= Politics of Mauritania =

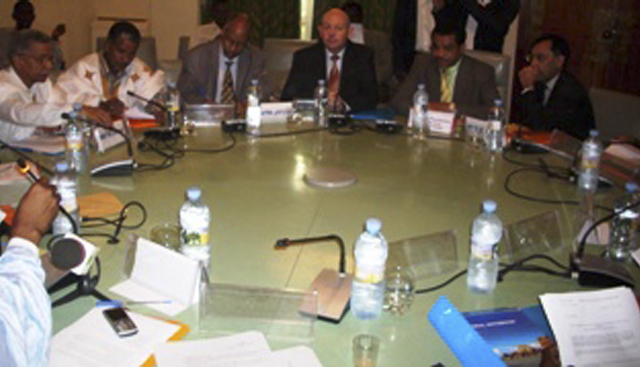
Mauritanian MPs meeting with World Bank officials in 2011.

Mauritania is a presidential democracy, but has suffered from repeated military coups since its Independence in November 1960. For 18 years after independence, Mauritania was a one-party state under Moktar Ould Daddah. This was followed by decades of military rule. The first fully democratic presidential election in Mauritania occurred on 11 March 2007, which marked a transfer from military to civilian rule following the military coup in 2005. The election was won by Sidi Ould Cheikh Abdallahi, who was ousted by another military coup in 2008 and replaced by general Mohamed Ould Abdel Aziz. Mauritania underwent its first peaceful transition of power after the 2019 presidential election, although this was between two presidents of the ruling UPR party and former army generals.

Personalities have long exercised an important influence in the politics of Mauritania – the effective exercise of political power in the country depends on control over resources; perceived ability or integrity; and tribal, ethnic, family, and personal considerations. Conflict between white Moor, black Moor, and non-Moor ethnic groups, centering on language, land tenure, and other issues, continues to pose challenges to the idea of national unity.

== Political administration ==
The government bureaucracy comprises traditional ministries, special agencies, and parastatal companies. The Ministry of Interior controls a system of regional governors and prefects modeled on the French system of local administration. Under this system, Mauritania has 13 regions (wilaya), including the capital district, Nouakchott.

Control remains tightly concentrated in the executive branch of the central government, but a series of national and municipal elections since 1992 have produced some limited decentralization.

== Political history ==
Mauritania achieved independence from the French colonial empire in 1960. After independence, President Moktar Ould Daddah, originally installed by the French, formalized Mauritania into a one-party state in 1964 with a new constitution, which set up an authoritarian presidential regime. Daddah's own Parti du Peuple Mauritanien (PPM) became the ruling organization. The President justified this decision on the grounds that he considered Mauritania unready for western-style multi-party democracy. Under this one-party constitution, Daddah was reelected in uncontested elections in 1966, 1971 and 1976. Daddah was ousted in a bloodless coup on July 10, 1978.

A committee of military officers governed Mauritania from July 1978 to April 1992. A popular referendum approved the current Constitution in July 1991.

=== Maaouya Ould Sid'Ahmed Taya's rule (1984–2005) ===
The Parti Républicain Démocratique et Social (PRDS), led by President Maaouya Ould Sid'Ahmed Taya, has dominated Mauritanian politics since the country's first multi-party elections in April 1992 following the approval by referendum of the current constitution in July 1991. President Taya, who won elections in 1992, 1997 and 2003, first became chief of state through a December 12, 1984, bloodless coup which made him Chairman of the committee of military officers that governed Mauritania from July 1978 to April 1992.

Political parties were legalized again in 1991. By April 1992, as civilian rule returned, 16 major political parties had been recognized; 12 major political parties were active in 2004. By April 1992, as civilian rule returned, 15 political parties had gained official recognition. Among the mostly small groupings, two main opposition parties emerged:

1. the Rally of Democratic Forces (RFD).
2. the Action for Change (AC)--traditionally considered the party of the Haratines.

Most opposition parties boycotted the first legislative election in 1992, and for nearly a decade the Democratic and Social Republican Party (PRDS) dominated the Parliament. The opposition participated in municipal elections in January–February 1994 and in subsequent elections for the Senate, gaining representation at the local level as well as one seat in the Senate. Noting procedural changes and opposition gains in municipal and legislative contests, most local observers considered the October 2001 elections open and transparent. The opposition participated in municipal elections in January–February 1994 and subsequent Senate elections, most recently in April 2004, gaining representation at the local level as well as three seats in the Senate.

In October 2001, Mauritania held its third legislative and fifth municipal elections since the establishment of multi-party politics under the 1991 Constitution. In an effort to forestall the sort of widespread accusations of fraud and manipulation which had accompanied previous elections, the government introduced new safeguards, including published voter lists and a hard-to-falsify voter identification card. Reversing a trend of election boycotts, 15 opposition parties nominated candidates for more than 3,000 municipal posts and for the 81-member National Assembly. Four opposition parties won a combined 11 seats in the National Assembly and took 15% of the municipal posts. The ruling Democratic and Social Republican Party (PRDS), in conjunction with two coalition parties, won the remaining contests. See 2003 Mauritania election

Mauritania's presidential election, its third since adopting the democratic process in 1992, took place on November 7, 2003. Six candidates, including Mauritania's first female and first Haratine (former slave family) candidates, represented a wide variety of political goals and backgrounds. Incumbent President Maaouya Ould Sid'Ahmed Taya won re-election with 67.02% of the popular vote, according to the Official figures, with ex-head-of-state Col. Mohamed Khouna Ould Haidalla finishing second.

Ould Sid'Ahmed Taya recognized the State of Israel, and started cooperating with the United States in antiterrorism activities.

A group identifying itself as the Military Council for Justice and Democracy (CMJD) overthrew the Taya Government on 3 August 2005 during the absence of the President in Saudi Arabia for King Fahd's funeral. The military dictatorship said it would remain in power for two years in order to allow time for implementing democratic institutions.

=== August 2005 military coup ===
In August 2005, a military coup led by Col. Ely Ould Mohamed Vall ended Maaouya Ould Sid'Ahmed Taya's 21 years of strong-arm rule.

On August 3, the Mauritanian military, including members of the presidential guard (BASEP), seized control of key points in the capital of Nouakchott. They took advantage of President Taya's attendance at the funeral of Saudi King Fahd to organize the coup, which took place without loss of life. The officers, calling themselves the Military Council for Justice and Democracy, released the following statement:

The national armed forces and security forces have unanimously decided to put a definitive end to the oppressive activities of the defunct authority, which our people have suffered from during the past years. (BBC)

The Military Council later issued another statement naming as president Col. Ould Mohamed Vall, Director of the national police force, the Sûreté Nationale, since 1987, and listing 16 other officers as members.

Col. Mohamed Vall was once regarded as a firm ally of the now-ousted president Sid'Ahmed Taya, even aiding him in the original coup that brought him to power, and later serving as his security chief. This high-level betrayal of the former president suggests broad discontent within the branches of local government, which is further supported by the lack of bloodshed and the population's support of the rebel militaries.

Applauded by the Mauritanian people, but cautiously watched by the international community, the coup has since been generally accepted, while the military junta has promised to organize elections within two years.

Parliamentary and municipal elections were held on the 19 November 2006 .

Israel's recognition by the Islamic Republic of Mauritania was maintained by the new regime.

=== Dispute with Woodside Petroleum ===
In February 2006, the new Mauritanian government denounced amendments to an oil contract made by former Leader Ould Taya with Woodside Petroleum, an Australian company. In 2004, Woodside had agreed to invest $US 600 million in developing Mauritania's Chinguetti offshore oil project. The controversial amendments, which Mauritanian authorities declared had been signed "outside the legal framework of normal practice, to the great detriment of our country", could cost Mauritania up to $200 million a year, according to BBC News. Signed by Woodside two weeks after the February 1, 2005, legislation authorizing the four amendments, they provided for a lower state quota in the profit-oil, and reduced taxes by 15 percent in certain zones. They also eased environmental constraints and extended the length and scope of the exploitation and exploration monopoly, among other measures.

The disputed amendments were signed by former Oil Minister Zeidane Ould Hmeida in February 2004 and March 2005. Hmeida was arrested in January 2006 on charges of "serious crimes against the country's essential economic interests".

Nouakchott's authorities declared that the government would likely seek international arbitration, which Woodside (which operated for Hardman, BG Group, Premier, ROC Oil, Fusion, Petronas, Dana Petroleum, Energy Africa and the Hydrocarbons Mauritanian Society) also contemplated.

Discovered in 2001, Chinguetti has proven reserves of about 120,000,000 barrels (19,000,000 m^{3}) of oil. At the end of December 2005, authorities estimated that in 2006, the oil profits would be 47 billion ouguiyas (about US$180 million) and represent a quarter of the state budget, according to RFI.

=== 2007 Presidential election ===
The first fully democratic Presidential election since 1960 occurred on 11 March 2007. The election is the final transfer from military to civilian rule following the military coup in 2005. This is the first time the president will have been selected by ballot in the country's history.

The election was won by Sidi Ould Cheikh Abdallahi.

Slavery is still said to exist in Mauritania, some 100 years after slavery officially ended in the West and since it was officially abolished in the country in 1981.

=== 2008 coup d'état ===
On August 6, 2008, Mauritania's presidential spokesman Abdoulaye Mamadou Ba said President Sidi Ould Cheikh Abdallahi, Prime Minister Yahya Ould Ahmed Waghef and the Interior minister, were arrested by renegade Senior Mauritanian army officers, unknown troops and a group of generals, and were held under house arrest at the Presidential palace in Nouakchott. In the apparently successful and bloodless coup d'état, Abdallahi's daughter Amal Mint Cheikh Abdallahi said, "The security agents of the BASEP (Presidential Security Battalion) came to our home and took away my father." The coup plotters are top fired Mauritania’s security forces, which include General Muhammad Ould ‘Abd Al-‘Aziz, General Muhammad Ould Al-Ghazwani, General Philippe Swikri, and Brigadier General (Aqid) Ahmed Ould Bakri. Mauritanian lawmaker, Mohammed Al Mukhtar, announced that "many of the country's people were supporting the takeover attempt and the government is 'an authoritarian regime'" and that the president had "marginalized the majority in parliament."

=== After the 2008 coup ===
In August 2019, former General Mohamed Ould Ghazouani was sworn in as Mauritania’s tenth president since its independence from France in 1960. His predecessor Mohamed Ould Abdel Aziz ran the African desert country for 10 years. The ruling party Union for the Republic (UPR) was founded by Aziz in 2009 and renamed to Equity Party in 2022. Mohamed Ould Ghazouani's victory in the 2019 Mauritanian presidential election was presented as having been the country's first peaceful transition of power since independence. In June 2024, President Ghazouani was re-elected for a second term.

== Executive branch ==
Main office-holders
| Office | Name | Party | Since |

== Legislative branch ==
The Parliament (Barlamane/Parlement) had two chambers. The National Assembly (Al Jamiya al-Wataniyah/Assemblée Nationale) has 176 members, elected for a five-year term in single-seat constituencies. The Senate (Majlis al-Shuyukh/Sénat) had 56 members, 53 members elected for a six-year term by municipal councillors with one third renewed every two years and 3. It was abolish in August 2017.

== Political parties and elections ==
=== Presidential elections ===
| Candidate | Party | Votes | % |
|---|---|---|---|
| Mohamed Ould Ghazouani | Union for the Republic | 483,007 | 52.00 |
| Biram Dah Abeid | Democratic Alternation Pole | 172,649 | 18.59 |
| Sidi Mohamed Ould Boubacar | Independent | 165,995 | 17.87 |
| Kane Hamidou Baba | Coalition Living Together | 80,777 | 8.70 |
| Mohamed Ould Maouloud | Union of the Forces of Progress | 22,656 | 2.44 |
| Mohamed Lemine El Mourteji El Wafi | Independent | 3,688 | 0.40 |
| Total | | 928,772 | 100.00 |
| Valid votes | | 928,772 | 96.04 |
| Invalid votes | | 28,796 | 2.98 |
| Blank votes | | 9,504 | 0.98 |
| Total votes | | 967,072 | 100.00 |
| Registered voters/turnout | | 1,544,132 | 62.63 |
Source: Constitutional Council

=== Tables ===
Results by wilaya
| Wilaya | Ghazouani | | Abeid | | Boubacar | | Baba | | Maouloud | | El Wavi | | Neutral | | Null | |
| Wilaya | Votes | % | Votes | % | Votes | % | Votes | % | Votes | % | Votes | % | Votes | % | Votes | % |
| Adrar | 16,743 | 68.88% | 1,514 | 6.23% | 5,009 | 20.61% | 226 | 0.93% | 751 | 3.09% | 63 | 0.26% | 178 | 0.71% | 668 | 2.66% |
| Assaba | 47,275 | 68.19% | 10,702 | 15.44% | 8,805 | 12.70% | 921 | 1.33% | 1,418 | 2.05% | 203 | 0.29% | 305 | 0.42% | 2,496 | 3.46% |
| Brakna | 46,038 | 50.64% | 10,643 | 11.71% | 15,947 | 17.54% | 16,836 | 18.52% | 1,291 | 1.42% | 160 | 0.18% | 1,350 | 1.42% | 2,753 | 2.90% |
| Dakhlet Nouadhibou | 14,248 | 30.04% | 15,587 | 32.86% | 10,713 | 22.59% | 5,534 | 11.67% | 1,075 | 2.27% | 273 | 0.58% | 491 | 1.00% | 1,010 | 2.06% |
| Gorgol | 23,594 | 35.95% | 21,429 | 32.65% | 3,451 | 5.26% | 15,196 | 23.16% | 1,795 | 2.74% | 158 | 0.24% | 937 | 1.36% | 2,435 | 3.53% |
| Guidimagha | 19,454 | 41.69% | 16,131 | 34.56% | 4,021 | 8.62% | 6,461 | 13.84% | 529 | 1.13% | 73 | 0.16% | 573 | 1.16% | 1,958 | 3.98% |
| Hodh Ech Chargui | 75,463 | 81.80% | 2,877 | 3.12% | 12,156 | 13.18% | 367 | 0.40% | 594 | 0.64% | 799 | 0.87% | 336 | 0.35% | 2,809 | 2.94% |
| Hodh El Gharbi | 52,350 | 75.07% | 3,421 | 4.91% | 11,647 | 16.70% | 625 | 0.90% | 1,430 | 2.05% | 266 | 0.38% | 243 | 0.34% | 1,849 | 2.57% |
| Inchiri | 5,659 | 60.67% | 753 | 8.07% | 2,244 | 24.06% | 472 | 5.06% | 180 | 1.93% | 19 | 0.20% | 94 | 0.98% | 193 | 2.01% |
| Nouakchott-Nord | 29,055 | 39.77% | 15,003 | 20.54% | 22,558 | 30.88% | 2,776 | 3.80% | 3,133 | 4.29% | 534 | 0.73% | 824 | 1.08% | 2,368 | 3.11% |
| Nouakchott-Ouest | 25,379 | 34.89% | 20,055 | 27.57% | 13,468 | 18.51% | 10,124 | 13.92% | 3,414 | 4.69% | 306 | 0.42% | 1,164 | 1.53% | 2,386 | 2,386 |
| Nouakchott-Sud | 30,889 | 31.39% | 30,621 | 31.12% | 18,742 | 19.05% | 15,054 | 15.30% | 2,667 | 2.71% | 433 | 0.44% | 1,472 | 1.43% | 3,203 | 3.11% |
| Tagant | 19,467 | 73.47% | 1,105 | 4.17% | 4,622 | 17.44% | 73 | 0.28% | 1,186 | 4.48% | 44 | 0.17% | 152 | 0.56% | 549 | 2.02% |
| Tiris Zemmour | 8,772 | 44.07% | 2,991 | 15.03% | 5,690 | 28.59% | 1,834 | 9.21% | 539 | 2.71% | 77 | 0.39% | 174 | 0.84% | 556 | 2.69% |
| Trarza | 65,068 | 57.77% | 17,150 | 15.23% | 25,021 | 22.22% | 2,808 | 2.49% | 2,369 | 2.10% | 211 | 0.19% | 1,119 | 0.96% | 3,352 | 2.86% |
| Diaspora | 3,553 | 35.73% | 2,667 | 26.82% | 1,901 | 19.12% | 1,470 | 14.78% | 285 | 2.87% | 69 | 0.69% | 92 | 0.90% | 211 | 2.06% |
| Total | 483,007 | 52.00% | 172,649 | 18.59% | 165,995 | 17.87% | 80,777 | 8.70% | 22,656 | 2.44% | 3,688 | 0.40% | 9,504 | 0.98% | 28,796 | 2.98% |
Source: Constitutional Council

Results by moughataa
| Moughataa | Ghazouani | | Abeid | | Boubacar | | Baba | | Maouloud | | El Wavi | | Neutral | | Null | |
| Moughataa | Votes | % | Votes | % | Votes | % | Votes | % | Votes | % | Votes | % | Votes | % | Votes | % |
| Aïoun | 12,673 | 71.01% | 897 | 5.03% | 3,779 | 21.17% | 40 | 0.22% | 379 | 2.12% | 80 | 0.45% | 52 | 0.28% | 451 | 2.46% |
| Akjoujt | 3,422 | 59.27% | 300 | 5.20% | 1,622 | 28.09% | 288 | 4.99% | 128 | 2.22% | 14 | 0.24% | 64 | 1.08% | 95 | 1.60% |
| Aleg | 20,143 | 64.45% | 2,324 | 7.44% | 8,027 | 25.68% | 286 | 0.92% | 427 | 1.37% | 49 | 0.16% | 137 | 0.42% | 935 | 2.89% |
| Amourj | | | | | | | | | | | | | | | | |
| Aoujeft | 4,413 | 77.75% | 81 | 1.43% | 797 | 14.04% | 19 | 0.33% | 355 | 6.25% | 11 | 0.19% | 24 | 0.42% | 73 | 1.26% |
| Arafat | 19,730 | 44.28% | 7,486 | 16.80% | 12,439 | 27.92% | 2,859 | 6.42% | 1,725 | 3.87% | 318 | 0.71% | 508 | 1.10% | 1,289 | 2.78% |
| Atar | 9,333 | 63.89% | 1,237 | 8.47% | 3,629 | 24.84% | 190 | 1.30% | 181 | 1.24% | 38 | 0.26% | 138 | 0.90% | 516 | 3.38% |
| Bababé | 3,487 | 36.52% | 1,121 | 11.74% | 483 | 5.06% | 4,378 | 45.85% | 63 | 0.66% | 16 | 0.17% | 328 | 3.24% | 263 | 2.59% |
| Barkéol | | | | | | | | | | | | | | | | |
| Bassiknou | | | | | | | | | | | | | | | | |
| Bénichab | 2,237 | 62.96% | 453 | 12.75% | 622 | 17.51% | 184 | 5.18% | 52 | 1.46% | 5 | 0.14% | 30 | 0.82% | 98 | 2.66% |
| Bir Moghrein | | | | | | | | | | | | | | | | |
| Boghé | 5,820 | 30.29% | 3,834 | 19.96% | 1,738 | 9.05% | 7,433 | 38.69% | 346 | 1.80% | 41 | 0.21% | 482 | 2.38% | 551 | 2.72% |
| Boumdeid | | | | | | | | | | | | | | | | |
| Boutilimit | | | | | | | | | | | | | | | | |
| Chami | 1,818 | 54.40% | 441 | 13.20% | 977 | 29.23% | 38 | 1.14% | 55 | 1.65% | 13 | 0.39% | 53 | 1.52% | 84 | 2.41% |
| Chinguetti | 1,611 | 67.13% | 167 | 6.96% | 386 | 16.08% | 16 | 0.67% | 207 | 8.63% | 13 | 0.54% | 9 | 0.36% | 63 | 2.55% |
| Dar Naïm | 8,927 | 37.59% | 6,327 | 26.64% | 6,145 | 25.87% | 1,455 | 6.13% | 835 | 3.52% | 61 | 0.26% | 303 | 1.21% | 900 | 3.61% |
| Djiguenni | | | | | | | | | | | | | | | | |
| El Mina | 5,985 | 20.37% | 13,193 | 44.90% | 3,142 | 10.69% | 6,619 | 22.52% | 391 | 1.33% | 56 | 0.19% | 543 | 1.75% | 1,047 | 3.38% |
| F'Déirick | | | | | | | | | | | | | | | | |
| Ghabou | | | | | | | | | | | | | | | | |
| Guerou | | | | | | | | | | | | | | | | |
| Kaédi | | | | | | | | | | | | | | | | |
| Kankoussa | | | | | | | | | | | | | | | | |
| Keur Macène | | | | | | | | | | | | | | | | |
| Kiffa | | | | | | | | | | | | | | | | |
| Koubenni | 12,456 | 67.02% | 1,470 | 7.91% | 3,646 | 19.62% | 300 | 1.61% | 630 | 3.39% | 84 | 0.45% | 84 | 0.44% | 614 | 3.18% |
| Ksar | 9,623 | 46.13% | 3,862 | 18.51% | 5,395 | 25.86% | 923 | 4.42% | 971 | 4.65% | 87 | 0.42% | 304 | 1.39% | 747 | 3.41% |
| M'Bagne | | | | | | | | | | | | | | | | |
| M'Bout | | | | | | | | | | | | | | | | |
| Maghama | | | | | | | | | | | | | | | | |
| Magta Lahjar | | | | | | | | | | | | | | | | |
| Méderdra | | | | | | | | | | | | | | | | |
| Monguel | | | | | | | | | | | | | | | | |
| Moudjéria | | | | | | | | | | | | | | | | |
| N'Beiket Lahwach | | | | | | | | | | | | | | | | |
| Néma | | | | | | | | | | | | | | | | |
| Nouadhibou | 12,430 | 28.19% | 15,146 | 34.35% | 9,736 | 22.08% | 5,496 | 12.47% | 1,020 | 2.31% | 260 | 0.59% | 438 | 0.96% | 926 | 2.04% |
| Ouad Naga | | | | | | | | | | | | | | | | |
| Ouadane | 1,386 | 85.45% | 29 | 1.79% | 197 | 12.15% | 1 | 0.06% | 8 | 0.49% | 1 | 0.06% | 7 | 0.43% | 16 | 0.97% |
| Oualata | | | | | | | | | | | | | | | | |
| Ould Yengé | | | | | | | | | | | | | | | | |
| R'Kiz | | | | | | | | | | | | | | | | |
| Riyad | 5,174 | 21.15% | 9,942 | 40.64% | 3,161 | 12.92% | 5,576 | 22.79% | 551 | 2.25% | 59 | 0.24% | 421 | 1.63% | 867 | 3.37% |
| Rosso | | | | | | | | | | | | | | | | |
| Sebkha | 2,720 | 13.04% | 9,795 | 46.97% | 983 | 4.71% | 7,018 | 33.65% | 304 | 1.46% | 35 | 0.17% | 386 | 1.75% | 780 | 3.54% |
| Sélibaby | | | | | | | | | | | | | | | | |
| Tamchekett | 9,449 | 83.90% | 399 | 3.54% | 1,297 | 11.52% | 25 | 0.22% | 74 | 0.66% | 18 | 0.16% | 23 | 0.20% | 188 | 1.64% |
| Tevragh Zeina | 13,036 | 42.01% | 6,398 | 20.62% | 7,090 | 22.85% | 2,183 | 7.04% | 2,139 | 6.89% | 184 | 0.59% | 474 | 1.46% | 859 | 2.65% |
| Teyarett | 8,493 | 40.08% | 3,808 | 17.97% | 6,659 | 31.43% | 985 | 4.65% | 1,099 | 5.19% | 144 | 0.68% | 266 | 1.21% | 596 | 2.70% |
| Tichitt | | | | | | | | | | | | | | | | |
| Tidjikja | | | | | | | | | | | | | | | | |
| Timbédra | | | | | | | | | | | | | | | | |
| Tintane | 17,772 | 80.62% | 655 | 2.97% | 2,925 | 13.27% | 260 | 1.18% | 347 | 1.57% | 84 | 0.38% | 84 | 0.37% | 596 | 2.62% |
| Toujounine | 11,635 | 41.37% | 4,868 | 17.31% | 9,754 | 34.69% | 336 | 1.19% | 1,199 | 4.26% | 329 | 1.17% | 255 | 0.87% | 872 | 2.98% |
| Zouérate | | | | | | | | | | | | | | | | |
| Africa | | | | | | | | | | | | | | | | |
| America | | | | | | | | | | | | | | | | |
| Asia | | | | | | | | | | | | | | | | |
| Europe | | | | | | | | | | | | | | | | |
| Total | 483,007 | 52.00% | 172,649 | 18.59% | 165,995 | 17.87% | 80,777 | 8.70% | 22,656 | 2.44% | 3,688 | 0.40% | 9,504 | 0.98% | 28,796 | 2.98% |
Source: Constitutional Council

== Administrative divisions ==
Mauritania is divided in 12 regions (regions, singular – region) and 1 capital district*; Adrar, Assaba, Brakna, Dakhlet Nouadhibou, Gorgol, Guidimaka, Hodh Ech Chargui, Hodh El Gharbi, Inchiri, Nouakchott*, Tagant, Tiris Zemmour, Trarza.

== International organization participation ==
ABEDA, ACCT (associate), ACP, AfDB, AFESD, AL, AMF, AMU, CAEU, CCC, ECA, ECOWAS, FAO, G-77, IBRD, ICAO, ICRM, IDA, IDB, IFAD, IFC, IFRCS, IHO (pending member), ILO, IMF, International Maritime Organization, Intelsat, Interpol, IOC, ITU, NAM, OAU, OIC, OPCW, UN, UNCTAD, UNESCO, UNIDO, UPU, WHO, WIPO, WMO, WToO, WTrO.
