= Government of Yahya Ould Ahmed El Waghef =

Government of Mauritania between May and August 2008

- Government of the Islamic Republic of Mauritania
- 2008
- Date formed: 11 May 2008
- Date dissolved: 6 August 2008

People and organisations
- President: Sidi Ould Cheikh Abdallahi
- Prime Minister: Yahya Ould Ahmed El Waghef
- Member parties: PNDD—ADIL; UFP; Tewassoul
- Status in legislature: Majority national unity coalition government
- Opposition parties: RFD
- Opposition leader: Ahmed Ould Daddah

History
- Election: 2006 Mauritanian parliamentary election
- Legislature term: 7th National Assembly of Mauritania
- Outgoing formation: 2008 Mauritanian coup d'état
- Predecessor: Ould Zeidane
- Successor: Ould Mohamed Laghdaf

The government of Yahya Ould Ahmed El Waghef was the government of the Islamic Republic of Mauritania, in office between 11 May and 6 August 2008.

The government was deposed by the 2008 Mauritanian coup d'état led by General Mohamed Ould Abdel Aziz.

== Ministers ==
The list of members was announced by the Presidency of the Republic on 11 May, taking position immediately.

Cabinet members
Portfolio	Minister	Took office	Left office
Prime Minister	Yahya Ould Ahmed El Waghef	6 August 2008	6 August 2008
Minister Secretary-General at the Republic	Bodjiel Ould Houmeid	6 August 2008	6 August 2008
Minister Counselor at the Presidency of the Republic	Bâ Boubakar Moussa	6 August 2008	6 August 2008
Minister of Justice	Yahya Ould Sid'El Moustaph	11 May 2008	6 August 2008
Minister of Foreign Affairs and Cooperation	Cheikh El Avia Ould Mohamed Khouna	11 May 2008	6 August 2008
Minister of National Defense	Mohamed Mahmoud Ould Mohamed Lemine	11 May 2008	6 August 2008
Minister of the Interior	Mohamed Yehdhih Ould Moctar El Hacen	11 May 2008	6 August 2008
Minister of Economy and Finance	Abderrahmane Ould Hamma Vezaz	11 May 2008	6 August 2008
Minister of Fundamental and Secondary Education and of the Fight Against Illiteracy	Nebghouha Mint Haba	11 May 2008	6 August 2008
Minister of Higher Education	Mohamed Mahmoud Ould Seydi	11 May 2008	6 August 2008
Minister of Islamic Affairs and Original Education	Dahane Ould Ahmed Mahmoud	11 May 2008	6 August 2008
Minister of Employment, Integration and Vocational Training	Habib Ould Hemdeit	11 May 2008	6 August 2008
Minister of Health	Mohamed Ould Mohamed El Hafedh Ould Khlil	11 May 2008	6 August 2008
Minister of Petroleum and Mines	Kane Mustapha	11 May 2008	6 August 2008
Minister of Fishing	Assane Soumaré	11 May 2008	6 August 2008
Minister of Trade and Industry	Salma Mint Tegueddi	11 May 2008	6 August 2008
Minister of Handicrafts and Tourism	Mohamed Mahmoud Ould Brahim Khlil	11 May 2008	6 August 2008
Minister of Decentralisation and Land Planning	Yahya Ould Kebd	11 May 2008	6 August 2008
Minister of Agriculture and Livestock	Corréra Issagha	11 May 2008	6 August 2008
Minister of Equipment, Urbanism and Housing	Mohamed Ould Bilal	11 May 2008	6 August 2008
Minister of Transports	Bebaha Ould Ahmed Youra	11 May 2008	6 August 2008
Minister of Water and Energy	Mohamed Ould R'zeizim	11 May 2008	6 August 2008
Minister of Culture and Communication	Mohamed Ould Amar	11 May 2008	6 August 2008
Minister of Public Service and Modernisation of Administration	Moustapha Ould Hamoud	11 May 2008	6 August 2008
Minister in charge of Relations with Parliament and Civil Society	Sidney Sokhona	11 May 2008	6 August 2008
Minister in charge of the Promotion of Women, Children and Families	Fatimetou Mint Khattri	11 May 2008	6 August 2008
Minister in charge of Youth and Sports	Mohamed Ould Berbesse	11 May 2008	6 August 2008
Minister Delegate
Minister in charge of the Environment (Note: The Minister is delegate to the Prime Minister.)	Dahmoud Ould Merzoug	11 May 2008	6 August 2008
Minister in charge of the Arab Maghreb (Note: The Minister is delegate to the Minister of Foreign Affairs and Cooperation.)	Mohamed Lemine Ould Nati	11 May 2008	6 August 2008
Secretaries
Secretary-General of Government	Bâ Abdoulaye Mamadou	11 May 2008	6 August 2008
Secretary of State at the Ministry of Economy and Finance in charge of the Budget	Sid'Ahmed Ould Rayes	11 May 2008	6 August 2008
Secretary of State in charge of Mauritanians abroad	Mohamed Ould Mohamedou	11 May 2008	6 August 2008
Secretary of State in charge of Information and Communication Technologies	Abdallahi Ould Ely Ould Benane	11 May 2008	6 August 2008

== Footnotes ==
Preceded by Ould Zeidane	Government of Mauritania; 2008	Succeeded by Ould Mohamed Laghdaf
