= 1996 Mauritanian parliamentary election =

- 11 October 1996 (first round); 18 October 1996 (second round)
- All 79 seats in the National Assembly; 40 seats needed for a majority
- Turnout: 52.06% (▲13.20pp)
Party	Leader	Seats	+/–
PRDS	Maaouya Ould Sid'Ahmed Taya	70	+3
AC	Messaoud Ould Boulkheir	1	New
RDU	Ahmed Ould Sidi Baba	1	0
Independents	–	7	−3
This lists parties that won seats. See the complete results below.
Prime Minister before	Prime Minister-designate
Cheikh El Avia Ould Mohamed Khouna; PRDS	Cheikh El Avia Ould Mohamed Khouna; PRDS

Parliamentary elections were held in Mauritania on 11 October 1996, with a second round in 16 of the 79 constituencies on 18 October. After the ruling Democratic and Social Republican Party (PRDS) won 60 of the 63 seats decided in the first round, the opposition Union of Democratic Forces boycotted the second round, resulting in the PRDS winning a total of 70 seats. Voter turnout was 52.1%, and only around 30% in Nouakchott.

== Results ==
Party	Votes	%	Seats	+/–
Democratic and Social Republican Party	352,482		70	3
Action for Change	26,295		1	New
Union of Democratic Forces-New Era	27,779		0	New
Union for Democracy and Progress	8,666		0	New
Rally for Democracy and Unity	7,392		1	0
Social and Democratic Popular Union	707		0	0
Party of Work and National Unity	360		0	0
Mauritanian Centre Democracy Party	159		0	0
Union for Democracy and Progress	109		0	New
Party for Democratic Cooperation	107		0	New
Independents	66,234		7	–3
Total			79	0
Total votes	541,859	–		
Registered voters/turnout	1,040,855	52.06		
Source: Nohlen et al.
