= 2007 Mauritanian Senate election =

Indirect Senatorial elections were held in Mauritania on 21 January 2007, with a second round on 4 February 2007. There are 56 seats in the Senate. The senators were elected by 3,688 municipal councilors, except for three (who represent the Mauritanian diaspora) who were chosen by the elected senators.

== Campaign ==
The period for the deposit of candidacies ran from 12 December to midnight on 21 December 2006. 187 candidate lists were filed, including 133 for independents and 54 for parties or coalitions. 170 lists were cleared to participate: 118 for independents, 37 for parties and 15 for coalitions.

The campaign for the election began at midnight on January 4 and continued through January 19.

== Results ==
38 members were elected in the first round; independents of the Al-Mithaq coalition won 23 seats, while the Republican Party for Democracy and Renewal (PRDS) which had been the ruling party during the presidency of Maaouya Ould Sid'Ahmed Taya, won 3 seats, and the opposition Coalition of Forces for Democratic Change (including the Rally of Democratic Forces) won 11 seats.

Of the 15 seats decided in the second round, eleven were won by Al-Mithaq independents and four by the CFCD. This resulted in the following totals:

The vote for one seat was cancelled due to irregularities and planned to be held again later. Participation among the councilors who voted in the election was placed at 97.94%. The three senators representing Mauritanians abroad were elected by the Senate on 9 June.

Party	First round			Second round			Total seats
Party	Votes	%	Seats	Votes	%	Seats	Total seats
Al-Mithaq	2,258	71.98	23	1,081	77.94	11	34
Rally of Democratic Forces and allies	365	11.64	5	98	7.07	1	6
Republican Party for Democracy and Renewal	231	7.36	3				3
Union of the Forces of Progress	129	4.11	1	29	2.09	0	1
Coalition of Forces for Democratic Change	83	2.65	3				3
Mauritanian Party of Union and Change and allies	31	0.99	1	103	7.43	2	3
Union for Democracy and Progress and allies	28	0.89	1				1
People's Progressive Alliance and allies	12	0.38	1				1
RFD–UFP				76	5.48	1	1
Representatives of the diaspora							3
Total	3,137	100.00	38	1,387	100.00	15	56

== Aftermath ==
Bâ Mamadou dit M'Baré, a senator from Maghama, was elected as President of the Senate on April 26, 2007. 40 Senators voted for Bâ Mamadou dit M'Baré, while 11 voted for Ahmed Salem Ould Bakar, a senator from Boutilimit.

The other seven members of the bureau of the Senate were elected later on the same day, with 41 votes in favor and 11 against. Néma Senator Hamma Ould Cheikh Saad Bouh was elected as First Vice-president, Rosso Senator Mohamed El Hacen Ould El Hadj was elected as Second Vice-president, and Tevragh Zeina Senator Rivaa Mint Ahmed Nalla was elected as Third Vice-president.
