= Ould Daddah =

Ould Daddah may refer to one of two Mauritanian political figures:

- Moktar Ould Daddah (1924–2003), President of the Islamic Republic of Mauritania from 1960 to 1978.
- Ahmed Ould Daddah (born 1942), half-brother of Moktar Ould Daddah, economist, politician, and civil servant.
