= Union of Progressive Forces =

Union of Progressive Forces can refer to:

- Union des forces progressistes (Canada)
- Union of the Forces of Progress
