= Coalition of Forces for Democratic Change =

Electoral coalition in Mauritania

Coalition of Forces for Democratic Change Coalition des Forces de Changements
- Founded: 28 June 2006
- Preceded by: Bloc of Eight

The Coalition of Forces for Democratic Change (CFDC) (French: Coalition des Forces de Changements Démocratique) was an electoral coalition in Mauritania. The Coalition was founded on 28 June 2006 by ten Mauritanian political parties, following Mauritania's "return to democracy" after the 2005 Mauritanian coup d'état. The main aims of the coalition were to prevent the elections of politicians who had served under former President Maaouya Ould Sid'Ahmed Taya, and also to cut Mauritania's diplomatic ties with Israel, with one of the Coalitions first actions being to organize a pro-Palestinian rally in Nouakchott.

Most of the parties were former members of the Bloc of Eight electoral coalition. The only two members of the Bloc of Eight who didn't want to join the CFDC were the Union for Democracy and Progress and Sawab, which didn't join for ideological reasons.

The coalition won in the 21 January and 4 February 2007 Senate elections only 3 out of 56 seats.

== Composition ==
The parties that made up the coalition were;

- People's Progressive Alliance (former Bloc of Eight)
- Popular Front (former Bloc of Eight)
- Union of the Forces of Progress (former Bloc of Eight)
- Democratic Renovation (former Bloc of Eight)
- Rally of Democratic Forces (former Bloc of Eight)
- Rally for Mauritania (former Bloc of Eight)
- Mauritanian Party of Union and Change (HATEM)
- Democratic Union Party (PUD)
- The Central Reformist Party (recognition status still pending).
- The Direct Democratic Movement (recognition status still pending).
