= High Council of State (Mauritania) =

The High Council of State (Arabic: المجلس الأعلى للدولة; French: Haut Conseil d’État) was the supreme political body of Mauritania. It served as the country's interim government following the coup d'état which ousted the President, Sidi Ould Cheikh Abdallahi on August 6, 2008. It was led by General Mohamed Ould Abdel Aziz. After seizing power, it quickly pledged to hold elections "in the shortest possible period". A few days after seizing power, Ould Abdel Aziz named Mauritanian Ambassador to Belgium and the European Union, Moulaye Ould Mohamed Laghdaf, as Prime Minister.

On April 15, 2009, Ould Abdel Aziz resigned as President of the High Council of State in order to stand as a candidate in the upcoming presidential election. President of the Senate, Ba Mamadou Mbaré, succeeded him as head of state in an interim capacity, becoming the first black leader of Mauritania. The election took place on July 18, 2009, and Ould Abdel Aziz was elected President with 52.58% of the votes. He was sworn in on August 5, 2009.

== Members ==
Portrait	Name	Elected	Term of office		Political party
	Mohamed Ould Abdel Aziz		2008	2009	Military Council for Justice and Democracy
	Mohamed Ould Ghazouani		2008	2009	Military Council for Justice and Democracy
	Ely Ould Mohamed Vall		2008	2009	Military Council for Justice and Democracy
	Abderrahmane Ould Boubacar		2008	2009	Military Council for Justice and Democracy
	Ahmed Ould Bekrine		2008	2009	Military Council for Justice and Democracy
	Sogho Alassane		2008	2009	Military Council for Justice and Democracy
	Ghoulam Ould Mohamed		2008	2009	Military Council for Justice and Democracy
	Sidi Mohamed Ould Cheikh El Alem		2008	2009	Military Council for Justice and Democracy
	Negri Felix		2008	2009	Military Council for Justice and Democracy
	Mohamed Ould Meguett		2008	2009	Military Council for Justice and Democracy
	Mohamed Ould Mohamed Znagui		2008	2009	Military Council for Justice and Democracy
	Kane Hamedine		2008	2009	Military Council for Justice and Democracy
	Mohamed Ould Abdi		2008	2009	Military Council for Justice and Democracy
	Ahmed Ould Ameine		2008	2009	Military Council for Justice and Democracy
	Ahmedou Bemba Ould Baye		2008	2009	High Council of State
	Taleb Moustapha Ould Cheikh		2008	2009	Military Council for Justice and Democracy
	Mohamed Cheikh Ould Mohamed Lemine		2008	2009	Military Council for Justice and Democracy
	Dia Adama Oumar		2008	2009	High Council of State
	Hanena Ould Sidi		2008	2009	High Council of State
	Mohamed Ould Cheikh Ould El Hadi		2008	2009	High Council of State
	Isselkou Ould Cheikh El Wely.		2008	2009	Military Council for Justice and Democracy.

== See also ==
- Military Committee for National Recovery (CRMN) – Military government in 1978–79.
- Military Committee for National Salvation (CMSN) – Military government in 1979–92.
- Military Council for Justice and Democracy (CMJD) – Military government in 2005–07.
