= 1992 Mauritanian presidential election =

- 24 January 1992
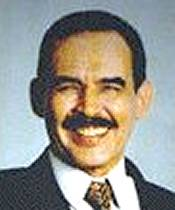

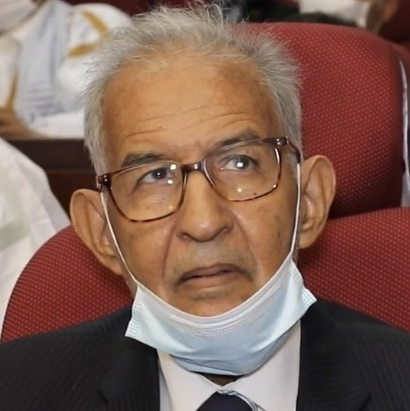
Nominee	Maaouya Ould Sid'Ahmed Taya	Ahmed Ould Daddah
Party	PRDS	UFD-EN
Popular vote	345,583	180,658
Percentage	62.89%	32.88%
- Results by wilaya
President before election
Maaouya Ould Sid'Ahmed Taya
PRDS
Elected President
Maaouya Ould Sid'Ahmed Taya
PRDS

Presidential elections were held in Mauritania on 24 January 1992. They followed the constitutional referendum the previous year that resulted in the reintroduction of multi-party democracy, and were the first presidential elections to feature more than one candidate. The result was a victory for incumbent President Maaouya Ould Sid'Ahmed Taya of the Democratic and Social Republican Party, who defeated three other candidates with 62.9% of the vote. Voter turnout was just 47.4%.

== Results ==
Candidate	Party	Votes	%
Maaouya Ould Sid'Ahmed Taya	Democratic and Social Republican Party	345,583	62.89
Ahmed Ould Daddah	Union of Democratic Forces	180,658	32.88
Mustafa Ould Salek	Independent	15,735	2.86
Mohamed Mahmoud Ould Mah	Popular Social and Democratic Union	7,506	1.37
Total		549,482	100.00
Valid votes		549,482	97.98
Invalid/blank votes		11,314	2.02
Total votes		560,796	100.00
Registered voters/turnout		1,183,892	47.37
Source: Nohlen et al.

=== By wilaya ===
Wilaya	Taya		Daddah		Salek		Mah	
Wilaya	Votes	%	Votes	%	Votes	%	Votes	%
Adrar	17,182	85.0	1,787	8.8	1,003	5.0	228	1.1
Assaba	31,304	73.2	9,014	21.1	1,948	4.6	516	1.2
Brakna	30,248	61.4	17,443	35.4	1,001	2.0	556	1.1
Dakhlet Nouadhibou	17,092	49.7	15,356	44.7	1,320	3.8	606	1.8
Gorgol	16,179	48.0	16,888	50.0	360	1.0	348	1.0
Guidimaka	12,713	46.9	13,608	50.2	441	1.6	321	1.2
Hodh Ech Chargui	52,440	85.6	5,285	8.6	2,771	4.5	795	1.3
Hodh El Gharbi	54,342	84.4	7,507	11.7	1,903	3.0	618	1.0
Inchiri	2,926	72.7	823	20.4	168	4.2	109	2.7
Nouakchott	53,479	47.1	55,203	48.6	2,923	2.6	2,046	1.8
Tagant	18,089	81.7	3,407	15.4	425	1.9	233	1.1
Tiris Zemmour	7,506	64.2	3,598	30.8	460	3.9	127	1.1
Trarza	32,083	49.5	30,739	47.4	1,012	1.6	1,003	1.5
Source: Nohlen et al.
