= Union of the Forces of Progress =

Union of the Forces of Progress اتحاد قوى التقدم Union des forces du progrès
- President: Mohamed Ould Maouloud
- Founded: 1991 (Note: (as the UFD/B faction of UFD-EN)); 2001 (as a political party)
- Split from: Union of Democratic Forces-New Era
- Headquarters: Nouakchott, Mauritania
- Ideology: Left-wing nationalism Civic nationalism Multiracialism; Democratic socialism Social democracy Historical: Marxism; Maoism
- Political position: Centre-left to left-wing
- Slogan: Unity, Democracy, Social Justice (Note: Arabic: وحدة، ديمقراطية، عدالة إجتماعية; Pulaar: Dental, demokaraasi, pottal; Wolof: Benno, demokaraasi, yemale askanwi; Soninke: Merigemme, demokaraasi, kiite; French: Unité, démocratie, justice sociale)
- National Assembly: 0 / 176
- Regional councils: 5 / 285
- Mayors: 0 / 238

Election symbol

The Union of the Forces of Progress (Arabic: اتحاد قوى التقدم, romanized: Ittihad quwa al-taqaddum; French: Union des forces du progrès, UFP) is a centre-left to left-wing political party in Mauritania.

== Position ==
The UFP describes itself as a cross ethnic, republican, social justice oriented party. It has made statements against the persecution of black skinned Mauritanians, the continuation of slavery and unfair labor practices, and for guarantees of safety and resources for those refugees from the 1989 interethnic conflict who remain in Senegal. The UFP has also strongly condemned the involvement of the Mauritanian Army in politics, specifically the 2005 and 2008 coups. They have called upon Mauritanian political leaders to negotiate a political consensus which would define the "rules of the game" for Mauritanian politics, which they view as divisive, ethnically charged, and corrupt.

== History ==
The party has its roots in the Kadihine (Arabic: "toiler", "worker") movement of the Mauritanian 1960s and 1970s, with its organization, the Parti Kadihine Mauritanien (PKM) working as a clandestine socialist and anti-colonial oppositional group against the single-party rule of Mokhtar Ould Daddah and the Mauritanian People's Party (PPM). The party was composed mostly of Moorish Arab Mauritanians, although it was opposed to the prevailing racial and ethno-social discrimination, and subsumed an important faction of Black African opposition politicians inside its organization. After 1969, the party mended its relations with Ould Daddah after he took several steps to the left, nationalizing the mining industry, Sociéte Anonyme des Mines de Fer de Mauritanie (MIFIRMA, today's SNIM), in Zouérat, loosening his strong ties with the former colonial power France, and took other measures to strengthen Mauritania's international anticolonial profile. The PKM then divided between a group which agreed to join Ould Daddah's ruling party, the PPM, as a leftist intra-party opposition; and another group which was more reluctant to cooperate with the authorities, and reorganized in new opposition movements, primarily the Mouvement Nationale Démocratique (MND). When Mauritania invaded Western Sahara in 1975 to establish a Greater Mauritania, in collaboration with Morocco, the Kadihines again took a strong stance against the regime, and in favor of Sahrawi self-determination and the Polisario Front (with which the UFP retains strong relations even today). After the 1978 coup d'état, the movement lost much influence, as politics moved over into the military sphere.

The modern UFP began as a faction of the Union of Democratic Forces-New Era (UFD). At an extraordinary party congress called by this faction in August 1998 it elected MND leader Mohamed Ould Maouloud as its president, and this caused a split in the party. The opposing faction, led by Ahmed Ould Daddah, was dubbed the UFD/A, while Maouloud's faction was dubbed the UFD/B. The latter faction participated in the January 1999 local election, which was boycotted by the former. In late 2000, the UFD/A was dissolved by the government, and the UFD/B changed its own name in solidarity, now calling itself the Union of the Forces of Progress.

In the parliamentary election held on 19 and 26 October 2001, the party won 3 out of 81 seats.

In the November–December 2006 parliamentary election, the UFP participated in the Coalition of the Forces of Democratic Change. The UFP won eight seats (three in the first round and five in the second round), as well as two other seats together with the Rally of Democratic Forces. On January 2, 2007, the party held a congress and designated its president, Maouloud, as its candidate for the March 2007 presidential election. In the election, Maouloud took seventh place in the first round with 4.08% of the vote. Maouloud then backed Daddah in the second round. In the 21 January and 4 February 2007 Senate elections it joined the Rally of Democratic Forces and won 1 seat.

On May 10, 2008, Maouloud announced the party's decision to participate in the government of Prime Minister Yahya Ould Ahmed El Waghef; the party was accordingly one of two opposition parties to be included in Waghef's government, the composition of which was announced on May 11. This government only survived until July 2008, however.

Following the August 2008 coup, the UFP joined a four-party coalition, the National Front for the Defence of Democracy, which opposed the coup and demanded the restoration of President Sidi Ould Cheikh Abdallahi.

== Electoral performance ==
=== National Assembly ===
National Assembly
Election	Party leader	National list		Seats	+/–	Government
Election	Party leader	Votes	%	Seats	+/–	Government
2001	Mohamed Ould Maouloud	—		3 / 81	▲3	Opposition
2006	Mohamed Ould Maouloud	—		9 / 95	▲6	Opposition (2006–2008)
2006	Mohamed Ould Maouloud	—		9 / 95	▲6	Government (May–August 2008)
2013	Mohamed Ould Maouloud	Boycotted		0 / 146	▼9	Opposition
2018	Mohamed Ould Maouloud	19,664	2.80%	3 / 157	▲3	Opposition
2023	Mohamed Ould Maouloud	17,387	1.79%	0 / 176	▼3	Opposition
