= 2008 Mauritanian coup d'état =

Military overthrow of President Abdallahi

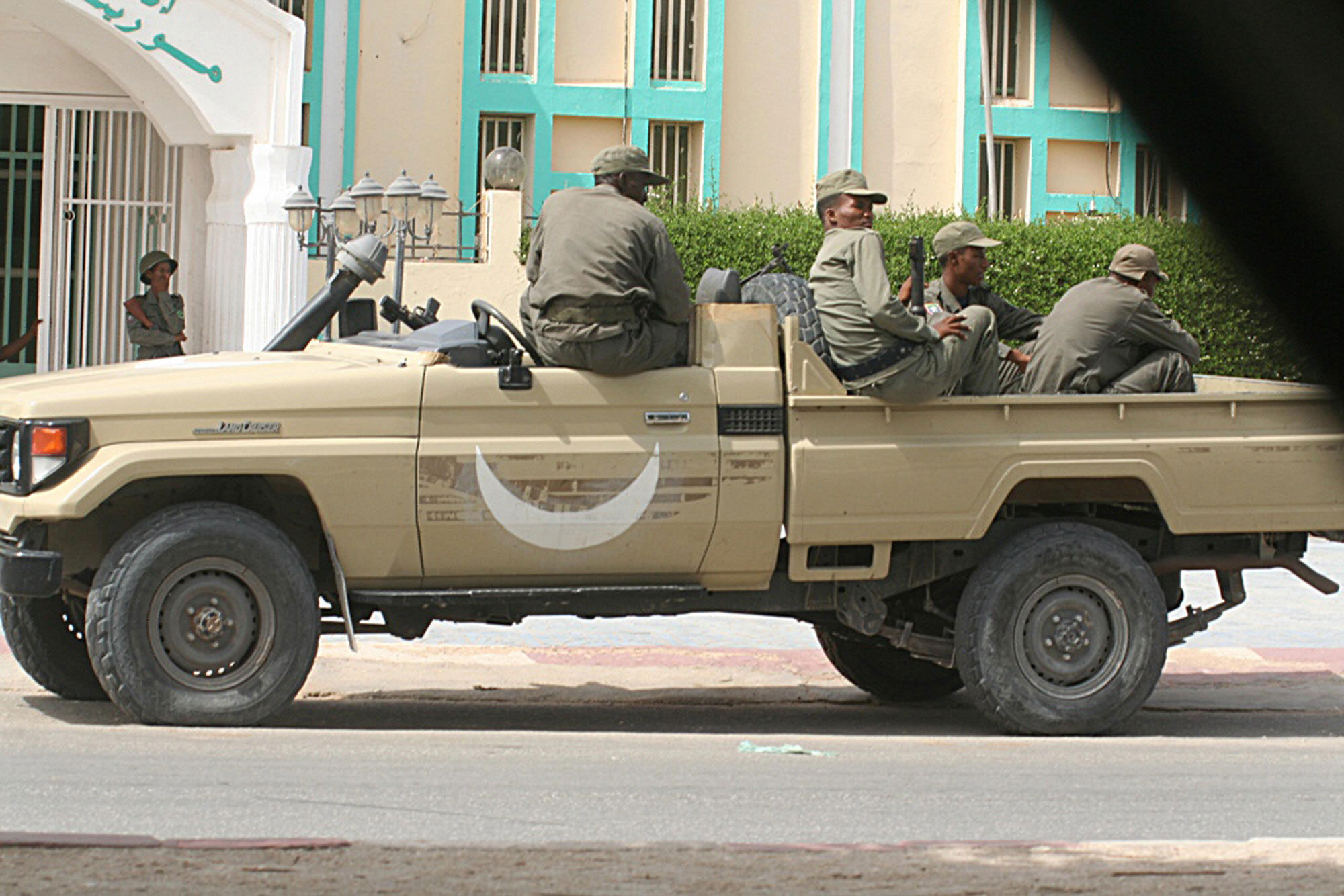
- Mauritanian soldiers on a Toyota Land Cruiser pickup truck in Nouakchott on August 7, following the coup.
- Date: 6 August 2008; 18 years ago
- Location: Nouakchott, Mauritania
- Type: Military coup
- Motive: Regime change
- Target: Presidential Palace, Nouakchott
- Organised by: Mohamed Ould Abdel Aziz
- Participants: Faction within the Armed Forces
- Outcome: Coup succeeds: Overthrow of democratically elected government of President Abdallahi.; The establishment of military rule under the High Council of State headed by General Aziz.; Election of General Aziz as President in 2009.

The 2008 Mauritanian coup d'état was a military coup that took place in Mauritania on August 6, 2008, when President Sidi Ould Cheikh Abdallahi was ousted from power by the Armed Forces of Mauritania, led by a group of high-ranking generals he had dismissed from office earlier that day.

== Background ==
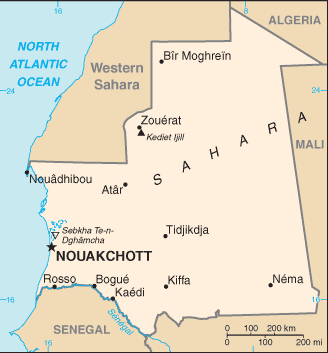
A CIA WFB map of Mauritania

General Mohamed Ould Abdel Aziz was one of the leading figures in the August 2005 coup that ended Maaouya Ould Sid'Ahmed Taya's 21 years in power.

Aziz backed Abdallahi's candidacy in the subsequent March 2007 presidential election, which Abdallahi won. Abdallahi soon angered General Aziz and his supporters, however, by reaching out to Islamic hardliners, by freeing several suspected terrorists, and by using state funds to build a mosque on the grounds of the presidential palace.

In May 2008, Abdallahi appointed 12 ministers who had been part of President Taya's former government, some of whom had been accused of corruption. This, together with the inclusion of members of opposition parties in the government (headed by Prime Minister Yahya Ould Ahmed El Waghef) and the government's failure to present a programme, led many members of the pro-Abdallahi National Pact for Democracy and Development (PNDD-ADIL) party in the National Assembly to file a censure motion against the government on June 30, 2008. The government resigned on July 2 before a no-confidence vote was held, and Abdallahi immediately reappointed Waghef to form a new government. The government that was announced on July 15 included no members of the opposition; it also excluded the former associates of Taya whose presence in the previous government had attracted criticism.

On August 4, 2008, 25 of the 49 PNDD-ADIL deputies in the National Assembly, along with 24 of the party's 45 senators, announced that they were leaving the party, thereby depriving it of its parliamentary majority.

The immediate catalyst for the coup was Abdallahi's official announcement on the morning of August 6 that he was firing several generals, including Aziz (who had been the head of the Presidential Guard) and Army chief of staff General Mohamed Ould Cheikh Mohamed.

Mauritania has experienced more than 10 coups or attempted coups since achieving its independence from France in 1960.

== Details of the coup ==
2008 Mauritanian coup d'état
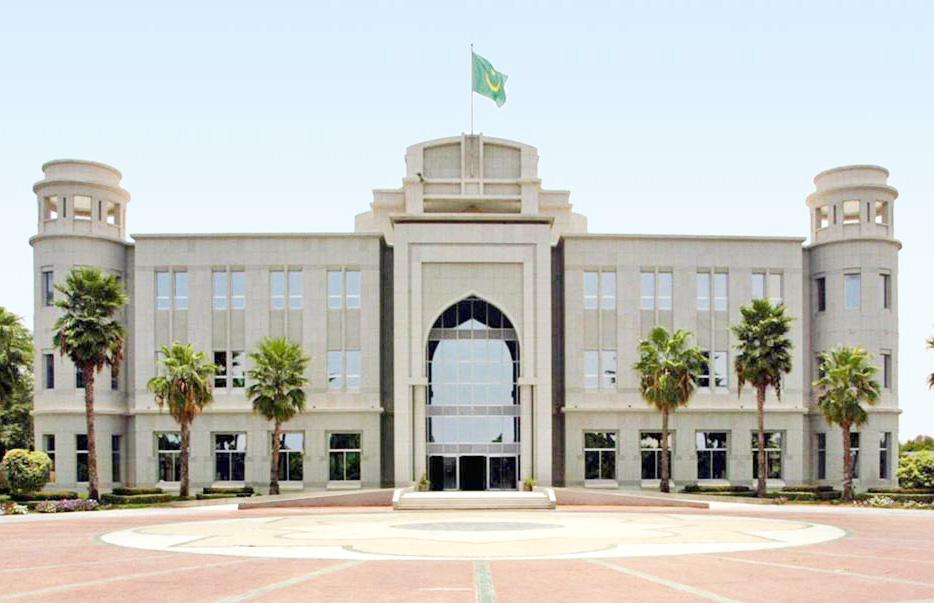
Date	August 2008
Location	Presidential Palace, Nouakchott, Mauritania
Result	Coup successful: Mohamed Ould Abdel Aziz becomes president of military junta (High Council of State)

Belligerents
(Mauritania) Mauritanian military	(Mauritania) Mauritanian government

Commanders and leaders
(Mauritania) Mohamed Ould Abdel Aziz (Mauritania) Mohamed Ould Ghazouani	(Mauritania) Sidi Ould Cheikh Abdallahi

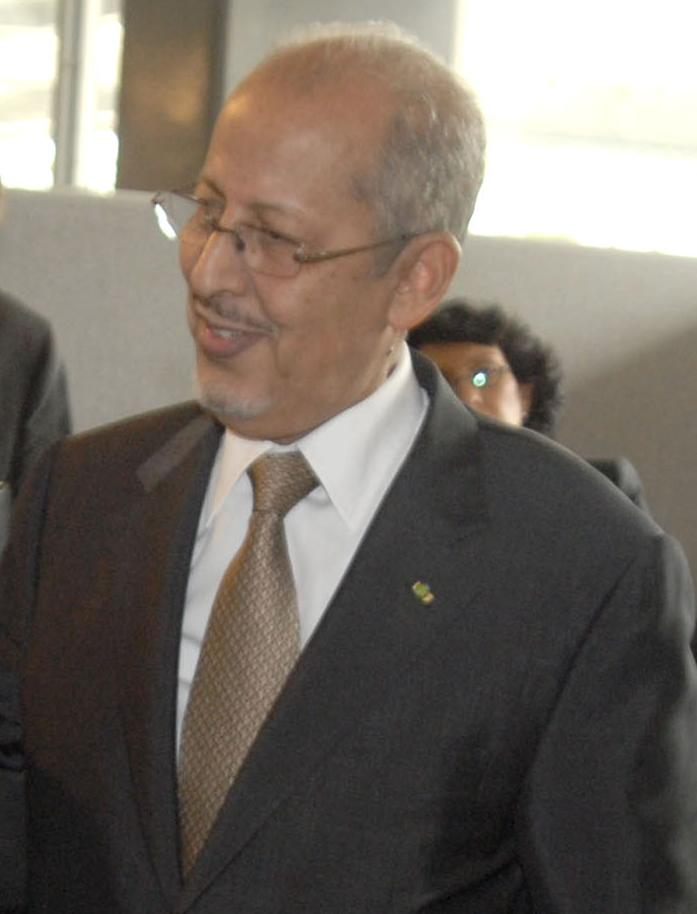
President Abdallahi

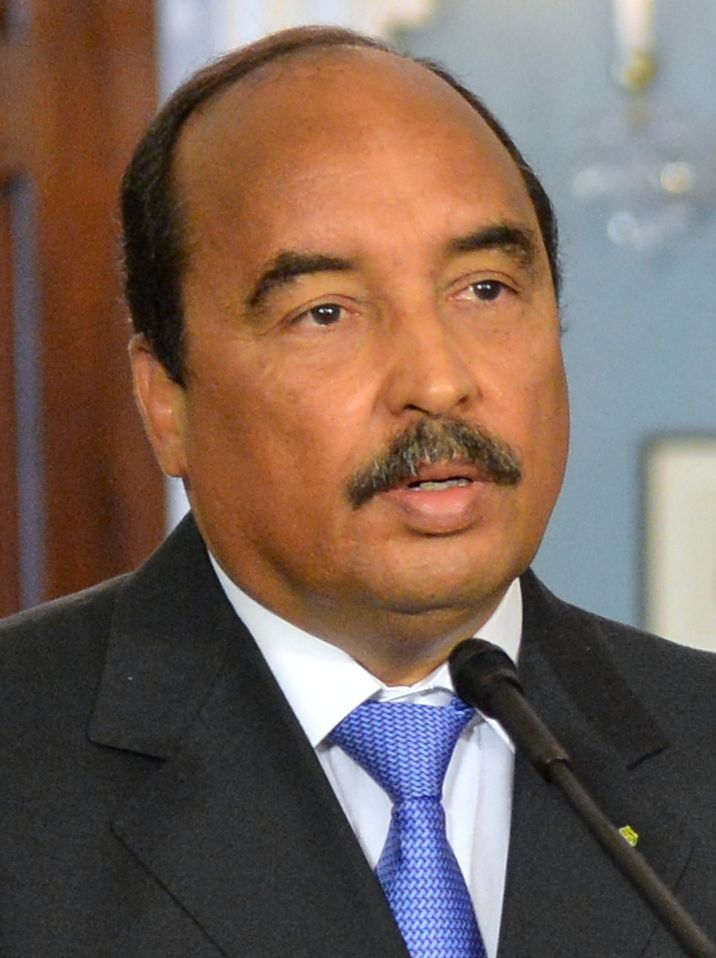
General Aziz

Early in the morning of August 6, Abdallahi announced that he was firing several senior army officers, and at 9:20 a.m. he was seized and captured from his home by members of the Presidential Security Battalion (BASEP for Bataillon de la sécurité présidentielle) in a military coup.

Presidential spokesman Abdoulaye Mamadou Ba said in a statement that President Abdallahi, Prime Minister Waghef, and Interior Minister Mohamed Ould R'zeizim had been arrested by renegade senior army officers, unknown troops, and a group of generals, and were being held under house arrest at the Presidential Palace in Nouakchott. Of the apparently successful and bloodless coup d'état, Abdallahi's daughter, Amal Mint Cheikh Abdallahi said: "The security agents of the BASEP came to our home and took away my father."

The coup plotters were recently fired senior officers in the security forces, including General Abdel Aziz, General Muhammad Ould Al-Ghazwani, General Philippe Swikri, and Brigadier-General (Aqid) Ahmed Ould Bakri. State television reported that the country was now being led by a new military State Council, which would be run by Abdel Aziz. The State Council said that Abdallahi was now the "former president."

General Mohamed Ould Abdel Aziz issued a statement on the al-Arabiya international television station and issued what he called, "communiqué No. 1" which reversed the "former president's" firing of the military officers. Al-Aziz was also reportedly holding talks with the president of the Mauritanian National Assembly, Messaoud Ould Boulkheir, on the feasibility of holding potential new elections in two months.

Police reportedly fired tear gas at about 50 people who had gathered near the main market of Nouakchott. Otherwise, the city remained calm.

All state television and radio stations in Nouakchott reportedly ceased broadcasting as the coup began. The Nouakchott International Airport was also closed.

== Aftermath of the coup ==
=== August ===
According to an official statement released on August 7, Abdallahi's powers were terminated, and Mauritania would be governed on a transitional basis by an 11-member High Council of State, with Abdel Aziz as the President of the council, until a new presidential election was held "in the shortest possible period". The Council promised that this election would be "free and transparent" and that it would consult with the national institutions, the political class, and civil society. Furthermore, the Council gave an assurance that it would "respect all treaties, international agreements and conventions to which Mauritania has subscribed". The members of the council were listed as:

- General Mohamed Ould Abdel Aziz (President of the Council)
- General Mohamed Ould Cheikh Mohamed Ahmed
- General Felix Négri
- Colonel Ahmed Ould Bekrine
- Colonel Mohamed Ould Cheikh Ould El Hadi
- Colonel Ghoulam Ould Mahmoud
- Colonel Mohamed Ould Meguett
- Colonel Mohamed Ould Mohamed Znagui
- Colonel Dia Adama Oumar
- Colonel Hanena Ould Sidi
- Colonel Ahmedou Bemba Ould Baye.

A demonstration in support of the coup was held in Nouakchott on August 7. About 1,000 people participated in this demonstration, chanting Abdel Aziz's name and marching towards the presidential palace, accompanied by vehicles carrying large portraits of Abdel Aziz. At the presidential palace, Abdel Aziz spoke to the demonstrators, saying that he would "work to solve all the problems this country is confronted with".

A protest against the coup was also held later on the same day in Nouakchott. According to PNDD-ADIL Secretary-General Mohamed Mahmoud Ould Dahmane, this was a peaceful protest in which 200 to 300 people participated, carrying portraits of Abdallahi, and was broken up by police with tear gas. Dahmane also called for Abdallahi's release, saying that he was the legitimate president, and said that the PNDD-ADIL had formed an alliance with three other parties in opposition to the coup: the Popular Progressive Alliance (APP), the Union of the Forces of Progress (UFP), and an Islamic party.

The High Council of State released a second statement on August 7, saying that the junta wanted to preserve the Constitution and democratic institutions, interfering with the functioning of those institutions as little as possible. According to this statement, the council would collectively exercise the powers of the presidency and a government would be appointed. The council also said that political parties and legal organizations would be allowed to operate freely, that freedoms, including the freedom of the press, would be respected, and that municipal councils could continue to function normally. Abdel Aziz also gave these assurances regarding freedoms and the continuity of democratic institutions, such as Parliament, in a meeting with Arab League Assistant Secretary-General Ahmed bin Heli.

The four-party alliance opposing the coup, called the National Front for the Defense of Democracy, held a press conference on August 8, and this developed into a protest rally against the coup in the Tevragh-Zeina section of Nouakchott, with several hundred people participating. This rally included calls for the soldiers to return to their barracks and for the international community to pressure the junta. APP spokesman Alkhalil Ould Teyib vowed that they would continue their struggle until Abdallahi was restored to the presidency. The National Front for the Defense of Democracy also announced plans for more demonstrations and activities opposing the coup, while also stating that they would only hold protests with the junta's permission.

Also on August 8, Abdallahi's daughter, Amal Mint Cheikh Abdallahi, said that she had not been informed of Abdallahi's whereabouts, and she expressed concern for Abdallahi's "health and safety". Meanwhile, Abdel Aziz said in an interview with Jeune Afrique that the military had been forced to take power by serious economic and political problems. He accused Abdallahi of attempting a "coup against democracy" through his actions; according to Abdel Aziz, Abdallahi had set members of parliament against one another and his dismissal of the senior officers immediately prior to the coup was intended to "divide the army". Abdel Aziz also said that Abdallahi was being held at the Palace of the Congress, was "in good conditions", had not complained, and would be released in a matter of days or weeks. According to Abdel Aziz, Abdallahi would probably not be required to leave Mauritania and would probably still be allowed to participate in politics. However, Abdel Aziz was quoted in an interview with Asharq al-Awsat published on August 9 as saying Abdallahi would not be released for "the time being", citing "security reasons"; he said that the junta was trying to establish an atmosphere of calm.

In an interview with Agence France-Presse on August 10, Abdel Aziz said that the coup was necessary to prevent "a catastrophe"; he said that Abdallahi had "acted irrationally", and in another interview with Al Jazeera he said that he had warned Abdallahi immediately prior to the coup that his decision to dismiss the senior officers could have serious consequences. According to Abdel Aziz, Abdallahi did not heed the warning, and as a result Abdel Aziz ordered the coup.

Abdel Aziz also criticized Abdallahi for releasing Islamic extremists from prison and allowing the Islamist Tewassoul party to join Waghef's government in May; he asserted that this was "irresponsible" and did not reflect Mauritania's identity as a "moderate Muslim country". Furthermore, he expressed his view that the international community would change its negative attitude toward the coup "when it has all the information".

Also on August 10, Abdel Aziz did not exclude the possibility that he or other members of the junta could run for president, although he said that the issue had not been decided and that other things needed to be dealt with first. His acknowledgement of the possibility was in contrast to the decision of the previous junta in 2005 to exclude its members from running for office.

Messoud Ould Boulkheir, the President of the National Assembly, said on August 10 that he still recognized Abdallahi as president and rejected the idea of a new election held under the junta. However, 67 of the 95 deputies in the National Assembly released a statement supporting the coup and describing it as "the logical and indisputable result of President Sidi Ould Cheikh Abdallahi's behavior to stall the republic's institutions". Meanwhile, Abdallahi's daughter said that the military had been involving itself in politics for two and a half months, and the PNDD-ADIL announced on August 10 that the junta had allowed it to reopen its offices.

Waghef and three other high-ranking officials (including the Interior Minister) were released by the military on August 11, while Abdallahi remained in custody. A few hours later, Waghef spoke before a rally of thousands of people and expressed defiance toward the junta, saying that Mauritanians did not accept its rule and urging the people to continue struggling to restore Abdallahi to power. He said that Abdallahi thanked them for their "untiring fight [...] to restore constitutional order".

Arab League Assistant Secretary-General Ahmed bin Heli said on August 11, after returning from Mauritania, that he had asked to meet with Abdallahi but was not allowed to do so. In a statement on August 12, the High Council of State outlined its powers, confirming that it would have "the necessary powers to reorganize and manage state affairs during the period needed for the organizing of presidential elections ... in the shortest possible time." It also confirmed that the council would collectively exercise presidential powers and that the council's president would be able to appoint a Prime Minister.

The Rally of Democratic Forces (RFD), which was the main opposition party under Abdallahi, supported the coup; its leader, Ahmed Ould Daddah (who was defeated by Abdallahi in the 2007 presidential election), told Al Jazeera on August 12 that the coup was "a movement to rectify the democratic process". Abdel Aziz met with political parties to discuss the formation of a new government. The APP said that it would not participate in this government, but the RFD said that it intended to "study the offer". 106 of the 151 members of both houses of Parliament (67 out of 95 deputies and 39 out of 56 senators) said in a statement on August 13 that they supported the coup. According to this statement, the coup occurred "in the context of an acute political and institutional crisis" and Abdallahi "only listened to sycophants". The statement also urged international support. Aside from the members of Parliament, 191 out of 216 mayors also supported the coup.

Abdel Aziz appointed Moulaye Ould Mohamed Laghdaf, a former ambassador, as Prime Minister on August 14, 2008. Laghdaf was already closely associated with Abdel Aziz, and some suggested that he might have been appointed in hopes that doing so would help international relations due to Laghdaf's diplomatic service in the European Union. Waghef said at a news conference on the same day that this appointment was "illegal" and that the government he had headed was still the legitimate government.

It was reported on August 15, that 71 out of 95 deputies were in favor of holding an extraordinary session of Parliament on August 20, with the intention of appointing members to a special court; this could in turn lead to a trial of Abdallahi and some of the ministers who had served under him for alleged mishandling of state affairs. On August 16, a group of 19 members of Parliament—three senators and 16 deputies—announced that it was seeking the restoration of Abdallahi to the presidency. According to Mohamed Moustapha Ould Bedredine, a deputy who spoke on the group's behalf, the group had more support than their numbers suggested.

Abdel Aziz made his first broadcast to the nation on August 17. He affirmed that a new presidential election would be held "as soon as possible", but he did not give a specific date. In this speech, Abdel Aziz promised to fight hard against terrorism and corruption; he also accused Abdallahi of failing to act against corruption and said that Abdallahi had handled the economy very poorly. On the same day, 26 members of Parliament who supported the coup announced their resignations from the PNDD-ADIL party.

On August 18, two-thirds of Mauritanian political parties—including major parties such as the RFD, the Republican Party for Democracy and Renewal (PRDR), and the Union for Democracy and Progress—grouped together to support the coup. According to PRDR leader Sidi Mohamed Ould Mohamed Vall, this was "dictated by the necessity to preserve the stability of the country and its democratic institutions", and he described the coup as "vital for Mauritania and for the maintenance of its democracy and its pluralism". Also on August 18, a pro-coup gathering, in which an estimated 25,000 people participated, was held in Nouakchott.

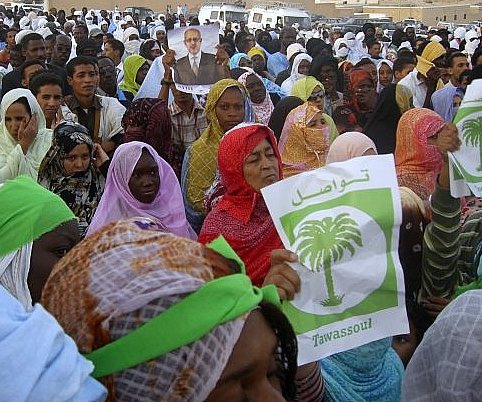
FNDD demonstration in Nouadhibou August 20.

RFD leader Daddah said on August 19 that there was "a good chance" that his party would participate in the government headed by Laghdaf. On August 20, a large anti-coup protest was held in Nouakchott by the National Front for the Defense of Democracy. The special session of Parliament, intended to consider "the reasons for the blockage of democratic institutions" prior to the coup and to appoint the members of a special court, also opened on August 20. 32 members of Parliament boycotted the special session, which was planned to last one month.

Waghef, the now former Prime Minister, said in an interview with Abu Dhabi TV on August 20 that President Abdallahi had dismissed the senior officers on August 6 because they had already been planning to seize power on August 9. He subsequently travelled to Nouadhibou in northern Mauritania in order to participate in an anti-coup protest there, but was arrested upon arrival on August 21. He was reportedly arrested because he left Nouakchott without the junta's permission. On August 22, it was announced that Waghef was being taken to his home village of Achram, where he would be kept under house arrest. According to Minister of Decentralization Yahya Ould Kebd, the junta sought to "rein in his activism", saying that "his contact with the outside will probably be limited but not banned".

The special session of Parliament included the creation of a Senate inquiry commission intended to investigate the finances of KB charitable foundation, which was headed by Abdallahi's wife, Khattou Mint Boukhary; Boukhary was a controversial figure who had been criticized by the opposition prior to the coup. On August 24, the foundation's lawyers urged the creation of an international commission to investigate its finances, arguing that the Senate commission would not be fair. The lawyers said that the Senate commission's "subjective results will always be contested".

Jean Ping, the Chairman of the Commission of the African Union, met with Abdel Aziz in Nouakchott on August 25. Ping said that he was in Mauritania to discuss restoring a constitutional government, not to discuss the junta's transition, and he expressed optimism after meeting Abdel Aziz. The talks between Abdel Aziz and Ping continued on August 26. A letter from El Khadim Ould Esseman, the imprisoned leader of Al-Qaeda in the Islamic Maghreb, was publicized on August 25. In this letter, he denounced the junta as an "infidel regime", urging all Mauritanians to "turn to the strict application of Sharia".

On August 26, the RFD, the Alliance for Justice and Democracy - Movement for Renovation (AJD-MR), and the Movement for Direct Democracy (MDD) announced their decision to not participate in the new government that was being formed under the junta because the junta had not clarified whether or not someone serving in the military would be allowed to stand as a presidential candidate and had not specified how long it intended to remain in power.

The new government led by Laghdaf was appointed on August 31 and announced on television early on September 1. This government was composed of 28 members, aside from Laghdaf, and its members were considered to be politically obscure technocrats. The government included several members of the RFD, despite that party's refusal to participate; the RFD responded by saying that the RFD members who had accepted posts in the government had "automatically resigned" from the party by doing so.

Former Head of State Mohamed Khouna Ould Haidalla expressed his support for the coup on August 29 and criticized the negative reactions of Western governments to the coup, alleging that they were interfering in Mauritanian affairs. In a statement on August 30, the African Union Commission said that Abdel Aziz had committed to releasing Abdallahi during his talks with Ping.

=== September ===
On September 2, the National Assembly chose four deputies to sit on a High Court that would try Abdallahi on allegations such as corruption and obstruction of Parliament. This vote was conducted by secret ballot, and a single list of candidates was approved, with 31 votes in favor, none opposed, and one abstention. After a meeting on September 4, Ping, Said Djinnit (the Special Representative of the UN Secretary-General for West Africa), and Ahmed Benhelli of the Arab League released a statement reiterating Abdel Aziz's commitment to release Abdallahi, as well as calling for resolution of the situation, restoration of democratic institutions, and Waghef's release.

Laghdaf announced on September 6 that an "open and constructive debate" would be held, in which members of parliament, political parties, and other organizations would be invited to participate. The purpose of this debate, according to Laghdaf, was to determine a timetable for holding a new election and consider various matters related to that election, including proposals for constitutional amendments and improved delineation of executive and legislative powers.

On September 10, the Senate chose four senators to serve on the High Court along with the four deputies that were elected eight days earlier.

On September 14, deputies present in the National Assembly unanimously approved a resolution that called for a presidential election to be held in 12 to 14 months. The length of the period was deemed necessary "to reestablish normal constitutional order and legitimacy". The resolution also called for an independent electoral commission and for the exclusion of candidacies by military officers and those who "exercised executive responsibilities susceptible of influencing voters". The possibility was nevertheless suggested that Abdel Aziz could retire from the army and stand in the election as a civilian.

In an ambush carried out by al-Qaida in the Islamic Maghreb on September 14, 11 soldiers and a civilian were captured; a week later, their decapitated bodies were found. The brutality of this attack was considered shocking in Mauritania. Although it was observed that it could be considered a humiliation for the military, it was also suggested that the threat of Islamist terrorism might help to bring the junta out of isolation. Supportive statements from France and the European Union, referring to the struggle against terrorism, followed the attack, although they were not specifically supportive of the junta (France referred simply to "the nation and the army").

On September 23, the African Union Peace and Security Council released a statement demanding Abdallahi's "unconditional restoration" by October 6. According to the statement, "the perpetrators of the coup and their civilian supporters" would face "sanctions and isolation" if the demand was not met. The members of Parliament supportive of the coup announced on September 26 that they rejected the African Union's demand "because it simply ignores the reality in the country where two-thirds of the parliament, almost all of the elected mayors and the majority of people support the changes of August 6". Abdel Aziz, in a statement on September 27, also rejected the African Union demand. Ping said on September 29 that he was surprised by the junta's reaction to the ultimatum and that he had expected the junta to react by seeking talks with the African Union.

Speaking on Al Jazeera on September 28, former Abdallahi spokesman Abdoulaye Mamadou Ba called for popular protests to be held on October 5 as part of "a day of democracy". Sidi Mohamed Ould Maham, a deputy, was elected as President of the High Court on September 28.

In an interview with Reuters on September 29, Laghdaf said that the government would seek aid from Arab countries and institutions if aid from the West was cut off. He also asserted that, following the coup, "freedoms are preserved, parliament has never been so free." Speaking to Radio France Internationale on September 30, Laghdaf said that all demonstrations, whether they opposed the junta or supported it, would be banned, emphasizing that "what we need now is calm".

=== October ===
Although the government banned protests, the National Front for the Defense of Democracy went ahead with its planned protest in Nouakchott on October 5. The protest began with a small group numbering a few dozen; the police asked the group to disperse, but it grew larger, with participants chanting anti-junta slogans and carrying pictures of Abdallahi. The police then responded with tear gas, breaking up the protest. Subsequently, the protesters attempted smaller gatherings at various places in Nouakchott, and the police worked to disperse these as well. According to UFP president Mohamed Ould Mouloud, the "protests constitute a scathing denial of the junta's pretense that the situation in Mauritania is calm, that everybody accepts the coup and that people here have freedom of expression and live in a democracy".

State media ignored the protests, as it also ignored the passing of the AU's October 6 deadline. A spokesman for the pro-junta parliamentary majority said that the AU ultimatum "doesn't scare anybody". Mouloud, acting as spokesman for the National Front for the Defense of Democracy, called for "the immediate implementation of sanctions against the junta". Ping said that the junta sent a delegation on October 6 to hold talks with the AU.

The eight-member Mauritanian delegation, led by Justice Minister Tidjane Bal, met with Jean Ping in Addis Ababa on October 7. Following the meeting, the AU released a statement saying that Ping "reiterate[d] the African Union's standpoint" and that the AU Peace and Security Council would propose a way of handling the situation. On the same day, another protest in Nouakchott was held. Immediately prior to the protest, six unions said that "instead of a peaceful march we will seek a confrontation". The police used tear gas against the protesters, and protesters threw rocks at the police.

Mouloud said on October 8 that the AU should react to the rejection of its ultimatum by "declar[ing] the military leadership illegal". The Mauritanian Information Agency (AMI) reported on the same day that the AU appeared to be taking a less hostile position since its deadline passed. Meanwhile, Boulkheir, the President of the National Assembly and the APP, called for a solution to the situation that would involve Abdallahi returning to the presidency for only the limited period necessary to organize an early presidential election. Boulkheir's proposal would also involve the formation of a government of national unity during that period.

On October 20, the EU held talks with the junta in Paris. Seeking Abdallahi's "immediate and unconditional release" and the restoration of constitutional rule, the European Union said in an October 20 statement that it was giving the junta a period of one month, after which "consultations will be terminated and appropriate measures will be proposed". Speaking for the National Front for the Defense of Democracy, Maouloud expressed satisfaction with the EU's ultimatum and remarked that "the junta has not managed to deceive the European Union".

=== November–December ===
The first regular session of Parliament since the coup began on November 10; the main purpose of this session was to pass the budget for 2009. About 30 deputies who opposed the coup, including Boulkheir, the President of the National Assembly, boycotted the session. Elarbi Ould Jedeine, the Vice-president of the National Assembly, presided over the session, while expressing regret regarding Boulkheir's boycott. Senators opposing the coup participated in the session. Ousted President Abdallahi was taken from Nouakchott to his home village of Lemden on November 13. According to the government, Abdallahi agreed to leave politics, but Abdallahi held a news conference on November 13 in which he said that he "did not make any promises with them". He also said that being moved to Lemden was meaningless because he "remain[ed] a president under house arrest".

Upon the expiration of the EU's one-month deadline on November 20, the EU announced that, because "the junta's proposals have been deemed insufficient by the international community, EU member states will examine, based on the proposals of the European Commission, appropriate measures". It viewed Abdallahi's transfer to Lemden was a positive step, but said that it was inadequate because Abdallahi remained under house arrest. Mauritanian Minister of Communication Mohammed Ould Moine said that the situation was "a purely Mauritanian matter" which "won't be solved in Washington, Paris or Addis Ababa", and he stressed that "no-one, and I mean no-one, has the right to make decisions for my country". Also on November 20, Abdallahi said in an interview that "once the coup is thwarted" he would "be open to all dialogue to discuss the future of the democratic institutions of the country in the framework of the constitution and the laws of the country".

After it was reported on December 12 that the junta planned to release Abdallahi from house arrest by December 24, the FNDD said on December 14 that anything less than Abdallahi's restoration to the presidency was insufficient. In an interview published on December 20, Abdallahi said that he would not take part in the national consultation meeting planned for December 27, despite being invited by the junta, as he felt his participation would "legitimize the coup d'etat". Abdallahi was taken out of Lemden by security forces in the early hours of December 21, driven to Nouakchott, and then released on the same day.

The national consultative meeting began on December 27. Abdel Aziz said that this would be an entirely free and open process. The meeting was planned to consider an election date, constitutional amendments, and the role of the army. Diplomats from 70 countries were present. Abdallahi and the FNDD boycotted the meeting, although FNDD President Boijel Ould Houmeid said on December 26 that his coalition had received no invitation.

=== 2009 ===
At the conclusion of the national consultative meeting on January 5, 2009, it proposed holding an election on May 30, 2009, with a second round (if necessary) on June 13. The FNDD derided the proposal as a "non-event" and alleged that the junta intended for the election to be won by "one of its members or a puppet [...] who will do their bidding." The official media announced on January 23 that the new presidential election would be held on June 6, 2009.

On February 4, 2009, while still expressing support for the coup and saying that Abdallahi should not be restored to the Presidency, Daddah proposed that the army give up power and that anyone who was serving in the military at the time of the coup should not be allowed to participate in the 2009 presidential election. He expressed concern that continued military rule would negatively affect Mauritania's relations with the rest of the world, potentially including economic sanctions.

The AU imposed sanctions on the junta in early February, restricting the travel of junta members and freezing any possible bank assets. Abdel Aziz dismissed the sanctions as meaningless on February 10, saying that no one on the High Council of State had a bank account outside of Mauritania.

On March 6, 2009, the government decided to sever diplomatic relations with Israel to protest the 2008–2009 Gaza War.

Libyan Leader and AU Chairman Muammar Gaddafi attempted to mediate the situation during a visit to Mauritania that concluded on March 12. During this visit he met with Abdallahi, who argued that Gaddafi was biased in favor of the junta. At the end of his visit, Gaddafi said that he thought the AU's sanctions should be lifted. In Niamey on March 14, Gaddafi said that Abdallahi could not return to power because the military would not allow it, and therefore Abdallahi had no choice but to "accept a fait accompli".

== International reaction ==
=== International organizations ===
- Arab League – The Arab League expressed concerns regarding the situation in Mauritania, called for the return of stability, and sent the Vice Secretary General of the Arab League to Mauritania.
- – The Arab Maghreb Union asked its own Secretary General Habib Ben Yahia to visit Mauritania immediately in order to assess the situation and "contact the various parties" involved in the coup.
- African Union – In a written statement the group immediately condemned the coup: "The African Union ... condemns the coup d'État and demands the restoration of constitutional legality." The African Union's Peace and Security Commissioner, Ramtane Lamamra, will soon travel to Nouakchott to assess the situation and to determine the best way to return democracy to the country. On August 9, Tanzanian Foreign Minister Bernard Membe, the Chairman of the AU Council of Ministers, said that the AU would suspend Mauritania's membership "until the country returns to constitutional government".
- European Union – The European Union has demanded the restoration of the former government in Mauritania. The European Commission said in a statement that it "is very concerned by the situation in Mauritania, which puts into question the remarkable democratic progress in this country". Commissioner for Development and Humanitarian Aid Louis Michel also said that "this situation could put into question our policy of cooperation with Mauritania," and could threaten the 156 million Euro of aid allocated for Mauritania for 2008–2013.
- (Organisation of Islamic Cooperation) OIC – The Secretary General of the Organization of the Islamic Conference Ekmeleddin Ihsanoglu has expressed his concern over the military take over staged against the democratically elected government in Mauritania today and detention of President and Prime Minister by the army officers. The Secretary General stated that he was particularly dismayed by this development as Mauritania had been exhibiting exemplary development towards the entrenchment of democracy and rule of law in the country with the visible positive role and support of its armed forces. Therefore, he said, he would have wished that all matters related to the conduct of political process in the country to be handled within the democratic principles and supremacy of law. He reminded that all Mauritanians and international community, as well as the OIC, had invested heavily in the democracy project in Mauritania and hoped that the armed forces would continue their positive role in favour of democracy. He called for the restoration of democratic process as soon as possible including an immediate release of the President, Prime Minister and other members of the government.
- United Nations – The United Nations Security Council held an official meeting at the headquarters in New York on August 19 to hear a statement from the Mauritanian ambassador that the event was a "corrective change" against a president who was not looking after the economy and security of the country. The Council then officially issued a condemnation of the Mauritanian military's overthrow of the democratically elected Government. Through a spokeswoman, United Nations Secretary General Ban Ki-moon stated that he "deeply regrets" the coup. Also, Ban's spokeswoman said he "deeply regrets the overthrow of the Government of President Sidi Ould Cheikh Abdallahi," and called for "the restoration of constitutional order".
- World Bank – The World Bank announced on August 21 that it had suspended 175 million dollars in aid.

=== States ===
- Canada – Foreign Affairs Canada released a statement saying, "Canada demands a return to the constitutional order embodied in the elected president, Sidi Ould Cheikh Abdallahi, and calls for the immediate release of all political figures held by the armed forces, including the President and the Prime Minister."
- Chile – The Ministry of Foreign Affairs released a press statement, noting that "the overthrowing -by the military- of the first democratic president elected in the entire history of Mauritania, constitutes a setback to the cause of democracy in the world. Chile longs for the restoration, as soon as possible in Mauritania, of the state of law, the legitimate, constitutional and democratically elected government, and the reestablishment of political and civil freedoms".
- France – When asked a question about the coup at a press conference, French minister of foreign affairs Bernard Kouchner replied, "You know how attached we are to Mauritania's stability. It is too soon to describe the situation. Let me remind you nevertheless of France's attachment to preserving the rule of law in all circumstances and its hostility to the seizure of power by force." A statement in French from the French Ministry of Foreign Affairs earlier in the day also said, "We are in contact with our embassy in Nouakchott and monitoring the situation with the greatest attention in conjunction with all our partners. Steps are being taken locally to ensure the safety of French nationals. The safety recommendations will be distributed according to the changing situation." France subsequently suspended its development assistance. On August 28, seeking Abdallahi's release and restoration to power, it announced that it was prepared to apply sanctions against individual junta leaders.
- Israel – Mauritania is the only other Arab League country besides Egypt and Jordan with which Israel has full diplomatic ties. Israel's former ambassador to Mauritania, Boaz Bismuth, had departed from his position a week before the coup. His successor, Miki Arbel, decided to delay his departure to the country. Yigal Palmor, the former director of the Maghreb department at the foreign ministry and the incoming spokesman, said Israel was "following very closely the developments, and waiting for things to clear up."
- Morocco – The government press is calling Abdel Aziz a patriot and an advisor of the king Mohammed VI of Morocco is going to Nouakchott to meet with Abdel Aziz.
- Nigeria – President Umaru Yar'Adua stated "Nigeria totally condemns the event that took place today in Mauritania. Nigeria will not recognize any government that did not come to power through constitutional means." He also said, "Our sub-region has made great advances in terms of peace and security and sustenance of democracy at great cost to our peoples that we cannot afford the hand of the clock to be turned back again."
- Russia – The Foreign ministry of Russia said, "Moscow acts on the assumption that a change of power by force is unacceptable. As is known, this is also the position of the international community, including the African Union. Such anti-constitutional actions deserve condemnation." The ministry further said that Russia hoped the country's new leadership, which has pledged to hold democratic presidential elections, would honor its pledge and give the Mauritanian people "an opportunity to continue stable development within the bounds of the Constitution and in the interest of all sections of Mauritanian society."
- Senegal – President Abdoulaye Wade urged the coup leaders to ensure the personal safety of President Abdallahi, Prime Minister Waghef and their families. A spokesperson for President Wade said that coup leader Gen. Mohamed Ould Abdel Aziz had telephoned him at 2:40pm local time to inform him of the situation "in his capacity as a close neighbor and African leader." Wade stated that he would inform the African Union about what he discussed with Aziz during the phone call.
- South Africa – A spokesperson for the department of foreign affairs said, "South Africa has never countenanced the use of military coups to settle political issues and joins the entire international community in expressing its outright and unequivocal condemnation of such unconstitutional transfer of power," adding, "South Africa like the rest of humanity calls for an immediate return to democracy and the rule of law."
- Spain – In a press release from The Directorate-General for Communication of the Ministry of Foreign Affairs and Foreign Office of the Kingdom of Spain, the following was stated, "The Spanish government expresses its condemnation of the coup that took place this morning in the Islamic Republic of Mauritania ... [we] also hoped to produce the immediate release of the President and the Prime Minister and the restoration of democratic normalcy."
- United Kingdom – Foreign Office minister Dr. Kim Howells said, "The UK is following the situation in Mauritania closely and is concerned by reports of a military coup. We condemn any attempt to seize power by force, and call on all parties to ensure respect for democracy, human rights and the rule of law, and to safeguard the wellbeing of their own citizens and foreign nationals in Mauritania. Britons currently in Mauritania should monitor local press reports and take sensible precautions for their safety."
- United States – US State Department spokesman Gonzalo Gallegos said of the coup, "We condemn, in the strongest possible terms, the Mauritanian military's overthrow of the democratically elected government of Mauritania." Secretary of State Condoleezza Rice said in a press conference, "The United States condemns the Mauritanian military's overthrow of the democratically elected Government of Mauritania and welcomes the statements by the African Union and the European Union condemning the coup. We call on the military to release President Sidi Mohamed Ould Cheikh Abdallahi and Prime Minister Yahya Ould Ahmed Waghef and to restore the legitimate, constitutional, democratically elected government immediately. The United States looks to all of our international partners to condemn this anti-democratic action." Russell Brooks of the State Department's Bureau of African Affairs said, "Our policy is that this action could have a very serious impact on our aid and cooperation with Mauritania." In compliance with a 2006 act of Congress, the U.S. cut all non-humanitarian aid to the country, totaling about $100 million. Food and other humanitarian aid, totaling about $5 million, was not affected. After the junta formed a government a few weeks later, the US announced on September 2 that it did not recognize this "so-called government" and still recognized Abdallahi and the previous government led by Prime Minister Waghef as the legitimate authorities. It also said that it was considering the imposition of financial and travel sanctions on individuals who took part "in an illegal and non-democratic government".

== See also ==
- 2005 Mauritanian coup d'état
- History of Mauritania (1991–present)
