= Kane Hamidou Baba =

Mauritanian politician (1954–2021)

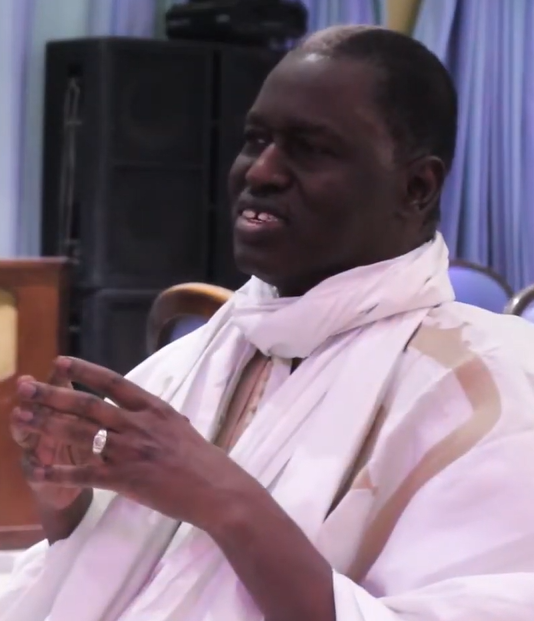

Deputy of the National Assembly of Mauritania
- In office 2006–2013

Personal details
- Born: 10 April 1954 Tékane, French Mauritania, French West Africa, France
- Died: 28 December 2021 (aged 67) Las Palmas, Spain
- Party: Union of Democratic Forces

Kane Hamidou Baba (Arabic: كان حاميدو بابا; 10 April 1954 – 28 December 2021) was a Mauritanian politician. A member of the Union of Democratic Forces, he served in the National Assembly from 2006 to 2013.

He died in a traffic collision in Las Palmas, Spain, on 28 December 2021, at the age of 67.
