= 1997 Mauritanian presidential election =

- 12 December 1997
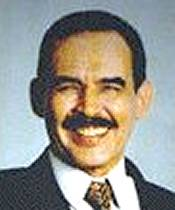

Nominee	Maaouya Ould Sid'Ahmed Taya	Chbih Ould Cheikh Malainine
Party	PRDS	Independent
Popular vote	801,190	61,869
Percentage	90.25%	6.97%
- Results by wilaya
President before election
Maaouya Ould Sid'Ahmed Taya
PRDS
Elected President
Maaouya Ould Sid'Ahmed Taya
PRDS

Presidential elections were held in Mauritania on 12 December 1997. Incumbent President Maaouya Ould Sid'Ahmed Taya won the election with 90% of the vote. Voter turnout was 75%.

== Background ==
President Ould Taya came to power in a coup d'état in 1984 and ruled Mauritania as one-party state for the next seven years. Under the 1991 constitution multi-party democracy was introduced with Taya being elected with 62% of the vote in the 1992 presidential election.

However the opposition alleged that the 1992 election had been fraudulent and the main opposition groups in Mauritania boycotted the 1997 election as they said it would not be a fair contest with, for instance, the electoral commission not being independent.

== Candidates ==
The campaign began on 27 November with President Ould Taya the clear favourite. Ould Taya focused on the performance of the economy and reinforcing democracy during his campaign. Ould Taya was backed by the Mouvance Presidentielle, which included the Rally for Democracy and Unity (RDU) and a faction of the Union of Democratic Forces.

Four candidates challenged Ould Taya including, Kane Amadou Moctar, the first black African to run for president in a country that had been dominated politically by Moors since independence. Moctar was a former hospital administrator who pledged to oppose slavery and establish a new policy of fisheries. Chbih Ould Cheikh Malainine was a former cabinet minister who had quit the RDU to form his own party and campaigned to eliminate slavery.

Moulaye El Hacen Ould Jeid was the secretary general of the Mauritanian Party for Renewal and Concord and in his campaign called for press censorship to be ended. Lastly Mohammed Mahmoud Ould Mah was the secretary general of the Popular Social and Democratic Union. He had contested the 1992 election and pledged to renegotiate agreements with the European Union and International Monetary Fund if he was elected.

== Results ==
President Ould Taya won the elections with official figures showing a turnout of around 74%, however the opposition claimed that their boycott had been successful and did not accept the official results. Voter turnout in the capital Nouakchott and the second city Nouadhibou was low but turnout was reported by the government to be higher elsewhere in the country. Ould Taya won just over 90% of the vote, with the former minister Chbih Ould Cheikh Malainine coming second with 7%.

Candidate	Party	Votes	%
Maaouya Ould Sid'Ahmed Taya	Democratic and Social Republican Party	801,190	90.25
Chbih Ould Cheikh Malainine	Independent	61,869	6.97
Moulaye El Hacen Ould Jeid	Mauritanian Party for Renewal and Concord	8,165	0.92
Mohammed Mahmoud Ould Mah	Popular Social and Democratic Union	6,443	0.73
Kane Amadou Moctar	Party for Liberty, Equality and Justice	3,342	0.38
Blank votes		6,753	0.76
Total		887,762	100.00
Valid votes		887,762	98.62
Invalid votes		12,438	1.38
Total votes		900,200	100.00
Registered voters/turnout		1,203,357	74.81
Source: African Elections Database

=== By wilaya ===
Wilaya	Sid'Ahmed Taya		Cheikh Malainine		Jeid		Mah		Moctar	
Wilaya	Votes	%	Votes	%	Votes	%	Votes	%	Votes	%
Adrar	21,579	84.7	2,980	11.7	612	2.4	200	0.8	93	0.4
Assaba	97,947	95.0	3,836	3.7	544	0.5	605	0.6	183	0.2
Brakna	58,802	93.4	3,064	4.9	335	0.5	559	0.9	223	0.4
Dakhlet Nouadhibou	12,996	54.3	10,155	42.4	406	1.7	229	1.0	164	0.7
Gorgol	39,872	91.7	2,558	5.9	269	0.6	452	1.0	323	0.7
Guidimaka	30,675	92.1	1,667	5.0	283	0.8	397	1.2	276	0.8
Hodh Ech Chargui	191,708	98.7	1,608	0.8	341	0.2	472	0.2	129	0.1
Hodh El Gharbi	112,060	95.2	4,186	3.6	513	0.4	788	0.7	165	0.1
Inchiri	12,439	94.9	557	4.2	21	0.2	67	0.5	23	0.2
Nouakchott	63,489	69.4	22,763	24.9	2,314	2.5	1,739	1.9	1,190	1.3
Tagant	31,236	94.1	784	2.4	844	2.5	172	0.5	169	0.5
Tiris Zemmour	7,431	59.4	3,962	31.7	889	7.1	133	1.1	89	0.7
Trarza	120,099	95.9	4,018	3.2	281	0.2	539	0.4	299	0.2
Source: Nohlen et al.
