= Union of Democratic Forces (Mauritania) =

Union of Democratic Forces - New Era
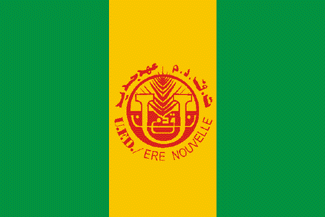
- Secretary-General: Ahmed Ould Daddah
- Founded: 1991
- Dissolved: October 2000
- Succeeded by: Rally of Democratic Forces

The Union of Democratic Forces-New Era (Union des Forces Démocratiques-Ère Nouvelle) was a political party in Mauritania, founded in 1991, and banned and dissolved in 2000. The Secretary-general of the party was Ahmed Ould Daddah. In February 1997 the five-party Front of Opposition Parties (FPO), including the UFD-EN, was formed; it boycotted the December 1997 presidential election, in which President Maaouya Ould Sid'Ahmed Taya was easily re-elected.

The party was weakened by a number of splits during its existence. In 1998, a faction of the party led by Mohamed Ould Maouloud, which was known as the UFD/B and later became the Union of the Forces of Progress, split from the faction under Daddah's leadership. The UFD-EN under Daddah's leadership boycotted the January 1999 local election, in which the faction under Ould Maouloud participated.

In October 2000, the UFD-EN was dissolved by the Government, which alleged that it incited violence and harmed national interests. A successor party, the Rally of Democratic Forces (RFD), was subsequently established, with Daddah as its president.
