= Ahmed Ould Daddah =

Mauritanian economist and politician

- أحمد ولد داداه
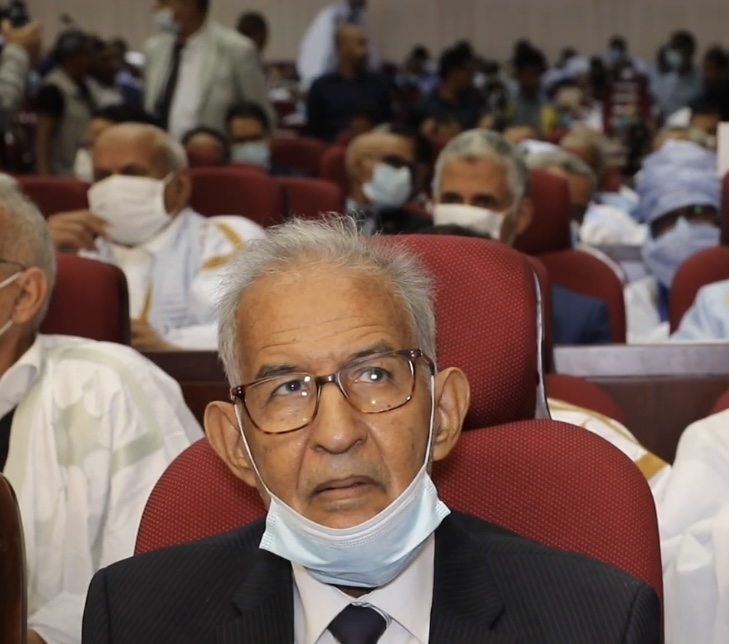

Personal details
- Born: August 7, 1942 (age 84) Boutilimit, Mauritania, French West Africa
- Party: Rally of Democratic Forces (RFD)
- Relations: Moktar Ould Daddah (half-brother)
- Education: University of Paris
- Occupation: Politician, Civil Servant
- Profession: Economist

Ahmed Ould Daddah (Arabic: أحمد ولد داداه, born 7 August 1942) is a Mauritanian economist and a politician. He is a half-brother of Moktar Ould Daddah, the first President of Mauritania, and belongs to the Marabout Ouled Birri tribe. He is currently the President of the Rally of Democratic Forces (RFD) and was designated as the official Leader of the opposition following the 2007 presidential election, in which he came second.

== Early life and education ==
Ould Daddah was born in Boutilimit, then part of French West Africa, on 7 August 1942. He is the younger brother to former Mauritanian President Moktar Ould Daddah. He attended primary school in Boutilimit, and then received his secondary education at the Lycée Van Vollenhoven in Dakar.

After graduating he travelled to Paris to attend university, studying economics at the Faculté de Droit et Sciences Economiques de Paris of the University of Paris, and graduating in the mid-1960s.

== Early career ==
After graduating from university Daddah returned to Mauritania and worked as an economic and financial Adviser to his brother, President Moktar Ould Daddah, from 1967 to 1968. He then served as Executive-Secretary to the Organisation des États Riverains du Sénégal from August 1968 through March 1971, and during his tenure laid much of the groundwork for what later became the Organisation pour la mise en valeur du fleuve Sénégal (OMVS).

Daddah began his career in 1971 as the Director-General of the National Import-Export Company of Mauritania (Sonimex). In 1973, he began a stint as the Governor of the Central Bank of Mauritania, ending in May 1978. He then served briefly in the Government as Minister of Finance and Commerce in 1978, until his brother was ousted in a military coup on 10 July 1978.

Later, he was an economist for the World Bank from 1986 to 1991, advising the Government of the Central African Republic.

== Under Ould Taya ==
Returning to Mauritania in 1991, he ran for president against Maaouya Ould Sid'Ahmed Taya in January 1992 and took second place with 32.73% of the vote, behind Ould Taya. Also in 1992, he became Secretary-General of the Union of Democratic Forces-New Era (UFD-EN), an opposition party.

Ould Daddah was arrested in January 1995, along with another opposition leader, Hamdi Ould Mouknass of the Union for Democracy and Progress (UDP) and a number of other activists, following the outbreak of riots regarding the price of bread. Their parties were accused of instigating the violence, but they denied this, saying that it happened spontaneously and that they were opposed to the rioting. Although placed under house arrest, they were not charged and in early February 1995 they were released.

In February 1997, the UFD-EN formed the Front of Opposition Parties (FPO) with four other parties. The FPO boycotted the December 1997 presidential election, which was easily won by Ould Taya.

On 16 December 1998, Daddah was arrested in the capital, Nouakchott, along with two other people associated with the UFD-EN, Mohameden Ould Babah and Mohameden Ould Ichiddou. This followed a meeting of the FPO, of which Daddah was president. They were held at Boumdeid under poor conditions until 17 January 1999, when they were released; they were subsequently acquitted of inciting intolerance and acts likely to breach public order in March 1999. In April 2000, Daddah was arrested and held for five days after calling for a mass meeting in the Capital regarding the alleged weakness of the rule of law and the lack of investigation into the violence of the late 1980s and early 1990s. He was again held for three days in December 2000, but was not charged and released.

In October 2000, the UFD-EN was dissolved by the Mauritanian Government for allegedly inciting violence and harming the country's interests and peace. In its place a new opposition party was set up, the Rally of Democratic Forces (RFD), and Daddah was elected its President in January 2002.

Daddah ran again in the presidential election of 7 November 2003 and took third place with 6.89%, behind Maaouya Ould Sid'Ahmed Taya and Mohamed Khouna Ould Haidalla. On 8 November, together with Ould Haidalla and another opposition candidate, Messoud Ould Boulkheir, he alleged "fraud" and urged the people to reject the results.

On 3 November 2004, Daddah was again arrested along with Haidalla and Cheikh Ould Horma; they were accused of involvement in coup plots and were put on trial. The prosecutor sought a five-year prison sentence for Daddah, but at the end of the trial, in which there were 195 defendants, he was acquitted on 3 February 2005.

== Under military and civilian rule ==
Maaouya Ould Sid'Ahmed Taya was overthrown in a coup on August 3, 2005, and a transitional military regime held new elections in late 2006 and early 2007. Daddah declared the RFD to be "the country's biggest political force" after the first round of the 2006 Mauritanian parliamentary election, held on 19 November. The RFD participated in this election as part of an eight-party opposition alliance. In Kiffa on January 12, 2007, Daddah announced his candidacy in the March 2007 presidential election. In the first round, held on 11 March, he won 20.69% of the vote, in second place behind Sidi Ould Cheikh Abdallahi, who won 24.80%. In the second round of the election, held on 25 March, Daddah was defeated by Abdallahi, taking 47.15% of the vote against Abdallahi's 52.85%. Daddah won in three of the country's 13 regions: in Nouakchott, in Inchiri Region, and in Trarza Region, where he is from. Daddah accepted the results and congratulated Abdallahi on his victory.

On 30 May 2007, Ould Daddah was designated as the official Leader of the opposition by the Constitutional Court.

== After the 2008 coup ==
Daddah and the RFD supported the military coup d'état of 6 August 2008. Speaking to Al Jazeera on 12 August, Daddah described the bloodless coup as "a movement to rectify the democratic process" and alleged that the 2007 presidential election was "marked by fraud".

On 4 February 2009, while still expressing support for the coup and saying that Abdallahi should not be restored to the Presidency, Daddah proposed that the army give up power and that anyone who was serving in the military at the time of the coup should not be allowed to participate in the planned 2009 presidential election. He expressed concern that continued military rule would negatively affect Mauritania's relations with the rest of the world, potentially including economic sanctions. Daddah and the RFD initially chose to boycott the 2009 presidential election, decrying the junta's allegedly unilateral timetable.

After the junta and the opposition reached an agreement and the election was delayed to 18 July 2009, the RFD announced on 9 June 2009 that Daddah had been designated as the party's presidential candidate by a special party congress. He came in third place and won 13.66% of the vote, placed behind general Mohamed Ould Abdel Aziz and Messoud Ould Boulkheir.
