= 1991 Mauritanian constitutional referendum =

Constitutional referendum

- 12 July 1991

Results
Choice	Votes	%
Yes	713,493	97.94%
No	14,999	2.06%
Valid votes	728,492	99.59%
Invalid or blank votes	3,020	0.41%
Total votes	731,512	100.00%
Registered voters/turnout	857,121	85.35%

A constitutional referendum was held in Mauritania on 12 July 1991. The new constitution would restore multi-party democracy for the first time since the 1960s, as well as creating a bicameral Parliament with a Senate and National Assembly. The constitution would not include term limits for the President.

It was approved by 98% of voters with an 85% turnout.

== Results ==
Choice	Votes	%
For	713,493	97.94
Against	14,999	2.06
Total	728,492	100.00
Valid votes	728,492	99.59
Invalid/blank votes	3,020	0.41
Total votes	731,512	100.00
Registered voters/turnout	857,121	85.35
Source: African Elections Database
