= Sidi Ould Cheikh Abdallahi =

President of Mauritania from 2007 to 2008

- سيدي محمد ولد الشيخ عبد الله
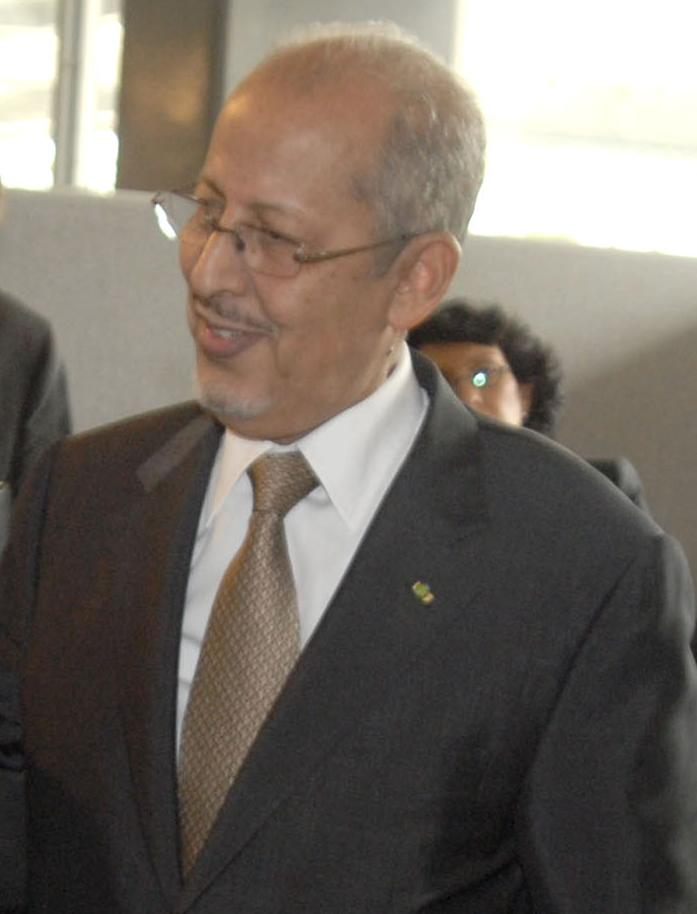
- Sidi Mohamed in 2007

7th President of Mauritania
- In office 19 April 2007 – 6 August 2008
- Prime Minister: Sidi Mohamed Ould Boubacar; Zeine Ould Zeidane; Yahya Ould Ahmed El Waghef
- Preceded by: Ely Ould Mohamed Vall (as Chairman of the Military Council for Justice and Democracy)
- Succeeded by: Mohamed Ould Abdel Aziz (as President of the High Council of State)

Personal details
- Born: 18 August 1938 Lamden, Brakna, Mauritania, French West Africa
- Died: 22 November 2020 (aged 82) Nouakchott, Mauritania
- Party: Independent
- Other political affiliations: ADIL
- Spouse: Khattou Mint El Boukhari

Sidi Mohamed Ould Cheikh Abdallahi (Arabic: سيدي محمد ولد الشيخ عبد الله; 1938 – 22 November 2020) was a Mauritanian politician who was President of Mauritania from 2007 to 2008. He served in the government during the 1970s, and after a long period of absence from politics he won the March 2007 presidential election, taking office on 19 April 2007. He was deposed in a military coup d'état on 6 August 2008.

== Early life and education ==
Sidi was born in 1938 in the village of Lamden, near Aleg in southern Mauritania when it was a French colony, about 250 kilometres from the capital Nouakchott. He received his primary education in Aleg and his secondary education in Rosso, Mauritania and then at the École normale supérieure William Ponty in Senegal.

He subsequently studied mathematics, physics, and chemistry in Dakar, Senegal and received a diplôme d'études approfondies in economics in Grenoble, France.

== Civil service ==
In 1968, Sidi returned to Mauritania to become Director of the Plan. He worked on the Second Plan for Economic and Social Development. In 1971, he was appointed as Minister of Planning and Industrial Development in September 1971 by the first post-independence president, Moktar Ould Daddah. During the 1970s he served in a series of positions in the government, including that of Minister of State for the National Economy in 1975 and Minister of Planning and Mines in 1976. As Minister of Planning and Mines he was involved in the nationalization of the iron mines and the introduction of the ouguiya as the nation's currency. He was Minister of National Economy from 1975 to 1977.

Following the coup d'état that ousted President Daddah in July 1978, Sidi was imprisoned until April 1979. From 1982 to late 1985 Sidi lived in Kuwait, where he worked as an adviser to the Kuwait Fund for Arab Economic Development.

When he returned to Mauritania in 1986, he served in the government under President Maaouya Ould Sid'Ahmed Taya. Under the Taya administration, he served as Minister of Hydraulics and Energy in 1986 and then as Minister of Fishing and the Maritime Economy in 1987. After a clash with influential businessmen over fishing policies, he was replaced on 21 September 1987. From September 1989 until June 2003, he lived in Niger, working again for the Kuwait Fund as an adviser.

== 2007 presidential election ==
Sidi announced his candidacy for president on 4 July 2006. He ran as an independent and was viewed by some as the candidate representing the ruling Military Council for Justice and Democracy.

The Coalition of Forces for Democratic Change, which won a large portion of the seats in parliament in the 2006 parliamentary election, sent a letter to various international organizations, including the African Union, accusing the junta of "running an open campaign in favor of one candidate" through various methods, including asking influential people in the country to back their favored candidate, although the letter did not directly name Sidi as this candidate.

In the first round of the election, held on 11 March 2007, Sidi took first place with 24.80% of the vote. A second round was planned for 25 March between Sidi and the second-place candidate, Ahmed Ould Daddah. On 17 March, the third-place candidate, Zeine Ould Zeidane, announced his support for Sidi in the second round. Fourth-place candidate Messaoud Ould Boulkheir also announced his support for Sidi on 19 March.

Following the second round of polling, Interior Minister Mohamed Ahmed Ould Mohamed Lemine declared Sidi the winner on 26 March, saying that he won 52.85% of the vote. Abdallahi won 10 of the country's 13 regions.

He took office on 19 April 2007 and named Zeidane as Prime Minister on the next day.

== Presidency ==
After the government announced a US$112 million budget deficit, mostly due to shortfalls in oil exports due to technical problems, the president decided to take a 25% pay cut and encourage other members of the government to do so on 7 June 2007.

Sidi addressed the nation on 29 June for the first time since taking office. In this speech, he referred to the "dark years" of 1989–1991, condemning the violence of that time, expressing compassion for its victims, and emphasizing the importance of tolerance and reconciliation. He said that "the State will entirely assume its responsibility to ensure the return" of Mauritanian refugees and promised that they could all "benefit from a reintegration program in their native lands with the support of the HCR, the Mauritanian state, united national effort and the cooperation of our development partners." He also mentioned an anti-slavery bill approved by the government.

Plans by Sidi's supporters to create a new party to back him were initiated in 2007; the opposition criticized this as potentially meaning a return to a single-party dominant system, as existed under Taya. The party, the National Pact for Democracy and Development (ADIL), was established at a constitutive congress in early January 2008.

On 26 September 2007, while Sidi was at the United Nations in New York City, he met a delegation of the African Liberation Forces of Mauritania (FLAM), a movement seeking the improvement of the conditions of black Mauritanians; this marked the first talks between a Mauritanian head of state and FLAM since it was banned in 1986.

=== 2008 coup d'etat ===
Early in the morning of 6 August 2008, Sidi replaced senior army officers; at 9:20 am he was seized from his home by members of the BASEP (Presidential Security Battalion) in a military coup. Presidential spokesman Abdoulaye Mamadouba said that Sidi, Prime Minister Yahya Ould Ahmed Waghef, and the Interior Minister, were arrested by renegade senior army officers, unknown troops, and a group of generals, and were held under house arrest at the presidential palace in Nouakchott.

In the apparently successful and bloodless coup d'état, Sidi's daughter, Amal Mint Cheikh Abdallahi, said: "The security agents of the BASEP (Presidential Security Battalion) came to our home and took away my father." The coup plotters were top fired security forces, including General Mohamed Ould Abdel Aziz, General Muhammad Ould Al-Ghazwani, General Philippe Swikri, and Brigadier General (Aqid) Ahmed Ould Bakri. Member of parliament Mohammed Al Mukhtar claimed widespread popular support for the coup, saying that Sidi had headed "an authoritarian regime" and had "marginalized the majority in parliament".

The coup leaders announced on 7 August that Sidi's powers had been terminated and that a newly formed High Council of State (including General Mohamed as its president) would govern the nation in a transitional period leading to a new presidential election "as soon as possible".

On 8 August, Sidi's daughter said that she had not been informed of his whereabouts, and she expressed concern for Sidi's "health and safety". Meanwhile, Mohamed said in an interview with Jeune Afrique that the military had been forced to take power by serious economic and political problems. He accused Sidi of attempting a "coup against democracy" through his actions; according to Mohamed, Sidi had set members of parliament against one another and his dismissal of the senior officers immediately prior to the coup was intended to "divide the army". Mohamed also said that Sidi was being held at the Palace of Congress, was "in good conditions", had not complained, and would be released in a matter of days or weeks. According to Mohamed, Sidi would probably not be required to leave Mauritania and would probably still be allowed to participate in politics. However, Mohamed was quoted in an interview with Asharq al-Awsat published on 9 August as saying Sidi would not be released for "the time being", citing "security reasons".

Waghef and three other high-ranking officials (including the Interior Minister) were released by the military on 11 August, while Sidi remained in custody. A few hours later, Waghef spoke before a rally of thousands of people and expressed defiance toward the military junta, saying that Mauritanians did not accept its rule and urging the people to continue struggling to restore Sidi to power. He said that Sidi thanked them for their "untiring fight ... to restore constitutional order".

Arab League Assistant Secretary-General Ahmed bin Heli said on 11 August, after returning from Mauritania, that he had asked to meet with Sidi but was not allowed to do so. Jean Ping, the Chairman of the Commission of the African Union, held talks with Mohamed on 25–26 August, and in a statement on 30 August, the African Union Commission said that Mohamed had committed to releasing Sidi during his talks with Ping. On 2 September 2008, the Mauritanian Parliament, meeting in a special session, chose four deputies and four senators to sit as a High Court that would try Sidi on allegations such as corruption and obstruction of Parliament; however, no further steps have been taken since.

Four human rights groups met with Sidi, who was still being held by the Army, on 19 October. One of those who met with him said that "his morale was high and he's following the news on the television and the radio" and that he wanted to be allowed to publicly defend his actions as president, as well as meet with supporters. He was taken from Nouakchott to his home village of Lemden on 13 November.

According to the government, Sidi agreed to leave politics, but at a news conference on 13 November Sidi denied that he had promised the junta anything. He also said that being moved to Lemden was meaningless because he "remain[ed] a president under house arrest". On 20 November, Sidi said in an interview that "once the coup is thwarted" he would "be open to all dialogue to discuss the future of the democratic institutions of the country in the framework of the constitution and the laws of the country". In an interview published on 20 December, Sidi said that he would not take part in the national consultation meeting planned for 27 December, despite being invited by the junta, as he felt his participation would "legitimize the coup d'etat". Sidi was taken out of Lemden by security forces in the early hours of 21 December, driven to Nouakchott, and then released on the same day.

== Later life ==
Sidi subsequently returned to Lemden. On 22 January 2009, he attempted to travel to Nouakchott to deliver a speech, but his motorcade was stopped by security forces at Wad Naga, outside of the city. The security forces said that he was not allowed into Nouakchott with a motorcade, but Sidi was unwilling to enter the city without his motorcade and instead chose to return to Lemden.

Sidi later retired from politics. After suffering heart trouble, he died in a private clinic in Nouakchott on 22 November 2020. President Mohamed Ould Ghazouani, who had succeeded Aziz in 2019, announced three days of national mourning.

Political offices
Preceded by Ely Ould Mohamed Vall as Chairman of the Military Council for Justice and Democracy	President of Mauritania; 2007–2008	Succeeded by Mohamed Ould Abdel Aziz as President of the High Council of State
