= Republican Party for Democracy and Renewal =

Political party in Mauritania

Republican Party for Democracy and Renewal الحزب الجمهوري للديموقراطية والتجديد Parti républicain pour la démocratie et le renouvellement
- Secretary-General: Mintata Mint Hedeid
- Founder: Maaouya Ould Sid'Ahmed Taya
- Founded: 1992
- Dissolved: 19 October 2023
- Headquarters: Nouakchott
- Ideology: Liberal conservatism Atlanticism
- Political position: Right-wing
- National Assembly: 0 / 176
- Regional councils: 1 / 285
- Mayors: 1 / 238

Website
- www.prdr.mr

The Republican Party for Democracy and Renewal (Arabic: الحزب الجمهوري للديموقراطية والتجديد; French: Parti républicain pour la démocratie et le renouvellement, PRDR) was a political party in Mauritania. Formerly known as the Democratic and Social Republican Party, (French: Parti Républicain Démocratique et Social, PRDS) the party changed its identity and adjusted its political stance after the 2005 coup. Formerly very supportive of President Maaouya Ould Sid'Ahmed Taya and his policies, after the August 2005 coup, the party denounced Taya's policies and the mid-2006 Israeli military campaign in Lebanon.

In the 2001 parliamentary elections, the party won 64 out of 81 seats.

Sidi Mohamed Ould Boubacar, one of the bloc's members, was nominated as Prime Minister a few days after the 2005 coup.

The now-PRDR won seven seats in the November–December 2006 parliamentary election and in the 21 January and 4 February 2007 Senate elections, three out of 56 seats.

As of 2008, the PRDR is part of the Mithaq El Wihda coalition and is led by Sidi Mohamed Ould Mohamed Vall.

== Electoral history ==
=== Presidential elections ===
Election	Party candidate	Votes	%	Result
1992	Maaouya Ould Sid'Ahmed Taya	345,583	62.7%	Elected ✓
1997	Maaouya Ould Sid'Ahmed Taya	801,190	90.9%	Elected ✓
2003	Maaouya Ould Sid'Ahmed Taya	438,915	67%	Elected ✓

=== National Assembly elections ===
Election	Party leader	Votes		%	Seats	+/–	Position	Result
1992	Maaouya Ould Sid'Ahmed Taya	301,349		67.7%	67 / 79	▲67	▲1st	Supermajority government
1996	Maaouya Ould Sid'Ahmed Taya	352,482		67.6%	70 / 79	▲3	1st	Supermajority government
2001	Maaouya Ould Sid'Ahmed Taya	285,623		57.0%	64 / 81	▼6	1st	Supermajority government
2006					7 / 95	▼57	▼4th	Opposition
2013	Sidi Mohamed Ould Mohamed Vall	27,619		4.6%	3 / 146	▼4	▼14th	Opposition
2018	Sidi Mohamed Ould Mohamed Vall	National PR seats	5,533	0.79%	0 / 157	▼3	▼25th	Extra-parliamentary
2018	Sidi Mohamed Ould Mohamed Vall	Women's seats	8,315	1.20%	0 / 157	▼3	▼25th	Extra-parliamentary

=== Senate elections ===
Election	Votes	%	Seats	+/–	Position	Result
2007	231	6.46%	3 / 56	▲3	▲4th	Opposition
