= Rally of Democratic Forces =

Rally of Democratic Forces تكتل القوى الديمقراطية Rassemblement des forces démocratiques
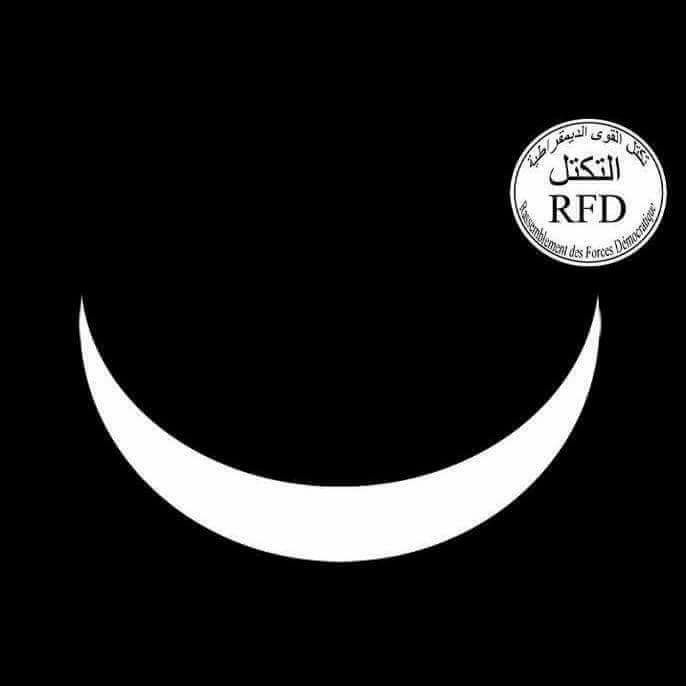
- President: Ahmed Ould Daddah
- Founded: 2002
- Preceded by: Union of Democratic Forces
- Headquarters: Ilôt K N° 120, Nouakchott
- Ideology: Social democracy
- Political position: Centre-left
- International affiliation: Socialist International; Progressive Alliance
- Colors: Black
- Anthem: Rally of Democratic Forces (by Malouma)
- National Assembly: 0 / 176
- Regional councils: 2 / 285
- Mayors: 0 / 238

The Rally of Democratic Forces (Arabic: تكتل القوى الديمقراطية; French: Rassemblement des forces démocratiques, RFD), or Assembly of Democratic Forces, is a political party in Mauritania. It is led by Ahmed Ould Daddah.

In October 2000, the Union of Democratic Forces-New Era, which was led by Daddah, was dissolved by the Mauritanian Government for allegedly inciting violence and harming the country's interests. In its place the Rally of Democratic Forces was established, and Daddah was elected its president in January 2002.

In the parliamentary election held on October 19 and 26 October 2001, the party won 5.6% of the popular vote and three out of 81 seats.

Daddah declared the RFD to be "the country's biggest political force" after the first round of the 2006 Mauritanian parliamentary election, held on 19 November. The RFD participated in this election as part of an eight-party opposition alliance. It won 15 out of 95 seats, in the 21 January and 4 February 2007 Senate elections seven out of 56 seats. In the 11 March and 25 March 2007 presidential election, Daddah, the party's candidate, won 20.69% in the first round, but was defeated in the second round with 47.15%.

Daddah said on May 7, 2008, that the RFD would not participate in the government of Prime Minister Yahya Ould Ahmed El Waghef, despite Waghef's consultations with opposition parties regarding the formation of a new government.

The RFD supported the military coup d'état of August 6, 2008. Daddah described the coup as "a movement to rectify the democratic process" and alleged that the 2007 presidential election was "marked by fraud".

The RFD is an observer member of the Socialist International.

== Electoral performance ==
=== National Assembly ===
National Assembly
Election	Party leader	National list		Seats	+/–	Government
Election	Party leader	Votes	%	Seats	+/–	Government
2001	Ahmed Ould Daddah	—		3 / 81	▲3	Opposition
2006	Ahmed Ould Daddah	—		16 / 95	13	Opposition
2013	Ahmed Ould Daddah	Boycotted		0 / 146	▼16	Opposition
2018	Ahmed Ould Daddah	19,273	2.74%	3 / 157	▲3	Opposition
2023	Ahmed Ould Daddah	14,648	1.51%	0 / 176	▼3	Opposition
