= Maaouya Ould Sid'Ahmed Taya =

President of Mauritania from 1984 to 2005

- معاوية ولد سيد أحمد ولد الطايع
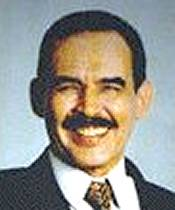
- Ould Taya in 2003

5th President of Mauritania
- In office 12 December 1984 – 3 August 2005
- Preceded by: Mohamed Khouna Ould Haidalla
- Succeeded by: Ely Ould Mohamed Vall

5th Prime Minister of Mauritania
- In office 25 April 1981 – 8 March 1984
- Preceded by: Sid'Ahmed Bneijara
- Succeeded by: Mohamed Khouna Ould Haidalla
- In office 12 December 1984 – 18 April 1992
- Preceded by: Mohamed Khouna Ould Haidalla
- Succeeded by: Sidi Mohamed Ould Boubacar

Chief of Army Staff
- In office 15 July 1980 – 26 March 1981
- Preceded by: Ahmedou Ould Abdallah
- Succeeded by: Yall Abdoulaye Alassane
- In office 8 March 1984 – 12 December 1984
- Preceded by: Yall Abdoulaye Alassane
- Succeeded by: Ahmedou Ould Abdallah

Personal details
- Born: 28 November 1941 (age 84) Atar, French Mauritania
- Party: Democratic Republican Party for Renewal (PRDS)
- Spouse: Aicha Mint Ahmed Tolba

Military service
- Branch/service: Mauritanian Army
- Years of service: 1961–1992
- Rank: Colonel
- Battles/wars: Western Sahara War

Maaouya Ould Sid'Ahmed Ould Taya (Note: Hassaniyya: معاوية ولد سيد احمد ولد الطايع. His name is variously spelled as Maouya, Mawiya, Muawiya and other variants.) (born 28 November 1941) is a Mauritanian military officer and politician who served as the President of Mauritania from 1984 to 2005. He also served as the fifth Prime minister of Mauritania from 1981 to 1992 except for a brief period in 1984.

Born in Atar, French West Africa, Ould Taya studied at Franco-Arab school and then French military school. He participated in the Western Sahara War against the Polisario Front. Ould Taya was appointed Chief of the Army staff in July 1980 and then as Prime minister in April 1981 after an unsuccessful coup attempt against Mohamed Haidalla.

Having come to power through a bloodless military coup, he won the 2003 elections and was ousted by a military coup in 2005. During his presidency, he pursued policies of Arab nationalism and deepening ties with the United States. He established close relations with Saddam Hussein of Iraq and had a pro-Iraqi stance on the Gulf War.

== Early life and education ==
Maaouya Ould Sidi Ahmed Ould Taya was born on 28 November 1941 in Atar, then part of French Mauritania. Ould Taya attended a Franco-Arabic Primary School from 1949 to 1955. He then attended Rosso High School in southern Mauritania. After graduation, he attended a French military school in 1960 and graduated as an officer the next year. In 1975, he received strategic training at the French war academy.

In 1978, the Mauritanian Army overthrew Moktar Ould Daddah, the first President of Mauritania, in an attempt to forestall government collapse in the war over Western Sahara against the Polisario Front. Ould Taya was among the conspirators, and quickly gained influence within the government.

== Presidency (1984–2005) ==
After holding various positions in the military, Ould Taya was appointed Chief of Staff of the Army in July 1980, during the rule of military head of state Mohamed Khouna Ould Haidalla.

In the aftermath of a failed coup against Haidalla in March 1981, Ould Taya was appointed Prime minister on 25 April 1981, replacing civilian Prime minister Sid'Ahmed Ould Bneijara. He held this office until 8 March 1984, when Haidalla, who was still head of state, took over the post.

On 12 December 1984, while Haidalla was out of the country, Ould Taya seized power and declared himself Chairman of the Military Committee for National Salvation (CMSN).

In October 1987, Ould Taya's military government allegedly uncovered a tentative coup d'état by a group of black army officers, backed, according to the authorities, by Senegal. Several officers were arrested, interrogated, and possibly tortured, leading to the acquittal of only seven.

=== Mauritania–Senegal border conflict ===
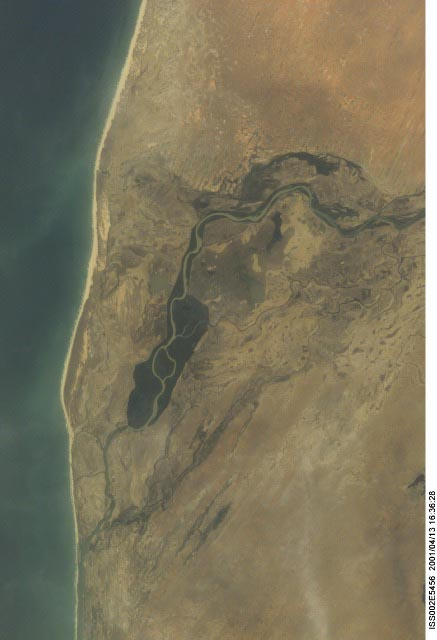
Site of the Mauritania–Senegal border conflict

The discord between conflicting visions of Mauritanian society as either black or Arab again rose to the surface during the intercommunal violence that broke out in April 1989. This tension grew when the Mauritania–Senegal border dispute escalated into violence between the two nations.

Even before the war, Ould Taya and Abdou Diouf, president of Senegal at the time, had been engaged in a dispute after the completion of dams on the Senegal River. Ould Taya argued that Senegalese representatives in the OMVS had refused to create river harbors during construction, diminishing Mauritania's ability to exploit phosphate deposits.

Heightened ethnic tensions created an additional catalyst for the Mauritania–Senegal border conflict, which started as a result of a conflict in Diawara between Moorish Mauritanian herders and Senegalese farmers over grazing rights. The border between Senegal and Mauritania was then closed, and the two nations ended diplomatic ties with each other.

As the war continued, some Fula and Soninke people were arrested and executed. Al-Taya's government initiated a military investigation before implementing a law of amnesty.

In July 1991, presidents Diouf and Ould Taya reached an agreement to end hostilities. On 18 July, Senegal and Mauritania signed a peace treaty, ending the Mauritania–Senegal border conflict, and on 2 May 1992, the borders reopened to all civilians.

=== Arab nationalism and foreign policy ===
the late 1980s, Ould Taya had established close co-operation with Iraq, and pursued a strongly Arab nationalist line. Mauritania grew increasingly isolated internationally, and tensions with Western countries grew dramatically after it took a pro-Iraqi position during the Gulf War, although he had received French support and aid in 1984-1987.

=== Transition to democracy and multi-party system ===
Ould Taya's regime began a transition to civilian, multiparty government in 1991; a new Constitution was approved by referendum in July.

The first multiparty presidential elections were held in January 1992. Ould Taya, as candidate of the newly formed Democratic and Social Republican Party (PRDS), received nearly 63% of the vote, amid opposition claims of serious irregularities and fraud. He won slightly more than 90% of the vote in the following 12 December 1997 presidential election, which was boycotted by major opposition political parties; anticipating fraud, they said that this would make their participation "futile".

=== Last years in office ===
The last years of Ould Taya's rule were marred by unrest within the military and hostility between the regime and the country's Islamists. Ould Taya moved away from his initial support of the Iraqi regime of Saddam Hussein at the time of the Gulf War, and moved towards the West.

On 28 October 1999, Mauritania joined Egypt, Palestine, and Jordan as the fourth member of the Arab League to officially recognize Israel. By doing so, Ould Taya formally ended a declared war on Israel that dated from the Six-Day War of June 1967.

During his administration, Ould Taya also began co-operating with the United States in counterterrorism activities, a policy that was criticized by some human rights organizations. Increasing ties with Israel and the United States served to deepen the opposition to his rule.

In June 2003, Ould Taya's government survived a coup attempt, defeating rebel soldiers after two days of heavy fighting in the capital, Nouakchott; the coup leader, Saleh Ould Hanenna, initially escaped capture. Ould Hanenna announced the formation of a rebel group called "the Knights of Change" but was eventually captured in October 2004 and sentenced to life in prison along with other alleged plotters in early 2005. On 7 November 2003 a presidential election was held, which was won by al-Taya with over 67% of the popular vote. The opposition again denounced the result as fraudulent; the second-place candidate, former ruler Ould Haidalla, was arrested both immediately before and after the election, and was accused of plotting a coup. In August 2004, the government arrested more alleged coup plotters, who it said had planned to overthrow al-Taya when he took a planned trip to France; some, however, doubted the existence of this plot and suspected that it was a pretext for a crackdown. In late September, the government claimed to have thwarted yet another plot to oust Ould Taya.

Anticipating an increase in government revenue through the exploitation of natural resources, particularly offshore oil deposits, al-Taya announced an increase in pay for the civil service and pensions in November 2004.

== Overthrow and exile ==
While Ould Taya was out of the country for the funeral of King Fahd of Saudi Arabia in early August 2005, soldiers seized government buildings and the state media. The group, which identified itself as the Military Council for Justice and Democracy (CMJD), announced a coup d'état in a statement run by the state news agency on 3 August: "The armed forces and security forces have unanimously decided to put an end to the totalitarian practices of the deposed regime under which our people have suffered much over the last several years."

The new military dictatorship said it would remain in power for a maximum of two years to allow time for democratic institutions to be implemented. The Military Council for Justice and Democracy named Col. Ely Ould Mohamed Vall, a top associate of al-Taya for many years, as its head.

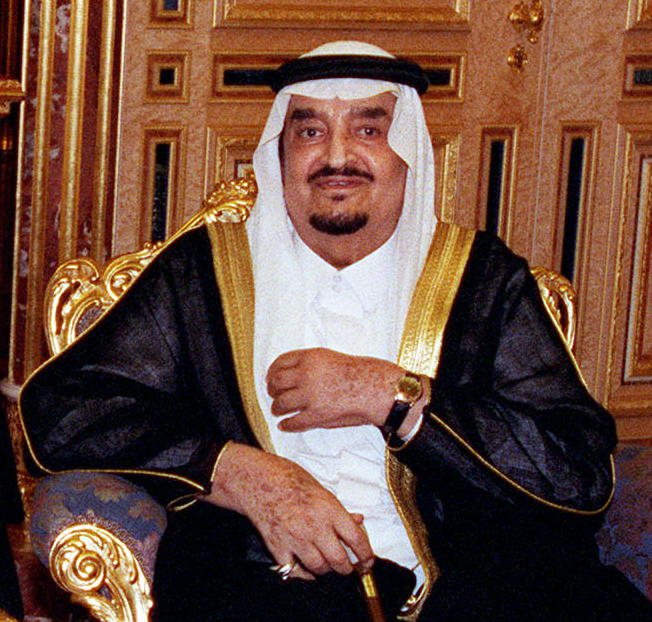
Al-Taya was ousted while attending the funeral of Saudi King Fahd.

Ould Taya, on his way back from Fahd's funeral, landed in Niamey, the capital of Niger. He met Niger's president Mamadou Tandja before going to a villa in Niamey. Speaking to Radio France Internationale on 5 August, Ould Taya condemned the coup, saying that there had "never been a more senseless coup in Africa" and that it reminded him of the adage "God save me from my friends, I'll take care of my enemies".

On 8 August, he unsuccessfully attempted to order the Armed forces to restore him to power. Broad support for the coup appeared to exist across the country; Ould Taya's own party, PRDS, abandoned him a few days after the coup by endorsing the new regime's transitional plan. International reaction to Ould Taya's overthrow was initially strongly hostile, including the suspension of Mauritania from the African Union, but after several days the new rulers were apparently diplomatically successful in winning tacit international acceptance of their transitional regime. The United States in particular at first called for Ould Taya to be restored to power but subsequently backed away from this.

=== After presidency ===
He left Niger for Banjul, Gambia, on 9 August 2005. After nearly two weeks there, he and his family flew to Qatar, where they arrived on 22 August.

In April 2006, Ould Mohamed Vall said that Ould Taya could return home as a free citizen, but would not be allowed to take part in the elections that were to mark the end of the transition because, Vall said, his participation could disrupt the transitional process; however, Ould Mohamed Vall said that he would be able to return to politics after the completion of the transition.

In the March 2007 presidential election, Ould Taya is said to have favored former Central Bank Governor Zeine Ould Zeidane.

In late 2013, Ould Taya was appointed a teacher at the Ahmed Bin Mohammad Military School, a military academy in Qatar.

== Sources ==
- Bekaye, Sheikh (9 June 2003). "Mauritanian Leader Under Fire". Washington Post. ISSN 0190-8286.

Political offices
Preceded by Sid'Ahmed Ould Bneijara	Prime Minister of Mauritania; 1981–1984	Succeeded by Mohamed Khouna Ould Haidalla
Preceded by Mohamed Khouna Ould Haidalla	Prime Minister of Mauritania; 1984–1992	Succeeded by Sidi Mohamed Ould Boubacar
Preceded by Mohamed Khouna Ould Haidalla	President of Mauritania; 1984–2005	Succeeded by Colonel Ely Ould Mohamed Vall
