= Ould =

Ould is an English surname as well as an element of many Arabic names. In Arabic contexts it is a transliteration of the word ولد, meaning "son".

Notable people with this surname include:

== English surname ==
- Charles Ould (1835–1913), cellist, head of musical family
- Edward Ould (1852–1909), English architect
- Fielding Ould (1710–1789), Irish doctor
- Johnny Ould (born 1940), British boxer
- Robert Ould (1820–1882), American lawyer

== Arabic name ==
- Ahmed Ould Bouceif (1934–1979), Mauritanian military and political leader
- Ahmed Ould Daddah (born 1942), Mauritanian economist, politician and civil servant
- Ahmed Ould Sid'Ahmed (born 1949), Mauritanian diplomat and politician
- Ahmed Salim Ould Sidi (1939–1981), Mauritanian military and political leader
- Ahmedou Ould-Abdallah (born 1940), Mauritanian diplomat
- Bilal Ould-Chikh (born 1997), Dutch football player
- Cheikh El Avia Ould Mohamed Khouna (born 1956), Mauritanian political figure
- Ely Ould Mohamed Vall (1953–2017), Mauritanian political and military figure
- Ismail Ould Bedde Ould Cheikh Sidiya (born 1961), Mauritanian politician
- Ismail Ould Cheikh Ahmed (born 1960), Mauritanian diplomat and politician
- Mahfouz Ould al-Walid, Mauritanian Islamic scholar and poet previously associated with al-Qaeda
- Mohamed Cheikh Ould Mkhaitir, Mauritanian blogger and political prisoner
- Mohamed Khouna Ould Haidalla (born 1940), Former Head of state of Mauritania
- Mohamed Lamine Ould Ahmed (born 1947), Sahrawi politician, writer and member of the Polisario Front
- Mohamed Lemine Ould Guig (born 1959), Mauritanian academic and political figure
- Mohamed Mahmoud Ould Louly (1943–2019), Mauritanian politician
- Mohamed Ould Abdel Aziz (born 1956), Mauritanian politician
- Mohamed Ould Ghazouani (born 1956)
- Mohamed Salem Ould Béchir, Mauritanian politician
- Moktar Ould Daddah (1924–2003), Former Mauritanian President
- Moulaye Ould Mohamed Laghdaf (born 1957), Mauritanian politician
- Mustafa Ould Salek (1936–2012), Mauritanian politician
- Myriam Ould-Braham (born 1982), French ballet dancer
- Noureddine Ould Ali (born 1972), Algerian football coach
- Omar Ould Hamaha (1963–2014), Mali Islamist militia commander
- Saleh Ould Hanenna (born 1966), Mauritanian soldier and political figure
- Sghair Ould M'Bareck (born 1954), Mauritanian politician
- Sid Ahmed Ould Bneijara (1947–2017), Mauritanian politician
- Sidi Mohamed Ould Boubacar (born 1957), Mauritanian politician
- Sidi Ould Cheikh Abdallahi (1938–2020), Mauritanian politician
- Yahya Ould Ahmed El Waghef (born 1960), Mauritanian politician
- Yahya Ould Hademine (born 1953), Mauritanian engineer and politician
- Zeine Ould Zeidane (born 1966), Mauritanian economist and politician
- Zinédine Ould Khaled (born 2000), French football player

== See also ==
- Auld (surname)
- Oxford University Liberal Democrats
