= List of ambassadors of Mauritania to China =

Coordinates: 39.938348°N 116.457121°E

Ambassador of Mauritania to China
- Incumbent; Abdellahi El Vilaly since February 20, 2019
- Inaugural holder: Mohamed Abdullahi Ould Kharchy
- Formation: 1967

The Mauritanian ambassador in Beijing is the official representative of the Government in Nouakchott to the Government of China.

== List of representatives ==
Diplomatic agrément/Diplomatic accreditation	Ambassador	Observations	List of prime ministers of Mauritania	Premier of the Republic of China	Term end
November 28, 1960		with the independence of Maurethania from France, the governments in Taipei and Nouakchott established mutual recognition.	Moktar Ould Daddah	Chen Cheng	

Diplomatic agrément/Diplomatic accreditation	Ambassador	Observations	List of prime ministers of Mauritania	Premier of the People's Republic of China	Term end
July 19, 1965		The governments in Beijing and Nouakchott established mutual recognition.	Moktar Ould Daddah	Zhou Enlai	
1967	Mohamed Abdullahi Ould Kharchy		Moktar Ould Daddah	Zhou Enlai	1970
1970	Mohamed Ould Sidi Ali		Moktar Ould Daddah	Zhou Enlai	1974
1975	Ahmed Ould Menneya		Moktar Ould Daddah	Zhou Enlai	March 12, 1976
1976	Bakar Ould Sidi Haiba		Moktar Ould Daddah	Hua Guofeng	1978
1978	Ba Mohamed Abdellahi		Moktar Ould Daddah	Hua Guofeng	1982
1983	Abdel Kader Kamara		Maaouya Ould Sid'Ahmed Taya	Zhao Ziyang	1984
1984	Diagana Youssouf	*In 2005 he was Ambassador in London.	Mohamed Khouna Ould Haidalla	Zhao Ziyang	
April 5, 1991	Hamoud Ould Ely		Maaouya Ould Sid'Ahmed Taya	Li Peng	
November 5, 1994	Cheikh Sid Ahmed Ould Babamine	1989–1990: Head of the Ministry of Foreign Affairs (Mauritania)	Sidi Mohamed Ould Boubacar	Li Peng	
May 21, 1999	Abdellahi Ould Abdi		Cheikh El Avia Ould Mohamed Khouna	Zhu Rongji	
August 4, 2003	N'Gaide Lamine Kayou		Sghaïr Ould M'Bareck	Wen Jiabao	2007
December 17, 2007	Sidi Mohamed Ould Amar Taleb	February 18, 2010: ambassador in Moscow	Zeine Ould Zeidane	Wen Jiabao	
March 19, 2010	Bal Mohamed El Habib		Moulaye Ould Mohamed Laghdaf	Wen Jiabao	
