= 2011–2012 Mauritanian protests =

- Part of the Arab Spring
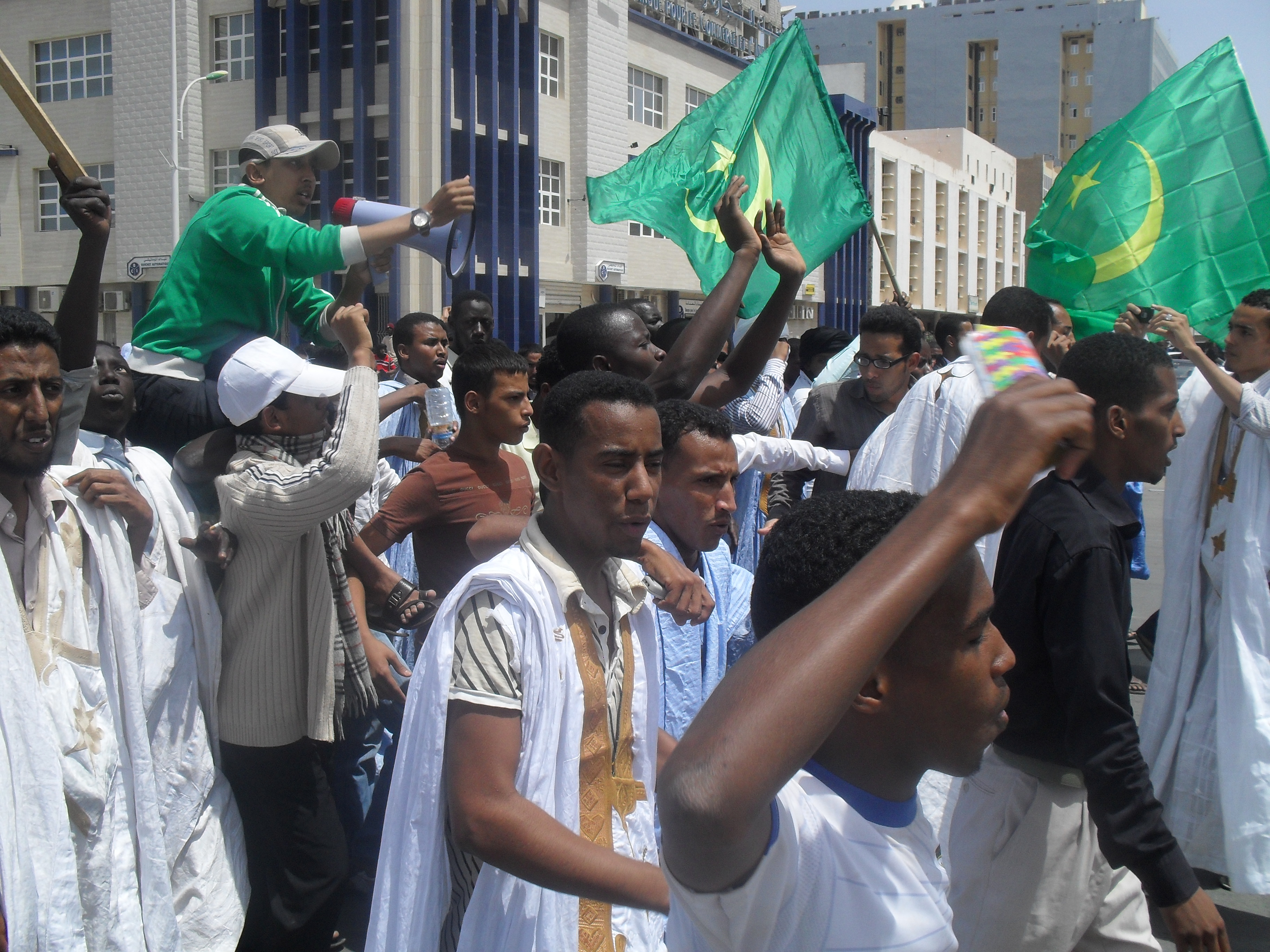
- Mauritanian youth protesters in Nouakchott on 25 April 2011
- Date: 25 February 2011 – 2012
- Location: Mauritania
- Goals: Political and economic changes; End of slavery
- Methods: Demonstrations; Self-immolations; Strike actions

Parties
Mauritanian opposition groups: February 25th Movement; UNEM; Don’t Touch my Nationality movement; IRA Mauritanie; Coordination of Democratic Opposition; Rally of Democratic Forces; Union of the Forces of Progress; Tewassoul Party; People's Progressive Alliance; El Wiam; Mauritanian Party of Union and Change; Popular Rally of Mauritanian People	Mauritanian government: Gendarmerie Nationale

Lead figures
Saleh Ould Hanenna; President of the Coordination of Democratic Opposition	Mohamed Ould Abdel Aziz; President of Mauritania; Moulaye Ould Mohamed Laghdaf; Prime Minister of Mauritania

Casualties
- Deaths: 3
- Injuries: 6

The 2011–2012 Mauritanian protests were a series of protests in Mauritania that started in January 2011, influenced by and concurrent with the Arab Spring, and continued into 2012. The mostly peaceful protest movement demanded that President Mohamed Ould Abdel Aziz institute political, economic, and legal reforms. Common themes of protest centered around civil-military relations, slavery (which had only recently been outlawed officially in Mauritania but was still widespread in the country), other human rights abuses the opposition accused the government of perpetrating, and economic issues.

The protests began after the self-immolation of Mohamed Bouazizi and continued in what would come to be known as the February 25th Movement. Other protests, such as those against the census and student movements calling for Aziz's resignation, continued throughout 2011 and into 2012. As in other countries impacted by the Arab Spring, protestors used social media to coordinate and publicize demonstrations. The reaction of Mauritanian authorities to these protests varied, oscillating between explicit approval, ambivalence, and violent repression.

== Background ==
=== Political Climate in Mauritania ===
Following the 2008 Coup d'état in Mauritania led by then-General Mohamed Ould Abdel Aziz that deposed the democratically elected president, Sidi Ould Cheikh Abdallahi, General Aziz established military rule in the country under the High Council of State, with himself as the Council's president. Adhering to the council's pledge to hold elections in the "shortest possible period" General Aziz resigned from the High Council of State on April 15, 2009, in order to run for office in elections that were held on July 18, 2009.

Aziz won election to the presidency with 52.58% of the vote and was sworn into office on August 5, 2009. Under Aziz's presidency, Mauritania saw notable increases in individual rights and freedoms that ranked among the best in the Arab world, despite the persistence of various economic and social issues, such as high levels of corruption, lack of adequate and appropriate employment opportunities (among young adults and highly educated individuals, respectively), and inadequate standards of living, especially in the capital city of Nouakchott, with almost 20 percent of the population living on less than $1.25 per day.

== Timeline ==
=== Start of protests ===
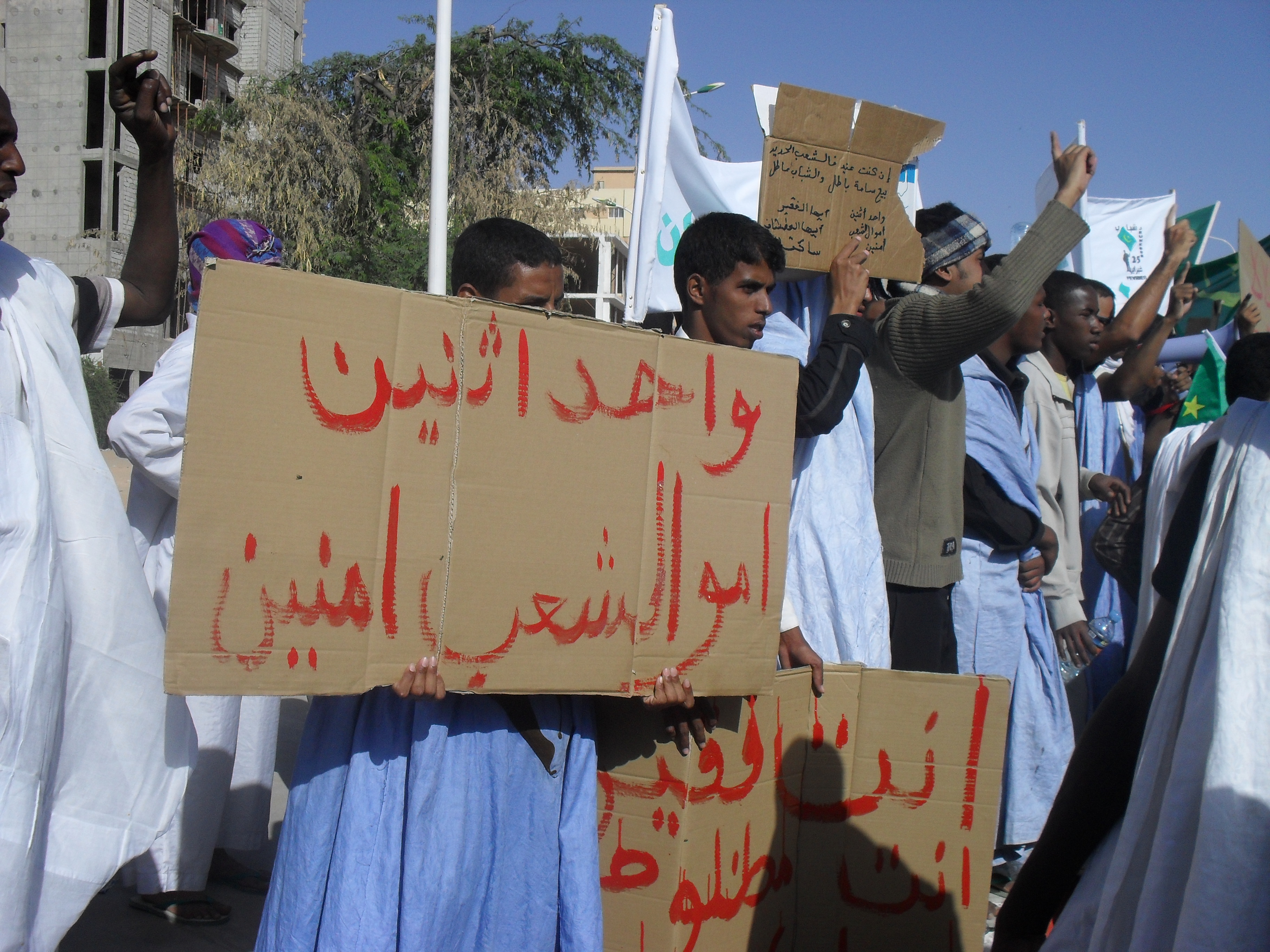
Demonstrators outside parliament in Nouakchott on 18 March 2011.

Following the example of Mohamed Bouazizi, a Tunisian fruit vendor who set himself on fire the previous month to protest the government of Tunisia, a middle-aged businessman named Yacoub Ould Dahoud burned himself in front of the Presidential Palace in Nouakchott on January 17, 2011. He left behind a note explaining that injustice in Mauritania led him to commit suicide in this way. Dahoud died on January 23 in the hospital. His self-immolation set off a round of protests in the capital starting on January 20, when protesters gathered in Place 1 Mai to declare their intent to peacefully assemble as an act of civil disobedience until the government recognized their demands.

=== Protests of the February 25th Movement ===
Following a decrease in protest activity in late January and early February, protests against the regime increased dramatically in mid-late February as university students and other young people joined in a coalition that used Facebook, Twitter, and other social media sites to call for protests in the city center of Nouakchott. The coalition specifically called for protests on February 25 at the symbolic Place d'Bloques in Nouakchott, a historically and symbolically important landmark where the first official buildings in the capital city were built in the 1950s and 1960s. President Aziz's administration had also recently announced that the government planned to sell the Place d'Bloques (which many considered to be a national symbol) to private investors at auction, a decision that the protestors viewed as the embodiment of government corruption in Mauritania and led to their calls for a reversal of the administration's decision and preservation of the Place d'Bloques.

This coalition and calls for protest, which would come to be known as the February 25th Movement, began on February 25, 2011, when protesters across Mauritania assembled a list of seven core reforms that they demanded the government institute, touching on areas ranging from civil-military relations to combating slavery and decreasing corruption. Given Mauritania's history of coups (most recently in 2005 and 2008), the protesters' top demand centered around the role of the military in politics and called for the complete withdrawal of the military from politics. The protest movement spread quickly outside the capital to cities such as Aleg, Aoujeft, Atar, and Zouerate, although street protests in the capital of Nouakchott rarely attracted more than a few hundred to a few thousand participants at any given time during this period.

Unlike previous protests, this movement transpired without the official participation of opposition political parties or labor unions. The reasons for the absence of this group are unclear and contested. Various political parties and unions declared that they refused to join what they considered protests with narrow social demands organized by inexperienced young people on Facebook and Twitter. At the same time, the protest leaders claimed that they did not want the participation of these groups as their involvement would have distracted from the movement's main goals and stymied progress. Other groups that did join the youth-led movement or staged concurrent protests and/or strikes included unemployed individuals, homeless residents of Nouakchott demanding plots of land to live on, temporary workers in state institutions demanding their rights, doctors, students, and professors.

==== Repression of Protests ====
Authorities initially approved of and did not repress the February 25th protests, leading the demonstrators to reduce their demands from the resignation of senior government officials to calls for reform through measures such as anti-corruption efforts. This change is best embodied by the different slogans used throughout the demonstrations with the initial slogan used by the protestors being the widely used Arab Spring slogan of "the people wants to bring down the regime (ash-shab yurid isqat an-nizam, Arabic: الشعب يريد إسقاط النظام) before changing to "the people wants to fix/reform the system" (Arabic: الشعب يريد إصلاح النظام).

Protests continued throughout March were met with increased levels of repression from police and other security forces. On March 9, 2011, police in Nouakchott forcibly dispersed approximately 200 youths associated with the February 25th Movement gathered at a peaceful protest, severely beating a number of the demonstrators in the process and leaving at least one in a coma due to the severity of his injuries. Police also arrested 30 protestors who had been present at the demonstration for "further investigation." This was, however, one of the first instances since the start of the February 25th Movement that Mauritanian security forces used violence on a large scale to repress peaceful demonstrations.

==== Renewed Protests and Increased Repression ====
Protestors again took to the streets after Friday prayers on March 12, 2011. This time, however, demonstrations that were intended to be peaceful devolved into violence as protestors threw stones at police and burned car tires. Security forces responded with tear gas and batons to disperse the demonstrators, arresting fourteen and severely beating four protestors in the process.

On March 25, the one-month anniversary of the start of the February 25th Movement and protests, youth protests marking this occasion were met with severe repression from police and other security forces, including witness reports that some students were forced by the police to eat dirt in what journalists and activists described as a new torture tactic started by the police in Nouakchott. Journalists and press officials covering the protests were not spared from the repression, although it does not appear that they were specifically targeted by the security forces. The violence against journalists and harsh repression of largely peaceful protests motivated political, human rights, and civil society organizations to denounce a resolution of the protests through force and declare that they would not stand idly by while these acts were perpetrated. Protestors also claimed that police officers were posing as journalists to capture video that was later analyzed to identify protest leaders and target them for future arrest. As a result, protestors prevented Mauritania TV from filming the protests out of fear that the footage would be used for this purpose and/or as political propaganda.

On April 25, 2011, protesters gathered again to demand the resignation of Prime Minister Moulaye Ould Mohamed Laghdaf and President Mohamed Ould Abdel Aziz. These protests against the prime minister came despite some economic concessions by authorities, including a promise by Laghdaf to create at least 17,000 new jobs, and an offer from the Interior Ministry to negotiate with an appointed representative of the youth movement. Unlike previous protests, the organizers of this demonstration intentionally attempted to bridge ethnic/racial identity and political ideologies and published videos in the lead-up to the protests featuring both Black Mauritanians and Arab Mauritanians. Organizers also used Facebook, YouTube, and other social media platforms to call for demonstrators to march to and occupy the Place d'Bloques and demand resolution of a widely-circulated list of 28 grievances and demands. Approximately 5,000 demonstrators participated in the protests, with many blockings traffic around the Place d'Bloques and the main square in Nouakchott for approximately two hours before security forces again used tear gas and batons to disperse the demonstrators, beating many protestors and arresting approximately fifteen-twenty individuals in the process. Around the same time, police shot a protestor taking part in a protest coordinated with those in Nouakchott in the northern town of Zouerate in the foot with a live round. Young men in cars also chased police and other security forces while chanting "huriya! huriya!" (Freedom! Freedom! Arabic: حرية!، حرية).

==== Responses to Protests and Their Repression ====
Although the February 25th Movement initially lacked widespread support, its popularity increased dramatically as other groups joined the movement and security forces continued to repress largely peaceful protests with violence and heavy-handed tactics. Despite their initial hesitation to support or join the protests, opposition parties, labor unions, and local politicians began to declare their support for the protestors. Several opposition members of parliament, for example, denounced the repression of the February 25th Movement's protests and threatened to physically join protestors in the streets to protect them from violence at the hands of security forces. At the same time, local politicians such as the mayor of the city of Aoujeft, Mohamed El Mokhtar Ould Ehmeyen Amar, resigned from the ruling political party to protest the violence against protestors and support their cause.

Mauritanian officials, on the other hand, were quick to downplay the importance of the protests — and especially their potential to lead to a revolution — by declaring that Mauritania had already undergone a revolution (a reference to the 2008 coup led by President Aziz) and that the demands of the protestors were already met. They cited the foundations of democracy in Mauritania, recent anti-corruption campaigns, work to raise the standard of living for Mauritanians, and increases in individual and public freedoms to support their claim that the protestors' demands (and those of the Arab Spring) were already included in Mauritania's government programs. Addressing the impact of the Arab Spring directly, officials from the Aziz regime declared that Mauritania was not Tunisia or Egypt and even claimed that these countries (and others involved in the Arab Spring) were imitating Mauritania's revolution of three years prior (the 2008 coup). Protestors and the February 25th Movement rejected these claims outright and continued to call for changes to government programs and the resignation of Aziz and his regime.

=== Protests against the census ===
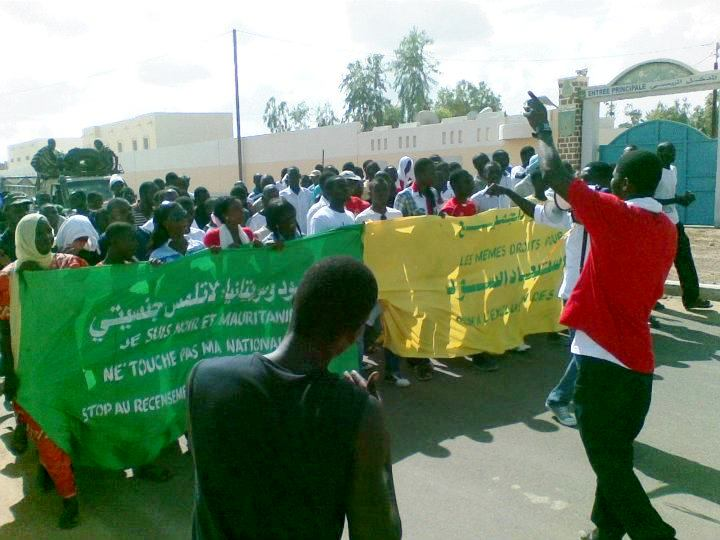
Demonstrators in Kaédi on 24 September 2011.

Hundreds of black African Mauritanians marched starting in late September 2011 to decry the government census as "racist" due to a higher standard for blacks to prove Mauritanian citizenship than Arabs. On 27 September 2011, seven black protesters were shot by police in Maghama, near the international border with Senegal, and one of them, Lamine Mangan, died from his wounds.

Days later, 56 protesters were arrested in Nouakchott. Protesters gathered in Inal in the country's north, as well as in Nouakchott, on 28 November to again rally against the census. At least one was wounded, and another was detained as security forces intervened to stop the protest in the capital city.

=== Student protests ===
Students at the Advanced Institute for Islamic Studies and Research (ISERI) began protesting on 14 December 2011. Police responded with force, firing tear gas and frequently clashing with student groups. The unrest led to the closure of ISERI, but students continued to assemble. Several were detained on 16 January 2012, only to be released by police five days later in response to public anger. On 25 January, students organized a "Day of Anger" to protest ISERI's closure.

=== Anniversary ===
To mark the one-year anniversary of Yacoub Ould Dahoud's self-immolation, protesters gathered in Nouakchott to denounce President Mohamed Ould Abdel Aziz and his government. Peaceful rally-goers held homemade signs and chanted slogans calling for reform. Several days later, on January 28, 2012, Qatar-based news network Al Jazeera ran a story on the Mauritanian protests, characterizing them as "overlooked" due in part to the relative lack of Internet penetration in Mauritania. It is estimated only 2 percent of Mauritanian households have reliable Internet connections.

=== Opposition protests ===
On April 3, thousands of people in Mauritania have attended demonstrations in the capital calling for President Mohamed Ould Abdelaziz to resign. The opposition groups held peaceful "decentralized" rallies in the nine districts of Nouakchott. Organizers said they opposed "anti-democratic" policies of the government. They accused the president of rigging elections held in 2009 which confirmed him in power and refusing to hold a serious national dialogue with opposition groups.

Protests flare up again on July 19, when thousands of Mauritanians protested in the capital late Wednesday, calling for the departure of President Mohamed Ould Abdel Aziz, whom they accuse of despotism and mismanagement. Protestors chanted "Aziz get out" and "we are sick of the tyrant" as they marched through the capital.

=== Outcomes ===
Despite continued protests and increasing outrage at the use of violent repression tactics on the part of the Aziz regime, Aziz remained in office and made few concessions to the protestors.

Scholars and analysts differ on the reasons behind this failure to overthrow or extract significant concessions from the regime, but possible explanations include internal divisions within the protest movement owing to various factions — each with different motivations, goals, and preferred tactics — failing to collaborate and coordinate action effectively, co-option of the movement by Aziz's government (e.g. Aziz's ruling party forming a youth committee in the legislature), and effective repression of protests and stifling of dissent by security forces.

== Legacy ==
Similar to protests in other countries impacted by the Arab Spring, the protest movement demonstrated the power of social media to mobilize protest, increased organization and mobilization of Mauritania's youth, and demonstrated the continued salience of ethnic identity and ethnic divisions despite repeated attempts to bridge this divide, especially in the multi-ethnic Mauritania where sharp divisions exist between Black and Arab Mauritanians. The February 25th Movement and subsequent protests also resulted in increased repression of protests and greater stifling of dissent that continued even after the departure of Aziz from office in August 2019 and the ascension of Mohamed Ould Ghazouani to the presidency — Mauritania's first peaceful transfer of power since Mauritania's independence in 1960.
