= List of ambassadors of Mauritania to Germany =

Coordinates: 52.509861°N 13.400829°E

Ambassador of Mauritania to the Germany
- Incumbent; Mohamed Mahmoud Ould Brahim Khlil since July 3, 2014
- Inaugural holder: Mamadou Touré
- Formation: September 3, 1962

The Mauritanian ambassador in Berlin is the official representative of the Government in Nouakchott to the Government of Germany.

== List of representatives ==
| Diplomatic agrément/Diplomatic accreditation | Ambassador | Observations | List of prime ministers of Mauritania | List of chancellors of Germany | Term end |
|---|---|---|---|---|---|
| September 3, 1962 | Mamadou Touré | | Moktar Ould Daddah | Konrad Adenauer | September 5, 1970 |
| July 22, 1970 | Ely Ould Allaf | | Moktar Ould Daddah | Willy Brandt | February 26, 1973 |
| April 11, 1973 | Mohamed Ould Cheikh Sidiya | | Moktar Ould Daddah | Helmut Schmidt | April 2, 1976 |
| June 14, 1976 | Taki Ould Sidi | | Moktar Ould Daddah | Helmut Schmidt | September 13, 1978 |
| December 5, 1978 | M'Bareck Ould Bouna Moctar | | Moktar Ould Daddah | Helmut Schmidt | March 7, 1980 |
| June 9, 1980 | Ely Ould Allaf | | Mohamed Khouna Ould Haidalla | Helmut Schmidt | September 23, 1982 |
| February 24, 1983 | Nalla Oumar Kane | | Maaouya Ould Sid'Ahmed Taya | Helmut Kohl | July 21, 1987 |
| October 8, 1987 | Youssouf Diagana | | Maaouya Ould Sid'Ahmed Taya | Helmut Kohl | August 26, 1994 |
| October 31, 1994 | Mohamedou Ould Mohamed Mahmoud | | Sidi Mohamed Ould Boubacar | Helmut Kohl | December 1, 1995 |
| April 23, 1996 | Hamoud Ould Ely | | Cheikh El Avia Ould Mohamed Khouna | Helmut Kohl | February 16, 2001 |
| July 1, 2001 | Melaïnine Ould Moctar Nèche | | Cheikh El Avia Ould Mohamed Khouna | Gerhard Schröder | July 3, 2005 |
| August 24, 2005 | Mamadou Diakité (Mauritanian diplomat) | | Sidi Mohamed Ould Boubacar | Angela Merkel | August 8, 2010 |
| September 7, 2010 | Moussa Diagana | | Moulaye Ould Mohamed Laghdhaf | Angela Merkel | June 16, 2011 |
| September 2, 2011 | Bebbe Ould Mohamed M'Bareck | | Moulaye Ould Mohamed Laghdhaf | Angela Merkel | May 9, 2014 |
| July 3, 2014 | Mohamed Mahmoud Ould Brahim Khlil | | Yahya Ould Hademine | Angela Merkel | |
