= Mauritania–Russia relations =

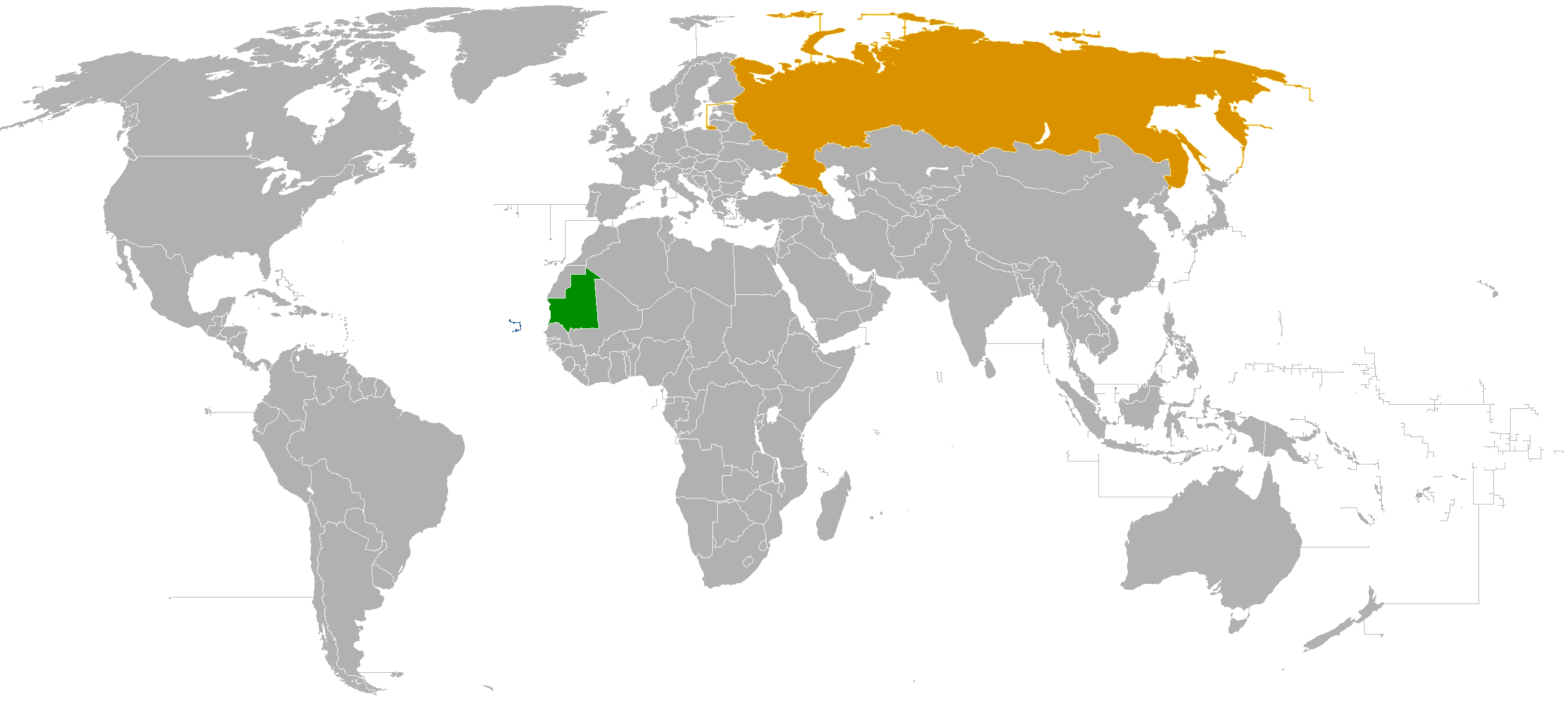
- Mauritania: Russia

Mauritania–Russia relations (Russian: Российско-мавританские отношения) are the bilateral foreign relations between the Russian Federation and Mauritania.

== Background ==
=== Soviet-era relations ===
Upon gaining independence from France in 1960, Mauritania applied for membership of the United Nations, but saw its application fail due to the Soviet Union using its veto in the Security Council. Deputy Minister of Foreign Affairs Valerian Zorin accused the United States and its allies of sabotaging the admission of Mongolia into the General Assembly for fourteen years, and based upon Soviet friendship with the Arab states, the admission of Mauritania was halted. In return for a favourable vote on Mongolia's admission to the United Nations, the Soviet Union dropped its objections to Mauritanian entry into the international body, and Mauritania joined the United Nations on 27 October 1961.

The Soviet Union and Mauritania established diplomatic relations on 12 July 1964. On 17 October 1966, the two countries signed a trade agreement.

On 20 February 1973, the two countries signed an agreement on co-operation in the field of fisheries in Moscow, and a further treaty was signed in Nouakchott on 31 January 1981. The waters off the 754 kilometres (469 mi) long coast of Mauritania are among the richest fishing grounds in the world, and in 1979 Mauritania initiated its New Fisheries Policy and established a 200-nautical-mile (370 km) Exclusive Economic Zone. The New Fisheries Policy had three objectives: the formation of Mauritanian-controlled joint ventures, the creation of a national fishing fleet, and the establishment of a Mauritanian-controlled fish processing industry at Nouadhibou. The first of these objectives led to the replacement of licensing and royalties agreements with foreign operators by newly formed Mauritanian-controlled joint ventures. In principle, such joint ventures implied a 43 percent government share, an 8 percent local private sector share, and a 49 percent foreign share. In practice, Mauritanian control of these ventures was nominal. The foreign partner provided all the capital and equipment and controlled all operations. Government and private shares were to be purchased out of venture profits over periods as long as twenty years. By 1986 the most important of the joint venture agreements that had been established was the Mauritanian-Soviet Maritime Resources Company (Mauritanienne-Soviétique des Ressources Maritimes—MAUSSOV). Between 1985 and 1987, MAUSSOV accounted for about 55 percent of total export tonnage and 20 to 30 percent of the total value of fish exports.

== Russian Federation relations ==
=== Diplomatic ties ===
Russia has an embassy in Nouakchott, and Mauritania has an embassy in Moscow. The current ambassador of Russia to Mauritania is Vladimir Baybakov, who was appointed by Russian president Dmitry Medvedev on 17 August 2008. The current ambassador of Mauritania to Russia is Boulah Ould Mogueye, who presented his credentials to Russian president Vladimir Putin on 11 December 2007.

=== Political ties ===
The 2005 coup d'état which saw the ouster of Mauritanian president Maaouya Ould Sid'Ahmed Taya whilst he was outside of the country, and his replacement by the Military Council for Justice and Democracy was condemned by Russia. Russia welcomed the reforms by the military of Mauritania, and the presidential elections in 2007 which saw the installation of Sidi Ould Cheikh Abdallahi. Following the coup d'état on 6 August 2008 in Mauritania, the Russian Ministry of Foreign Affairs condemned the overthrow of Mauritanian president Sidi Ould Cheikh Abdallahi, and took an active part in negotiations conducted in Dakar by the International Contact Group for Mauritania. It welcomed the 4 June 2009 signing of a framework agreement between opposing Mauritanian sides, and the holding of the presidential election on 18 July 2009.

=== Economic ties ===
In February 2023, Russia's foreign minister Sergey Lavrov met Mauritanian officials including President Mohamed Ould Ghazouani and Foreign Minister Mohamed Salem Ould Merzoug to discuss bilateral cooperation and Mauritania's interest in supplies of hydrocarbon fuel, food and fertilizers from Russia.
