= February 25th Movement =

Political movement in Mauritania

February 25 Movement
- Founded: February 2011
- Founder: Anonymous activists
- Type: Pressure group Political group
- Purpose: Democracy; Social justice Free and fair election Nonviolence
- Region served: Mauritania
- Method: Civil resistance
- Website: Homepage

The February 25th Movement is a Mauritanian youth group, named after the date of the beginning of Mauritania's protests, and led by anonymous individuals who organise protests chiefly via new-media sites. The group also tries to attract members through more direct means, such as by distributing leaflets and posters.

== History ==
The first opposition structure to emerge was the February 25 Coordinating Body, but this group fell apart due to internal tensions and disagreements, in part brought on by a desire of some members of the group to enter into dialogue with the government of President Aziz. This was condemned by the majority of the group's membership, who saw the move as a betrayal of the still relatively young opposition movement. Following the group's dissolution, a new group was formed under the title of the 25 February Youth Coalition. This group was successfully able to attract a large amount of support amongst the Mauritanian youth. Following government repression against the group, a new group named the February 25th Movement was formed.

== Demands ==
The movement has also published a list of 28 grievances, including both political and economic problems. The group's demands include; the removal of the military from Mauritanian politics, the elimination of institutional racism, better rights for women, reformation of the country's education system, an end to the endemic corruption within government, the strengthening of Mauritanian civil society, and revamping Mauritania's foreign policy so that it better represents the interests of its citizens.

== Relationships with other opposition groups ==
The movement has attempted to link up with other Mauritanian protest movements including the Coordination of the Democratic Opposition, the Don’t Touch my Nationality movement, and IRA-Mauritania.

== Criticisms ==
The group has been criticized due to its lack of diversity, with most of the group's members and activists being Arabs, and therefore unrepresentative of wider Mauritanian society which is composed of Arabs, Afro-Arabs, and Blacks.
