= Biram Dah Abeid =

Mauritanian politician and activist (born 1965)

- بيرام ولد الداه ولد اعبيدي
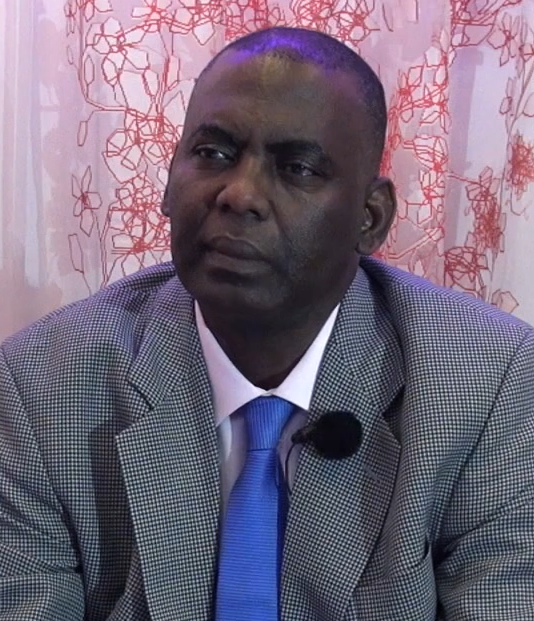
- Abeid in 2019

Deputy of the National Assembly
- Incumbent
- Assumed office 8 October 2018
- Parliamentary group: Non-attached (Sep. 2023–present) Former: Sawab-APP (Jun. 2020–Sep. 2023); Non-attached (Oct. 2018–Jun. 2020)
- Constituency: National list

Personal details
- Born: Biram Ould Dah Ould Abeid; 12 January 1965 (age 61) Jidr el-Mouhguen, Trarza, Mauritania
- Party: RAG
- Other political affiliations: Sawab–RAG
- Occupation: Politician

Biram Ould Dah Ould Abeid (Note: Arabic: بيرام ولد الداه ولد اعبيدي) (born 12 January 1965) is a Mauritanian politician and advocate for the abolition of slavery. He was listed by Time magazine as one of the "100 Most Influential People" in 2017 and was called the "Mauritanian Nelson Mandela" by online news organisation Middle East Eye.

A leader of the international anti-slavery movement, Abeid has been arrested and imprisoned several times by Mauritanian authorities. His case has been taken up by Irwin Cotler and the Raoul Wallenberg Centre for Human Rights.

== Early life ==
Biram was born in 1965 in Jidr el-Mouhguen, a town near Rosso, Trarza.

As Abeid grew up, he attended high school in the city of Rosso in 1979, where the social inequalities, also present in his native village, were more prominent. He became more aware of how the caste system, which separated the black masses from the other tribes, denied the marginalised communities access to education and employment, and further impeded their ability to ever gain independence.

When he was 19 years old, Abeid started a movement called National African Movement, to fight discrimination, and often advocated against the mistreatment of black people by writing open letters to the Secretary of State. At the age of 28, he had to interrupt his studies due to financial struggles and ended up participating in municipal elections during this time. However, after three years, he decided to return to school and went on to obtain a master's degree in history. He then trained as a lawyer in Mauritania and in Senegal.

== Life as an activist and politician ==
It was in the year 2007 that Zeine Ould Zeidane, former presidential candidate, offered Abeid work on his political program, advocating for the abolition of slavery and against discrimination. Abeid accepted the offer and in the same year, following a hunger strike held together with three other activists, Mauritanian government officials arrested three women accused of holding children in slavery in the capital, Nouakchott. This was the first time in Mauritania that someone was charged with the crime of slavery since the practice was criminalised by law in 2007.

Later in 2008, Abeid founded the Initiative for the Resurgence of the Abolitionist Movement (IRA-Mauritania), which he defines as "an organization of popular struggle", and where he serves as president. Abeid sees his abolitionist mission as making slaves—who are isolated by illiteracy, poverty, and geography—aware of the possibility of a life outside servitude. He believes that slaves are tied to their masters not only by tradition and economic necessity but also by "a misinterpretation of Islam" that teaches that slavery is not illegal but governed by religious law.

He argues that:

there is a kind of informal coalition—Beydanes [the slave-owning caste], the state, police, judges, and imams—that prevents slaves from leaving their masters. "Whenever a slave breaks free and IRA [his antislavery group] is not aware and not present, police officers and judges help Arab Berbers to intimidate the slave until he returns in submission."

In 2010, Abeid was discharged from his duties as a Senior Adviser to the President of the National Commission for Human Rights in Mauritania for continuously voicing slavery issues. He was also threatened with prosecution and imprisonment for "illegal activities" if he did not suspend his active role in the fight against slavery.

He was also arrested, detained, and tortured in December 2010 during a dispute between the police and his group, when about eighty of his activists descended on the house of an owner of two slave girls, demanding that the owner be jailed. Abeid told the police that "we would not leave until you free the girls and put these criminals in jail."

On 6 January 2011, along with two other activists, Abeid was sentenced to twelve months in prison. He was imprisoned in February 2011 and then pardoned by Mauritanian President Mohamed Ould Abdel Aziz.

Later, in August 2011, the Mauritanian police violently suppressed a sit-in in front of the police brigade over their 'employment of minors against the law'. Abeid and ten other IRA activists were injured and hospitalised in the Kissi clinic in Nouakchott.

In April 2012, during a demonstration in Nouakchott, Abeid's group was accused of burning early Islamic legal texts of the Maliki school of Islamic law that permitted slavery. The burnings caused a considerable uproar. The president called for Abeid's death and even promised to administer the penalty. Abeid's phone and internet service were cut off, and he was imprisoned with other IRA activists. Later, the NGO apologised for the incident. After several months of detention and the cancellation of their trial, the group was released on bail on 3 September 2012, following pressure from the international community.

In May 2013, Biram Dah Abeid received the Front Line Award for Human Rights Defenders at Risk from the Irish NGO Front Line Defenders, and in December 2013, he received the United Nations Prize in the Field of Human Rights.

He also stood as an opposition candidate in the 2014 Mauritanian presidential election, but lost to the incumbent, Abdel Aziz.

On 11 November 2014, Abeid and sixteen other IRA-Mauritania anti-slavery activists were arrested for protesting against the repeal of charges against a slave master who raped a 15-year-old girl that worked as his slave.

Hearings of the case took place on 15 January 2015, when Abeid, along with two other activists, was sentenced to two years in jail. An appeal was rejected in August 2015.

On 17 May 2016, the Supreme Court of Mauritania reached the decision to immediately release Abeid, along with fellow activist Brahim Bilal Ramdhan.

In August 2018, Abeid was imprisoned on an "order from above", considered by many to be an attempt to prohibit his participation in the September parliamentary elections, in which he was running as an anti-slavery, opposition candidate. Despite the efforts of the Mauritanian authorities, Abeid was elected to Parliament from his prison cell in September. Following his illegal detention and ascension to Parliament, he proclaimed: "I will do everything possible to demonstrate that slavery, racism and torture are set up as a system of management by a small entity around a very corrupt head of state." Abeid has since declared himself a presidential candidate in the June 2019 elections. On 22 June 2019, he clinched 18.58% electoral votes, behind Mohamed Ould Ghazouani (52.01%) and ahead of Sidi Mohamed Ould Boubacar (17.87%).

== Awards and recognition ==
- 2013 – Front Line award for Human Rights Defenders at Risk from Front Line Defenders
- 2013 – United Nations Prize in the Field of Human Rights
- 2017 – Prix Mémoires partagées, from Mémoires et Partages
- 2019 – Honorary doctorate at the University of Leuven (KU Leuven)

== Electoral history ==
Electoral history of Biram Dah Abeid
| Election | List | Constituency | Votes | % | Position | Result |
|---|---|---|---|---|---|---|
| 2014 Mauritanian presidential election | RAG | —N/a | 61,218 | 8.67% | 2nd (out of 5) | Lost |
| 2018 Mauritanian parliamentary election | Sawab–RAG | National list | 12,265 | 1.75% | 11th (out of 97) | Elected |
| 2019 Mauritanian presidential election | Sawab–RAG | —N/a | 172,649 | 18.59% | 2nd (out of 6) | Lost |
| 2023 Mauritanian parliamentary election | Sawab–RAG | National list | 39,807 | 4.10% | 4th (out of 25) | Elected |
| 2024 Mauritanian presidential election | Sawab–RAG | —N/a | 218,427 | 22.10% | 2nd (out of 7) | Lost |

== See also ==
- Abolition of slavery timeline
