= Germany–Mauritania relations =

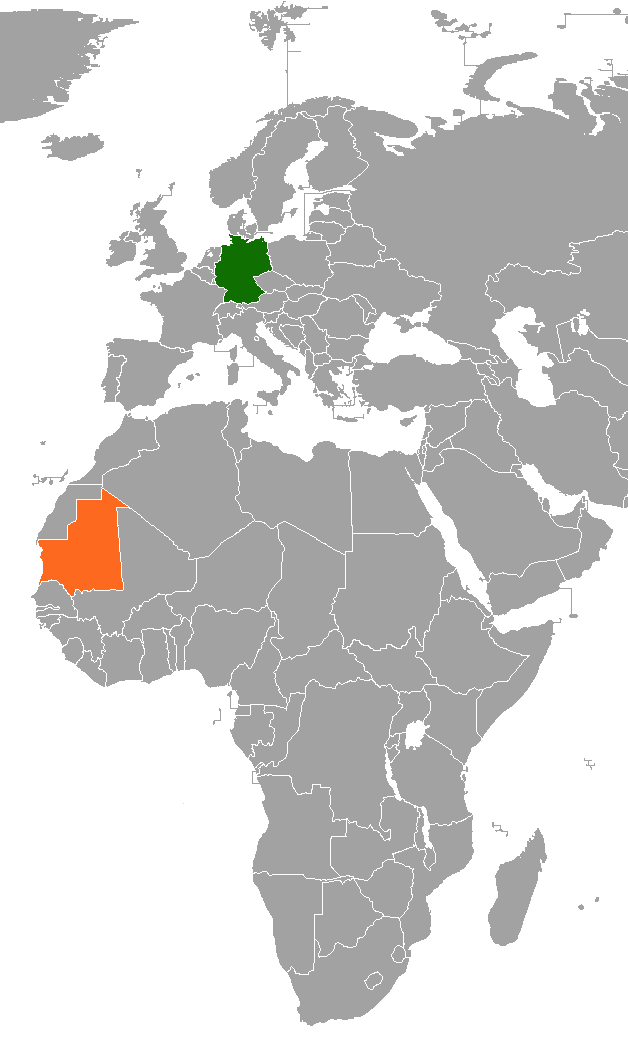

- Germany: Mauritania

Germany–Mauritania relations are described as "good" by the German Foreign Office, and Germany provides development aid to Mauritania. However, state visits at the bilateral level are rare.

== History ==
The Captain Cornelius Reers of the frigate Rother Löwe from the Electorate of Brandenburg occupied the island of Arguin in 1685. Brandenburg concluded a treaty of protection with the local king of Arguin two years later. The island remained in Brandenburg's possession until 1721, when it finally had to be abandoned after French attacks.

After Mauritania's independence from France in 1960, the country established diplomatic relations with the Federal Republic of Germany (FRG) in the same year. Following the end of the Hallstein Doctrine, Mauritania also established diplomatic relations with the German Democratic Republic (GDR) until German reunification.

In 1991, the German Society for International Cooperation opened an office in Nouakchott. Following a coup in the country in 2008, development cooperation was temporarily suspended by Germany. In 2016, Development Minister Gerd Müller visited the country, and three years later a German Bundestag delegation paid a visit to the country.

== Economic relations ==
The economic relations are of low intensity. The total volume of trade with Mauritania amounted to 171 million Euro in 2021, placing Mauritania 124th in the ranking of Germany's trading partners. Germany imports mainly raw materials from Mauritania and exports food, vehicles, and machinery in return. Since 2018, MAN has maintained a workshop in Nouakchott. All imports from Mauritania to Germany are duty-free and quota-free, with the exception of armaments, as part of the Everything but Arms initiative of the European Union.

== Development cooperation ==
Germany provides development aid in Mauritania with a focus on peace and security, vocational training and the environment. In addition to the bilateral level, it is also active at the multilateral level, including in the regional organizations G5 Sahel and the Sahel Alliance. KfW and German Society for International Cooperation are represented in Mauritania.

== Diplomatic missions ==
- Germany has an embassy in Nouakchott.
- Mauritania has an embassy in Berlin.

== See also ==
- Foreign relations of Germany
- Foreign relations of Mauritania
- List of ambassadors of Mauritania to Germany
