= Abdallahi Matallah Saleck =

Mauritanian anti-slavery activist

Abdallahi Matallah Saleck (Arabic: عبد الله مط الله سيك), also spelled as Abdellahi Matalla Saleck, is a Mauritanian human rights activist and anti-slavery campaigner who rose to prominence as a member of the Initiative for the Resurgence of the Abolitionist Movement. He served 743 days in prison between 2016 and 2018 due to his activism after being arrested at a protest in Nouakchott.

== Activism ==
Saleck was a member of the Initiative for the Resurgence of the Abolitionist Movement (IRA), which campaigned against racism, slavery and gender oppression in Mauritania. The IRA had not been officially recognised as an organisation since its founding in 2008, leading to its members frequently being arrested on charges of being part of an unrecognised organisation. Matallah Saleck led the IRA branch in Sebkha. He frequently spoke out publicly against slave owners making threats against their slaves to coerce them into lying about their enslavement, and also commented on a widespread system of tip-offs across Mauritania that allowed slave owners to conceal evidence of their crimes. He lived in Nouakchott.

== Arrest and imprisonment ==
On 29 June 2016 Matallah Saleck, alongside fellow anti-slavery activist Moussa Biram, were arrested after taking part in a protest against the forced eviction of Haratin people in the Gazra Bouamoutou shanty town in Nouakchott. Over the following month, 13 members of the IRA were arrested by government authorities.

On the night of 11 June into 12 June, the IRA activists were presented to the public prosecutor of Nouakchott. Lawyers requested medical assistance for Matallah Saleck and Biram, who were reported to show signs of torture, and also called for the independent National Mechanism for the Prevention of Torture to visit Dar Naim Prison, where the activists were being detained. These requests were denied by the public prosecutor. On 28 September 2016, Matallah Saleck was transferred to a prison in Zouérat, around 700 kilometres from Nouakchott.

The human rights organisation Alkarama called for Matallah Saleck and his fellow IRA activists to be immediately released from detainment, and called on the Mauritanian government to stop its persecution of human rights activists.

On 18 August 2016, Matallah Saleck and Biram were sentenced to 15 years in prison, with one year suspended, for "incitement of riots and violent rebellion against the government". On 18 November, an appeal hearing held at the Court of Appeal in Zouérat reduced Matallah Saleck's sentence to three years in prison, with one year suspended. In December, they were transferred to a prison in Bir Moghrein, 1200 kilometres from Nouakchott ordinarily used to hold death row prisoners.

On 28 June 2018, Amnesty International called on the African Union not to ignore Mauritania's human rights record during its Heads of State Summit held in the Mauritanian capital, Nouakchott. They specifically called on the President of Mauritania, Mohamed Ould Abdel Aziz, to release Matallah Saleck and Biram, raising concerns that the men had been tortured whilst in detention, and that the charges against them had been trumped up due to their prominent anti-slavery activism. A government spokesperson dismissed claims that Matallah Saleck had been tortured, stating that the National Mechanism for the Prevention of Torture had visited the prison in 2017 and had not identified any human rights violations taking place.

== Release ==
Matallah Saleck and Biram were released from prison on 12 July 2018 after serving 743 days. Less than a week later, both men were reported to have returned to Nouakchott and resumed public campaigning for the IRA. Matallah continued to be subject to a suspended prison sentence until 2019.
