= Military Hospital (Nouakchott) =

- Directorate-General of the Armed Forces Health and Security Service

Geography
- Location: northeastern Nouakchott, Mauritania
- Coordinates: 18°6′34″N 15°57′10″W

Organisation
- Type: Military hospital

Services
- Beds: 100

Links
- Lists: Hospitals in Mauritania

The Military Hospital is a hospital in northeastern Nouakchott, Mauritania. It is located to the northeast of the Ophthalmological Hospital.

== History ==
In 2011, the Directorate-General of the Armed Forces Health and Security Service was created. The military hospital reports to this Directorate-General. It has around 100 beds at the hospital.

In October 2012 Mohamed Ould Abdel Aziz, Mauritania's president, spent eight hours in this hospital. He had been operated upon by two doctors after being shot by government troops in what was said to be an accident. He was flown to France for further treatment after his stay in the hospital.

== Departments ==
- Department of Urology
- Department cardiology
- Department of general medicine and internal medicine
- Otolaryngology
- Emergency and intensive care unit.
- medical laboratory
- Medical imaging and Radiology

== CMD ==
The chief medical director of the hospital is Pharmacist-Colonel Abdel Malek Mohamed Abdel Malek.
