= Warda Ahmed Souleimane =

Mauritanian human rights activist

- وردة أحمد سليمان
- Citizenship: Mauritania
- Occupation: Human rights activist
- Organization: Initiative for the Resurgence of the Abolitionist Movement
- Criminal charges: Inciting the population to overthrow the regime
- Criminal status: Pre-trial detention

Warda Ahmed Souleimane (Arabic: وردة أحمد سليمان) is a Mauritanian human rights activist and blogger. She is known for her anti-slavery campaigning, in addition to her work against racial discrimination and social exclusion in Mauritania. Souleimane is a member of the Initiative for the Resurgence of the Abolitionist Movement.

== Activism ==
Souleimane has been described as a prominent member of Mauritania's abolitionist movement, and is a member of the media team of the Initiative for the Resurgence of the Abolitionist Movement (IRA), an anti-slavery group that campaigns against slavery, racial discrimination and social exclusion, advocating for equality and for an end to caste-based discrimination and racial hierarchies within Mauritanian society.

Souleimane was detained between 1 and 17 April 2025 following a criminal complaint made against her by businessman and Equity Party activist Khatri Ould Dje, who had accused her of defamation and slander after she had criticised his support of the government on social media. Souleimane had refused to comply with a court order that required her to register daily with local authorities and refrain from using social media during the investigation into Dje's complaint, which led to her being arrested and detained at a women's prison in Arafat, Nouakchott-Sud. The IRA described Souleimane's detention as "arbitrary" and accused Dje of making defamatory statements against the IRA. On 17 April, Souleimane was released from prison without charge following a court appearance in Nouakchott.

In May 2025, Souleimane was among a group of activists who took part in a sit-in protest in solidarity with a sibling group who were in a dispute with authorities over land rights in Teyarett, Nouakchott-Nord. Souleimane was one of 18 activists detained during the protest, receiving injuries to her hand during her arrest.

On 31 October 2025, Souleimane was arrested in Nouakchott by unidentified police officers; at the time of her arrest, no details were shared by authorities about why she had been arrested or where she had been taken. Media reports suggested that the arrest was linked to a post she had made on Facebook calling for the peaceful mobilisation against systemic discrimination from local authorities against Mauritania. The arrest also took place days after she returned to the country from the Gambia, where she had participated in a side event of the 85th Ordinary Session of the African Commission on Human and Peoples' Rights, in which she had described the system in Mauritania as "apartheid à la mauritanienne" that limited access to opportunities based on descent and social status, during a talk on racial discrimination. Following her return to Mauritania, Souleimane had been subjected to a smear campaign on social media by government-organised non-governmental organisations.

Souleimane's whereabouts were confirmed following a court appearance on 5 November at the regional court of Nouakchott-Ouest where she was charged with "inciting the population to overthrow the regime" and stated to have been held at the headquarters of the Cybercrime Unit. During a court hearing in which she did not have legal representation, Souleimane acknowledged having written the Facebook post, but denied that it had called for violence and stated it was within her rights to freedom of impression. The prosecutor requested that Souleimane be held in pre-trial detention.

Front Line Defenders stated that Souleimane's detention was linked to her "peaceful and legitimate work defending human rights and denouncing racial discrimination" in Mauritania and called for her immediate and unconditional release. The African Commission on Human and Peoples' Rights expressed its concern about Souleimane's arrest, which they linked to her attendance at its 85th Ordinary Session, and called on Mauritanian authorities to take "all necessary measures" for her release should no charges be brought against her.

On 6 November 2025, Souleimane was released after appearing at Nouakchott West Court and was placed under judicial supervision.
