= Mohamed Lemine Ould Guig =

Mauritanian academic and political figure

- محمد الأمين ولد جيج

8th Prime Minister of Mauritania
- In office 18 December 1997 – 16 November 1998
- President: Maaouya Ould Sid'Ahmed Taya
- Preceded by: Cheikh El Avia Ould Mohamed Khouna
- Succeeded by: Cheikh El Avia Ould Mohamed Khouna

Personal details
- Born: July 1, 1959 (age 67) Oualata, French Mauritania
- Party: Republican Party for Democracy and Renewal (PRDS)

Mohamed Lemine Ould Guig (Arabic: محمد الأمين ولد جيج; born July 1, 1959) is a Mauritanian academic and political figure. He was the 8th Prime Minister of Mauritania from December 18, 1997, to November 16, 1998 (11 months).

Guig was the Prime Minister between stints by Cheikh El Avia Ould Mohamed Khouna.

== Biography ==
Guig was a native of Oualata and trained as an attorney. He was a law professor at the University of Nouakchott in the 1990s but was generally unknown in political circles. Guig served as director of higher education, and his region was considered a bastion of the presidential majority (PRDS).

On December 18, 1997, he was appointed prime minister by President Maaouya Ould Sid'Ahmed Taya shortly after his re-election in the 1997 presidential election. Guig replaced the civil servant Cheikh El Avia Ould Mohamed Khouna. At the time of his appointment, Guig was 39 years old and the youngest Prime Minister of the world. Serving 11 months, Taya dismissed him as premier on November 16, 1998, and Khouna assumed his position. In 2003, Guig was appointed Commissioner for Food Security, to replace Sidi Mohamed Ould Biye.

Following the 2008 coup d'état, Guig was appointed secretary-general by coup leader Mohamed Ould Abdel Aziz. In 2014, Guig was appointed Chairman of the Commission of the African Union to supervise the 2014 Egyptian presidential election, which resulted in the election of former General Abdel Fattah el-Sisi. On January 9, 2015, Guig was appointed State Inspector General and pledged to fight against mismanagement and misappropriation of public property. In June 2015 however, Guig was appointed Deputy General Secretary of the Arab League to manage financial affairs.

== Notes ==
Political offices
Preceded by Cheikh El Avia Ould Mohamed Khouna	Prime Minister of Mauritania; 1997–1998	Succeeded by Cheikh El Avia Ould Mohamed Khouna
