= Rosso (department) =

Rosso روصو
- Department
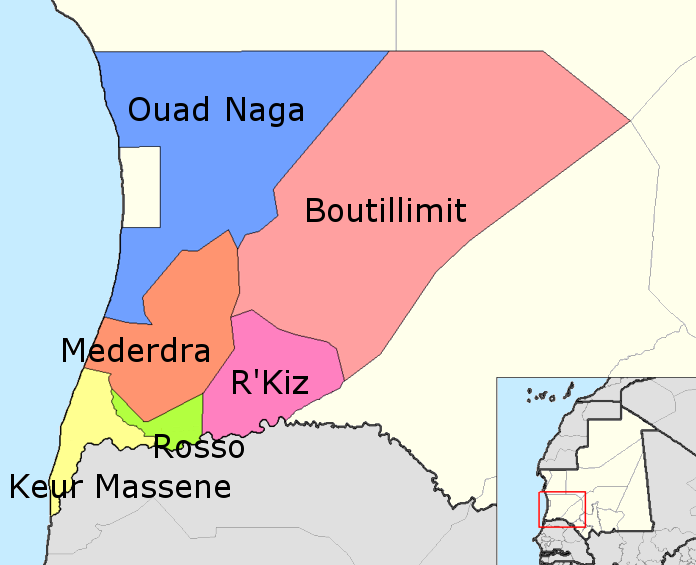

- Location within Mauritania
- Country: Mauritania

Area
  - Total: 1,410 km^{2} (540 sq mi)

Population (2013 census)
  - Total: 57,726
  - Density: 40.9/km^{2} (106/sq mi)

Rosso is a department of Trarza Region in Mauritania.

== List of municipalities in the department ==
The Rosso department is made up of the following communes:

- Jidr-El Mouhguen
- Rosso
