= Yahya Ould Ahmed El Waghef =

Prime Minister of Mauritania in 2008

- يحيى ولد أحمد الواقف
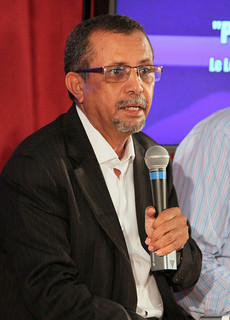
- Waghef in 2012

11th Prime Minister of Mauritania
- In office 6 May 2008 – 6 August 2008
- President: Sidi Ould Cheikh Abdallahi
- Preceded by: Zeine Ould Zeidane
- Succeeded by: Moulaye Ould Mohamed Laghdaf

Personal details
- Born: 30 June 1960 (age 66) Moudjéria, Mauritania
- Party: National Pact for Democracy and Development (ADIL)

Yahya Ould Ahmed El Waghef (Arabic: يحيى ولد أحمد الواقف; born 1960) is a Mauritanian politician. He was appointed as Prime Minister of Mauritania on 6 May 2008, serving until the August 2008 coup d'état. Yahya is also President of the National Pact for Democracy and Development (ADIL), and he was Secretary-General of the Presidency from 2007 to 2008.

== Biography ==
Yahya was born in Moudjéria, Mauritania. He was Director-General of the Mauritanian Gas Company (Societé Mauritanienne de Gaz, SOMAGAZ) from January 2003 to August 2003 and then Director of the Banc d'Arguin National Park from September 2003 until he was appointed as Secretary-General of the Ministry of Hydraulics and Energy on 27 October 2004. He served in that capacity until April 2005, at which point he became Director-General of Air Mauritanie, remaining in that post until December 2006. In February 2007, he became Advisor to the Minister of Finance.

After President Sidi Mohamed Ould Cheikh Abdallahi took office in April 2007, he appointed Yahya as Secretary-General of the Presidency, with the rank of minister, on 28 April 2007. On 5 January 2008, Yahya was elected as President of ADIL, a political party that was formed to support Sidi Mohamed, at the end of the party's constitutive congress.

Prime Minister Zeine Ould Zeidane resigned on 6 May 2008, and Sidi Mohamed appointed Yahya to succeed him on the same day. Following consultations with majority and opposition parties regarding the formation of the new government, the opposition Union of the Forces of Progress (UFP) announced on 9 May that it intended to participate in Yahya's government; the opposition National Rally for Reform and Development (Tewassoul) also announced that it had decided to participate in the government on 10 May. However, the President of the Rally of Democratic Forces (RFD), Ahmed Ould Daddah, said on 7 May that the RFD—the main opposition party—would not participate; the President of the Alliance for Justice and Democracy/Movement for Renewal, Ibrahima Moctar Sarr, also said on 10 May that his party would not participate due to policy differences.

On 11 May, Yahya's Government was named; it had 30 members, including 24 ministers, and 12 of its members had previously served under Zeidane. Members of ADIL accounted for almost two-thirds of Yahya's government and held most of the key ministries. Four members of the government were from the two opposition parties which decided to participate.

On 30 June 2008, 39 deputies in the National Assembly (out of a total of 95) filed a motion of censure against Yahya's government. Most of these deputies were from ADIL, although the RFD (the main opposition party) also declared its support for the censure motion. The deputies complained that Yahya's government had not presented a program and that too many positions in the government had been given to opposition parties and to figures who had served under President Maaouya Ould Sid'Ahmed Taya. 24 senators declared that they were in "unconditional solidarity" with the deputies who filed the censure motion.

President Sidi Mohamed, speaking on 2 July, called on the deputies to reconsider. He said that the motion was surprising because it was initiated by deputies belonging to the party that headed the government, and also because the government's program had not even been presented yet. In addition, Sidi Mohamed argued that Yahya's government was so new that there had not been enough time to properly evaluate its performance, and he warned that he might dissolve the National Assembly if the censure motion was adopted. Before the censure motion could be voted on, Yahya and his government resigned on 3 July in order "to preserve the cohesion of the majority which supports [Sidi Mohamed's] programme"; he urged unity and dialogue among ADIL and the presidential majority. Yahya was reappointed by Sidi Mohamed on the same day. The deputies who supported the censure motion described the resignation and reappointment as a positive step and said that the composition of the next government should properly reflect the results of the previous election.

Yahya said following his reappointment on 3 July that he wanted to form a government of "broad consensus". An opposition coalition composed of a dozen parties denounced Yahya's reappointment on 7 July. On 8 July, Yahya announced that no opposition parties would be included in the new government, thereby excluding the UFP and Tewassoul.

The new Government was named on 15 July; there were 30 members of this government, including 12 who were new to the government. No members of the opposition were included in this government, and the ministers associated with Taya were also excluded.

On 4 August 2008, 25 of ADIL's 49 deputies in the National Assembly, along with 24 of its 45 senators, announced that they were leaving the party, thereby depriving it of its parliamentary majority.

=== 2008 coup d'etat ===
On 6 August 2008, Yahya was arrested in a military coup d'état along with President Sidi Mohamed and the Interior minister. The coup plotters were top security forces who had been fired by Abdallahi earlier in the day; these included General Mohamed Ould Abdel Aziz, General Mohamed Ould Al-Ghazwani, General Philippe Swikri, and Brigadier General (Aqid) Ahmed Ould Bakri. Member of parliament Mohammed Al Mukhtar claimed popular support for the coup, saying that Sidi Mohamed behaved in an "authoritarian" manner and "marginalized the majority in parliament." Yahya was reportedly held at an army barracks immediately after the coup.

Yahya and three other high-ranking officials were released from custody by the military on 11 August, while Sidi Mohamed remained in custody. A few hours later, Yahya spoke before a rally of thousands of people and expressed defiance toward the junta, saying that Mauritanians did not accept its rule and urging the people to continue struggling to restore Sidi Mohamed to power.

Moulaye Ould Mohamed Laghdaf was appointed as prime minister by junta leader Mohamed on 14 August, but Yahya said at a news conference on the same day that this appointment was "illegal" and that the government he had headed was still the legitimate government.

Yahya said in an interview with Abu Dhabi TV on 20 August that President Abdallahi had dismissed the senior officers because they had already been planning to seize power on 9 August. He subsequently travelled to Nouadhibou in northern Mauritania in order to participate in an anti-coup protest there, but was arrested upon arrival on 21 August 2008. He was reportedly arrested because he left Nouakchott without the junta's permission. On 22 August, it was announced that he was being taken to his home village of Achram, where he would be kept under house arrest. According to Minister of Decentralization Yahya Ould Kebd, the junta sought to "rein in his activism", saying that "his contact with the outside will probably be limited but not banned".

In November 2008, Yahya and four others were charged with intentionally bankrupting Air Mauritanie while Yahya was its Director-General. In early December, bail for Yahya and his co-defendants was set at 100 million ouguiyas; this was reportedly the highest level of bail ever set by a court in Mauritania. Yahya was also charged with corruption in a case involving spoiled food; the bail set in that case was five million ouguiyas.

Dozens of protesters called for Yahya's release in a demonstration near the Supreme Court on 29 April 2009. The police broke up the protest. Subsequently, in negotiations between the junta and the opposition, the opposition demanded Yahya's release as a condition for an agreement. After a deal was reached, the junta finally released Yahya on 4 June 2009. He was greeted by a crowd as he emerged from the Dar Naim prison in Nouakchott.

Political offices
Preceded by Zeine Ould Zeidane	Prime Minister of Mauritania; 2008	Succeeded by Moulaye Ould Mohamed Laghdaf
Government offices
Preceded by Zeine Ould Zeidane as Prime Minister	Head of Government of Mauritania; 2008	Succeeded by Mohamed Ould Abdel Aziz as President of the High Council of State
