= Jidr el-Mouhguen =

Jidr el-Mouhguen جَدْرُ المحقن Jedr El Moubghuen
- Commune and town
- Location in Mauritania
- Country: Mauritania
- Region: Trarza
- Department: Rosso

Population (2000)
  - Total: 6,632
- Time zone: UTC+0 (GMT)

Jidr el-Mouhguen or Jedr El Moubghuen is a town and urban commune in the Trarza Region of south-western Mauritania. It is located near the Senegal River on the border with Senegal.

In 2000, it had a population of 6,632.
