= Mohamed Salem Ould Béchir =

Mauritanian politician

His Excellency Mohamed Salem Ould Béchir
- محمد سالم ولد البشير

14th Prime Minister of Mauritania
- In office 30 October 2018 – 5 August 2019
- President: Mohamed Ould Abdel Aziz; Mohamed Ould Ghazouani
- Preceded by: Yahya Ould Hademine
- Succeeded by: Ismail Ould Bedde Ould Cheikh Sidiya

Personal details
- Born: 17 December 1962 (age 63) Ayoun el Atrous, Mauritania
- Party: Union for the Republic (UPR)

Mohamed Salem Ould Béchir (Hassaniyya: محمد سالم ولد البشير; born December 17, 1962) is a Mauritanian politician who served as Prime Minister of Mauritania from 2018 to 2019, following the resignation of his predecessor, Yahya Ould Hademine, and his government, in late October 2018.

== Biography ==
He studied robotics engineering in France. He began his career at the National Society of Water and Electricity of Mauritania (SOMELEC) in September 1986.

He was Secretary General of several ministries from May 2007 to September 2009, when he was appointed General Manager of the Mauritanian Electricity Company.He stepped down in September 2013 when he joined the government as Minister of Water and Sanitation.

In January 2015, he was appointed Minister of Petroleum, Energy and Mines, a position he held until 2016, when he was appointed Director of the National Society of Mining and Industry (SNIM).

In January 2023, Mohamed Salem Ould Béchir was serving as Mauritania's Minister of Foreign Affairs. On January 31, 2023, he welcomed Iranian Foreign Minister Hossein Amir-Abdollahian to Nouakchott, marking his continued involvement in Mauritania’s diplomatic efforts.

He was appointed prime minister after the resignation of Yahya Ould Hademine, several weeks after the triumph of the party in power, the party of the Union for the Republic (UPR), in the parliamentary elections of September 2018.

== Legal proceedings ==
He is accused by the National Anti-Corruption Prosecutor's Office of « bad governance and corruption », during his mandates at the head of the SNIM.

In April 2021, Ould Béchir was implicated in a high-profile corruption case investigating financial misconduct during former President Mohamed Ould Abdel Aziz's administration. The trial began on January 25, 2023, and brought several former officials to court.

== Acquittal ==
On December 4, 2023, the Criminal Court specializing in corruption crimes acquitted Mohamed Salem Ould Béchir, along with former Prime Minister Yahya Ould Hademine and former Minister of Petroleum Taleb Ould Abdi Vall, of all charges related to financial misconduct.

Political offices
Preceded by Yahya Ould Hademine	Prime Minister of Mauritania; 2018–2019	Succeeded by Ismail Ould Bedde Ould Cheikh Sidiya
