= Boulah Ould Mogueye =

Mauritanian politician and diplomat

Boulah Ould Mogueye (Arabic: بلاه ولد مكية) is a Mauritanian politician and diplomat. He was the secretary general of the Republican Party for Democracy and Renewal (PRDS) and the former ambassador of the Islamic Republic of Mauritania to the Russian Federation, and current ambassador to Algeria.

== See also ==
- Ambassador of Mauritania to Russia
