= Sahel Alliance =

International development alliance in Africa

The Sahel Alliance is an international cooperation platform to support development initiatives in the Sahel countries (Burkina Faso, Chad, Mali, Mauritania, and the Niger).

Since its launch in July 2017, the African Development Bank, Canada, Denmark, the European Investment Bank, the European Union, France, Germany, Italy, Luxembourg, the Netherlands, Norway, Spain, Sweden, the United Kingdom, the United Nations, the United States, and the West African Development Bank have joined the initiative as full members.
