= Initiative for the Resurgence of the Abolitionist Movement =

Anti-slavery group in Mauritania

The Initiative for the Resurgence of the Abolitionist Movement (IRA or IRA-Mauritania; French: Initiative pour la Resurgence du mouvement Abolitioniste) is an anti-slavery group in Mauritania headed by Biram Dah Abeid. Mauritania is estimated to have between 90,000 and 600,000 slaves. The group has a "network of nine thousand activists" according to journalist Alexis Okeowo.

The group was founded in 2008 and is described by Abeid as "an organization of popular struggle". The group has been involved in sit-ins in front of the justice ministry, hunger strikes, and marches through cities and towns around Mauritania. The group fights against the possible religious justification of slavery.

According to Abeid, the group moved on to more direct action in its protests because, "whenever we brought a slavery case to the police, they would release the slave owner." In 2010 and 2011, the group won a "seminal victory" when it gathered in front of the house of an alleged slave owner and demanded the police arrest him. Both Abeid and the slave owner were arrested—Abeid jailed for three months, the slave owner was released after nine days—but it was the first time that police in Mauritania had imprisoned a slave owner. Other protests and arrests of owners followed (the organization has helped to put about twenty owners in jail as of September 2014). Though the jailings were often only for brief terms, allegedly, the release of "thousands of slaves" (called "Biram Frees") by fearful owners ensued.

The Initiative feels under pressure from the Mauritanian government which refuses to allow it to register as a nongovernmental organization, and threatened or persuaded supporter to end their support. Lacking NGO status makes it impossible to solicit funding through grants. IRA has relied on gifts from patrons, mainly government employees. The government has persuaded other activists to leave the movement, threatening them or winning them over with lucrative state jobs.

IRA-Mauritania received the Human Rights Tulip award in December 2015.

In 2016, 13 IRA activists were arrested in June and July, and were sentenced to various sentences ranging between three years and fifteen years. In November 2016, a hearing in Zouérat reduced all of the activists' sentences; the last of the activists to be released from prison were Abdallahi Matallah Saleck and Moussa Biram in July 2018.

On 31 October 2025, IRA activist Warda Ahmed Souleimane was arrested on charges of "inciting the population to overthrow the regime".

== See also ==
- Slavery in Mauritania
- Slavery in Africa
- Slavery in modern Africa
