= Moulaye Ould Mohamed Laghdaf =

Prime Minister of Mauritania (2008–2014)

- مولاي ولد محمد لغظف

12th Prime Minister of Mauritania
- In office 14 August 2008 – 20 August 2014
- President: Mohamed Ould Abdel Aziz; Ba Mamadou Mbaré (Acting); Mohamed Ould Abdel Aziz
- Preceded by: Yahya Ould Ahmed El Waghef
- Succeeded by: Yahya Ould Hademine

Personal details
- Born: 12 December 1957 (age 68) Néma, French West Africa (now Mauritania)
- Party: Independent
- Other political affiliations: Rally of Democratic Forces

Moulaye Ould Mohamed Laghdaf (Arabic: مولاي ولد محمد لغظف; born 12 December 1957) served as the Prime Minister of Mauritania from August 2008 until August 2014.

== Life and career ==
Moulaye was born in Néma. An engineer and a member of the Tajakant tribe, he became Mauritania's Ambassador to Belgium and the European Union in 2006 before being appointed as prime minister by junta leader Mohamed Ould Abdel Aziz on August 14, 2008. His appointment followed a military coup earlier in the month, and some suggested that he might have been appointed in hopes that doing so would improve Mauritania's foreign relations, given Moulaye's diplomatic service in Europe. Moulaye was already viewed as being closely associated with Mohamed prior to his appointment.

On August 26, the Rally of Democratic Forces (RFD), the Alliance for Justice and Democracy - Movement for Renovation (AJD/MR), and the Movement for Direct Democracy (MDD) announced their decision to not participate in Moulaye's government because the junta had not clarified whether or not someone serving in the military would be allowed to stand as a presidential candidate and had not specified how long it intended to remain in power.

The new government led by Moulaye was appointed on August 31 and announced on television early on September 1. This government was composed of 28 members, aside from Moulaye, and its members were considered to be politically obscure technocrats. The government included several members of the RFD, despite that party's refusal to participate; the RFD responded by saying that the RFD members who had accepted posts in the government had "automatically resigned" from the party by doing so.

Moulaye announced on September 6, 2008, that an "open and constructive debate" would be held, in which members of Parliament, political parties, and other organizations would be invited to participate. The purpose of this debate, according to Moulaye, was to determine a timetable for holding a new election and consider various matters related to that election, including proposals for constitutional amendments and improved delineation of executive and legislative powers.

As part of a "deal" with the opposition, a national unity government was formed in June 2009 to lead the country at the time of the July 2009 presidential election; Moulaye was retained as prime minister. General Mohamed then won the presidential election and took office as president on August 5, 2009; Moulaye resigned as prime minister, but Mohamed reappointed him to lead a new, 27-member government on August 11.

Moulaye was replaced as prime minister by Yahya Ould Hademine in August 2014. He was instead appointed as Secretary-General of the Presidency, with the rank of minister, on 19 January 2015.

In 2021, he was jailed for corruption.

Political offices
| Preceded by Yahya Ould Ahmed El Waghef | Prime Minister of Mauritania; 2008–2014 | Succeeded by Yahya Ould Hademine |
