= List of prime ministers of Mauritania =

Prime Minister of the Islamic Republic of Mauritania
- الوزير الأول للجمهورية الإسلامية الموريتانية (Arabic); Premier Ministre de la République Islamique de la Mauritanie (French)
- Seal of Mauritania

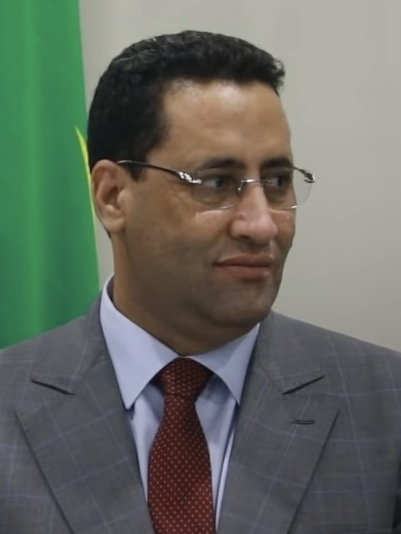
- Incumbent; Mokhtar Ould Djay since 2 August 2024
- Appointer: Mohamed Ould Ghazouani, as President of Mauritania
- Term length: None
- Inaugural holder: Moktar Ould Daddah
- Formation: 28 November 1960; 65 years ago
- Website: primature.gov.mr

This is a list of prime ministers of Mauritania since the formation of the post of Prime Minister of Mauritania in 1960 to the present day.

A total of seventeen people have served as Prime Minister of Mauritania (not counting one acting prime minister). Additionally, four persons, Mohamed Khouna Ould Haidalla, Maaouya Ould Sid'Ahmed Taya, Sidi Mohamed Ould Boubacar and Cheikh El Avia Ould Mohamed Khouna, have served on two non-consecutive occasions.

The current prime minister of Mauritania is Mokhtar Ould Djay, since 2 August 2024.

== List of officeholders ==
Political parties

Mauritanian Regroupment Party (PRM)
Democratic and Social Republican Party (PRDS)
National Pact for Democracy and Development (ADIL)
Union for the Republic (UPR)
El Insaf

Other factions

Military
Independent

Status

Acting Prime Minister

No.	Portrait	Name (Birth–Death)	Term of office			Political party	Head(s) of state
No.	Portrait	Name (Birth–Death)	Took office	Left office	Time in office	Political party	Head(s) of state
1		Moktar Ould Daddah (1924–2003)	28 November 1960	20 August 1961	265 days	PRM	Himself
Post abolished (20 August 1961 – 6 April 1979)
2		Ahmed Ould Bouceif (1934–1979)	6 April 1979 (Note: Appointed in the aftermath of the 1979 coup d'état.)	27 May 1979 (Died in office) (Note: Killed in an airplane crash in Senegal.)	51 days	Military	Salek
–		Ahmed Salim Ould Sidi (1939–1981)	28 May 1979	31 May 1979	3 days	Military	Salek
3		Mohamed Khouna Ould Haidalla (born 1940)	31 May 1979	12 December 1980	1 year, 195 days	Military	Salek
3		Mohamed Khouna Ould Haidalla (born 1940)	31 May 1979	12 December 1980	1 year, 195 days	Military	Louly
3		Mohamed Khouna Ould Haidalla (born 1940)	31 May 1979	12 December 1980	1 year, 195 days	Military	Himself
4		Sid Ahmed Ould Bneijara (1947–2017)	12 December 1980	25 April 1981 (Note: Dismissed in the aftermath of the 1981 coup attempt.)	134 days	Independent	Haidalla
5		Maaouya Ould Sid'Ahmed Taya (born 1941)	25 April 1981	8 March 1984	2 years, 318 days	Military	Haidalla
(3)		Mohamed Khouna Ould Haidalla (born 1940)	8 March 1984	12 December 1984 (Deposed in a coup)	279 days	Military	Himself
(5)		Maaouya Ould Sid'Ahmed Taya (born 1941)	12 December 1984	18 April 1992	7 years, 128 days	Military	Himself
6		Sidi Mohamed Ould Boubacar (born 1957)	18 April 1992	2 January 1996	3 years, 259 days	PRDS	Taya
7		Cheikh El Avia Ould Mohamed Khouna (born 1956)	2 January 1996	18 December 1997	1 year, 350 days	PRDS	Taya
8		Mohamed Lemine Ould Guig (born 1959)	18 December 1997	16 November 1998	333 days	PRDS	Taya
(7)		Cheikh El Avia Ould Mohamed Khouna (born 1956)	16 November 1998	6 July 2003 (Note: Dismissed and arrested in the aftermath of the 2003 coup attempt.)	4 years, 232 days	PRDS	Taya
9		Sghair Ould M'Bareck (born 1954)	6 July 2003	7 August 2005 (Deposed in a coup)	2 years, 32 days	PRDS	Taya
(6)		Sidi Mohamed Ould Boubacar (born 1957)	7 August 2005	20 April 2007	1 year, 256 days	PRDS	Vall
10		Zeine Ould Zeidane (born 1966)	20 April 2007	6 May 2008	1 year, 16 days	Independent	Abdallahi
11		Yahya Ould Ahmed El Waghef (born 1960)	6 May 2008	6 August 2008 (Deposed in a coup)	92 days	ADIL	Abdallahi
Vacant (6 – 14 August 2008)
12		Moulaye Ould Mohamed Laghdaf (born 1957)	14 August 2008	20 August 2014	6 years, 6 days	Independent	Abdel Aziz
12		Moulaye Ould Mohamed Laghdaf (born 1957)	14 August 2008	20 August 2014	6 years, 6 days	Independent	Mbaré
13		Yahya Ould Hademine (born 1953)	20 August 2014	29 October 2018	4 years, 70 days	UPR	Abdel Aziz
14		Mohamed Salem Ould Béchir (born 1962)	29 October 2018	5 August 2019	280 days	UPR	Abdel Aziz
14		Mohamed Salem Ould Béchir (born 1962)	29 October 2018	5 August 2019	280 days	UPR	Ghazouani
15		Ismail Ould Bedde Ould Cheikh Sidiya (born 1961)	5 August 2019	6 August 2020	1 year, 1 day	UPR	Ghazouani
16		Mohamed Ould Bilal (born 1963)	6 August 2020	2 August 2024	3 years, 362 days	UPR	Ghazouani
16		Mohamed Ould Bilal (born 1963)	6 August 2020	2 August 2024	3 years, 362 days	El Insaf (Note: Founded in 2022.)	Ghazouani
17		Mokhtar Ould Djay (born 1973)	2 August 2024	Incumbent	2 years, 36 days	El Insaf	Ghazouani

== See also ==
- Politics of Mauritania
- List of heads of state of Mauritania
- List of colonial governors of Mauritania
