= Cheikh El Avia Ould Mohamed Khouna =

Mauritanian politician

- شيخ العافية ولد محمد خونة

7th Prime Minister of Mauritania
- In office January 2, 1996 – December 18, 1997
- President: Maaouya Ould Sid'Ahmed Taya
- Preceded by: Sidi Mohamed Ould Boubacar
- Succeeded by: Mohamed Lemine Ould Guig
- In office November 16, 1998 – July 6, 2003
- President: Maaouya Ould Sid'Ahmed Taya
- Preceded by: Mohamed Lemine Ould Guig
- Succeeded by: Sghair Ould M'Bareck

Personal details
- Born: 1956 (age 69–70) French Mauritania
- Party: Republican Party for Democracy and Renewal (PRDS)

Cheikh El Avia Ould Mohamed Khouna (Arabic: شيخ العافية ولد محمد خونة; born 1956) is a Mauritanian political figure. He was the 7th Prime Minister of Mauritania from January 2, 1996, to December 18, 1997, Minister of Foreign Affairs from July 12, 1998, to November 16, 1998, and Prime Minister again from November 16, 1998, to July 6, 2003, under President Maaouya Ould Sid'Ahmed Taya; later, he briefly served as Minister of Foreign Affairs again in 2008.

== Biography ==
Cheikh El Avia was born in 1956 in Amourj in the eastern Mauritanian province of Hodh Ech Chargui. He was educated in nearby Néma and at a lycée in Nouakchott, graduating in 1978.

He received an advanced degree in agricultural science in Morocco, where he lived from 1978 to 1982. Cheikh El Avia returned to Mauritania and joined the civil service, serving as Director of the fisheries company Societe Mauritanienne de Commercialisation du Poisson (SMCP) from 1984 to 1992. He was Director of the Algerian-Mauritanian Fishing Company from 1992 to 1993, then became Secretary-General of the Mauritanian Ministry of Fishing in 1994. He was subsequently appointed to the government as Minister of Fisheries and Maritime Economy on February 21, 1995.

On January 2, 1996, Cheikh El Avia became Prime Minister, replacing Sidi Mohamed Ould Boubacar. In a surprise decision shortly after the reelection of the President, he stepped down as premier in December 1997 in favor of law professor Mohamed Lemine Ould Guig and became Minister Secretary-General of the Presidency. Between July 12 and November 16, 1998, Cheikh El Avia served as Minister of Foreign Affairs during a period of instability in the cabinet.

After leaving the Foreign Ministry, he was reappointed to the premiership under President Maaouya Ould Sid'Ahmed Taya. Cheikh El Avia helped to come up with and carry out the policies of the President and attended many important conferences in place of Taya. In the summer in 1999, Cheikh El Avia suffered a foreign policy setback when he could not secure an audience with Algerian President Abdelaziz Bouteflika due to Mauritania's establishing full ties with Israel. Relations between the two countries deteriorated dramatically despite having a good relationship for two decades prior. Cheikh El Avia denounced the opposition party, Action pour le Changement, in an important speech at the National Assembly in December 2001. The group was outlawed two weeks later. A member of the Republican Party for Democracy and Renewal, some of his aims were to address environmental issues.

In late December 2002, he announced that the government had responded "rapidly, efficiently and responsibly" to a potential famine and helped livestock farmers. He attacked the rise of Islamic extremism and the potential of youth recruitment to their cause in a May 2003 speech. Cheikh El Avia began to become critical of some of the actions of the President.

In the unsuccessful coup of June 9, 2003, he was detained on suspicion of having sympathies with the plotters of the coup and attempting to seek asylum in Spain. On July 6, Cheikh El Avia was replaced as premier by Sghair Ould M'Bareck, who previously served as Minister of Education. Cheikh El Avia would not serve in any cabinet position until 2008.

In the government of Prime Minister Yahya Ould Ahmed El Waghef, named on May 11, 2008, Cheikh El Avia was appointed Minister of Foreign Affairs. The inclusion of Cheikh El Avia and others who had served under Taya in Waghef's government was controversial, however. This government survived for only two months, and Cheikh El Avia was not included in the next government, appointed on July 15, 2008. In any case, the coup of August 6, 2008 led to the toppling of President Sidi Mohamed Ould Cheikh Abdallahi and his government.

On May 21, 2011, he was named Ambassador to Tunisia.

== Notes ==
Political offices
Preceded by Sidi Mohamed Ould Boubacar	Prime Minister of Mauritania; 1996–1997	Succeeded by Mohamed Lemine Ould Guig
Preceded by Mohamed Lemine Ould Guig	Prime Minister of Mauritania; 1998–2003	Succeeded by Sghair Ould M'Bareck
