= Yahya Ould Hademine =

Mauritanian engineer and politician

- يحيى ولد حدمين

Minister of Defense
- In office 15 March 2019 – 5 August 2019
- President: Mohamed Ould Abdel Aziz
- Preceded by: Mohamed Ould Ghazouani
- Succeeded by: Hanena Ould Sidi

13th Prime Minister of Mauritania
- In office 21 August 2014 – 29 October 2018
- President: Mohamed Ould Abdel Aziz
- Preceded by: Moulaye Ould Mohamed Laghdaf
- Succeeded by: Mohamed Salem Ould Béchir

Personal details
- Born: 31 December 1953 (age 72) Timbédra, French West Africa (now Mauritania)
- Party: Union for the Republic (UPR)
- Children: 4

Yahya Ould Hademine (Arabic: يحيى ولد حدمين; born December 31, 1953) is a Mauritanian engineer and politician who served as Defense Minister of Mauritania. He served as the Prime Minister of Mauritania from August 21, 2014 to October 29, 2018.

== Biography ==
Yahya Ould Hademine was born on December 31, 1953, in Timbédra. He received his primary education in Djigueni. Yahya attended the College of Aïoun between 1967 and 1970, and later studied at the Lycée national de Nouakchott from 1971 to 1974. After moving to Canada in 1974, he earned a degree in Metallurgical Engineering from the École Polytechnique de Montréal in 1979.

After moving back to Mauritania, he began working for the National industrial and mining company (SNIM), which mines for iron in Mauritania, and he became head of a steel mill in 1979.

Between 1985 and 1988 Yahya served as Head of Department purchases for SNIM. In 1989, he was promoted to CEO of the Arab Society of Iron and Steel (SAFA), which is a subsidiary of SNIM.

Yahya was appointed general manager of the Sanitation Maintenance and Transportation Works (SMTA) in 2008. He said there were too many engineers in the SMTA, and the quality of work was poor. After the 2008 Mauritanian coup d'état that overthrew President Sidi Ould Cheikh Abdallahi, Yahya sided with the coup leaders and was allowed to keep his job.

In December 2010, Yahya became Minister of Equipment and Transport. In his four years as minister, he made no significant changes.

After President Mohamed Ould Abdel Aziz was reelected in June 2014, he appointed Yahya to the premiership on August 21. Yahya replaced Moulaye Ould Mohamed Laghdaf, who had been Prime minister since 2008. Pledging to promote the participation of women in political, economic and social development, Yahya appointed seven women to his government when it was formed three days after his appointment as prime minister.

Yahya met with Chinese Special Envoy on the Middle East Issues Gong Xiaosheng on May 19, 2015, to discuss bilateral relations. He spoke at an agriculture conference in December 2015, and emphasized that his government fully supports the International Center for Agricultural Research in the Dry Areas (ICARDA)'s initiative to “expand wheat production in the country to enhance national food security and reduce dependence on increasing wheat imports.” In June 2016, he caused controversy when he called Ahmed Baba Ould Azizi, President of the General Confederation of Employers of Mauritania, "a terrorist, worse than Al Qaeda and Daesh together." He resigned from the premiership on October 29, 2018.

In 2022, he was accused of « bad governance, abuse of power and corruption », during his terms as prime minister and Minister of Transport, a judgment is required against him according to the National Anti-Corruption Prosecution.

== Personal life ==
Yahya is married and has four children. In 2021, he was jailed for corruption.

Political offices
Preceded by Moulaye Ould Mohamed Laghdaf	Prime Minister of Mauritania; 2014–2018	Succeeded by Mohamed Salem Ould Béchir
