= Sghair Ould M'Bareck =

Prime Minister of Mauritania (2003–2005)

- اسغير ولد امبارك

9th Prime Minister of Mauritania
- In office 6 July 2003 – 7 August 2005
- President: Maaouya Ould Sid'Ahmed Taya
- Preceded by: Cheikh El Avia Khouna
- Succeeded by: Sidi Mohamed Ould Boubacar

Personal details
- Born: 1954 (age 71–72) Néma, French Mauritania
- Party: Republican Party for Democracy and Renewal (PRDS)

Sghair Ould M'Bareck (Hassaniyya: اسغير ولد امبارك; born 1954) is a Mauritanian politician. He was the 9th Prime Minister of Mauritania from July 6, 2003, when he was appointed by President Maaouya Ould Sid'Ahmed Taya following an attempted coup in the previous month, until August 7, 2005, when he resigned following a successful coup against Maaouya. Sghair is a Haratin.

== Biography ==
Sghair, who was born in Néma, entered the government as Minister of National Education in April 1992. In 1993 he became Minister of Rural Development and the Environment, and in late 1995 he became Minister of Health and Social Affairs. He was Minister of National Education again from 1997 to 1998, then Minister of Trade, the Craft Industry and Tourism from 1998 to 1999. He became Minister of Equipment and Transport in late 1999, Minister of National Education again in 2000, and Minister of Justice in November 2001.

He was then appointed as Prime Minister in July 2003. He replaced Cheikh El Avia Ould Mohamed Khouna, who came from the same part of eastern Mauritania as many of the accused 2003 coup plotters.

President Maaouya was deposed in a military coup on August 3, 2005. Although the coup leaders requested on the following day that Sghair and other Government ministers remain in their posts, on August 7 he and his government resigned and the coup leaders named a new Prime minister, Sidi Mohamed Ould Boubacar, who had previously held that office from 1992 to 1996.

As of 2009, Sghair holds the post of Mediator of the Republic. He was one of four candidates standing in the June 2009 presidential election. He met with Interim President Ba Mamadou M'Bare in late April to submit a request for a two-month leave of absence in order to concentrate on his presidential candidacy.

Political offices
Preceded by Cheikh El Avia Ould Mohamed Khouna	Prime Minister of Mauritania; 2003–2005	Succeeded by Sidi Mohamed Ould Boubacar
