= Zeine Ould Zeidane =

Mauritanian economist and politician

- الزين ولد زيدان

10th Prime Minister of Mauritania
- In office 20 April 2007 – 6 May 2008
- President: Sidi Mohamed Ould Cheikh Abdallahi
- Preceded by: Sidi Mohamed Ould Boubacar
- Succeeded by: Yahya Ould Ahmed El Waghef

Personal details
- Born: 1966 (age 59–60) Tamchekett, Mauritania

Zeine Ould Zeidane (Arabic: الزين ولد زيدان; born 1966) is a Mauritanian economist and politician. He placed third as a candidate in the March 2007 presidential election, and he subsequently served as Prime Minister from April 2007 to May 2008.

== Biography ==
Born in Tamchekett, Zeine studied in Nouakchott, then at the University of Nice, in France. He taught briefly at the University of Nice before returning to Mauritania, where he taught at the University of Nouakchott before entering banking.

In 2000, he was posted to the World Bank, while he later served as economic Counsel to the President of Mauritania, Maaouya Ould Sid'Ahmed Taya. On June 26, 2004, he was appointed by Maaouya as Governor of the Central Bank of Mauritania. He was virtually the only minister to maintain his post following the coup of August 2005, leaving the position in September 2006 because of his presidential candidacy.

Zeine announced his candidacy on December 18, 2006. In the presidential election, which was held on March 11, 2007, he was the youngest candidate, standing as an independent. He took third place in the election with 15.28% of the votes cast. In the election, Zeine was considered by some to be the candidate favored by exiled former President Maaouya. On March 17, Zeine announced his support for Sidi Ould Cheikh Abdallahi in the second round of the election.

Sidi won the second round, held on March 25, and on April 20, one day after he took office as President, he appointed Zeine as Prime Minister. Zeine took office on April 21. Zeine's new Government was named on April 28; it included 28 members and was composed of technocrats who were largely considered obscure figures. Three of the ministers appointed were members of the People's Progressive Alliance (led by Messaoud Ould Boulkheir, another presidential candidate who backed Sidi in the second round).

Zeine presented the resignation of his government on May 6, 2008; Sidi accepted the resignation, and appointed Yahya Ould Ahmed El Waghef to succeed him on the same day.

Political offices
Preceded by Sidi Mohamed Ould Boubacar	Prime Minister of Mauritania; 2007–2008	Succeeded by Yahya Ould Ahmed El Waghef
