= 2009 Mauritanian presidential election =

- 18 July 2009
- Turnout: 64.58%
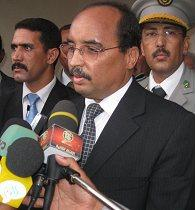

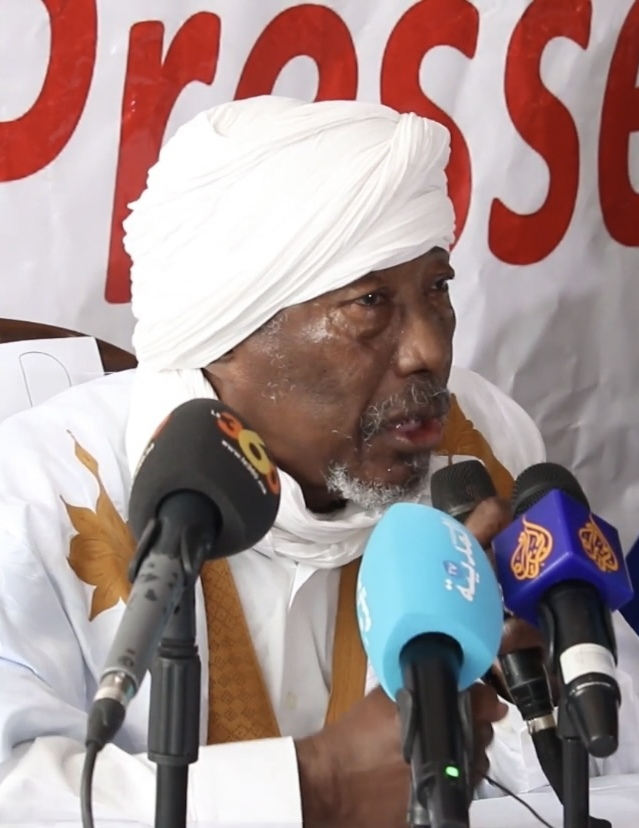

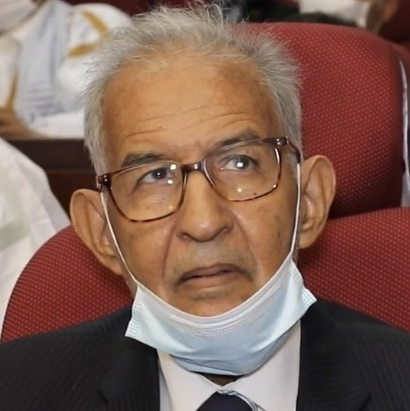
| Nominee | Mohamed Ould Abdel Aziz | Messaoud Ould Boulkheir | Ahmed Ould Daddah |
| Party | UPR | PPA | RFD |
| Popular vote | 409,024 | 126,520 | 105,931 |
| Percentage | 52.54% | 16.25% | 13.61% |
- Results by wilaya
President before election
Ba Mamadou Mbaré
Independent
Elected President
Mohamed Ould Abdel Aziz
UPR

Presidential elections were held in Mauritania on 18 July 2009. Mohamed Ould Abdel Aziz, who led the 2008 coup d'état, won a narrow first-round majority in the election, according to official results. A second round, if necessary, would have been held on 1 August 2009.

Following the coup which deposed President Sidi Ould Cheikh Abdallahi on 6 August 2008, the new junta (the High Council of State) promised that a presidential election would be held "as soon as possible". The election was subsequently scheduled for 6 June 2009.

Abdel Aziz, who was President of the High Council of State, stepped down in April 2009 in order to stand as a candidate. The opposition initially planned to boycott the election, arguing that the junta pursued a unilateral electoral agenda, and as a result Abdel Aziz was widely expected to win the election. Later, however, the opposition agreed to participate as part of a deal with the junta in June 2009, making the election appear more competitive; as part of the deal, the election was delayed to July and a national unity government was formed to lead the country through the election period.

== Background ==
On 15 September 2008, the National Assembly adopted plans to hold "free and fair elections" within 12–14 months, setting the election date in late 2009 at the latest. The chosen date of 6 June 2009 was announced by the official media on 23 January 2009.

Months before the election, it was widely expected that Abdel Aziz would stand as a candidate; Abdel Aziz said that retired officers should be allowed to run, fuelling speculation that he might retire from the army and run as a civilian. On 4 February 2009, while still expressing support for the coup and saying that Abdallahi should not be restored to the Presidency, Ahmed Ould Daddah—the country's main opposition leader, who heads the Rally of Democratic Forces (RFD) and placed second in the 2007 presidential election—proposed that the army give up power and that anyone who was serving in the military at the time of the coup should not be allowed to run in the presidential election. Abdel Aziz announced that he would run in the election on 29 March 2009, as was widely expected, and said that he would resign as Head of State (to be succeeded by the President of the Senate) in order to stand as a candidate.

On 8 April, Abdel Aziz told France 24 that he intended to resign prior to 22 April, as necessary for him to stand as a candidate. He also said that the election would be held as planned on 6 June, contradicting rumors of a delay that could facilitate possible mediation aimed at securing the participation of opposition parties. According to Abdel Aziz, the election was desired by 90% of the population. Later on 8 April, members of the pro-Abdallahi National Front for the Defense of Democracy (FNDD), including the President of the National Assembly, Massaoud Ould Boulkheir, held a protest in Nouakchott. Boulkheir denounced the "unilateral electoral agenda of the putschists" and warned that "neither tanks, nor guns nor live bullets can stop our fight against the usurpation of power by force". The announcement of a new electoral commission, headed by Cheikh Saadbouh Camara, also occurred on 8 April.

Opposition parties announced they would boycott the elections. The Alliance for Justice and Democracy/Movement for Renewal (AJD/MR), led by Ibrahima Sarr, expressed support for the military junta, and Sarr announced on April 11, 2009, that he would be a candidate in the election. Sarr said that "the conditions are there for a free poll" and that Mauritania did not have democracy under Abdallahi's presidency. Kane Hamidou Baba, Vice-President of the National Assembly and Vice-President of the RFD, also sought to stand as a candidate, although he did so without the approval of the RFD. Due to Baba's friendly attitude towards the junta, he was expelled from the FNDD coalition. Another candidate was Sghair Ould M'Bareck, who served as Prime Minister under President Maaouya Ould Sid'Ahmed Taya from 2003 to 2005.

Abdel Aziz resigned on 15 April 2009 and was succeeded by Ba Mamadou Mbaré as Acting President. The deadline for the registration of presidential candidacies expired on 22 April; by that point none of the major opposition leaders, including RFD President Daddah, had registered, as they were all participating in the boycott. Observers concluded that the lack of a credible challenger meant that Abdul Aziz would easily win the election, although they noted that the credibility of the election itself could be threatened by the opposition boycott.

The Constitutional Court approved four candidacies on 27 April: those of Abdel Aziz, Ibrahima Sarr, Kane Hamidou Baba, and Sghair Ould M'Bareck. All of these candidates were sympathetic to the coup. The Union for the Republic (UPR) political party elected Abdel Aziz as its President at the party's constituent assembly on 5 May 2009; the UPR holds a parliamentary majority.

Abdel Aziz met with Senegalese President Abdoulaye Wade and envoys from the African Union on 14 May 2009; although they reportedly wanted the election to be delayed in order to encourage the opposition to participate, Abdel Aziz said after the meeting that there would be no delay. Wade also met separately with Abdallahi and Daddah. Daddah said at a press conference on 26 May that there could be no talks unless the junta agreed to release political prisoners and suspend the electoral timetable.

Shortly before the scheduled date of the election, in reconciliation talks on 31 May 2009 it was agreed to postpone the election to 21 July and 4 August; this was later denied by the government, and on 2 June 2009 it was announced that it had been postponed to 18 July and 1 August. A final agreement between the junta and the opposition was signed on 4 June. The agreement provided for Abdallahi's formal resignation as President, the installation of a national unity government that would serve briefly prior to the election, and set the date of the election as 18 July. As a result of the agreement, all of the major parties were expected to participate in the election.

Ely Ould Mohamed Vall, who headed the 2005–2007 military junta, announced on 6 June 2009 that he would be a presidential candidate, running as an independent. He condemned the 2008 coup, asserting that it was "wrong and there was no reason for it" and that it had "provoked a particularly dangerous situation in our country". He stressed, however, that his candidacy was not directed against any particular individual, and he said that his goal, if elected, was "to build a reconciled country that is politically and economically viable and stable". He also said that he would "probably no longer be interested in public affairs" if not for the 2008 coup. The RFD announced on 9 June that Daddah had been designated as the party's presidential candidate by a special party congress. Observers considered Abdel Aziz, Daddah, and Vall to be the key candidates.

The moderate Islamist National Rally for Reform and Development (RNRD), which opposed the coup and participated in the FNDD, designated its President, Mohamed Jemil Ould Mansour, as its candidate on 14 June. Although the party chose to run its own candidate, it said that it would continue coordinating with the FNDD.

== Candidates ==
After the postponement of the elections and the formation of an interim government, ten candidates registered to run in the election and were approved by the Constitutional Council — the four candidates who had already registered to run before the Dakar Agreement:

- Mohamed Ould Abdel Aziz, leader of the 2008 coup d'état and Head of State from 2008 to 2009
- Ibrahima Moctar Sarr, leader of the Alliance for Justice and Democracy/Movement for Renewal (AJD/MR)
- Sghair Ould M'Bareck, Prime Minister under Maaouya Ould Sid'Ahmed Taya from 2003 to 2005
- Kane Hamidou Baba, Vice-President of the National Assembly of Mauritania and deputy leader of the Rally of Democratic Forces (RDF) — running without his party's support or approval

and six additional candidates:

- Ahmed Ould Daddah, leader of the Rally of Democratic Forces (RDF)
- Mohamed Jemil Ould Mansour, President of the National Rally for Reform and Development (RNRD, Tawassoul)
- Messaoud Ould Boulkheir, leader of the People's Progressive Alliance (APP), President of the National Assembly of Mauritania since 2007
- Ely Ould Mohamed Vall, leader of the 2005 coup d'état and Head of State from 2005 to 2007
- Hamada Ould Meimou, Mauritania's Ambassador to Kuwait
- Saleh Ould Hanenna, President of the Mauritanian Party of Union and Change (HATEM), leader of attempted coups d'état in 2003 and 2004

The main rhetorical theme of the campaign, which was described as "lacklustre" by Agence France-Presse, was the need for change and development. Abdel Aziz, also stressing the importance of change, presented himself as a champion of the poor; he had substantially lowered the prices of basic goods and services, engaged in public works projects, and granted land rights. In light of those efforts, as well as a purported tendency among Mauritanians to favor strong rule, analysts judged that he was the front-runner. The New York Times reported that support for Abdel Aziz in Dar Naim, a "desperately poor" Nouakchott neighborhood, was "universal".

A survey in the newspaper Le Rénovateur had Abdel Aziz, Daddah, and Boulkheir as the top three candidates. Boulkheir, a black descendant of slaves, notably won support from many white Moors (the traditionally dominant ethnic group), marking a significant change from past attitudes; some compared Boulkheir to United States President Barack Obama. Boulkheir was supported by Abdallahi, and Boulkheir and Daddah agreed that each would support the other if either reached a second round against Abdel Aziz.

== Conduct ==
In the hours prior to the beginning of voting, a shootout occurred in Nouakchott between police and suspected Islamist militants. Two of the suspects were arrested, and the government said that they were involved in the death of Christopher Leggett, an American who was killed in Nouakchott on 23 June.

The election was monitored by more than 200 elections observers, including those from the African Union and the Arab League. Voting opened at 7:00 a.m. UTC and lasted for twelve hours. Some Mauritanians living outside of the nation who had registered for the election were unable to vote because their names did not appear on voting lists. They say it is because they opposed the 2008 Mauritanian coup d'état. One such Mauritanian, Mohamed Sidatt, said that 300 people, including himself, who had registered to vote did not have their names on the final voting lists. Sidatt said, "I did [register] and I have a valid Mauritanian passport, but my name did not appear on the final list. And I know it's because I was an active voice against the military coup."

Observers from the African Union, La Francophonie, the Organisation of the Islamic Conference, Arab Maghreb Union, and the Community of Sahel-Saharan States jointly endorsed the conduct of the election as "satisfactory". Meanwhile, FNDD spokesman Mohamed Ould Mouloud alleged "massive fraud"; he said that the coalition would gather evidence and take the matter to the Constitutional Court.

Abdel Aziz, voting in Nouakchott, expressed confidence that he would win in the first round, although observers expected that a second round would be necessary. He also said that if he won the election it would mean "the victory of change for a prosperous Mauritania, worthy of its independence". Also on election day, Vall alleged fraud, saying that in some cases the votes of whole villages had been bought. Boulkheir, voting in Nouakchott, stressed that the country would "never turn back" to dictatorship.

== Results ==
Partial results on 19 July, with 61.17% of votes counted, showed Abdel Aziz with a narrow first-round majority of 52.2%; his supporters celebrated in the streets of Nouakchott. Boulkheir and Daddah, the main opposition candidates, trailed distantly with 16.63% and 13.89% respectively. Mansour had 4.66% and Vall had 3.78%. Also on 19 July, Boulkheir, Daddah, Vall, and Meimou jointly denounced the results as fraudulent. Later in the day, the results remained essentially unchanged with 92% of the votes counted. Boulkheir said, "We refuse to recognize these results and call on the international community to create a commission to investigate to expose this manipulation." At a press conference, Abdel Aziz dismissed the claims of fraud, saying that the opposition had not presented any proof. Interior Minister Mohamed Ould Rzeizim then declared Abdel Aziz the winner on the same day, crediting him with 52.58%; Rzeizim placed turnout at 64.58%.

| Candidate | Party | Votes | % |
|---|---|---|---|
| Mohamed Ould Abdel Aziz | Union for the Republic | 409,024 | 52.54 |
| Messaoud Ould Boulkheir | APP–FNDD | 126,520 | 16.25 |
| Ahmed Ould Daddah | Rally of Democratic Forces | 105,931 | 13.61 |
| Mohamed Jemil Ould Mansour | National Rally for Reform and Development | 36,864 | 4.74 |
| Ibrahima Moctar Sarr | AJD/MR | 35,553 | 4.57 |
| Ely Ould Mohamed Vall | Independent | 29,862 | 3.84 |
| Kane Hamidou Baba | Independent | 11,542 | 1.48 |
| Saleh Ould Hanenna | Mauritanian Party of Union and Change | 11,191 | 1.44 |
| Hamada Ould Meimou | Independent | 9,980 | 1.28 |
| Sghair Ould M'Bareck | Independent | 1,964 | 0.25 |
| Total | | 778,431 | 100.00 |
| Valid votes | | 778,431 | 95.28 |
| Invalid/blank votes | | 38,543 | 4.72 |
| Total votes | | 816,974 | 100.00 |
| Registered voters/turnout | | 1,265,063 | 64.58 |
Source: African Elections Database

== Aftermath ==
Independent candidate Kane Hamidou Baba promptly accepted the results and congratulated Abdel Aziz, as did Mansour, the Tawassoul candidate, and Hanenna, the HATEM candidate.

Sid'Ahmed Ould Deye, the President of the National Independent Election Commission (CENI), announced on 21 July that Boulkheir, Daddah, Vall, and Meimou had filed complaints regarding the election; on the same day, it was reported that Boulkheir, Daddah, and Vall had appealed to the Constitutional Court regarding the results. Ould Deye resigned on 23 July 2009, stating that he now had doubts about the reliability of the election results. A few hours later, the Constitutional Court confirmed Abdel Aziz's victory. Daddah then called for "a recount of the votes and a chemical analysis of the ballot papers", while urging the people "to reject this new coup d'etat" and "use all forms of democratic struggle". He also expressed praise for Deye's "refusal to assent to this electoral masquerade".

At a press conference on 30 July, Vall said that the election was merely a means of legitimizing the 2008 coup and that it had effectively reverted the country to the authoritarianism it had experienced under President Maaouya Ould Sid'Ahmed Taya, who Vall and Abdel Aziz ousted in 2005. He also said that he would continue to struggle against Abdel Aziz's regime.

Abdel Aziz was sworn in at a ceremony in Nouakchott on 5 August 2009, one day prior to the first anniversary of the coup that initially brought him to power. About 20,000 people were in attendance, along with several regional leaders: Senegalese President Abdoulaye Wade, Malian President Amadou Toumani Toure, Moroccan Prime Minister Abbas El Fassi, and Gambian Vice-President Isatou Njie-Saidy. Representatives of the African Union were also present.
