= Sidi Mohamed Ould Boubacar =

Mauritanian politician (born 1957)

- سيدي محمد ولد بوبكر
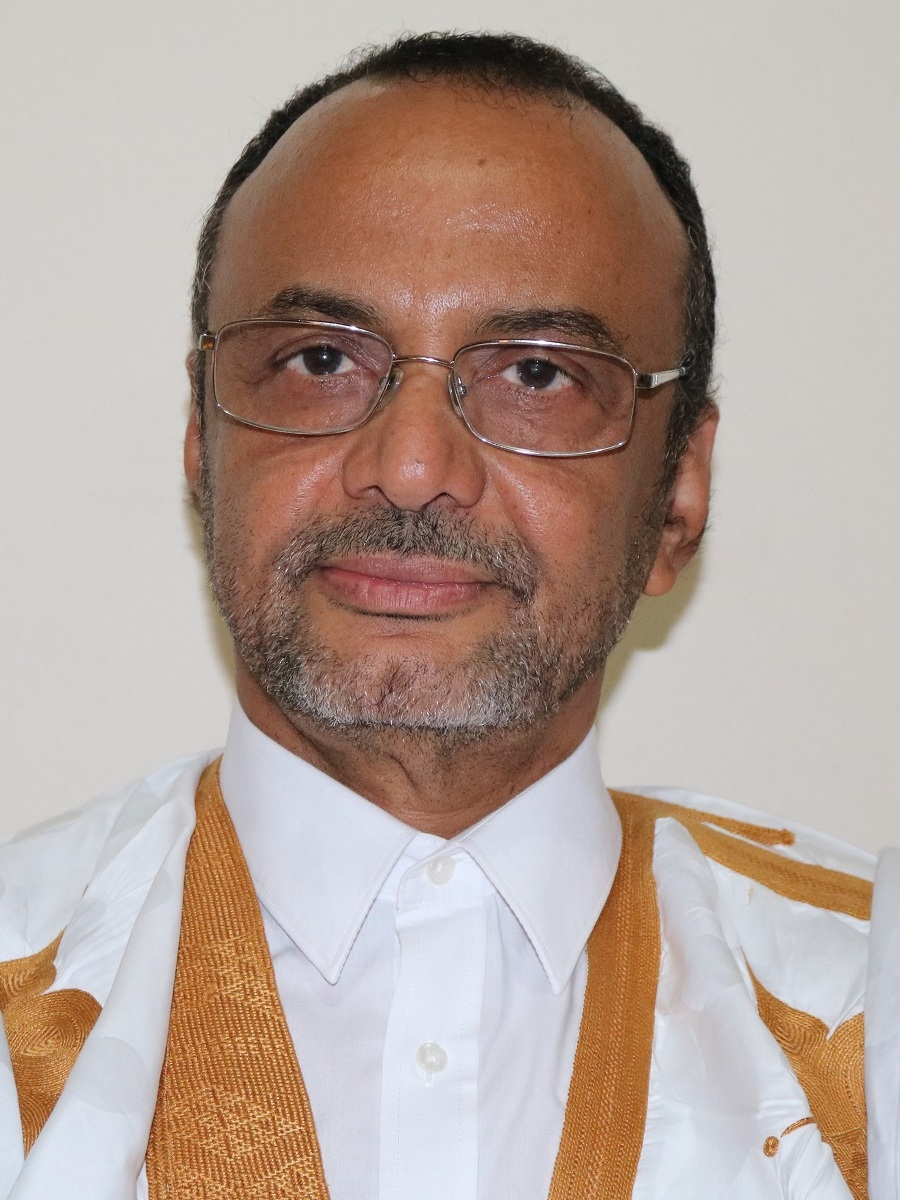
- Ould Boubacar in 2017

6th Prime Minister of Mauritania
- In office 18 April 1992 – 2 January 1996
- President: Maaouya Ould Sid'Ahmed Taya
- Preceded by: Maaouya Ould Sid'Ahmed Taya
- Succeeded by: Cheikh El Avia Ould Mohamed Khouna
- In office 7 August 2005 – 20 April 2007
- President: Ely Ould Mohamed Vall
- Preceded by: Sghair Ould M'Bareck
- Succeeded by: Zeine Ould Zeidane

Personal details
- Born: 31 May 1957 (age 69) Atar, French Mauritania
- Party: Republican Party for Democracy and Renewal (PRDS)

Sidi Mohamed Ould Boubacar (Arabic: سيدي محمد ولد بوبكر; born 31 May 1957) is a Mauritanian politician who has been Prime Minister of Mauritania twice, from 1992 to 1996 and again from 2005 to 2007.

== Life and career ==
Born in Atar in 1957, Sidi Mohamed studies law at the University of Orléans, obtaining a Master of Advanced Studies in political economy in 1981. He is regional treasurer in Nouadhibou in April 1983 and then technical adviser to the Minister of Finance and Trade in November 1983. In March 1984, he became Treasurer-General of Mauritania.

Subsequently, during the rule of Maaouya Ould Sid'Ahmed Taya, he became Director of the supervision of publicly owned establishments in 1985, Director of the budget in 1986 and Controller-General of finances in 1987. He became Director of the plan in December 1987, then Director of the treasury and public accounts in April 1988.

Sidi Mohamed Ould Boubacar became Minister of Finance in October 1990 and was appointed prime minister on 18 April 1992. He held the latter position until he was dismissed by President Maaouya on 2 January 1996. On 6 January 1996, he was elected Secretary-General of the ruling party, the Democratic and Social Republican Party (PRDS). He was appointed Director of the Presidential Cabinet in 2001. And he became Mauritania's Ambassador to France in 2004.

Following a military coup against Maaouya on 3 August 2005, he returned to his country from France (where he was appointed Ambassador by the Ould Taya's Government in 2004), on 6 August and was appointed prime minister on 7 August by Col. Ely Ould Mohamed Vall, head of the Military Council for Justice and Democracy (CMJD). Sidi Mohamed's appointment came shortly after the resignation of Sghair Ould M'Bareck, Maaouya's last prime minister before he was ousted in a coup. Sidi Mohamed is a member of the Republican Party for Democracy and Renewal, the successor party of the ruling PRDS.

Like the members of Military Council for Justice and Democracy, Sidi Mohamed was not allowed to run for president in the March 2007 presidential election. Following the election and the confirmation of the results by the Constitutional Council, Sidi Mohamed submitted his resignation to Ely on 31 March; he was asked to remain in office in a caretaker capacity until the swearing in of the new president, Sidi Ould Cheikh Abdallahi, on 19 April, after which Sidi appointed Zeine Ould Zeidane as prime minister on 20 April.

He then serves as ambassador to Spain, then Egypt and later to the United Nations.

He was a presidential candidate in the June 2019 elections. On 22 June 2019, he received 17.87% of the electoral votes behind General Mohamed Ould Ghazouani (52.01%) and activist Biram Dah Abeid (18.58) in the election.

Political offices
Preceded by Maaouya Ould Sid'Ahmed Taya	Prime Minister of Mauritania; 1992–1996	Succeeded by Cheikh El Avia Ould Mohamed Khouna
Preceded by Sghair Ould M'Bareck	Prime Minister of Mauritania; 2005–2007	Succeeded by Zeine Ould Zeidane
