= Mohamed Ould Abdel Aziz =

President of Mauritania from 2009 to 2019

General Mohamed Ould Abdel Aziz
- محمد ولد عبد العزيز
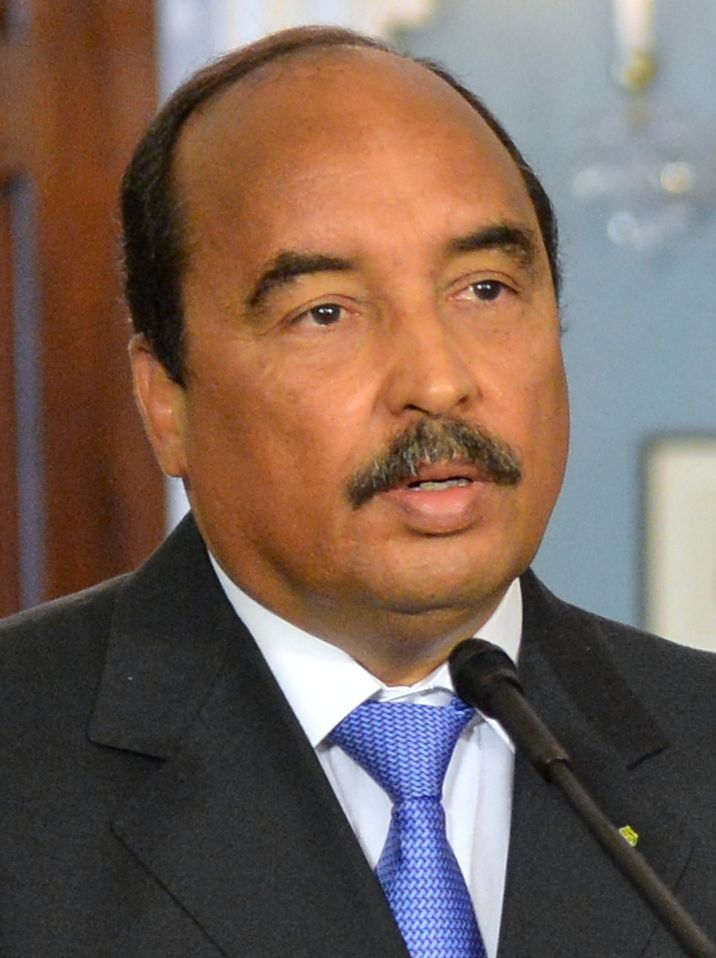
- Mohamed in 2014

8th President of Mauritania
- In office 5 August 2009 – 1 August 2019
- Prime Minister: Moulaye Laghdaf; Yahya Ould Hademine; Mohamed Salem Ould Béchir
- Preceded by: Sidi Ould Cheikh Abdallahi
- Succeeded by: Mohamed Ould Ghazouani

12th Chairperson of the African Union
- In office 30 January 2014 – 30 January 2015
- Preceded by: Hailemariam Desalegn
- Succeeded by: Robert Mugabe

President of the High Council of State
- In office 6 August 2008 – 15 April 2009
- Prime Minister: Moulaye Laghdaf
- Preceded by: Office established
- Succeeded by: Office abolished

Personal details
- Born: 20 December 1956 (age 69) Akjoujt, Mauritania, French West Africa
- Party: Union for the Republic
- Spouse: Mariam Mint Ahmed Aicha
- Occupation: Politician; military officer

Military service
- Allegiance: Mauritania
- Branch/service: Mauritanian Army
- Years of service: 1977 – 2009
- Rank: General

Mohamed Ould Abdel Aziz (Hassaniyya: محمد ولد عبد العزيز; born 20 December 1956) is a retired Mauritanian military officer and politician who served as the 8th President of Mauritania from 2009 to 2019.

A career soldier and high-ranking officer, he was a leading figure in the August 2005 coup that ousted President Maaouya Ould Sid'Ahmed Taya, and later in August 2008, he led another coup, that removed President Sidi Ould Cheikh Abdallahi. After the 2008 coup, Mohamed became president of the High Council of State as part of what was described as a political transition leading to a new election. He resigned from that post in April 2009 in order to stand as a candidate in the July 2009 presidential election, which he won. He took office in August 2009. He was subsequently re-elected in 2014, then did not seek re-election in 2019. He was succeeded by Mohamed Ould Ghazouani, who assumed office in August 2019.

Mohamed also held the role of chairman of the African Union from 2014 to 2015.

In June 2021, Mohamed was arrested and detained on charges of corruption. He was sentenced to five years' imprisonment in December 2023, which was extended to 15 years in May 2025.

== Early life ==
Mohamed Ould Abdel Aziz was born in Akjoujt on 20 December 1956. He joined the Meknes Royal Military Academy in Morocco in 1977, and, after a string of promotions, established the elite BASEP (Presidential Security Battalion). He played a key role in suppressing an attempted coup in June 2003 and a military uprising in August 2004.

He received Mauritania's highest military award for his role in stopping the 2004 uprising.

== 2005 coup leader ==
A military coup on 3 August 2005, led by Ely Ould Mohamed Vall, Director-General of the Sûreté Nationale, and Colonel Mohamed Ould Abdel Aziz, who was commander of the Presidential Guard (BASEP), overthrew President Maaouya Ould Sid'Ahmed Taya. Colonel Mohamed was one of the main actors in the actual carrying out of this coup.

At the time, Mohamed was described by a Western academic as a leader of a Mauritanian Nasserist group, pan-Arab secular nationalists. Western sources, citing Mohamed's background in coming from a traditionally favored Oulad Bou Sbaa Chorfa tribe, questioned the general's commitment to democracy and reversing the history of ethnic and class inequities in the nation.

Contrary to this, the Mauritanian press credited Mohamed for pushing to reduce military rule from 24 to 19 months and for attempting to limit voter fraud in the coming election.

== Under President Sidi Ould Cheikh Abdallahi ==
On 30 August 2007, President Sidi named Mohamed his Presidential Chief of Staff (Chef d'Etat-major particulier du Président de la République). Mohamed, now a General, continued to work closely with the President: at the end of February 2008 he served as a personal envoy of the President to King Mohammed VI of Morocco. General Mohamed was also commander of the forces sent to apprehend Group for Preaching and Combat militants who had killed four French tourists at Aleg in December 2007.

A May 2008 article contrasted Mohamed's continuing involvement at the center of political power with Ely Ould Mohamed Vall, who had left public life. Mohamed remained both Advisor to the President and General, and was described as being at the nexus of "a small galaxy of other colonels, businessmen and politicians, in an uneasy balance."

A conflict with the President was clearly growing in June 2008. At the end of June, the left-wing UFP party reported that they believed Mohamed and Ghazouani were planning for a coup, but were attempting a strategy of political change by hiving "independent" parliamentarians off from the government, which would replace the President peacefully.

A mass defection in the ranks of the ruling PNDD-ADIL party on 4 August 2008 (two days before the coup) with 25 Parliamentary deputies and 23 senators was reported to have been inspired by military leaders, and would have left the president unable to govern.

== 2008 coup leader ==
=== 6 August coup d'état ===
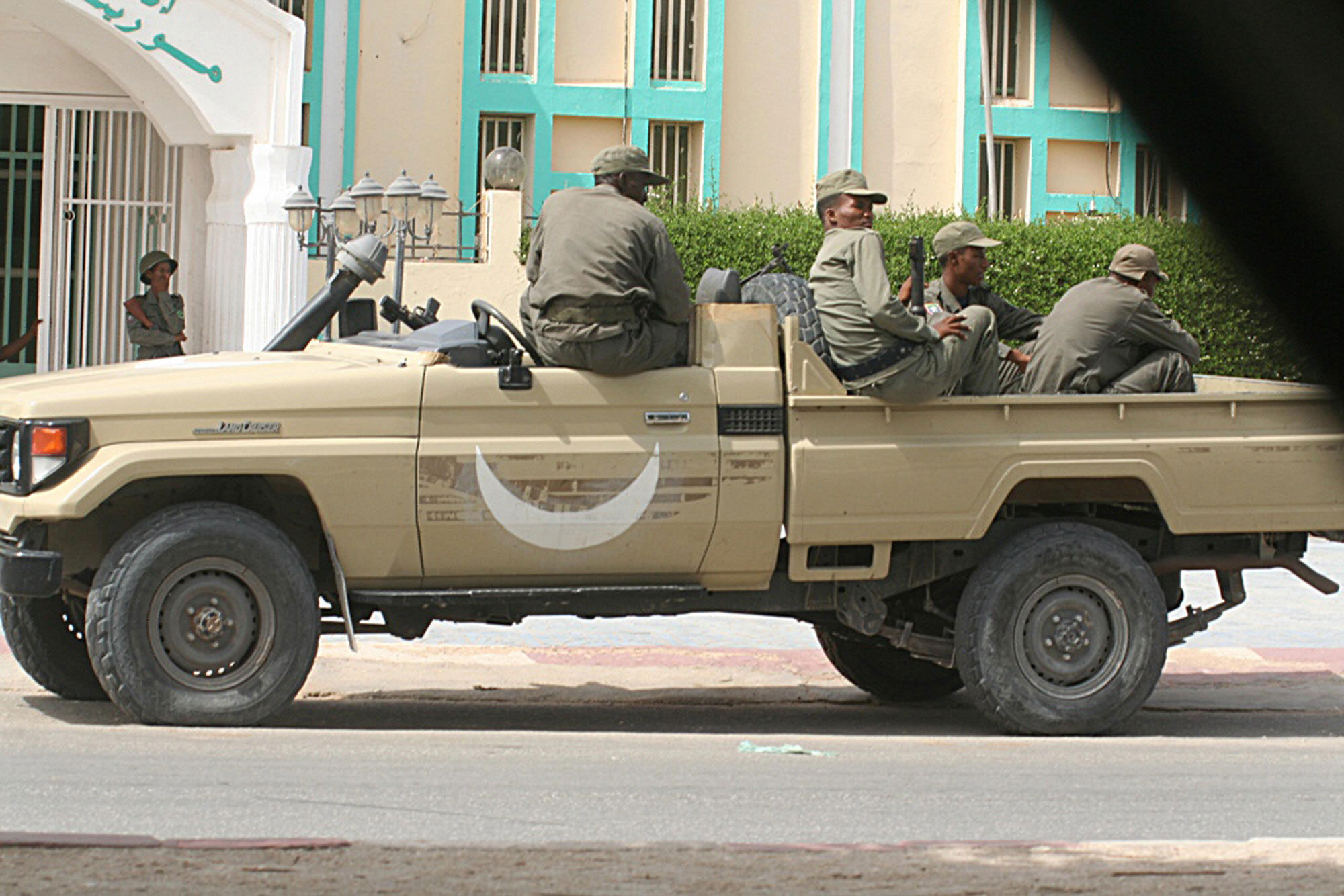
Mauritanian soldiers after coup.

On 6 August 2008, Mohamed was ordered removed by Abdallahi from his command, along with several senior officers including General Muhammad Ould Al-Ghazwani, General Felix Negri, and Brigadier-General (Aqid) Ahmed Ould Bakri. The first announcement of the State Council was to annul this decree.

By 9:20 local time, BASEP troops seized the President, Prime Minister, and Interior Minister in the capital, Nouakchott. Mauritania television was taken off the air earlier, but Arabia-based al-Arabiya television played an announcement said to be from the new military junta. According to an official statement released on 7 August Sidi's powers were terminated and Mauritania would be governed on a transitional basis by an 11-member High Council of State, with Mohamed as the president of the council, until a new presidential election was held "as soon as possible".

=== Transition ===
Public reaction to the 2008 coup by western governments in the days after 6 August were hostile, with particularly harsh condemnation coming from former colonial power and past economic supporter France. In the two weeks following the coup, Mohamed met with a number of foreign delegations, made personal phone calls to foreign leaders, and gave a number of press interviews to the international media. In these he stated that his actions were legal, a response to "anti-constitutional" oppression by the previous government, and that although "forced to take power" he had no desire for power. He did not rule out running in the promised elections, however. A Saudi-based newspaper claimed that the General was motivated by a combination of disgust at the corruption of those close to Abdallahi, but also over legal threats against Mohamed and others by the president regarding the behavior of the Mauritanian military during the mass expulsion of black Africans in 1989.

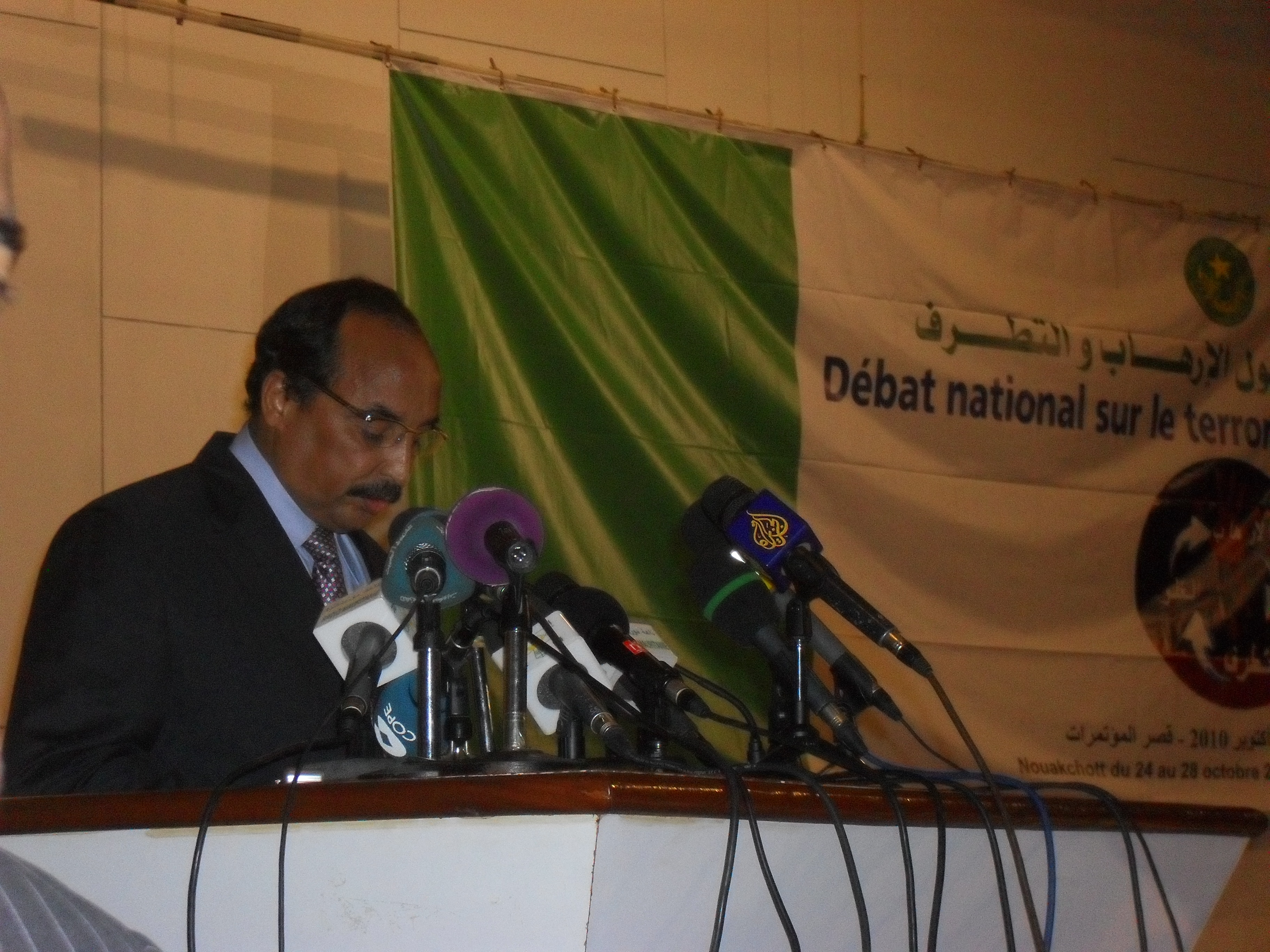
Mohamed during transitional presidency January 2009.

Mohamed's initial list of names for the High Council of State included five civilians, released on 7 August along with a statement that former government ministers could retain their jobs. By the end of the same day, this list had been revised, without public explanation, to include all military figures. Two small demonstrations were held on the day following the coup: one opposing the seizure of power, which was dispersed by the police with tear gas, and one march supporting the military, at which Mohamed spoke. At that demonstration, marchers already carried life size photographs of Mohamed in military uniform. Within a week, a majority of the Mauritanian Parliament voted to authorize the coup, and on the 13th, Mohamed signed a decree appointing Moulaye Ould Mohamed Laghdaf as Prime Minister of Mauritania. The Council stated that Mohamed had the power to appoint the prime minister, military officials and civil servants in Mauritania.

=== Stabilization ===
Neighboring support was somewhat forthcoming, with Morocco's government press calling Mohamed a patriot, an advisor of the Moroccan king coming to Nouakchott to meet with Mohamed, and Libya and Senegal eventually pronounced their support for the new government. In contrast, the Algerian government has stridently opposed the coup, even while quietly receiving a visit from Mohamed's close ally and the new Mauritanian Chief of Armed Forces, Muhammad Ould Al-Ghazwani, and has attempted to rally the African Union and Arab states against Mohamed.

The United States has consistently issued press releases from the Department of State condemning the coup d'état as illegal and unconstitutional. The African Union has issued condemnation of General Mohamed as well as travel bans and the freezing of assets of Mohamed and those connected with the coup and the illegal seizure of the Mauritanian government.

The BBC has pointed out that the General, who was previously seen as a supporting player in the 2005 coup, is now seen as having been the power behind the previous junta. It was also noted that the General, never seen without his military uniform, is already addressed by government staff as "president". An ally of Mohamed was quoted saying "He's a simple man, who likes order." Apart from deriding corruption and government inaction, Mohamed stressed his opposition to Islamic fundamentalism. An internet threat, released on 12 August, alleged to be from Al-Qaeda threatened the coup leaders, and General Mohamed took the opportunity to stress his fidelity to the anti-terrorist operation which the United States government had funded in Mauritania since 2003 but suspended following the 6 August coup.

== 2009 presidential election ==
The coup government of General Mohamed promised that it would hold a free and fair election for president on 6 June 2009. On 5 February 2009, Mauritanian state media reported that the General would stand as a candidate for president in that election.

Despite this attempt to legitimize the post-coup government, the African Union carried out a sanctions regime first agreed on 22 December 2008, and continued to recognize Sidi Ould Cheikh Abdallahi as the Mauritanian Head of State. The largest opposition parties initially refused to take part in the election, calling it "predetermined" and a "farce". Ould Mohamed headed a list of sanctions targets by the African Union which was put into effect on 6 February 2009. The sanctions against government and military officials who backed the August coup prevent travel to AU nations, the issuing of visas or travel documents to these individuals, and the seizure of bank assets within AU nations. In order to stand as a candidate in the presidential election, Mohamed was required to step down as Head of State. He did so on 15 April, as expected, and the President of the Senate, Ba Mamadou Mbare, succeeded him in an interim capacity. Members of the opposition decried the move, saying the General was retaining real power. Mohamed Ould Maouloud, a leader in the National Front for the Defence of Democracy (FNDD) opposition coalition, was quoted in the foreign press as saying: "It's a false resignation, a pretend resignation that the general is doing to trick public opinion and have people accept the putsch."

The Union for the Republic political party elected Mohamed as its president at the party's constituent assembly on 5 May 2009. In the presidential election held on 18 July 2009, Mohamed won a first-round majority of 52.58%. He then resigned as party leader on 2 August 2009, as the President of Mauritania cannot be a member of any party.

Mohamed Ould Abdel Aziz was sworn in as President at a ceremony held in Nouakchott on 5 August 2009.

== 2012 shooting ==
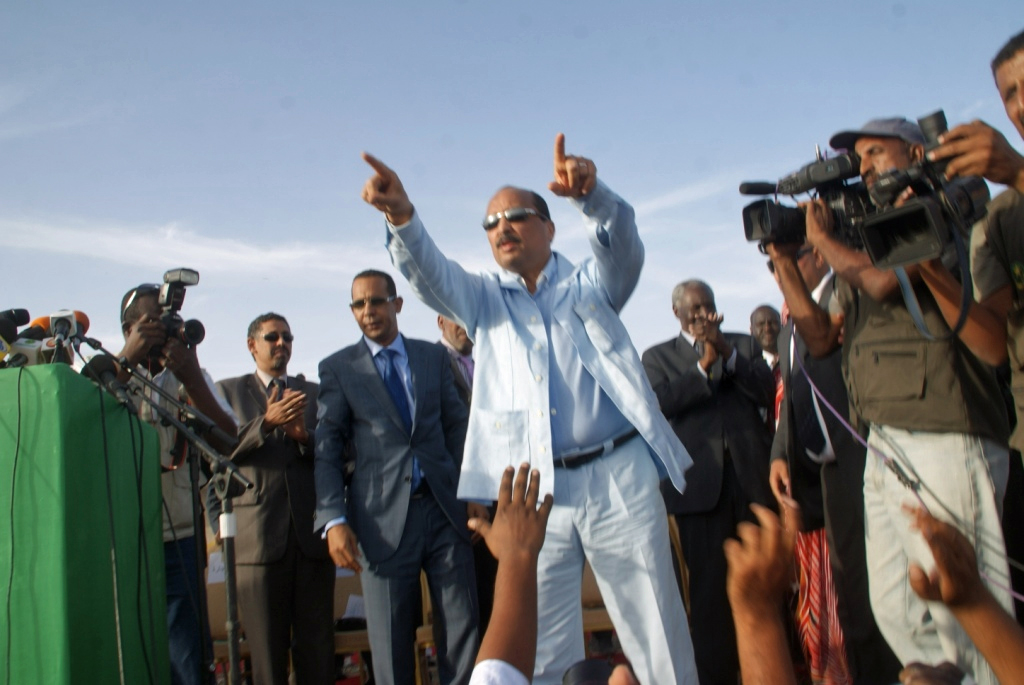
Mohamed speaks at a popular festival in Nouadhibou on 13 March the year he was shot.

Mohamed was shot on 13 October 2012 in disputed circumstances. The country's Communications Minister, Hamdi Ould Mahjoub, reported that the president was shot in the arm, while Reuters medical sources said it was in the abdomen. Initially, Mauritanian radio reported that Mohamed survived an assassination attempt, but Mohamed subsequently said that he was accidentally shot by an army unit and was successfully operated on for minor injuries. Witnesses claim Mohamed was directly targeted by men who ran away after the shooting.

Mohamed received an initial operation at a military hospital in Nouakchott, and then, according to the French defense ministry, was transferred to Percy-Clamart military hospital in Paris for additional treatment.

== Presidency ==
In April 2010, the governments of Mauritania, Mali, Niger, and Algeria established a joint command to tackle the threat of terrorism.

In November 2012, the Government of Mauritania began to allow privately owned TV stations for the first time. A draft bill had been created in 2010 by the Senate of Mauritania.

As for that in his party won the 2013 Mauritanian parliamentary election with 21% of the vote and they gained 15 seats in parliament. The cause for this was because Mohamed Mahmoud Ould Mohamed Lemine who was Union for the Republic's president told Mauritanians a majority in parliament would so that they could support the program of President.

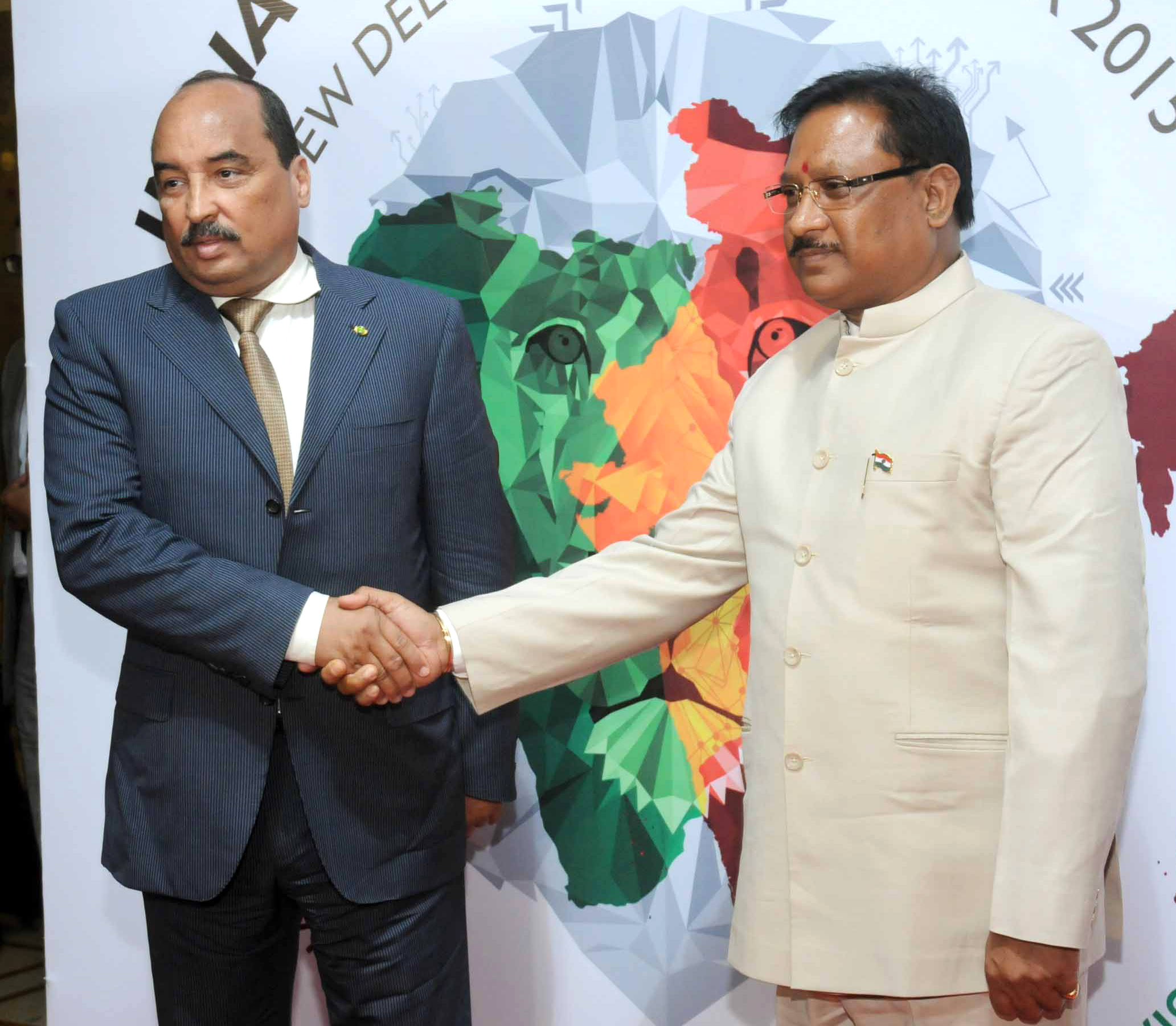
Mohamed with India's Minister of State for Mines and Steel Vishnu Deo Sai in 2015.

Mohamed stood for re-election in 2014, which he won over Biram Dah Abeid, with nearly 82% of the popular vote. After winning the election many opposition parties boycotted the election results. But even though the election was boycotted the African Union praised the elections for taking place relatively peacefully.

A referendum took place in 2017 in which it was split into two questions on different proposed reforms. One covered abolition of the indirectly-elected Senate and its replacement with Regional Councils, as well as merging the Islamic High Council and the national Ombudsman into a 'Supreme Council of the Fatwa'. The other one covered national symbols, including a proposal to change the national flag by adding a red band at the top and bottom to symbolize "the efforts and sacrifices that the people of Mauritania will keep consenting, to the price of their blood, to defend their territory", as well as modifying the national anthem.

Mohamed Ould Mohamed called for Mauritania to root out hate speech as he headed a rally aimed at ending ethnic tensions. He said that he adopted a law in which he cracked down on "hateful, racist or violent speech".

=== Anti-slavery movement ===
Since 2015 many protests were held against slavery in Mauritania, with protestors accusing the government of not implementing an anti-slavery law. Aziz and the Government of Mauritania stated that slavery had not existed in the country since 1981, when it was the last nation to abolish it.

In March 2013, Mohamed established an agency to stop slavery, known as the "National Agency to Fight against the Vestiges of Slavery, Integration, and Fight against Poverty".

== 2019 election ==
Mohamed did not stand for re-election in 2019, and was peacefully succeeded by the winner of the election, at that time his confidant Mohamed Ould Ghazouani.

== Corruption ==
In March 2021, a judge charged Mohamed and 10 other people in his inner circle, including one of his sons-in-law, several former prime ministers, and businessmen, with corruption. One of his lawyers then revealed that Mohamed refused to answer any questions from the judge. On 23 June 2021, a prosecutor speaking on condition of anonymity and the spokesman of the former president's party Djibril Ould Bilal confirmed that a judge transferred Mohamed from house arrest to jail after he refused to cooperate with police.

On 29 December 2021, Mohamed was admitted to Nouakchott Military Hospital where he successfully underwent heart surgery. According to his lawyer, Mohamed had fallen ill and suffered nose bleeds. In a statement, Mohamed's family claimed that the former president's poor health came as a result of the corruption scandal, stating that they "fear for his physical liquidation" by the regime which "failed in its attempts to liquidate him politically." When Mohamed was discharged from the hospital, he was allowed to return on 7 January 2022 to house arrest instead of jail due to his health issues.

On 1 June 2022, the prosecutor ordered the referral of Mohamed to the Criminal Court on charges of corruption, money laundering, and illicit enrichment. The court file estimated the sums embezzled by Mohamed at US$90 million; these assets consisted of 17 houses, 468 plots of land, several herds of sheep, and ougiya banknotes.

In October 2023, a prosecution requested 20 years in prison with confiscation of the property of Mohamed. On 4 December, he was convicted of illicit enrichment and laundering and was sentenced to five years' imprisonment, with his lawyer saying that they would appeal the verdict.

On February 25, 2025, the Attorney General requested on appeal, 20 years in prison against Mohamed Ould Abdel Aziz, accused of embezzlement of public funds and illicit enrichment during his mandate.

On May 14, 2025, a second instance court in Nouakchott sentenced Mohamed Ould Abdelaziz to fifteen years in prison on appeal.

Political offices
Preceded by Sidi Ould Cheikh Abdallahi as President of Mauritania	President of the High Council of State of Mauritania; 2008–2009	Succeeded by Ba Mamadou Mbaré; Acting
Preceded by Ba Mamadou Mbaré; Acting	President of Mauritania; 2009–2019	Succeeded by Mohamed Ould Ghazouani
Diplomatic posts
Preceded by Hailemariam Desalegn	Chairperson of the African Union; 2014–2015	Succeeded by Robert Mugabe
