= List of deposed politicians =

Forcible removal of a politician, monarch, or clergyman

Deposition (or dismissal, termination, expulsion, firing or dropping out) by political means concerns the removal of a politician or monarch. It may be done by coup, impeachment, invasion, or forced abdication. The term may also refer to the official removal of a clergyman, especially a bishop, from ecclesiastical office.

== Deposed head of state or government politicians ==
Year	Politician	Country	Title	Type
81 BCE	Gaius Marius and Lucius Cornelius Cinna	Roman Republic	Consuls	Sulla's civil war
48 BCE	Pompey	Roman Republic	Triumvir	Assassinated by Ptolemy XIII Theos Philopator while attempting to flee to Egypt during Caesar's civil war
44 BCE	Julius Caesar	Roman Republic	Dictator perpetuo	Assassinated at the beginning of the Liberators' civil war
33 BCE	Mark Antony	Roman Republic	Triumvir	War of Actium
1659 CE	Richard Cromwell	Commonwealth of England, Scotland and Ireland	Lord Protector	Stuart Restoration
1840	Pedro de Araújo Lima	Empire of Brazil	Regent of Brazil	Majority Coup
1841	Bento Gonçalves da Silva	Riograndense Republic	President of the Riograndense Republic	Imprisonment during the Ragamuffin War
1852	Juan Manuel de Rosas	Argentine Confederation	17th Governor of Buenos Aires Province, Ruler of Argentina	Brazilian invasion during the Platine War
1861	Sam Houston	Republic of Texas	Governor of Texas	Opposed Texas's secession from the Union and entry into the Confederate States of America during the American Civil War
1863	José Antonio Páez	Venezuela	5th President of Venezuela	
1865	Jefferson Davis	Confederate States of America	President of the Confederate States of America	American Civil War
1871	Mariano Melgarejo	Bolivia	15th President of Bolivia	
1900	Luis Gálvez Rodríguez de Arias	Republic of Acre	President of the Republic of Acre	Coup d'état
1908	Cipriano Castro	Venezuela	President of Venezuela	1908 Venezuelan coup d'état, removed from office while abroad
1911	Porfirio Díaz	Mexico	33rd President of Mexico	Mexican Revolution
1917	Alexander Kerensky	Russian Republic	Minister-President of the Russian Republic	October Revolution
1917, 1926	Bernardino Machado	Portugal	Third and eighth President of Portugal	Coup d'état by Sidónio Pais (1917); Coup d'état by Gomes da Costa (1926)
1930	Washington Luís	Brazil	13th President of Brazil	Revolution of 1930
1930	Júlio Prestes	Brazil	President-elect of Brazil	Revolution of 1930
1938	Kurt Schuschnigg	Austria	Chancellor of Austria	Anschluss
1938	Edvard Beneš	Czechoslovakia	President of Czechoslovakia	Occupation of Czechoslovakia
1939	Manuel Azaña	Spain	Prime Minister of Spain	Spanish Civil War
1940	Paul Reynaud	France	Prime Minister of France	Battle of France
1940	Konstantin Päts	Estonia	1st President of Estonia	Soviet invasion of Estonia
1940	Antanas Smetona	Lithuania	1st President of Lithuania	Soviet invasion of Lithuania
1940	Kārlis Ulmanis	Latvia	4th President of Latvia (self-proclaimed)	Soviet invasion of Latvia
1944, 1945	Benito Mussolini	Italy	Duce	Italian campaign of World War II
1944	Juan Federico Ponce Vaides	Guatemala	President of Guatemala	Guatemalan Revolution
1945	Adolf Hitler	Germany	Führer of Germany	Suicide by Gunshot during World War II
1945	Karl Dönitz	Germany	President of Germany	World War II
1945	Isaías Medina Angarita	Venezuela	President of Venezuela	1945 Venezuelan coup d'état
1945	Getúlio Vargas	Brazil	14th and 17th President of Brazil	1945 Brazilian coup d'état
1947	Ferenc Nagy	Hungary	40th Prime Minister of Hungary, 1st Prime Minister of the Second Hungarian Republic	Coup d'état
1948	Teodoro Picado Michalski	Costa Rica	President of Costa Rica	Costa Rican Civil War
1948	Rómulo Gallegos	Venezuela	President of Venezuela	1948 Venezuelan coup d'état
1953	Mohammad Mosaddegh	Iran	35th Prime Minister of Iran	1953 Iranian coup d'état
1954	Jacobo Árbenz	Guatemala	President of Guatemala	1954 Guatemalan coup d'état
1955	Carlos Luz	Brazil	President of Brazil	Preventative Coup of November 11
1955	Café Filho	Brazil	President of Brazil	Preventative Coup of November 11
1956	Imre Nagy	Hungary	Chairman of the Council of Ministers of the Hungarian People's Republic	Soviet invasion of Hungary
1956	Bolesław Bierut	Poland	General Secretary of the Polish United Workers' Party	Polish October
1958	Marcos Pérez Jiménez	Venezuela	Military dictator of Venezuela	Fled the country during the 1958 Venezuelan coup d'état
1959	Fulgencio Batista	Cuba	14th and 17th President of Cuba	Cuban Revolution
1960	Patrice Lumumba	Congo-Léopoldville	1st President of Congo-Leopoldville	Congo Crisis
1960	Syngman Rhee	South Korea	1st President of South Korea	April Revolution
1963	Nazem al-Qudsi	Syria	President of Syria	1963 Syrian coup d'état
1963	Juan Bosch	Dominican Republic	President of the Dominican Republic	1963 Dominican coup d'état
1963	Ngo Dinh Diem	South Vietnam	President of South Vietnam	1963 South Vietnamese coup
1964	Nikita Khrushchev	Soviet Union	First Secretary of the Communist Party of the Soviet Union	Removed from office
1964	João Goulart	Brazil	24th President of Brazil	1964 Brazilian coup d'état
1966	Kwame Nkrumah	Ghana	1st President of Ghana	1966 Ghanaian coup d'état
1968	Alexander Dubček	Czechoslovakia	First Secretary of the Communist Party of Czechoslovakia	Warsaw Pact invasion of Czechoslovakia
1969	Pedro Aleixo	Brazil	President-designate of Brazil	Removed from the office by the Brazilian Military Junta of 1969
1974	Américo Tomás	Portugal	President of Portugal	Carnation Revolution
1974	Marcelo Caetano	Portugal	Prime Minister of Portugal	Carnation Revolution
1974	Richard Nixon	United States	37th President of the United States	Resigned to avoid removal from office by impeachment process after the Watergate scandal
1975	Gough Whitlam	Australia	21st Prime Minister of Australia	1975 Australian constitutional crisis
1975	Nguyễn Văn Thiệu	South Vietnam	President of South Vietnam	1975 spring offensive
1978	Mohammed Daoud Khan	Afghanistan	1st President of Afghanistan	Saur Revolution
1978	Moktar Ould Daddah	Mauritania	1st President of Mauritania	1978 Mauritanian coup d'état
1979	Idi Amin	Uganda	3rd President of Uganda	Uganda–Tanzania War
1979	Anastasio Somoza Debayle	Nicaragua	President of Nicaragua	Nicaraguan Revolution
1979	Pol Pot	Democratic Kampuchea	General Secretary of the Communist Party of Kampuchea	Cambodian–Vietnamese War
1979	Eric Gairy	Grenada	Premier of Grenada	Removed from office by the New JEWEL Movement
1979	Mustafa Ould Salek	Mauritania	2nd Chairman of the Military Committee for National Recovery	1979 Mauritanian coup d'état
1979	Francisco Macías Nguema	Equatorial Guinea	1st President of Equatorial Guinea	1979 Equatorial Guinea coup d'état
1979	Ian Smith	Rhodesia	Prime Minister of Rhodesia	Rhodesian Bush War
1979	Park Chung Hee	South Korea	3rd President of South Korea	Assassinated by Korean Central Intelligence Agency Director Kim Jae-gyu
1979	Hafizullah Amin	Afghanistan	General Secretary of the People's Democratic Party of Afghanistan	Operation Storm-333
1980	Luís Cabral	Guinea-Bissau	1st President of Guinea-Bissau	1980 Guinea-Bissau coup d'état
1980	Mohamed Mahmoud Ould Louly	Mauritania	3rd Chairman of the Military Committee for National Salvation	1980 Mauritanian coup d'état
1982	Bachir Gemayel	Lebanon	President-elect of Lebanon	Blown up
1983	Hudson Austin	Grenada	Chairman of the Revolutionary Military Council of Grenada	United States invasion of Grenada
1984	Mohamed Khouna Ould Haidalla	Mauritania	4th Chairman of the Military Committee for National Salvation	1984 Mauritanian coup d'état
1986	Jean-Claude Duvalier	Haiti	35th President of Haiti	Anti-Duvalier protest movement
1986	Ferdinand Marcos	Philippines	10th President of the Philippines	People Power Revolution
1987	Habib Bourguiba	Tunisia	1st President of Tunisia	1987 Tunisian coup d'état
1987	Thomas Sankara	Burkina Faso	President of Burkina Faso	1987 Burkina Faso coup d'état
1987	Chun Doo-hwan	South Korea	5th President of South Korea	June Democratic Struggle
1988	Ne Win	Burma	President of Burma	8888 Uprising
1989	Alfredo Stroessner	Paraguay	42nd President of Paraguay	1989 Paraguayan coup d'état
1989	Erich Honecker	East Germany	General Secretary of the Socialist Unity Party of Germany (effective leader of East Germany)	Peaceful Revolution
1989	Miloš Jakeš	Czechoslovakia	General Secretary of the Communist Party of Czechoslovakia	Velvet Revolution
1989	Wojciech Jaruzelski	Poland	President of Poland & First Secretary of the Polish United Workers' Party	Solidarity Movement
1989	Todor Zhivkov	Bulgaria	General Secretary of the Bulgarian Communist Party	Revolutions of 1989
1989	Károly Grósz	Hungary	General Secretary of the Hungarian Socialist Workers' Party	End of communism in Hungary
1989	Manuel Noriega	Panama	Military dictator of Panama from 1983 to 1989	United States invasion of Panama
1989	Nicolae Ceaușescu	Romania	President of Romania	Romanian revolution
1990	Hissène Habré	Chad	5th President of Chad	1990 Chadian coup d'état
1991	Siad Barre	Somalia	3rd President of Somalia	Somali Rebellion
1991	Mengistu Haile Mariam	Ethiopia	1st President of Ethiopia	Forced to flee when the Ethiopian People's Revolutionary Democratic Front began winning the Ethiopian Civil War
1991	Mikhail Gorbachev	Soviet Union	1st President of the Soviet Union	Dissolution of the Soviet Union
1991	Jean-Bertrand Aristide	Haiti	39th President of Haiti	1991 Haitian coup d'état
1992	Zviad Gamsakhurdia	Georgia	1st President of Georgia	1991–1992 Georgian coup d'état
1992	Ayaz Mutallibov	Azerbaijan	1st President of Azerbaijan	Resigned under pressure of the opposition
1992	Mohammad Najibullah	Afghanistan	2nd President of Afghanistan	Afghan Civil War
1992	Joseph Saidu Momoh	Sierra Leone	2nd President of Sierra Leone	Sierra Leone Civil War
1992	Fernando Collor de Mello	Brazil	32nd President of Brazil	Impeachment and resignation
1993	Carlos Andrés Pérez	Venezuela	40th President of Venezuela	Impeachment
1993	Abulfaz Elchibey	Azerbaijan	2nd President of Azerbaijan	1993 Azerbaijani coup d'état
1993, 1999	Nawaz Sharif	Pakistan	12th and 14th Prime Minister of Pakistan	1999 Pakistani coup d'état
1993	Alexander Rutskoy	Russia	Vice President of Russia	1993 Russian constitutional crisis
1994	Juvénal Habyarimana	Rwanda	2nd President of Rwanda	Assassinated by an unknown force before the Arusha Accords ending the Rwandan Civil War went into effect
1997	Mobutu Sese Seko	Zaire	President of Zaire	First Congo War
1998	Suharto	Indonesia	2nd President of Indonesia	Indonesian Revolution of 1998
1999	João Bernardo Vieira	Guinea-Bissau	2nd President of Guinea-Bissau	Guinea-Bissau Civil War
2000	Aslan Maskhadov|	Chechnya	3rd President of Chechnya	Russian invasion
2000	Slobodan Milošević	Yugoslavia	3rd President of the Federal Republic of Yugoslavia	Overthrow of Slobodan Milošević
2001	Laurent-Désiré Kabila	Democratic Republic of the Congo	3rd President of the Democratic Republic of the Congo	Second Congo War
2001	Joseph Estrada	Philippines	14th President of the Philippines	Second EDSA Revolution
2001	Mullah Omar	Islamic Emirate of Afghanistan	Leader of the Islamic Emirate of Afghanistan	United States invasion of Afghanistan
2002	Hugo Chávez	Venezuela	President of Venezuela	2002 Venezuelan coup d'état attempt
2003	Saddam Hussein	Iraq	5th President of Iraq	2003 Invasion of Iraq
2003	Charles Taylor	Liberia	22nd President of Liberia	Second Liberian Civil War
2003	Eduard Shevardnadze	Georgia	1st President of Georgia	Rose Revolution
2003	Kumba Yala	Guinea-Bissau	3rd President of Guinea-Bissau	2003 Guinea-Bissau coup d'état
2004	Rolandas Paksas	Lithuania	3rd President of Lithuania	Impeachment
2005	Lucio Gutiérrez	Ecuador	43rd President of Ecuador	Removed from office
2005	Askar Akayev	Kyrgyzstan	1st President of Kyrgyzstan	Tulip Revolution
2005	Maaouya Ould Sid'Ahmed Taya	Mauritania	5th President of Mauritania	2005 Mauritanian coup d'état
2006	Thaksin Shinawatra	Thailand	31st Prime Minister of Thailand	2006 Thai coup d'état
2008	Sidi Ould Cheikh Abdallahi	Mauritania	8th President of Mauritania	2008 Mauritanian coup d'état
2009	Marc Ravalomanana	Madagascar	5th President of Madagascar	2009 Malagasy political crisis
2009	Manuel Zelaya	Honduras	52nd President of Honduras	2009 Honduran coup d'état
2010	Mamadou Tandja	Niger	7th President of Niger	2010 Nigerien coup d'état
2010	Kurmanbek Bakiyev	Kyrgyzstan	2nd President of Kyrgyzstan	Kyrgyz Revolution of 2010
2011	Zine El Abidine Ben Ali	Tunisia	2nd President of Tunisia	Tunisian Revolution
2011	Hosni Mubarak	Egypt	4th President of Egypt	2011 Egyptian revolution
2011	Muammar Gaddafi	Libya	Brotherly Leader and Guide of the Revolution of Libya	First Libyan Civil War
2012	Ali Abdullah Saleh	Yemen	1st President of Yemen	Yemeni Revolution
2012	Raimundo Pereira	Guinea-Bissau	Acting President of Guinea-Bissau	2012 Guinea-Bissau coup d'état
2013	Mohamed Morsi	Egypt	5th President of Egypt	2013 Egyptian coup d'état
2014	Viktor Yanukovych	Ukraine	4th President of Ukraine	Revolution of Dignity
2014	Yingluck Shinawatra	Thailand	28th Prime Minister of Thailand	2014 Thai coup d'état
2014	Blaise Compaoré	Burkina Faso	2nd President of Burkina Faso	2014 Burkina Faso uprising
2016	Dilma Rousseff	Brazil	36th President of Brazil	Impeachment of Dilma Rousseff
2017	Park Geun-hye	South Korea	11th President of South Korea	Impeachment of Park Geun-hye
2017	Robert Mugabe	Zimbabwe	2nd President of Zimbabwe	2017 Zimbabwean coup d'état
2017	Yahya Jammeh	The Gambia	2nd President of the Gambia	2016–2017 Gambian constitutional crisis
2018	Serzh Sargsyan	Armenia	3rd President of Armenia	2018 Armenian revolution
2019	Abdelaziz Bouteflika	Algeria	7th President of Algeria	2019 Algerian protests
2019	Omar al-Bashir	Sudan	7th President of Sudan	2019 Sudanese coup d'état
2019	Evo Morales	Bolivia	65th President of Bolivia	2019 Bolivian protests
2020	Sooronbay Jeenbekov	Kyrgyzstan	5th President of Kyrgyzstan	2020 Kyrgyz Revolution
2020	Ibrahim Boubacar Keïta	Mali	5th President of Mali	2020 Malian coup d'état
2021	Aung San Suu Kyi	Myanmar	State Counsellor of Myanmar	2021 Myanmar coup d'état
2021	Ashraf Ghani	Afghanistan	5th President of Afghanistan	2021 Taliban offensive
2021	Alpha Condé	Guinea	4th President of Guinea	2021 Guinean coup d'état
2022	Nursultan Nazarbayev	Kazakhstan	Chairman of the Security Council of Kazakhstan	2022 Kazakh unrest
2022	Roch Marc Christian Kaboré	Burkina Faso	3rd President of Burkina Faso	January 2022 Burkina Faso coup d'état
2022	Gotabaya Rajapaksa	Sri Lanka	8th President of Sri Lanka	2022 Sri Lankan political crisis
2022	Imran Khan	Pakistan	22nd Prime Minister of Pakistan	2022 Pakistani constitutional crisis
2022	Paul-Henri Sandaogo Damiba	Burkina Faso	Interim President of Burkina Faso	September 2022 Burkina Faso coup d'état
2022	Pedro Castillo	Peru	63rd President of Peru	2022 Peruvian self-coup d'état attempt
2023	Mohamed Bazoum	Niger	10th President of Niger	2023 Nigerien coup d'état
2023	Ouhoumoudou Mahamadou	Niger	15th Prime Minister of Niger	2023 Nigerien coup d'état
2023	Ali Bongo Ondimba	Gabon	3rd President of Gabon	2023 Gabonese coup d'état
2024	Sheikh Hasina	Bangladesh	10th Prime Minister of Bangladesh	2024 Non-cooperation movement
2024	Bashar al-Assad	Syria	19th President of Syria	2024 Syrian opposition offensives
2024	Yoon Suk Yeol	South Korea	13th President of South Korea	Impeachment due to enacting martial law
2025	Paetongtarn Shinawatra	Thailand	31st Prime Minister of Thailand	2025 Thai political crisis
2025	K. P. Sharma Oli	Nepal	38th Prime Minister of Nepal	2025 Nepalese Gen Z protests
2025	Christian Ntsay	Madagascar	28th Prime Minister of Madagascar	2025 Malagasy protests
2025	Dina Boluarte	Peru	64th President of Peru	Impeachment
2025	Andry Rajoelina	Madagascar	8th President of Madagascar	2025 Malagasy coup d'état
2025	Umaro Sissoco Embaló	Guinea-Bissau	6th President of Guinea-Bissau	2025 Guinea-Bissau coup d'état
2026	Nicolás Maduro	Venezuela	President of Venezuela	Ousted by the United States Armed Forces during intervention in Venezuela
2026	José Jerí	Peru	65th President of Peru	Vote of no confidence
2026	Ali Khamenei	Iran	Supreme Leader of Iran	Assassinated by the Israeli Air Force during the 2026 Iran war

== Deposed head of state or government monarchs ==
Year	Monarch	Country	Title	Type
587 BCE	Zedekiah	Kingdom of Judah	King of Judah	Fall of Jerusalem
539 BCE	Nabonidus	Neo-Babylonian Empire	King of the Neo-Babylonian Empire	Fall of Babylon
331 BCE	Darius III	Achaemenid Empire	King of Kings	Battle of Gaugamela
320 BCE	Perdiccas	Macedonian Empire	Regent of Macedonia	First War of the Diadochi
207 BCE	Qin Er Shi	Qin dynasty	Emperor of China	Fall of the Qin
316 BCE	Olympias	Macedonia	Queen of Macedonia	Second War of the Diadochi
310 BCE	Alexander IV of Macedon and Roxana	Macedonia	King and Queen of Macedon	Assassinated by Cassander during the Third War of the Diadochi
168 BCE	Perseus of Macedon	Macedonia	Basileus of Macedonia	Third Macedonian War
63 BCE	Mithridates IV of Pontus	Kingdom of Pontus	King of Pontus	Third Mithridatic War
47 BCE	Ptolemy XIII Theos Philopator	Ptolemaic Kingdom of Egypt	Pharaoh of Egypt	Alexandrian war
30 BCE	Cleopatra	Ptolemaic Kingdom of Egypt	Queen of the Ptolemaic Kingdom of Egypt	War of Actium
41 CE	Caligula	Roman Empire	Roman emperor	Assassinated by the Praetorian Guard and the Roman Senate in favor of his uncle Claudius and attempted abolition of the Principate
68	Nero	Roman Empire	Roman emperor	Outlawed and killed during rebellion by Gaius Julius Vindex
69	Galba	Roman Empire	Roman emperor	Assassinated by the Praetorian Guard during the Year of the Four Emperors
69	Otho	Roman Empire	Roman emperor	Defeated by Vitellius at the First Battle of Bedriacum
69	Vitellius	Roman Empire	Roman emperor	Defeated by Vespasian at the Second Battle of Bedriacum
193	Commodus	Roman Empire	Roman emperor	Assassinated at the beginning of the Year of the Five Emperors
193	Pertinax	Roman Empire	Roman emperor	Assassinated by the Praetorian Guard during the Year of the Five Emperors
193	Didius Julianus	Roman Empire	Roman emperor	Assassinated in revolt by Septimius Severus during the Year of the Five Emperors
193	Pescennius Niger	Roman Empire	Roman emperor	Killed by the Imperial Roman army while retreating from Antioch
197	Clodius Albinus	Roman Empire	Roman emperor	Claim to the emperorship defeated during the Year of the Five Emperors, decisively defeated at the Battle of Lugdunum
220	Emperor Xian of Han	Han dynasty	Emperor of China	End of the Han dynasty
235	Severus Alexander	Roman Empire	Roman emperor	Assassinated by the Imperial Roman army at the beginning of the Crisis of the Third Century
238	Maximinus Thrax	Roman Empire	Roman emperor	Assassinated by the Legio II Parthica during the siege of Aquilea
238	Gordian I	Roman Empire	Roman emperor	Committed suicide after defeat of his forces at the Battle of Carthage
238	Gordian II	Roman Empire	Co-emperor	Killed at the Battle of Carthage
238	Pupienus	Roman Empire	Roman emperor	Assassinated by Balbinus during the Year of the Six Emperors
238	Balbinus	Roman Empire	Roman emperor	Assassinated by the Praetorian Guard during the Year of the Six Emperors
249	Cao Shuang	Cao Wei	Regent of Cao Wei	Incident at the Gaoping Tombs
251	Decius and Herennius Etruscus	Roman Empire	Roman emperors	Gothic War
260	Valerian I	Roman Empire	Roman emperor	Battle of Edessa
307	Severus II	Roman Empire	Roman emperor	Civil wars of the Tetrarchy
312	Maxentius	Roman Empire	Roman emperor	Battle of the Milvian Bridge
324	Valens	Roman Empire	Eastern Roman emperor	Battle of Adrianople
475	Julius Nepos	Western Roman Empire	Western Roman emperor	Defeated in rebellion by Orestes
476	Romulus Augustulus	Western Roman Empire	Western Roman emperor	Fall of the Western Roman Empire
493	Odoacer	Kingdom of Italy	King of Italy	Killed by Theodoric the Great during the Ostrogothic conquest of Italy
626	Emperor Gaozong of Tang	Tang dynasty	Emperor of China	Xuanwu Gate Incident
628	Khosrow II	Sasanian Empire	King of Kings	Sasanian civil war of 628–632
649	Emperor Taizong of Tang	Tang dynasty	Emperor of China	Transition from Sui to Tang
652	Yazdegerd III	Sasanian Empire	King of Kings	Muslim conquest of Persia
695	Justinian II	Roman Empire	Roman Emperor	Justinian II
705	Wu Zetian	Zhou dynasty	Empress of China	Coup d'état by Emperor Zhongzong of Tang
960	Guo Zongxun	Later Zhou dynasty	Emperor of China	Coup at Chen Bridge
1013	Æthelred the Unready	England	King of England	Overthrown by Danish invasion
1126	Emperor Qinzong	Northern Song dynasty	Emperor of China	Jingkang incident
1167	Diarmaid mac Murchadha	Kingdom of Leinster	King of Leinster	Deposed by the Irish High King Ruaidrí Ua Conchobair for allegations that he had kidnapped Derbforgaill ingen Maeleachlainn
1206	Alexios IV Angelos and Alexios V Doukas	Byzantine Empire	Eastern Roman emperor	Fourth Crusade
1248	Sancho II of Portugal	Portugal	King of Portugal	Deposed by Pope Innocent IV in the bull Grandi non immerito
1279	Zhao Bing	Southern Song dynasty	Emperor of China	Mongol conquest of China
1298	Adolf, King of the Romans	Holy Roman Empire	King of the Romans	Deposed by prince-electors of the Holy Roman Empire
1327	Edward II of England	England	King of England	Forced to abdicate by Parliament of 1327
1370	Toghon Temür	Yuan dynasty	Emperor of China	Red Turban Rebellions
1399	Richard II of England	England	King of England	Invasion of England by Henry Bolingbroke
1400	Wenceslaus, King of the Romans	Holy Roman Empire	King of the Romans	Deposed by Sigismund of Luxembourg in favor of Rupert III
1453	Constantine XI Palaiologos	Byzantine Empire	Eastern Roman emperor	Fall of Constantinople, conquest of the former Byzantine Empire by the Ottoman Empire
1461	Henry VI of England	England	King of England	Wars of the Roses
1470	Edward IV of England	England	King of England	Wars of the Roses
1483	Edward V of England	England	King of England	Abducted to the Tower of London during the Wars of the Roses
1532	Huáscar	Inca Empire	Sapa Inca	Inca Civil War
1533	Atahualpa	Inca Empire	Sapa Inca	Spanish conquest of the Inca Empire
1567	Mary, Queen of Scots	Scotland	Queen of Scotland	
1568	Eric XIV	Sweden	King of Sweden	Uprising against Erik XIV
1572	Túpac Amaru	Neo-Inca State	Sapa Inca	
1623	Gwanghaegun of Joseon	Joseon	Korean Emperor	Overthrown by the Westerner faction in favor of Injo of Joseon
1640	Philip III of Portugal	Portugal Kingdom of the Algarve	King of Portugal King of the Algarve	Portuguese Restoration War
1644	Chongzhen Emperor	Ming dynasty	Emperor of China	Late Ming peasant rebellions
1645	Li Zicheng	Shun dynasty	Emperor of China	Transition from Ming to Qing
1649	Charles I of England	England; Scotland	King of England King of ScotlandKing of Ireland	English Civil War
1688	James II of England	England; Scotland; Ireland	King of England; King of Scotland; King of Ireland	Glorious Revolution
1695	Zumbi dos Palmares	Palmares	King of Palmares	
1735	Stanisław Leszczyński	Polish–Lithuanian Commonwealth	King of Poland and Grand Duke of Lithuania	War of the Polish Succession
1790	Maria Christina and Albert Casimir	Austrian Netherlands	Governor of the Austrian Netherlands	Brabant Revolution
1792	Louis XVI	France	King of France	French Revolution
1795	Stanisław August Poniatowski	Polish–Lithuanian Commonwealth	King of Poland and Grand Duke of Lithuania	Third Partition of Poland
1806	Francis II	Holy Roman Empire	Holy Roman Emperor	Dissolution of the Holy Roman Empire at the end of the War of the Third Coalition, remained Emperor of Austria
1807	Selim III	Ottoman Empire	Sultan of the Ottoman Empire	Ottoman coups of 1807–1808
1808	Mustafa IV	Ottoman Empire	Sultan of the Ottoman Empire	Ottoman coups of 1807–1808
1809	Gustav IV Adolf	Sweden	King of Sweden	Finnish War and Coup of 1809
1810	Ferdinand VII of Spain	Spanish Empire	King of Spain and the Indies	Forced to abdicate by Napoleon at the beginning of the Peninsular War, which also led to the Spanish American wars of independence in which Spain lost most of its colonies
1814	Christian Frederick	Denmark–Norway	King of Norway	Swedish–Norwegian War (1814)
1814-15	Napoleon I	France	Emperor of the French	Exiled to Elba after defeat in the War of the Sixth Coalition, returned and restored control of France but was defeated again in the Battle of Waterloo and exiled in Saint Helena
1815	Louis XVIII	Kingdom of France	King of France	Briefly deposed in Napoleon's Hundred Days
1823	Augustin I of Mexico	Mexico	Emperor of Mexico	Casa Mata Plan Revolution
1830	Charles X	Kingdom of France	King of France	July Revolution
1834	Miguel I	Portugal	King of Portugal	Liberal Wars
1848	Louis Philippe I	France	French Revolution of 1848	
1858	Bahadur Shah Zafar	Mughal Empire	Mughal emperor	British defeat of the Indian Rebellion of 1857
1864	Christian IX of Denmark	Duchy of Schleswig Duchy of Holstein Duchy of Saxe-Lauenburg	Duke of Schleswig Duke of Holstein Duke of Lauenberg	Second Schleswig War
1866	Franz Joseph I of Austria	German Confederation	President of the German Confederation	Austro-Prussian War
1866	George V of Hanover	Hanover	King of Hanover	Austro-Prussian War
1866	Frederick William, Elector of Hesse	Hesse	Elector of Hesse	Austro-Prussian War
1866	Adolphe, Grand Duke of Luxembourg	Nassau	Duke of Nassau	Austro-Prussian War
1867	Maximilian I of Mexico	Mexico	Emperor of Mexico	Defeat of Second French intervention in Mexico
1868	Isabella II of Spain	Spain	Queen of Spain	Glorious Revolution (Spain)
1871	Napoleon III	Second French Empire	Emperor of the French	Franco-Prussian War
1889	Pedro II of Brazil	Empire of Brazil	Emperor of Brazil	Decline and fall of Pedro II of Brazil
1893	Liliʻuokalani	Hawaii	Queen of the Hawaiian Islands	Overthrow of the Hawaiian Kingdom
1896	Frederick William Koko Mingi VIII of Nembe	Nembe Kingdom	King of Nembe	Deposed by the British Empire
1898	Guangxu Emperor	China	Emperor of China	Defeat of Hundred Days' Reform
1908	Abdul Hamid II	Ottoman Empire	Sultan of the Ottoman Empire	Young Turk Revolution
1910	Manuel II	Portugal	King of Portugal	5 October 1910 revolution
1912	Puyi	China	Emperor of China	1911 Revolution
1914	Peter I	Serbia	King of Serbia	Serbian campaign of World War I
1917	Nicholas II	Russia	Emperor of all the Russias	February Revolution
1918	Charles I	Austria-Hungary	Emperor of Austria and King of Hungary	Dissolution of Austria-Hungary as a result of World War I
1918	Wilhelm II	Germany	German Emperor	German Revolution of 1918–1919
1922	Mehmed VI	Ottoman Empire	Sultan of the Ottoman Empire	Dissolution of the Ottoman Empire during the Turkish War of Independence
1931	Alfonso XIII	Spain	King of Spain	Abdicated after the monarchists were overwhelmingly defeated in the 1931 Spanish local elections
1939	Zog I	Albanian Kingdom	King of Albania	Italian invasion of Albania
1940	Charlotte	Luxembourg	Grand Duchess of Luxembourg	German invasion of Luxembourg
1940	Wilhelmina	Netherlands	Queen of the Netherlands	German invasion of the Netherlands
1941	Reza Shah	Iran	Shah of Iran	Anglo-Soviet invasion of Iran
1941	George II	Greece	King of Greece	German invasion of Greece
1947	George VI	British Raj	Emperor of India	Independence of India
1947	Michael I	Romania	King of Romania	Soviet occupation of Romania
1952	Farouk	Egypt	King of Egypt	Egyptian revolution of 1952
1958	Faisal II	Iraq	King of Iraq	14 July Revolution
1962	Muhammad al-Badr	North Yemen	King and Imam of Yemen	North Yemen Civil War
1964	Jamshid bin Abdullah	Zanzibar	Sultan of Zanzibar	Zanzibar Revolution
1967	Constantine II	Greece	King of Greece	1967 Greek counter-coup
1969	Idris	Libya	King of Libya	1969 Libyan coup d'état
1973	Mohammed Zahir Shah	Afghanistan	King of Afghanistan	1973 Afghan coup d'état
1974	Haile Selassie	Ethiopia	Emperor of Ethiopia	1974 Ethiopian coup d'état
1975	Sisavang Vatthana	Laos	King of Laos	Laotian Civil War
1979	Mohammad Reza Pahlavi	Imperial State of Iran	Shah of Iran	Iranian Revolution
1987	Elizabeth II	Fiji	Queen of Fiji	Fijian monarchy abolished after the 1987 Fijian coups d'état
2008	Gyanendra	Nepal	King of Nepal	2006 Nepalese revolution and abolition by Nepalese Constituent Assembly

== Deposed politicians and monarchs at subnational level ==
Year	Politician	Division	Country	Title	Type
1660	Salvador de Sá	Captaincy of Rio de Janeiro	State of Brazil Portugal	Governor of the Captaincy of Rio de Janeiro	Cachaça revolt
1662	Frederick Coyett	Governorate of Formosa	Dutch Republic	Governor of Formosa	Siege of Fort Zeelandia
1666	Jerônimo de Mendonça Furtado	Captaincy of Pernambuco	State of Brazil Portugal	Governor of the Captaincy of Pernambuco	Imprisonment during the Conjuration of Our Father
1789	César-Constantin-François de Hoensbroeck	Prince-Bishopric of Liège	Holy Roman Empire	Prince-Bishop of Liège	Liège Revolution
1870	William Woods Holden	North Carolina	United States	Governor of North Carolina	Impeachment
1871	David Butler	Nebraska	United States	Governor of Nebraska	Impeachment
1913	William Sulzer	New York (state)	United States	Governor of New York	Impeachment
1917	James Edward Ferguson	Texas	United States	Governor of Texas	Impeachment
1923	Jack Walton	Oklahoma	United States	Governor of Oklahoma	Impeachment
1929	Henry Simpson Johnston	Oklahoma	United States	Governor of Oklahoma	Impeachment
1930	João Pessoa	Paraíba	Brazil	Governor of Paraíba	Assassinated
1988	Evan Mecham	Arizona	United States	Governor of Arizona	Impeachment
1992	Edmundo Pinto	Acre	Brazil	Governor of Acre	Assassinated
2005	Diepreye Alamieyeseigha	Bayelsa State	Nigeria	Governor of Bayelsa State	Impeachment
2006	Rasheed Ladoja	Oyo State	Nigeria	Governor of Oyo State	Impeachment
2006	Ayo Fayose	Ekiti State	Nigeria	Governor of Ekiti State	Impeachment
2006	Joshua Dariye	Plateau State	Nigeria	Governor of Plateau State	Impeachment
2006	Peter Obi	Anambra State	Nigeria	Governor of Anambra State	Impeachment
2009	Rod Blagojevich	Illinois	United States	Governor of Illinois	Impeachment and removed from the office
2009	Marcelo Miranda	Tocantins	Brazil	Governor of Tocantins	Removed from the office by the Superior Electoral Court
2014	Murtala Nyako	Adamawa State	Nigeria	Governor of Adamawa State	Impeachment
2020	Wilson Witzel	Rio de Janeiro	Brazil	Governor of Rio de Janeiro	Impeachment of Wilson Witzel

== Deposed politicians at local level ==
Year	Politician	Place	Division	Country	Title	Type
1865	Philip Tomppert	Louisville	Kentucky	United States	Mayor of Louisville	Impeachment
1916	Frank M. Wooden	Tulsa	Oklahoma	United States	Mayor of Tulsa	Impeachment
1964	Pelópidas da Silveira	Recife	Pernambuco	Brazil	Mayor of Recife	Imprisonment during the 1964 Brazilian coup d'état
1965	Edgard Grecco	Mauá	São Paulo	Brazil	Mayor of Mauá	Impeachment
2011	Hélio de Oliveira Santos	Campinas	São Paulo	Brazil	Mayor of Campinas	Impeachment
2011	Demétrio Vilagra	Campinas	São Paulo	Brazil	Mayor of Campinas	Impeachment
2015	Juan Rosario Mazzone	El Bordo	Salta	Argentina	Mayor of El Bordo	Impeachment
2022	Jorge Muñoz Wells	Lima	Lima	Peru	Mayor of Lima	Impeachment
2024	Alice Guo	Bamban	Pampanga	Philippines	Mayor of Bamban	Dismissal by Ombudsman

== Notable deposed bishops ==
- Cyril of Alexandria
- Cyril Lucaris
- John Chrysostom
- Nestorius
- Photios I of Constantinople
- Antipope Benedict XIII
- Antipope John XXIII
- The Nine Bishops of the Nonjuring Schism
- Robert Duncan, VII Bishop of Pittsburgh
- Mark Lawrence, XIV Bishop of South Carolina
- John-David Schofield, IV Bishop of San Joaquin

== See also ==
- Coup d'état
- Defrocking
- Motion of no confidence
