= Timeline of Nouakchott =

The following is a timeline of the history of the city of Nouakchott, Mauritania.

== 20th century ==
- 1903 - French military outpost built.
- 1908 - Military outpost abandoned.
- 1929 - French military outpost reactivated.
- 1952 - Rosso-Nouakchott highway constructed.
- 1958:
  - Nouakchott site designated new capital of Mauritania; building of city begins.
  - Radio de Mauritanie begins broadcasting.
- 1960:
  - Capital of newly independent Mauritania moved to Nouakchott from Saint Louis.
  - AS Garde Nationale (football club) formed.
  - Palais de Justice (courthouse) built.
- 1961:
  - National Institute of Advanced Islamic Studies built.
  - Population: 5,807.
- 1965 - Population: 15,000 (estimate).
- 1966 - National School of Administration built.
- 1968 - Racial unrest.
- 1970:
  - École normale supérieure de Nouakchott (school) founded.
  - Population: 25,000.
- 1973 - ASC Police (football club) formed.
- 1974:
  - Refugees from drought settle in Ksar Gadid.
  - 5th and 6th arrondissements created.
- 1975:
  - 25 miles of city streets were paved. Streetlights were installed and bus service started.
  - Convention center constructed near city.
  - Population: 104,054 (of which 54,000 living in shanty towns).
- 1976:
  - June: City besieged by guerrilla Polisario Front forces.
  - Espoirs Nouakchott football club formed.
- 1977:
  - July: City besieged by guerrilla Polisario Front forces again.
  - Population: 134,704 (of which 81,467 living in shanty towns).
- 1978:
  - Coup d'état. Overthrow of long-time President Moktar Ould Daddah.
  - ACS Ksar (football club) formed.
- 1979 - ASAC Concorde (football club) formed.
- 1980 - ASC Nasr Zem Zem (football club) formed.
- 1981:
  - Coup attempted and suppressed.
  - University of Nouakchott established.
  - National Archives, and National Library built.
  - Population: at least 232,000.
- 1983 - Stade Olympique (stadium) opens.
- 1984 - Coup d'état. Overthrow of President Mohamed Khouna Ould Haidalla.
- 1986 - Friendship Port of Nouakchott opens.
- 1987 - Racial unrest.
- 1988 - Population: 393,325.
- 1989 - Curfew imposed in city after regional ethnic unrest.
- 1991 - 1 June: Windstorm.
- 1994 - Le Calame newspaper begins publication.
- 1995:
  - "Bread riot" occurs.
  - Al-Akhbar and Nouakchott Info newspapers begin publication.
- 1996 - Coup attempted and suppressed.
- 1999 - Grands moulins de Mauritanie in business.
- 2000 - Population: 558,195.

== 21st century ==
- 2003 - June: Coup attempted and completely suppressed after two days of heavy fighting.
- 2004 - Plague of locusts.
- 2005:
  - June: Anti-government protest.
  - 3 August: 2005 Mauritanian coup d'état. Overthrow of long-time President Maaouya Ould Sid'Ahmed Taya.
- 2008 - Population: 846,871 (estimate).
- 2011:
  - January: 2011–12 Mauritanian protests begin.
  - 2 February: "Al Qaeda suspects killed in a car blast."
  - École supérieure polytechnique de Nouakchott (school) established.
- 2012 - 12 July: Airplane crash occurs at Nouakchott International Airport.
- 2013 - Population: 958,399.
- 2014:
  - March: Protest over Holy Koran desecration.
  - Maty Mint Hamady becomes mayor of the city.
  - Administrative regions Nouakchott-Nord, Nouakchott-Ouest, and Nouakchott-Sud created.
- 2016:
  - Nouakchott–Oumtounsy International Airport opens, Nouakchott International Airport closes.
  - June: 2016 Arab League summit held in Nouakchott.

== See also ==
- Nouakchott history (de)

== Bibliography ==
in English

- Serge Theunynck (1983), Brian Brace Taylor (ed.), "A Sterilizing Capital: Nouakchott", Reading the Contemporary African City, Singapore – via ArchNet
- Paul Tiyambe Zeleza; Dickson Eyoh, eds. (2003). "Nouakchott, Mauritania". Encyclopedia of Twentieth-Century African History. Routledge. ISBN 0415234794.
- Nicola Pratt (2008), "Nouakchott", in Bruce E. Stanley; Michael R.T. Dumper (eds.), Cities of the Middle East and North Africa, Santa Barbara, USA: ABC-CLIO, ISBN 9781576079195
- Christian Vium (11 February 2016), "Eye of the drought: high and dry in the Sahara – in pictures", Guardian, UK (Photos of Nouakchott)
- "'The best solution? Move the Mauritanian capital': water on the rise in Nouakchott", Guardian, UK, 25 July 2016

in French

- Jean-Robert Pitte [in French] (1977), Nouakchott, capitale de la Mauritanie (in French), Université de Paris IV
- Isyakha Diagana (1993). Croissance urbaine et dynamique spatiale à Nouakchott (PhD) (in French). Lumière University Lyon 2.
- Philippe Tanguy (2003). "L'urbanisation irrégulière à Nouakchott: 1960-2000". Insaniyat (in French). 22. Algeria: Centre de recherche en anthropologie sociale et culturelle. ISSN 2253-0738 – via Revues.org.
- Armelle Choplin (2006). "Le foncier urbain en Afrique: entre informel et rationnel, l'exemple de Nouakchott (Mauritanie)" [Urban land in Africa: between the informal and the rational, the Nouakchott case]. Annales de géographie (in French). 115 (647): 69–91. doi:10.3406/geo.2006.21315. S2CID 192197599 – via Persee.fr.
- Anne-Marie Frérot (2006). "Nouakchott, du puits nomade à la ville des pétroliers. Risques et représentations". Maghreb-Machrek (in French) (190).
- Armelle Choplin; Ciavolella Riccardo (2008). "Marges de la ville en marge du politique? Exclusion, dépendance et quête d'autonomie à Nouakchott (Mauritanie)". Autrepart (in French). doi:10.3917/autr.045.0073. ISSN 1278-3986 – via Cairn.info.
- Armelle Choplin (2009). Nouakchott: au carrefour de la Mauritanie et du monde (in French). Paris: Éditions Karthala. ISBN 978-2-8111-3166-1.

== Images ==
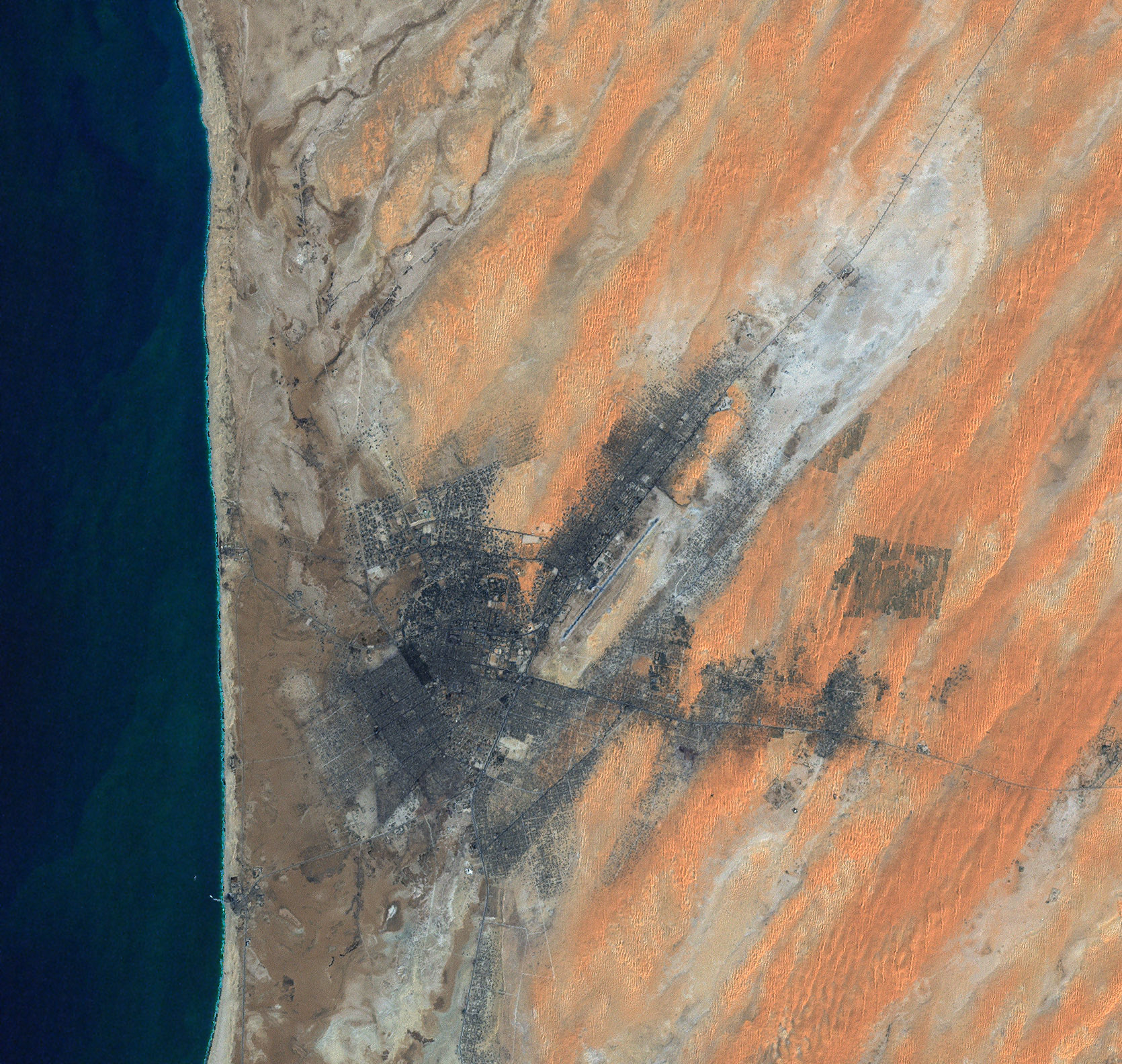
Satellite view of Nouakchott, 2001.

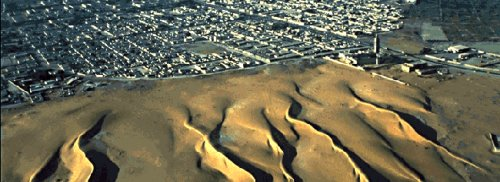
Nouakchott and sand dunes, circa 2002.
