= 1981 Mauritanian coup attempt =

1981 military coup attempt in Mauritania

1981 Mauritanian coup d'état attempt
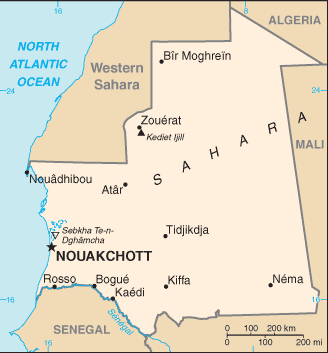
- A CIA WFB map of Mauritania
- Date: 16 March 1981
- Location: Nouakchott, Mauritania
- Type: Military coup
- Motive: Regime change
- Target: Presidential Palace, Nouakchott
- Organised by: Ahmed Salim Ould Sidi; Mohamed Abdelkader
- Participants: Faction within the Armed Forces / AMD movement
- Outcome: Coup fails: Mohamed Khouna Ould Haidalla and CMSN remains in power.

The 1981 Mauritanian coup attempt was a violent coup attempt in Mauritania which took place on 16 March 1981.

The coup attempt, staged by elements of the military and opposition Alliance for a Democratic Mauritania (AMD) movement, was led by Lieutenant-Colonel Ahmed Salim Ould Sidi and Lieutenant-Colonel Mohamed Abdelkader, and resulted in heavy fighting in the capital Nouakchott, before conspirators were defeated by troops loyal to the Head of State (CMSN chairman), Colonel Mohamed Khouna Ould Haidalla.

Abdelkader (former Air Force commander) and Sidi (former CMSN Vice-chairman) were both subsequently executed after the coup attempt.

On 25 April, Haidalla and the CMSN decided to replace the fledgling civilian government of Sid'Ahmed Ould Bneijara (appointed on 12 December 1980) with a six-member military government headed by Colonel Maaouya Ould Sid'Ahmed Taya.
