= Ahmed Salim Ould Sidi =

Mauritanian military officer

- أحمد سالم ولد سيدي

Prime Minister of Mauritania Acting
- In office 28 May 1979 – 31 May 1979
- President: Mustafa Ould Salek
- Preceded by: Ahmed Ould Bouceif
- Succeeded by: Mohamed Khouna Ould Haidalla

Personal details
- Born: 1939
- Died: 26 March 1981 (aged 41–42)

Military service
- Battles/wars: Western Sahara War

Ahmed Salim Ould Sidi (Arabic: أحمد سالم ولد سيدي, 1939 – 26 March 1981) was a Mauritanian military officer and political leader and acting Prime Minister of Mauritania between 28 and 31 May 1979.

== Biography ==
He took part in the coup d'état that overthrew Mustafa Ould Salek and helped Ahmed Ould Bouceif to become the Prime Minister.

After Ould Bouceif died in an airplane crash on 27 May 1979, Ould Sidi temporarily took his place (only for 3 days). On 31 May 1979, Mohamed Khouna Ould Haidalla replaced him and started to gather all political power in his hands. Ould Sidi remained Vice-president and Chief of Military Committee for National Salvation (CMSN) until the beginning of 1980, when Ould Haidalla eliminated all potential counter candidates. Soon he joined the Alliance for a Democratic Mauritania (AMD), connected to former President Moktar Ould Daddah.

On 16 March 1981, he staged a coup attempt against Mohamed Khouna with the help of Mohamed Ould Abdelkader, former Air Force Commander. The coup failed and encouraged the President to take a harder course and abandon civil rule. Both Ould Sidi and Ould Abdelkader were executed by firing squad soon after the failed coup.

Political offices
Preceded by Ahmed Ould Bouceif	Prime Minister of Mauritania; Acting; 1979	Succeeded by Mohamed Khouna Ould Haidalla
