= List of heads of state of Mauritania =

President of the Islamic Republic of Mauritania
- رئيس الجمهورية الإسلامية الموريتانية (Arabic); Président de la République Islamique de la Mauritanie (French)
- Seal of Mauritania

- Presidential standard

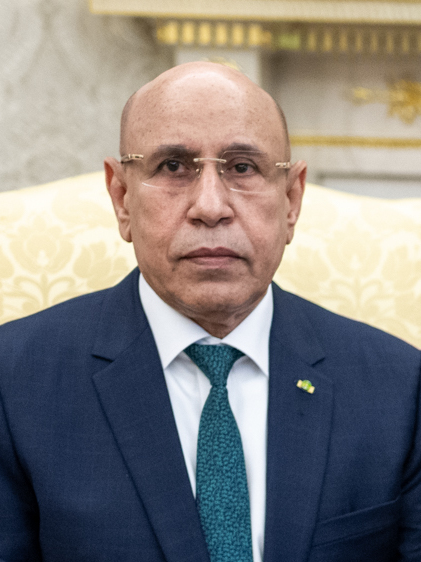
- Incumbent; Mohamed Ould Ghazouani since 1 August 2019
- Residence: Presidential Palace
- Seat: Nouakchott
- Term length: Five years, renewable once
- Constituting instrument: Constitution of Mauritania (1991)
- Inaugural holder: Moktar Ould Daddah
- Formation: 20 August 1961; 65 years ago
- Salary: US$300,000 annually
- Website: presidence.mr

This is a list of heads of state of Mauritania since the country gained independence from France in 1960 to the present day. The head of state is also the commander-in-chief of the armed forces.

A total of nine people have served as head of state of Mauritania (not counting one acting president). Additionally, one person, Mohamed Ould Abdel Aziz, has served on two non-consecutive occasions.

The current head of state of Mauritania is President Mohamed Ould Ghazouani, since 1 August 2019.

== Term limits ==
As of 2024, there is a two-term limit for the president in the Constitution of Mauritania. The first president who adhered to the term limits was Mohamed Ould Abdel Aziz in 2019.

== Titles ==
- 1960–1961: Acting Head of State
- 1961–1978: President of the Islamic Republic
- 1978–1979: Chairman of the Military Committee for National Recovery
- 1979: Head of State and Chairman of the Military Committee for National Recovery
- 1979–1992: Head of State and Chairman of the Military Committee for National Salvation
- 1992–2005: President of the Islamic Republic
- 2005–2007: Chairman of the Military Council for Justice and Democracy
- 2007–2008: President of the Islamic Republic
- 2008–2009: President of the High Council of State
- 2009–present: President of the Islamic Republic

== List of officeholders ==
Political parties

Mauritanian Regroupment Party (PRM)
Mauritanian People's Party (PPM)
Democratic and Social Republican Party (PRDS)
National Pact for Democracy and Development (ADIL)
Union for the Republic (UPR)
El Insaf

Other factions

Military
Independent

Status

Acting President

No.	Portrait	Name (Birth–Death)	Elected	Term of office			Political party	Prime minister(s)
No.	Portrait	Name (Birth–Death)	Elected	Took office	Left office	Time in office	Political party	Prime minister(s)
1		Moktar Ould Daddah (1924–2003)	1961; 1966; 1971; 1976	28 November 1960	10 July 1978 (Deposed in a coup)	17 years, 224 days	PRM / PPM	Himself
2		Mustafa Ould Salek (1936–2012)	—	10 July 1978	3 June 1979 (Resigned) (Note: Resigned in the aftermath of the 1979 coup d'état.)	328 days	Military	Bouceif; Sidi; Haidalla
3		Mohamed Mahmoud Ould Louly (1943–2019)	—	3 June 1979	4 January 1980 (Deposed in a coup)	215 days	Military	Haidalla
4		Mohamed Khouna Ould Haidalla (born 1940)	—	4 January 1980	12 December 1984 (Deposed in a coup)	4 years, 343 days	Military	Himself; Bneijara; Taya; Himself
5		Maaouya Ould Sid'Ahmed Taya (born 1941)	1992; 1997; 2003	12 December 1984	3 August 2005 (Deposed in a coup)	20 years, 234 days	Military / PRDS	Himself; Boubacar; Khouna; Guig; Khouna; M'Bareck
6		Ely Ould Mohamed Vall (1953–2017)	—	3 August 2005	19 April 2007	1 year, 259 days	Military (Sûreté Nationale)	Boubacar
7		Sidi Ould Cheikh Abdallahi (1938–2020)	2007	19 April 2007	6 August 2008 (Deposed in a coup)	1 year, 109 days	Independent	Zeidane; Waghef
7		Sidi Ould Cheikh Abdallahi (1938–2020)	2007	19 April 2007	6 August 2008 (Deposed in a coup)	1 year, 109 days	ADIL (Note: Founded on 28 August 2007 as a political alliance and as a political party on 5 January 2008.)	Zeidane; Waghef
8		Mohamed Ould Abdel Aziz (born 1956)	—	6 August 2008	15 April 2009	252 days	Military (BASEP)	Laghdaf
–		Ba Mamadou Mbaré (1946–2013) (Note: Simultaneously served as the President of the Senate. The first black leader of Mauritania.)	—	15 April 2009	5 August 2009	112 days	Independent	Laghdaf
–		Ba Mamadou Mbaré (1946–2013)	—	15 April 2009	5 August 2009	112 days	UPR (Note: Founded on 5 May 2009.)	Laghdaf
(8)		Mohamed Ould Abdel Aziz (born 1956) (Note: Moulaye Ould Mohamed Laghdaf and Mohamed Ould Ghazouani took over some presidential duties from 14 October 2012 until 24 November 2012 after Mohamed got wounded in an asssassination attempt.)	2009; 2014	5 August 2009	1 August 2019	9 years, 361 days	UPR	Laghdaf; Hademine; Béchir
9		Mohamed Ould Ghazouani (born 1956)	2019; 2024	1 August 2019	Incumbent	7 years, 101 days	UPR	Béchir; Sidiya; Bilal; Djay
9		Mohamed Ould Ghazouani (born 1956)	2019; 2024	1 August 2019	Incumbent	7 years, 101 days	El Insaf (Note: Founded in 2022.)	Béchir; Sidiya; Bilal; Djay

== Latest election ==
Candidate	Party	Votes	%
Mohamed Cheikh Ghazouani	El Insaf	554,956	56.12
Biram Dah Abeid	Democratic Alternation Pole	218,546	22.10
Hamadi Sid’El Moctar Mohamed Abdi	National Rally for Reform and Development	126,340	12.78
El Id Mohameden M’Bareck	Republican Front for Unity and Democracy	35,288	3.57
Mamadou Bocar Ba	Alliance for Justice and Democracy/Movement for Renewal	23,617	2.39
Outouma Antoine Souleimane Soumaré	Independent	20,360	2.06
Mohamed Lemine El Mourteji El Wavi	Independent	9,722	0.98
Total		988,829	100.00
Valid votes		988,829	92.05
Invalid votes		53,787	5.01
Blank votes		31,608	2.94
Total votes		1,074,224	100.00
Registered voters/turnout		1,939,344	55.39
Source: National Independent Election Commission

== See also ==
- Politics of Mauritania
- List of prime ministers of Mauritania
- List of colonial governors of Mauritania
