= 2006 Mauritanian constitutional referendum =

- 25 June 2006

Results
Choice	Votes	%
Yes	712,214	96.95%
No	10,482	1.43%
Blank votes	11,951	1.63%
Valid votes	734,647	97.10%
Invalid votes	21,914	2.90%
Total votes	756,561	100.00%
Registered voters/turnout	989,664	76.45%

A constitutional referendum was held in Mauritania on June 25, 2006 and approved by nearly 97% of voters. Following the August 2005 ousting of long-time president Maaouya Ould Sid'Ahmed Taya, the new transitional military regime called the referendum on a new constitution, which limited presidents to two five-year terms; previously presidential terms were six years and there was no limit on re-election. The new constitution also established a maximum age limit of 75 for presidential candidates.

== Results ==
Choice	Votes	%
For	712,214	96.95
Against	10,482	1.43
Blank	11,951	1.63
Total	734,647	100.00
Valid votes	734,647	97.10
Invalid votes	21,914	2.90
Total votes	756,561	100.00
Registered voters/turnout	989,664	76.45
Source: Official Journal
