= 2003 Mauritanian coup attempt =

Attempted military overthrow of President Taya

2003 Mauritanian coup d'état attempt
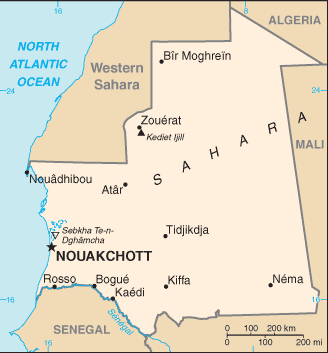
- A CIA WFB map of Mauritania
- Date: 8–9 June 2003
- Location: Nouakchott, Mauritania
- Type: Military coup
- Motive: Regime change
- Target: Presidential Palace, Nouakchott
- Organised by: Saleh Ould Hanenna
- Participants: Faction within the Armed Forces
- Outcome: Coup fails: Maaouya Ould Sid'Ahmed Taya remains in power.; Re-election of Taya as President in November.

The 2003 Mauritanian coup d'état attempt was a violent military coup attempt in Mauritania which took place on 8–9 June 2003.

The coup attempt, led by Major Saleh Ould Hanenna who commanded a rebel section of the Army, resulted in two days of heavy fighting in the capital Nouakchott, before rebel soldiers were defeated by troops loyal to the President, Colonel Maaouya Ould Sid'Ahmed Taya.

Taya subsequently won the 7 November 2003 presidential election with over 67% of the popular vote, amid opposition claims of electoral fraud; the second-place candidate and former head of state (CMSN chairman), Colonel Mohamed Khouna Ould Haidalla, was arrested both immediately before and after the election, and was accused of plotting a coup.

Hanenna initially escaped capture, and announced the formation of a rebel group called the 'Knights of Change', but was eventually captured in late 2004, and sentenced to life imprisonment (instead of recommended death sentence) along with other alleged plotters in early 2005.

Following the 2005 coup d'état, which deposed Taya, Hannena was released in an amnesty declared by the new military junta, the Military Council for Justice and Democracy (CMJD).
