= Alliance for a Democratic Mauritania =

The Alliance for a Democratic Mauritania (French, Alliance pour une Mauritanie démocratique, AMD) was a Mauritanian clandestine opposition movement.

The AMD was organized in May 1980, around former President Moktar Ould Daddah, after he had gone into exile in Paris, France, following the 1978 coup d'état that overthrew him; and former military leader Col. Mustafa Ould Salek.

It demanded a multi-party democracy in Mauritania, although the regime countered that Ould Daddah had in fact presided over a one-party state, and Ould Salek over a junta. The movement enjoyed support from Morocco and pro-Moroccan states in the Gulf region, and at the very least, it was allowed to organize in France. The formation of the AMD took place in the context of the Western Sahara war, which Ould Daddah (and to a lesser extent Ould Salek) had fought in alliance with Morocco, but from which the present leader, Col. Mohamed Khouna Ould Heidallah, had withdrawn.

On March 18, 1981, the AMD organized a coup d'état of its own against Heidallah's CMSN junta, but the action failed. Some of the responsible in Mauritania were arrested, and subsequently executed.

This prompted Heidallah to seek closer relations with the Western Saharan Polisario Front, and with its backer and Morocco's main rival in the region, Algeria.
