= 2003 Mauritanian presidential election =

| ← 1997 | 7 November 2003 | 2007 → |
- Turnout: 60.86%
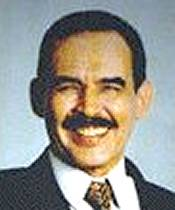

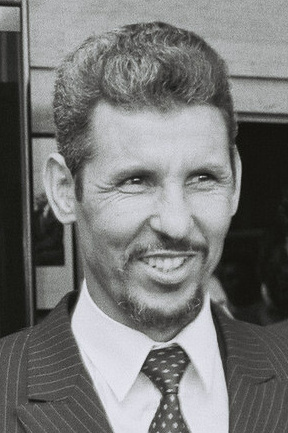
| Nominee | Maaouya Ould Sid'Ahmed Taya | Mohamed Khouna Ould Haidalla |
| Party | PRDS | Independent |
| Popular vote | 438,915 | 123,244 |
| Percentage | 66.69% | 18.73% |
- Results by wilaya
President before election
Maaouya Ould Sid'Ahmed Taya
PRDS
Elected President
Maaouya Ould Sid'Ahmed Taya
PRDS

Presidential elections were held in Mauritania on 7 November 2003. As expected, incumbent President Maaouya Ould Sid'Ahmed Taya was easily re-elected against weak opposition.

The opposition alleged election fraud, and Ould Taya's main challenger, former military ruler Mohamed Khouna Ould Haidalla (the man who Ould Taya ousted when he seized power in December 1984), was arrested both immediately before and after the vote. The elections saw two notable firsts; Aicha Bint Jeddane was the country's first female presidential candidate, and Messaoud Ould Boulkheir was the first descendant of slaves to run for the office.

The elections took place a few months after a violent unsuccessful coup attempt in June 2003. Ould Taya was overthrown in a coup two years later, in August 2005.

== Results ==
| Candidate | Party | Votes | % |
|---|---|---|---|
| Maaouya Ould Sid'Ahmed Taya | Democratic and Social Republican Party | 438,915 | 66.69 |
| Mohamed Khouna Ould Haidalla | Independent | 123,244 | 18.73 |
| Ahmed Ould Daddah | Rally of Democratic Forces | 45,314 | 6.89 |
| Messaoud Ould Boulkheir | People's Progressive Alliance | 33,089 | 5.03 |
| Moulaye Elhacen Ould Jeid | Independent | 9,768 | 1.48 |
| Aïcha Mint Jedaane | Independent | 3,100 | 0.47 |
| Against all | | 4,718 | 0.72 |
| Total | | 658,148 | 100.00 |
| Valid votes | | 658,148 | 97.71 |
| Invalid/blank votes | | 15,443 | 2.29 |
| Total votes | | 673,591 | 100.00 |
| Registered voters/turnout | | 1,106,827 | 60.86 |
Source: Europa, IFES, IDEA
