= Laaroussien =

Tribe in Northern Africa

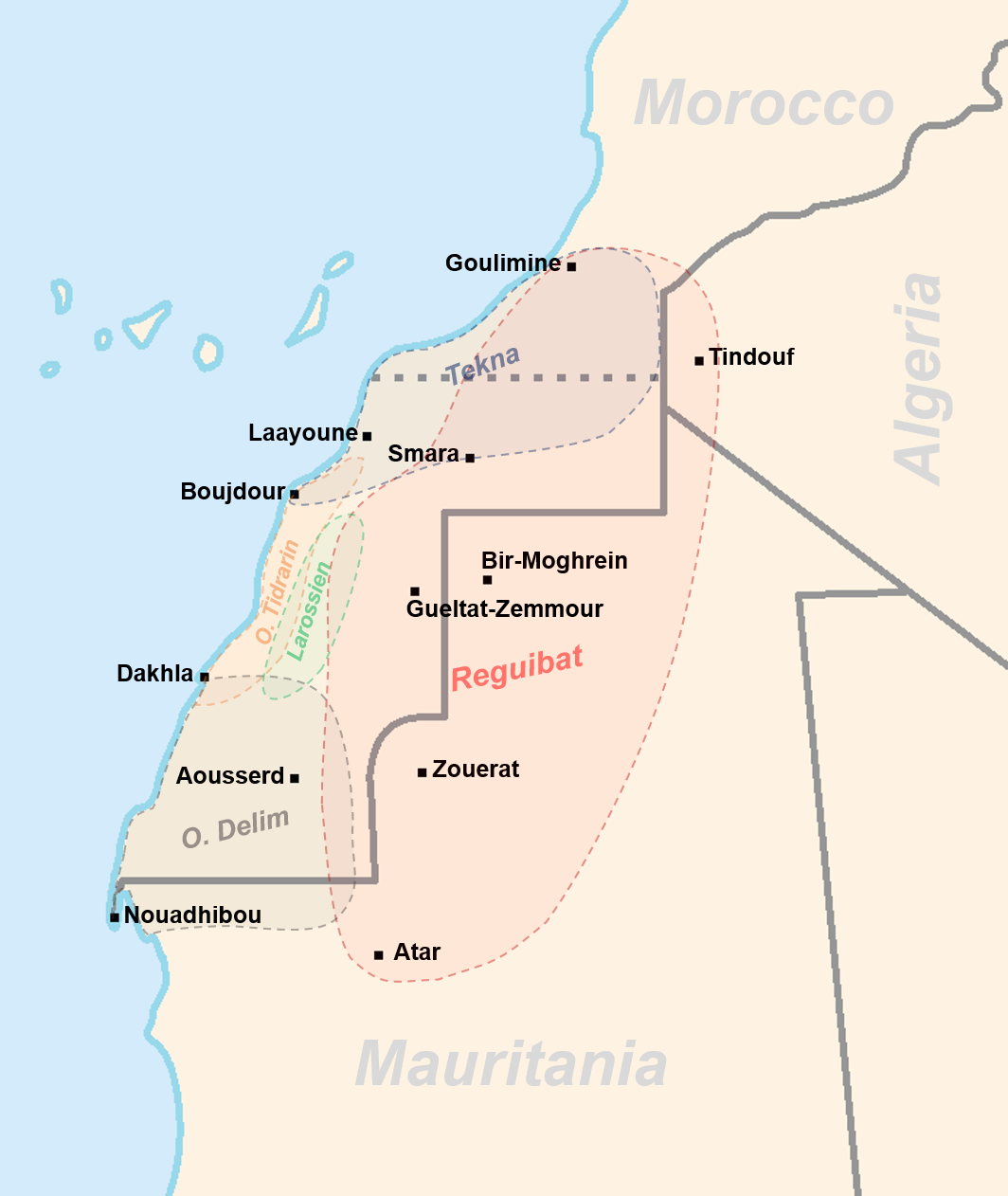
Map of the tribes of Western Sahara with Laaroussien in green

The Laaroussien (Arabic: العروسيين; also spelled Larosien, Laârousienne, Aarousiyine, al-Arosien, etc.) is a Sahrawi tribe traditionally migrating within the region that is today the disputed territory of Western Sahara. Their migratory routes stretched from El Aaiún down towards Dakhla, parallel to the coast of the territory. Like all Sahrawis, they are Sunni Muslims of the Maliki madhhab.

== Origins ==
They hold the status as a Chorfa tribe, i.e. claiming descent from the Prophet Muhammad. Their tribal ancestor, the famous Sidi Ahmed Al Aroussi (or Laaroussi, died in 1593, 30 km near to Semara in Western Sahara), descends from the Beni Arrous tribe neat Larache and comes from a lineage of the Alami religious order founded by Abu Bakr al-Alami al-Idrissi and Abd as-Salam ibn Mashish al-Alami. He was claimed to have performed miracles: according to tribal lore, he was lifted to safety by angels, after having once been captured - for unclear reasons - by the Sultan of Morocco.

== Population today ==
Laaroussien Sahrawis are present both in the Tindouf refugee camps of Algeria, headquarters of the nationalist and independence-seeking Polisario Front, and in their traditional home areas of Western Sahara; these are situated west of the Moroccan Wall, and thus under Moroccan rule. (See History of Western Sahara for a background to the dispute.) Few members of the Laaroussien live in neighbouring Mauritania; they are not a transfrontier tribe, traditionally, although, as an exception to the rule, a former President of Mauritania (1979–84), Col. Mohamed Khouna Ould Heidallah, is Laaroussien - he is born in or near the border region of Ras Nouadhibou, either in Mauritania or what was then Spanish Sahara.

== Notable Laarousis ==
- Mahfoud Ali Beiba - Sahrawi politician and co-founder of the Polisario Front
- Mohamed Khouna Ould Haidalla - former President of Mauritania
