= 1980 Mauritanian coup d'état =

1980 military coup in Mauritania

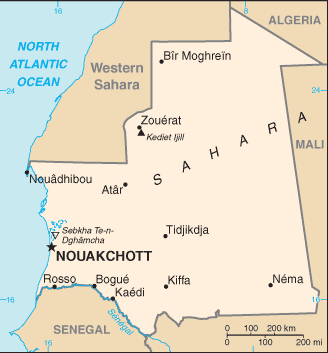
- A CIA WFB map of Mauritania
- Date: 4 January 1980
- Location: Nouakchott, Mauritania
- Type: Military coup
- Motive: Regime change
- Target: Presidential Palace, Nouakchott
- Organised by: Mohamed Khouna Ould Haidalla
- Participants: Faction within the Armed Forces
- Outcome: Coup succeeds: Overthrow of Mohamed Mahmoud Ould Louly.; Haidalla assumed the presidency of the CMSN.

The 1980 Mauritanian coup d'état was a military coup in Mauritania which took place on 4 January 1980.

The coup was led by the prime minister, Colonel Mohamed Khouna Ould Haidalla, who seized power from the president, Lieutenant-Colonel Mohamed Mahmoud Ould Louly. Haidalla had assumed the presidency of the 24-member ruling Military Committee for National Salvation (CMSN), a military junta which was created following an earlier coup in 1979.

Following the coup, Haidalla continued to serve as both president and prime minister until 12 December 1980, when he appointed a civilian government with Sid'Ahmed Ould Bneijara as prime minister.
