= Ely Ould Mohamed Vall =

Head of State of Mauritania from 2005 to 2007

- إعلي ولد محمد فال
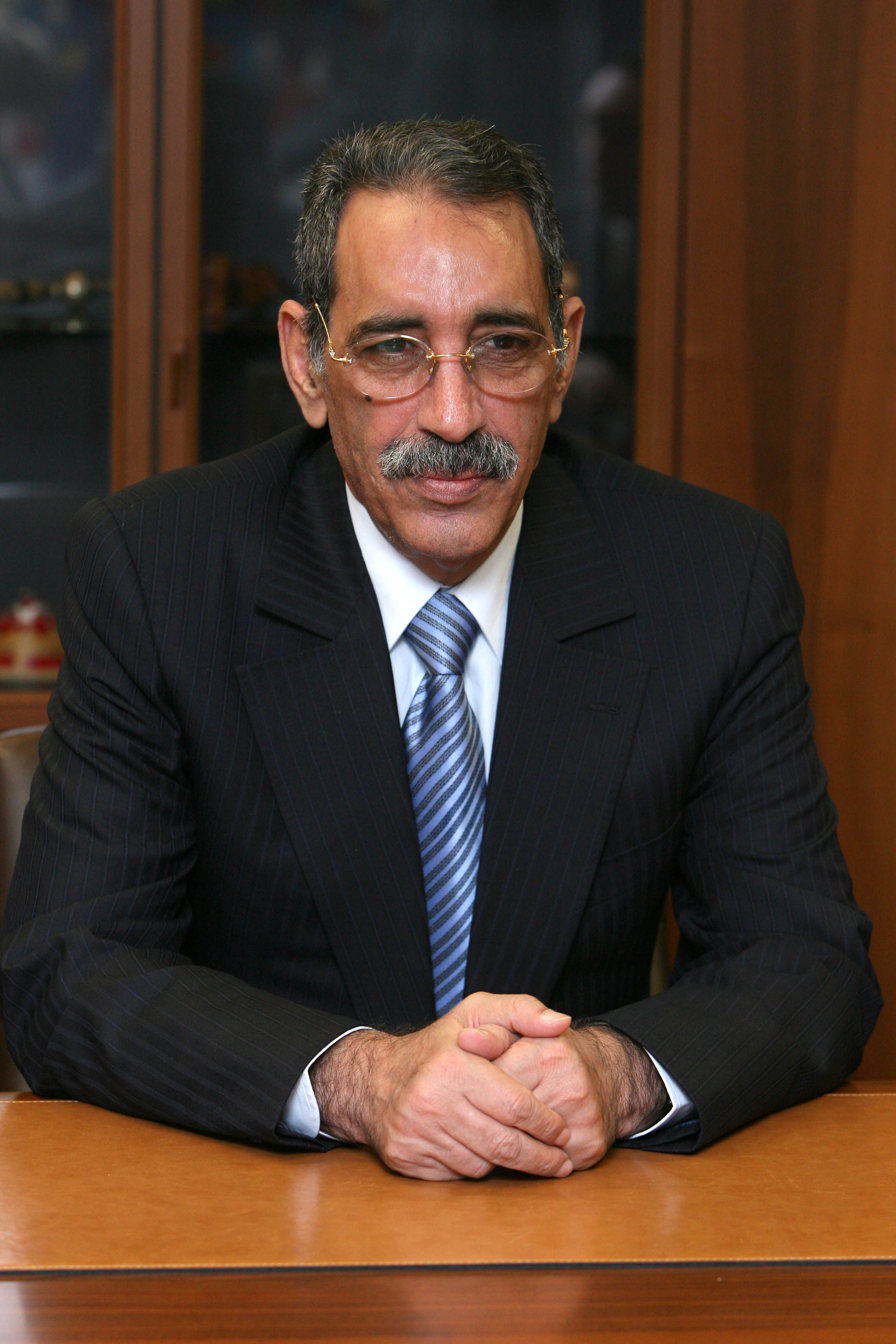
- Ely in 2006

Chairman of the Military Council for Justice and Democracy
- In office 3 August 2005 – 19 April 2007
- Preceded by: Maaouya Ould Sid'Ahmed Taya
- Succeeded by: Sidi Ould Cheikh Abdallahi

Personal details
- Born: 1953 Nouakchott, Colonial Mauritania
- Died: 5 May 2017 (aged 63–64) Zouérat, Tiris Zemmour Region, Mauritania
- Party: Sûreté Nationale
- Spouse: Oum Kelthoum Mint Nahi

Colonel Ely Ould Mohamed Vall (Arabic: إعلي ولد محمد فال I‘lī Wald Muḥammad Fāl; 1953 – 5 May 2017) was a Mauritanian political and military figure. Following a coup d'état in August 2005, he served as the transitional military leader of Mauritania until 19 April 2007, when he relinquished power to an elected government.

== Life and career ==
Born in Nouakchott in 1953, Ely Ould Mohamed Vall was a long-time ally of President Maaouya Ould Sid'Ahmed Taya, and participated in the December 1984 coup that brought Ould Taya himself to power. Prior to the 2005 coup, he had been Director of the national police force, the Sûreté Nationale, since 1987.

On 3 August 2005, Ould Taya was ousted in a bloodless military coup while he was out of the country. A group of officers took power as the Military Council for Justice and Democracy and announced that Ely was the Chairman of the council. He did not take the title of President because he said it should be reserved for elected leaders.

The new regime, condemning Ould Taya's government as "totalitarian", promised to lead the country to elections and the restoration of civilian rule within two years; a referendum on a new constitution was planned to be held within a year, and parliamentary and presidential elections would follow. Ely and the other members of the military council agreed not to run for president.

The coup was welcomed by a part of the population, but outside the country there was sharp condemnation. The African Union (which suspended Mauritania's membership), the European Union, United Nations Secretary General Kofi Annan, and the United States all condemned the coup. However, this opposition weakened after several days, and the regime appeared to win tacit international acceptance.

Ely maintained Mauritania's diplomatic relationship with Israel. Mauritania and Israel initiated full diplomatic relations in 1999 under Taya, a decision which contributed to the latter's unpopularity. After the coup, Ahmed Ould Sid'Ahmed, who had been Foreign Minister at the time diplomatic relations were established, was reappointed to the position.

The constitutional referendum was held on June 25, 2006, and approved by 97% of voters. The 2006 constitution limits presidents to two five-year terms (under Taya, presidential terms had lasted six years and there was no limit on re-election) and requires a president to swear not to change the term limits (several other African countries have seen term limits removed from their constitutions so that presidents could continue to run for re-election). Ely toured the country beforehand to promote it and called it a "historical opportunity". Parliamentary and local elections were held on November 19, 2006, which Ely praised as "the first time Mauritanians have been able to express themselves freely"; he also said that the difficulty of changing the constitution would preserve democracy in the future. Ely announced that he would step down after the March 2007 presidential election. The election was ultimately won by Sidi Ould Cheikh Abdallahi in the second round of voting. Abdallahi's opponents alleged that his candidacy was supported by Ely's regime. Prior to the handover, Mauritania was allowed back into the African Union on April 10.

On April 19, Abdallahi officially took office, completing the transition to civilian democratic rule.

The military under General Mohamed Ould Abdel Aziz seized power again in August 2008, ousting Abdallahi, and a new presidential election was planned. Ely announced on 6 June 2009 that he would be a candidate, running as an independent. He condemned the 2008 coup, asserting that it was "wrong and there was no reason for it" and that it had "provoked a particularly dangerous situation in our country". He stressed, however, that his candidacy was not directed against any particular individual, and he said that his goal, if elected, was "to build a reconciled country that is politically and economically viable and stable". He also said that he would "probably no longer be interested in public affairs" if not for the 2008 coup.

Official results showed Ely performing poorly in the election, which was held on 18 July 2009, while Abdel Aziz won a majority in the first round. At a press conference on 30 July, Ely said that the election was merely a means of legitimizing the 2008 coup and that it had effectively reverted the country to the authoritarianism it had experienced under President Taya. He also said that he would continue to struggle against Abdel Aziz's regime.

Ely was a board member of the Arab Democracy Foundation. He was also a member of the Fondation Chirac's honor committee, ever since the foundation was launched in 2008 by former French president Jacques Chirac in order to promote world peace.

Ely died of a heart attack on 5 May 2017 at Zouérat.

Preceded by Maaouya Ould Sid'Ahmed Taya (as President)	Chairman of the Military Council for Justice and Democracy; 2005 – 2007	Succeeded by Sidi Ould Cheikh Abdallahi (as President)
