= 1979 Mauritanian coup d'état =

1979 military coup in Mauritania

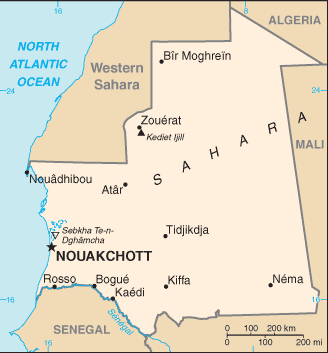
- A CIA WFB map of Mauritania
- Date: 6 April 1979
- Location: Nouakchott, Mauritania
- Type: Military coup
- Motive: Regime change
- Target: Presidential Palace, Nouakchott
- Organised by: Ahmed Ould Bouceif; Mohamed Khouna Ould Haidalla
- Participants: Faction within the Armed Forces
- Outcome: Coup succeeds: Dismissal of the CMRN.; Formation of the CMSN.; Resignation of Mustafa Ould Salek.; Mohamed Mahmoud Ould Louly assumed the presidency of the CMSN.; Bouceif assumed the premiership, to be succeeded by Haidalla on his death.

The 1979 Mauritanian coup d'état was a military coup in Mauritania which took place on 6 April 1979. The coup was led by Colonel Ahmed Ould Bouceif and Colonel Mohamed Khouna Ould Haidalla, who seized power from President, Colonel Mustafa Ould Salek and the 20-member ruling Military Committee for National Recovery (CMRN), a military junta which was formed after a previous coup in 1978.

The coup resulted in the dismissal of the CMRN and the creation of the 24-member junta, the Military Committee for National Salvation (CMSN), initially under the presidency of Salek as a figurehead until his official resignation on 3 June. He was succeeded by Lieutenant-Colonel Mohamed Mahmoud Ould Louly. Bouceif was appointed prime minister, and served until his death in an airplane crash in Senegal on 27 May. He was succeeded by Haidalla on 31 May.
