= Mauritania Islamic Air Force =

Air warfare branch of Mauritanian Armed Forces

- Force Aérienne Islamique de Mauritanie
- Mauritanian Armed Forces emblem
- Founded: 1960; 66 years ago
- Country: Mauritania
- Type: Air force
- Role: Aerial warfare
- Part of: Mauritanian Armed Forces
- Engagements: Western Sahara War; Mauritania–Senegal Border War; 2003 Mauritanian coup attempt

Commanders
- Commander-in-Chief: President Mohamed Ould Ghazouani
- Commanding Officer: General Abe Babty El Hadj Ahmed

Insignia
- Roundel

Aircraft flown
- Attack: Embraer EMB 314 Super Tucano
- Helicopter: Harbin Z-9
- Transport: Basler BT-67, Cessna 208 Caravan, Harbin Y-12, Pilatus PC-6

The Mauritania Islamic Air Force (French: Force Aérienne Islamique de Mauritanie or FAIM, sometimes also Faidem) is the air force of the Armed Forces of Mauritania. It was established in 1960. Like many of the former French colonies, Mauritania received limited economic and military aid from France. The FAIM started out as a French-operated transport force, and has seen combat against the Polisario Front in the 1970s.

== History ==
=== Beginnings ===
The Mauritania Islamic Air Force came into being shortly after the country's independence, in 1960. At that time, it was named the Aviation Group of the Islamic Republic of Mauritania (Groupement Aérien de la République Islamique de Mauritanie). Its first aircraft were one Douglas C-47 and several Max Holste MH.1521 Broussards, all donated by France and operating from the airfield at Nouakchott. All of the newly created air force's personnel was French. Five additional C-47s and three Broussards were bought in the following years. In 1966, the air force was officially re-designated as the Mauritania Islamic Air Force (Force Aérienne Islamique de Mauritanie or FAIM for short). The purchase of six SOCATA Rallyes allowed for the training of native pilots to begin in 1970.

Thanks to the influx of newly trained native pilots and ground personnel, the FAIM grew significantly in the early 1970s. A 1971 reorganisation saw the creation of a transport squadron (operating C-47s) and a liaison squadron (operating the Broussards and seven second-hand Reims-Cessna Skymasters. Two Douglas C-54s were bought in 1974, and two Short Skyvan 3Ms followed the next year. In 1976, four Reims-Cessna FTB337Gs and four Britten-Norman Defenders were acquired, and formed a surveillance squadron. Both of these types could be armed with gun and rocket pods. Over the years, a total of nine Defenders were bought. Subsequently, negotiations for the purchase of FMA IA 58 Pucarás were initiated with Argentina. A contract was almost concluded, but the acquisition process was stopped due to financial considerations. However, four de Havilland Canada DHC-5 Buffalos were bought in 1978. As of 1976, the FAIM numbered less than 150 personnel.

=== War with the Polisario Front ===
In 1976, the Polisario Front started to attack Mauritanian territory. Flying activity by the FAIM was intense, and in June, the second-ever foray of the Polisario in Mauritania, in the direction of the capital Nouakchott, was detected by FAIM aircraft while still underway towards its target. The Polisario convoy, comprising about 100 vehicles, thus had to retreat prematurely. Moreover, FAIM BN-2 Defenders repeatedly harassed the convoy while it was driving towards the Algerian border. However, these aircraft were vulnerable to ground fire, and on 29 December a Defender was shot down by a 9K32 Strela-2 MANPADS, with the whole crew being killed. Another followed on 16 July 1977, with one killed; the two survivors evaded capture from the Polisario. A third Defender was downed by a Strela-2 on 10 January 1978, with its pilot being killed. In early February of the same year, Defenders helped evacuate dozens of wounded soldiers from the army garrison of Tichlé, which had withstood a Polisario attack.

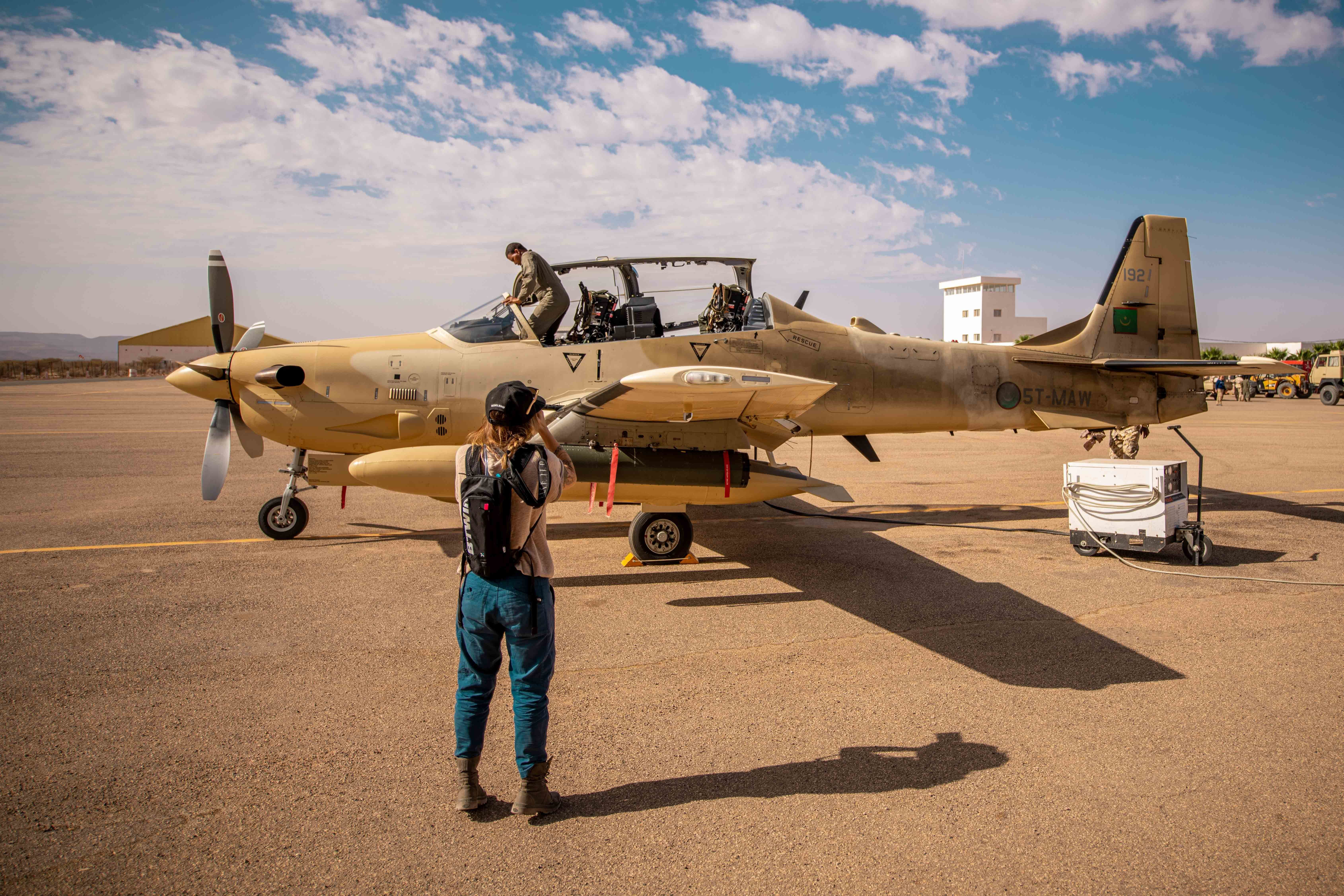
FAIM Super Tucano seen in Atar during exercise Flintlock 2020.

The war against the Polisario Front was a huge strain on the Mauritanian national budget, and it caused more and more discontent in the country, including inside of its armed forces. Two successful military coups took place in 1978 and 1979 respectively. While the war with the Polisario continued, on 27 May 1979 the junta's strongman Ahmed Ould Bouceif died in the crash of the FAIM DHC-5D that was bringing him to an ECOWAS summit in Dakar, together with the other 11 occupants. The new Mauritanian government then decided to stop the country's involvement in Western Sahara, and a peace treaty between Mauritania and the Polisario Front was signed in August.

=== From the 1980s to today ===
The Air Force School was recently created in Atar. It was founded to train pilots, mechanics, other crewmen for the Air Force.

More recent procurements have been from China in the form of the Harbin Y-12 II turboprop transports were delivered in September 1995, one crashed in April 1996. A second one crashed on July 12, 2012. The Xian Y-7 (a licensed variant of the An-24) was delivered from October 1997, which crashed in May 1998. And a SF.260 was crashed in May 2024.

== Aircraft ==
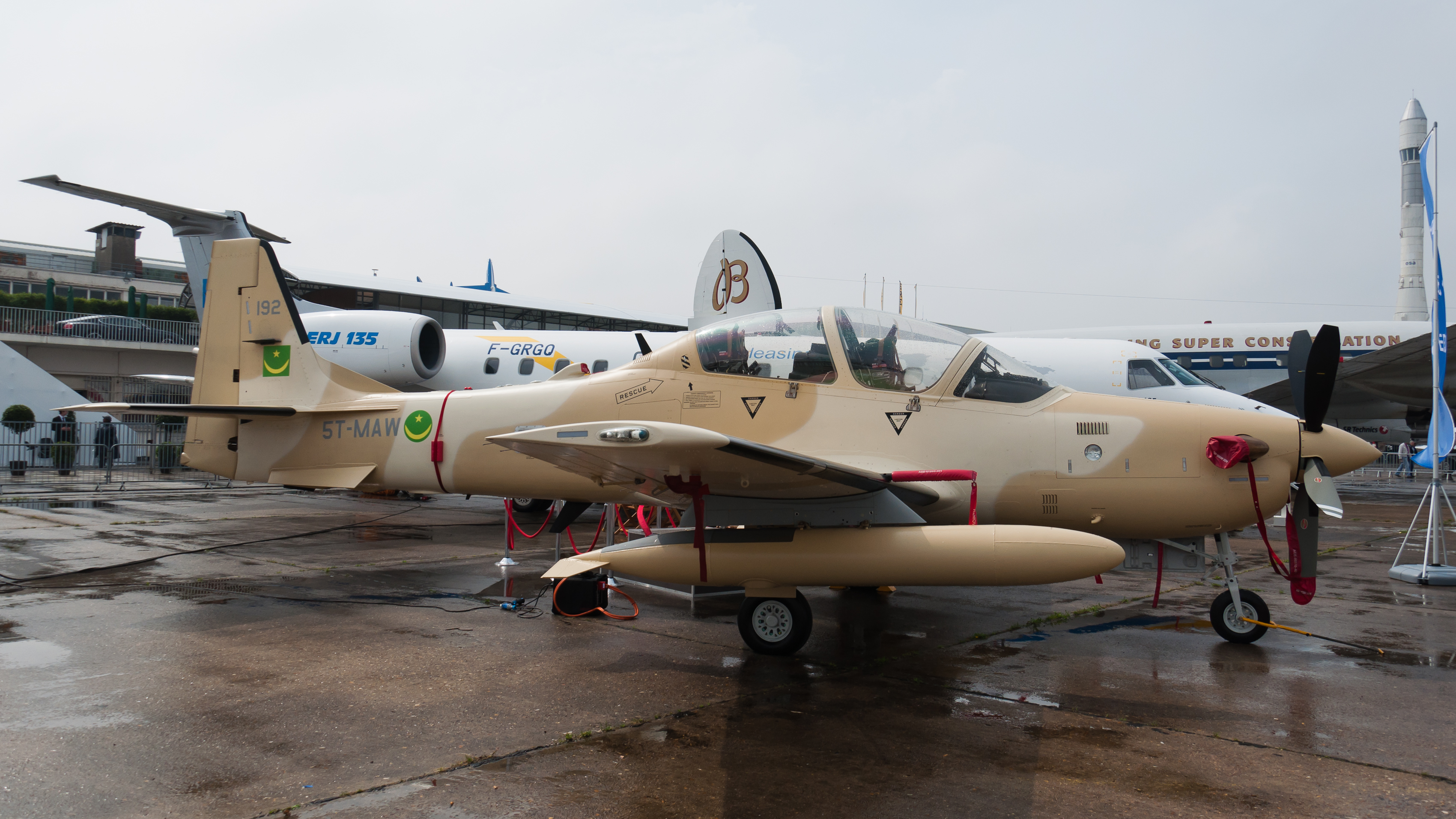
FAIM Super Tucano seen at the 2013 Paris Air Show.

Aircraft	Origin	Type	Variant	In service	Notes
Combat aircraft
EMB 314 Super Tucano	Brazil	Attack / COIN		4	
Reconnaissance
Cessna 208	United States	Reconnaissance		2	
Transport
Basler BT-67	United States	Transport / Utility		1	Modified DC-3 with P&W PT6A turboprop engines
Cessna 441	United States	VIP transport		1	
Pilatus PC-6	Switzerland	Utility		1	STOL capable aircraft
CASA/IPTN CN-235	Indonesia	Transport		2	
Beechcraft Super King Air	United States	Transport	King Air 350	2	
Helicopters
Harbin Z-9	China	Utility		2	
AgustaWestland AW109	Italy	Utility		2	
Trainer aircraft
EMB-312	Brazil	Trainer		5	
SIAI-Marchetti SF.260	Italy	Trainer		1	

== See also ==
- List of air forces
