= Mohamed Mahmoud Ould Louly =

Head of state of Mauritania from 1979 to 1980

- محمد محمود ولد أحمد لولي
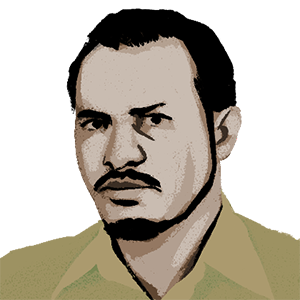
- An illustration of Louly produced by Voice of America

3rd Chairman of the Military Committee for National Salvation
- In office 3 June 1979 – 4 January 1980
- Preceded by: Mustafa Ould Salek
- Succeeded by: Mohamed Khouna Ould Haidalla

Personal details
- Born: 1 January 1943 Tidjikja, Tagant Region, Mauritania, French West Africa
- Died: 16 March 2019 (aged 76) Nouakchott, Mauritania

Military service
- Branch/service: Mauritanian Army
- Years of service: 1960 - 1980
- Rank: Lieutenant Colonel
- Battles/wars: Western Sahara War

Lt. Col. Mohamed Mahmoud Ould Louly (Arabic: محمد محمود ولد أحمد لولي; 1 January 1943 – 16 March 2019) was a Mauritanian military officer and politician who served as the President of Mauritania and Chairman of the Military Committee for National Salvation (CMSN) from 3 June 1979 to 4 January 1980.

== Biography ==
Mohamed Mahmoud entered the Mauritanian army in November 1960, the year of Independence and was trained in the French military academies. He then held various positions of responsibility in the government of Moktar Ould Daddah.

In July 1978, he was one of the founding members of the Military Committee for National Recovery (CMRN), which under the leadership of Mustafa Ould Salek, overthrew on July 10, 1978, President Moktar Ould Daddah in a military coup due to the conflict in Western Sahara.

On April 6, 1979, Mohamed Mahmoud and Ahmed Ould Bouceif supported by Lieutenant-Colonel Mohamed Khouna Ould Haidalla and the new Military Committee for National Salvation (CMSN), overthrew Mustafa Ould Salek due to his loss of influence and power within the CMSN, and also due to many economic problems arising from the conflict in the Western Sahara and the growing gap between Arabs and black Africans in the country.

On 4 January 1980, his Prime Minister, Mohamed Khouna Ould Haidalla, dismissed him in another military coup.

He died peacefully on March 16, 2019, in Nouakchott.
