= Sid Ahmed Ould Bneijara =

Mauritanian politician (1947–2017)

Sid'Ahmed Ould Bneijara (1947 – 30 August 2017) was the 4th Prime Minister of Mauritania from December 12, 1980, until April 25, 1981.

== Biography ==
He was Minister of Finance from July 1977 to March 1979. He had a short term as the Governor of Central Bank of Mauritania in summer 1978.

He was first appointed by Col. Mohamed Khouna Ould Haidallah of the Military Committee for National Salvation (CMSN), on December 12, 1980, to replace Haidallah himself. Sid'Ahmed, who was not a military man, was to lead the return to civilian government.

On April 25, 1981, less than five months later, Sid'Ahmed was again dismissed, after Col. Mohamed Khouna had decided to reinstate military rule. This came as a result of the March 16 attempt at a coup d'état by the Alliance for a Democratic Mauritania (AMD).

His successor, Col. Maaouya Ould Sid'Ahmed Taya, on 12 December 1984 depose Col. Mohamed Khouna and himself rule the country until 2005.

Sid'Ahmed died in Spain in 2017.

Political offices
Preceded by Mohamed Khouna Ould Haidalla	Prime Minister of Mauritania; 1980–1981	Succeeded by Maaouya Ould Sid'Ahmed Taya
