= Mauritania–Morocco relations =

- Mauritania: Morocco

Mauritania–Morocco relations are the bilateral diplomatic relations between Mauritania and Morocco. Since 1975, the two countries have shared a de facto border following Spain’s withdrawal from the territory of Western Sahara, most of which came under Moroccan control as a result of the Western Sahara War. The status of Western Sahara remains disputed, but since 1984 Mauritania has recognized the independence of the Sahrawi Arab Democratic Republic from Morocco.

== History ==
Moroccan claims, especially within the Istiqlal party, of Greater Morocco, which would include the entirety of Mauritania were quickly shelved. But the looming question of Western Saharan independence has been the major subject in the relationship of these two countries.

Prior to the December 1984 coup that brought Maaouya Ould Sid'Ahmed Taya to power, the Mauritanian-Moroccan co-operation agency stated that relations between the two countries were on the mend in spite of alleged Moroccan complicity in a 1981 coup attempt and Mauritania's subsequent turn toward Algeria.

Representatives from both sides initiated a series of low-level contacts that led to a resumption of full diplomatic ties in April 1985. For Mauritania, the détente with Morocco promised to end the threat of Moroccan incursions, and it also removed the threat of Moroccan support for opposition groups formed during the Haidalla presidency. Through the agreement with Mauritania, Morocco sought to tighten its control over the Western Sahara by denying the Polisario one more avenue for infiltrating guerrillas into the disputed territory.

Relations between Morocco and Mauritania continued to improve through 1986, reflecting President Ould Taya's pragmatic, if unstated, view that only a Moroccan victory over the Polisario would end the guerrilla war in the Western Sahara. Ould Taya made his first visit to Morocco in October 1985 (prior to visits to Algeria and Tunisia) in the wake of Moroccan claims that Polisario guerrillas were again traversing Mauritanian territory. The completion of a sixth berm just north of Mauritania's crucial rail link along the border with the Western Sahara, between Nouadhibou and the iron ore mines, complicated relations between Mauritania and Morocco. Polisario guerrillas in mid-1987 had to traverse Mauritanian territory to enter the Western Sahara, a situation that invited Morocco's accusations of Mauritanian complicity. Moreover, any engagements near the sixth berm would threaten to spill over into Mauritania and jeopardize the rail link.

== Economic relations ==
The economic ties between the two countries are solid, as reported by the Moroccan newspaper Liberation. Mauritania, with a population of 2.5 million, is currently receiving $1.5 billion annually from international development agencies. In the last year, commercial exchange with Morocco grew by 41 percent, totaling 25 million euros. The vast majority of this commerce flowed from Morocco to Mauritania. Moroccan corporations are also investing heavily in Mauritania, such as Ittisalat al-Maghrib (Maroc Télécom), which in 2001 acquired a controlling share in the Mauritanian telephone company, Mauritel, at a price of $84 million.

The Moroccan Office for Mineral Research and Exploitation owns 2.35 percent of Mauritania's chief economic powerhouse, the National Industrial and Mining Corporation, which extracts iron ore and supports more than 5,000 Mauritanian households. Another Moroccan company, DRAPOR, a subsidiary of the Moroccan Office of Port Development, has contracted to dredge the port of Nouakchott. There is also a newly created partnership between Moroccan and Mauritanian companies for the distribution of fuel and the building of a refinery.

Morocco is also participating in internationally financed Mauritanian development projects, like the planned 470 kilometres (292 mi) Nouakchott-Nouadhibou road. The total cost of this road is estimated at $70 million. The principal financing comes from the Arab Fund for Economic and Social Development, which is supplying $51.6 million. The African Development Bank and the Islamic Development Bank are supplying $10 million, while the Mauritanian government is contributing $9 million. Four Moroccan companies contracted to produce the initial studies and plans for the road at a cost of over $39 million, and the Moroccan government is bankrolling the construction of nearly 14 km (9 mi) of the road at a cost of $2.6 million.
