= Central Bank of Mauritania =

Central bank of Mauritania, in northwest Africa

Coordinates: 18°5′29″N 15°58′21″W

Central Bank of Mauritania البنك المركزي الموريتاني

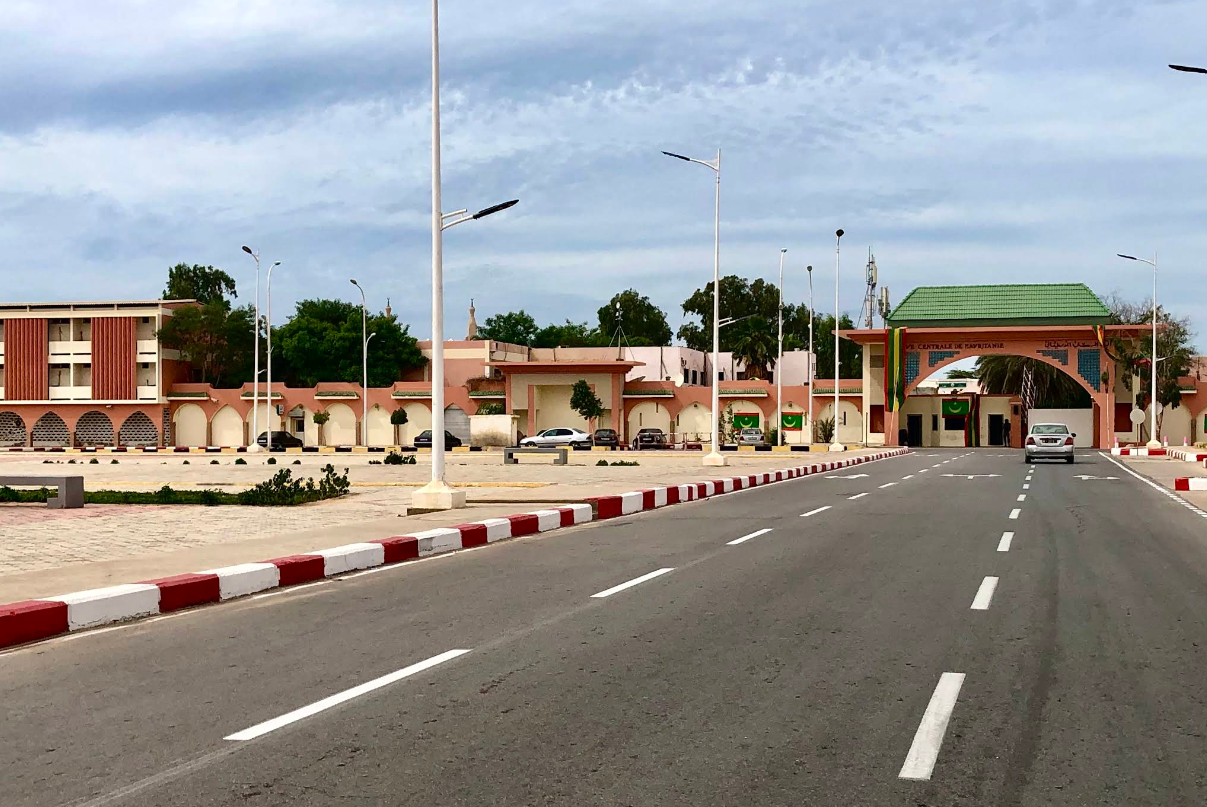
- Headquarters: Nouakchott
- Established: 1973
- Ownership: 100% state ownership
- Governor: Mohamed Lemine Ould Dhehby
- Key people: Boumedienne Ould Taya (Deputy-Governor)
- Central bank of: Mauritania
- Currency: Mauritanian ouguiya MRU (ISO 4217)
- Reserves: $1,710 billion
- Website: www.bcm.mr

The Central Bank of Mauritania (French: Banque centrale de Mauritanie, BCM; Arabic: البنك المركزي الموريتاني) is the central bank of Mauritania, in northwest Africa. The bank is located in the capital Nouakchott, just south of the Presidential Palace. Its current Governor is Mohamed Lemine Ould Dhehby.

== History ==
The bank was created by acts of the legislature of Mauritania, in 1973, 1974 and 1975. It was established by President Moktar Ould Daddah after he withdrew Mauritania from the French-dominated monetary consortium, the Communauté Financière Africaine.

== Governors ==
- Ahmed Ould Daddah, June 1973 - May 1978
- Sid'Ahmed Ould Bneijara, May 1978 - July 1978
- Dieng Boubou Farba, July 1978 - April 1981
- Ahmed Ould Zein, April 1981 - July 1983
- Dieng Boubou Farba, July 1983 - September 1987
- Mohamed Ould Nany, September 1987 - April 1988
- Ahmed Ould Zein, April 1988 - June 1992
- Moustapha Ould Abeiderrahmane, June 1992 - June 1993
- Mohamedou Ould Michel, June 1993 - December 1997
- Mahfoudh Ould Mohamed Aly, December 1997 - January 2001
- Sid El Moctar Ould Nagi, January 2001 - August 2002
- Yahya Ould Athighe, August 2002 - January 2003
- Ba Seydou Moussa, January 2003 - June 2003
- Ahmed Salem Ould Tebakh, June 2003 - July 2004
- Zein Ould Zeidane, July 2004 - September 2006
- Kane Ousmane, September 2006 - November 2008
- Sidatty Benhameyda, November 2008 - August 2009
- Sid'Ahmed Ould Raiss, August 2009 - January 2015
- Abdel Aziz Ould Dahi, January 2015 - January 2020
- Cheikh El Kebir Moulay Taher, January 2020 - March 2022
- Mohamed Lemine Ould Dhehby, March 2022 – present.

== See also ==
- Ministry of Finance (Mauritania)
- Mauritanian ouguiya
- Economy of Mauritania
- List of central banks of Africa
- List of central banks
- List of financial supervisory authorities by country
