= El Bordo, Salta =

Coordinates: 24°39′46″S 65°06′21″W

El Bordo
- Municipality and town
- Interactive map of El Bordo
- Country: Argentina
- Province: Salta Province

Government
  - Type: Municipality
  - Intendant: Sergio Copa
- Elevation: 2,612 ft (796 m)

Population (2001)
  - Total: 4,913
- Time zone: UTC−3 (ART)

El Bordo is a town and municipality in Salta Province in northwestern Argentina.

The former Intendant Juan Rosario Mazzone, who was involved in controversy over alleged involvement with underage girls, has been impeached and removed from office. The intendant who succeeded him, Matías Assennato, also closed the city council.
