= Juan Rosario Mazzone =

Juan Rosario Mazzone was the Intendant of El Bordo, Salta. He has been involved in a political sex scandal, been impeached and removed from office, and currently faces legal charges of child sexual abuse.

== Personal life ==
Mazzone said that he has 11 out of wedlock offspring with different women. One of those women was hired at the civil registry; but was fired after Mazzone's removal from office when the new mayor discovered that she did not actually work.

== Sex scandal ==
A Facebook user published several photos of the mayor on January 7, 2015, who was seen with semi-naked underaged girls. The newspaper La Gaceta had an immediate interview with Mazzone, who confirmed that the photos were real. Mazzone claimed that he had loaned his house for a New Year's Eve celebration by chauffeurs. The scandal broke out soon after that. Mazzone claimed that the girls were wearing underwear because they were poor and did not have swimsuits.

The city council interrupted their summer vacations and treated the case on January 12. They preferred to start an impeachment of Mazzone, rather than asking the governor of Salta for a provincial intervention. They already had such projects from before the scandal, related to corruption cases. Afterwards, they made the intervention request anyway, which was approved by both chambers of the provincial legislature, by an important majority. Mazzone was ousted from office and the city council was closed, and Matías Assennato became the new intendant.

Mazzone is also under judicial investigation for the case. The judge Antonio Pastrana heads the trial of child sexual abuse against Mazzone, Manuel Santiago Amador and Eliseo Elías Valdez. Prosecutor Ramiro Ramos Osorio mentioned that one of the girls told him that she was offered money in exchange of sex during the party. The girl also said that she had been threatened to say that Mazzone was with his family, and wearing trousers. She said that Mazzone had been drinking alcohol the whole party, that he wanted to play a sex game called "the shark", and denied Mazzone's claim about the use of underwear. The girls received partial witness protection, but not a permanent one.

The prosecutor investigated the cell phone of one of the girls, and retrieved 19 deleted photos, all showing people in underwear. No photos have been found of other people in the pool, or sharing an asado, as claimed by Mazzone's defense. The real identity of the Facebook user that released the first photos is unknown, as his account was created and then deleted in just 18 hours, and Facebook only reveals private information in cases of illegal drug trade or human trafficking.
