= 1978 Mauritanian coup d'état =

Military overthrow of Moktar Ould Daddah

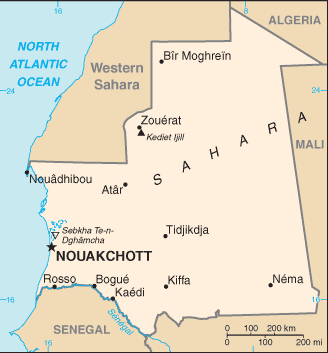
- A CIA WFB map of Mauritania
- Date: 10 July 1978
- Location: Nouakchott, Mauritania
- Type: Military coup
- Cause: Participation of Mauritania in the Western Sahara War
- Motive: Regime change
- Target: Presidential Palace, Nouakchott
- Organised by: Mustafa Ould Salek
- Participants: Faction within the Armed Forces
- Outcome: Coup succeeds: Overthrow of the One-party state Mauritanian People's Party.; Overthrow of the government of President Ould Daddah.; The establishment of military rule under the CMRN headed by Colonel Salek.

The 1978 Mauritanian coup d'état was a bloodless military coup in Mauritania which took place on 10 July 1978. The coup, led by the Army Chief of Staff, Colonel Mustafa Ould Salek, who commanded a group of junior officers, overthrew President Moktar Ould Daddah, who ruled the country since independence from France in 1960.

The main motive for the coup was Daddah's ill-fated participation in the Western Sahara War (from 1975 onwards) and the resulting ruin of the economy of Mauritania. Following the coup, Salek had assumed the presidency of a newly formed military junta, the 20-member Military Committee for National Recovery (CMRN).

Reports from the capital Nouakchott said no shooting had been heard in the city, and no casualties had been announced.

After a period of imprisonment, Ould Daddah was allowed to go into exile in France in August 1979, and was allowed to return to Mauritania on 17 July 2001.

== Background ==
Moktar Ould Daddah, the first president of Mauritania, was successful in forging a Mauritanian national identity with his Mauritanian People's Party (PPM). He pursued policy that was successful in balancing ethnic, cultural and political tensions.

The Mauritanian army was, in its early days, a small and largely apolitical force, with fewer than 3,000 personnel led by French-trained officers. It was a low-profile institution largely insulated from the various divisions beginning to fracture Mauritanian society. After 1966, Afro-Mauritanian elites (consisting of the Halpulaar, Soninke, Wolof, and Bambara) began opposing Ould Daddah's policies of Arabization that were contrary to the nation's acquired role as a bridge between African and Arab countries, for which it held a substantial amount of goodwill. The conflict escalated into riots and violence. In response, on February 10, 1966, Ould Daddah issued Decree 66028, granting Captain Mustafa Ould Salek sweeping powers to restore order in the capital. Ould Salek carried out the task with significant loss of life. French ambassador Jean-François Deniau warned the administration that the crisis risked politicizing the military. Deniau was concerned that elements within the armed forces might come to believe that the regime's survival depended on their continued support.

Beginning in the early 1970s, Ould Daddah attempted to replicate Guinea's civil-military model under the Parti Démocratique de Guinée (PDG) led by Sékou Touré in Mauritania. The model deeply integrated the military into the ruling party's political structures; armed forces were not just an instrument of national defense but "uniformed militants", soldiers who were also ideologically committed members of the single-party regime. Army Chief of Staff M'Bareck Ould Bouna Moctar opposed his designs, and Ould Daddah dismissed him from the position to install Ould Salek in his place. Deniau warned in vain that the model might not suit Mauritania’s fragile political balance. The PPM retained power in consecutive elections, but by often resorting to either absorbing or suppressing opponents that challenged its policies or control over political power.

== Coup d'état ==
In the mid-1970s, under the influence of King Hassan II of Morocco, Ould Daddah drew Mauritania into the Western Sahara conflict by staking a claim to part of the former Spanish colony. Mauritania suffered significant loss of life and financial ruin, its fledgling economy was crippled, and its international standing was damaged. Growing disillusionment within the military over an increasingly unpopular and unwinnable war culminated in a coup d'état against Ould Daddah on July 10, 1978.

As a consequence of the war, by the time the military seized power in 1978, it had expanded dramatically, with the fighting force growing from just 3,000 troops to over 17,000. In addition, by 1978, many officers involved in combat operations or weapons procurement had amassed significant personal wealth. In his memoir La Mauritanie contre vents et marées, Ould Daddah alleged that the July 10 coup was partly motivated by officers' fear of the accountability he had publicly vowed to impose days earlier.

The entire security establishment conspired to overthrow the regime. Police Commissioner Mamadou Ly was involved in the military junta, whose 17 members were drawn from all branches of the armed forces. The junta titled itself the Comité Militaire pour le Redressement National (CMRN). Within the Arab-Berber community, the coup was seen as both a revenge of warrior tribes over the scholarly Oulad Ebiery and a regional and ethnic shift, as southeastern Arab officers displaced the traditionally dominant northwestern elites, to whom Ould Daddah belonged.

== Aftermath ==
The 1978 coup in Mauritania marked the start of a prolonged period of military rule dominated by Arab-Berber officers. Ould Salek's initial attempts to restore civilian governance and include Afro-Mauritanians led to political tensions. His brief rule was followed by successive military regimes that maintained the marginalization of Afro-Mauritanians and Haratin populations.
