= Military Council for Justice and Democracy =

Supreme political body of Mauritania

The Military Council for Justice and Democracy (Arabic: المجلس العسكري للعدالة والديمقراطية; French: Conseil Militaire pour la Justice et la Démocratie, CMJD) was a supreme political body of Mauritania. It served as the country's interim government following the coup d'état which ousted the President Maaouya Ould Sid'Ahmed Taya on August 3, 2005. It was led by the former Director of the national police force, Colonel Ely Ould Mohamed Vall. After seizing power, it quickly pledged to hold elections within two years and promised that none of its own members would run.

A few days after seizing power, Ely Ould Mohamed Vall named Sidi Mohamed Ould Boubacar as Prime Minister following the resignation of Maaouya Ould Sid'Ahmed Taya's last Prime Minister, Sghair Ould M'Bareck.

A presidential election took place in March 2007 and the new President Sidi Ould Cheikh Abdallahi was sworn in on April 19, 2007.

Several members of CMJD later became members of the next Mauritanian military junta, the High Council of State when it came to power in the 2008 Mauritanian coup d'état under the leadership of general Mohamed Ould Abdel Aziz.

== Members ==
Portrait	Name	Elected	Term of office		Political party
	Ely Ould Mohamed Vall		2005	2007	Military Council for Justice and Democracy
	Mohamed Ould Abdel Aziz		2005	2007	
	Mohamed Ould Ghazouani		2005	2007	
	Abderrahmane Ould Boubacar		2005	2007	
	Ahmed Ould Bekrine		2005	2007	
	Sogho Alassane		2005	2007	
	Ghoulam Ould Mohamed		2005	2007	
	Sidi Mohamed Ould Cheikh El Alem		2005	2007	
	Negri Felix		2005	2007	
	Mohamed Ould Meguett		2005	2007	
	Mohamed Ould Mohamed Znagui		2005	2007	
	Kane Hamedine		2005	2007	
	Mohamed Ould Abdi		2005	2007	
	Ahmed Ould Ameine		2005	2007	
	Taleb Moustapha Ould Cheikh		2005	2007	
	Mohamed Cheikh Ould Mohamed Lemine		2005	2007	
	Isselkou Ould Cheikh El Wely.		2005	2007	

== See also ==
- Military Committee for National Recovery (CMRN) – Military Government in 1978–1979.
- Military Committee for National Salvation (CMSN) – Military Government in 1979–1992.
- High Council of State (HCE) – Military government in 2008–2009.
