= 2005 Mauritanian coup d'état =

Overthrow of Maaouya Ould Sid'Ahmed Taya

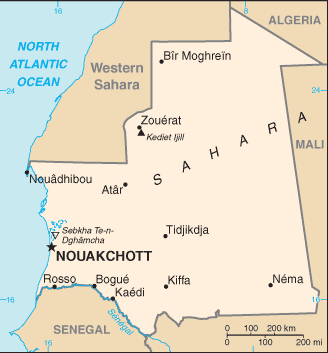
- A CIA WFB map of Mauritania
- Date: 3 August 2005
- Location: Nouakchott, Mauritania
- Type: Military coup
- Motive: Regime change
- Target: Presidential Palace, Nouakchott
- Organised by: Ely Ould Mohamed Vall
- Participants: Faction within the Armed Forces
- Outcome: Coup succeeds: Overthrow of the government of President Taya.; The establishment of military rule under the CMJD headed by Colonel Vall.; Taya goes into exile.; Election of Sidi Ould Cheikh Abdallahi as President in 2007.

A military coup took place in Mauritania on 3 August 2005. President Maaouya Ould Sid'Ahmed Taya was ousted by the Armed Forces of Mauritania and replaced by the Military Council for Justice and Democracy (CMJD), headed by Ely Ould Mohamed Vall, while Taya was in Saudi Arabia attending the funeral of King Fahd of Saudi Arabia.

A constitutional referendum, parliamentary and presidential elections were scheduled and the coup leaders vowed not to contest any of the elections. The military government ended with the presidential election on 11 March 2007 as promised.

== Background ==
Maaouya Ould Sid'Ahmed Taya had reigned over Mauritania since he had taken power from Mohamed Khouna Ould Haidalla in a bloodless coup d'état in December 1984.

Mauritania had also seen coup attempts in June 2003 and August 2004.

The 2003 attempt had been led by Saleh Ould Hanenna, and the August 2004 attempt was allegedly led by army officers hailing from Hanenna's ethnic group. Motives for the coup included Taya's alignment with America and being one of only three countries in the Arab world to start formal diplomatic ties with Israel. The coup was also motivated by opposition to Taya's suppression of some opposition parties and his occasional military purges.

== Coup details ==
While Taya was attending the funeral of King Fahd of Saudi Arabia on 3 August 2005, members of the Presidential Guard (BASEP) surrounded the Presidential palace and other important ministries. Shots were heard throughout the capital, clearing the streets of Nouakchott.

The coup leaders also took control of state-run radio and TV stations.

In an official message on Mauritanian television, the coup leaders declared, "The armed forces and security forces have unanimously decided to put a definitive end to the totalitarian acts in the past few years of the defunct regime under which our people have suffered greatly in the last few years."

== International reaction ==
Domestically, the coup had support from the population, with some in the capital honking their car horns in support.

The African Union expressed concern and condemned all seizures of power. The Secretary-General of the UN, Kofi Annan, "was deeply troubled", stating that he wanted the dispute to be resolved peacefully. The then President of Nigeria, Olusegun Obasanjo, denounced the coup, stating "the days of tolerating military governance in our sub-region or anywhere [are] long gone".

== Analysis and aftermath ==
The coup ended Ould Taya's repressive regime, which was characterized by a make-believe democracy heavily reliant on tribal affiliations and a powerful security apparatus. It was primarily driven by the military's withdrawal of support for Taya due to his increasingly erratic and unpopular policies, especially his use of the "terrorist card" to gain Western support, which alienated significant segments of the population.

Taya was on the plane back to Mauritania when the coup happened, forcing him to land in Niger. He eventually made his way to Qatar, and now works as a teacher at a Qatar military academy.

After the coup, the African Union demanded a return to "constitutional order" in Mauritania, and suspended Mauritania's membership in the African Union.

The Mauritanian military government ended after a fair presidential election was held in 2007, in which Sidi Ould Cheikh Abdallahi was elected. Mauritania's membership in the African Union was returned following the 2007 elections. However, after it was found out that Abdallahi had opened channels of communications with Islamic hardliners thought to be associated with Al-Qaeda, and had used public funds to build a mosque in the palace, he was overthrown by a coup in 2008 led by members of the 2005 coup, resulting in Mauritania being once again suspended from the African Union (AU).
