= Ahmed Ould Bouceif =

Mauritanian military officer and politician

Lieutenant colonel Ahmed Ould Bouceif
- أحمد ولد بوسيف

Prime Minister of Mauritania
- In office 6 April 1979 – 27 May 1979
- President: Mustafa Ould Salek
- Preceded by: Office reestablished (Moktar Ould Daddah prior to abolition in 1961)
- Succeeded by: Ahmed Salim Ould Sidi

Personal details
- Born: 1934
- Died: 27 May 1979 (aged 44–45) Off the coast of Dakar, Senegal

Military service
- Battles/wars: Western Sahara War

Lt. Col. Ahmed Ould Bouceif (Arabic: أحمد ولد بوسيف, 1934 – 27 May 1979) was a Mauritanian military officer and political leader. On April 6, 1979, he seized power in a coup d'état together with Col. Mohamed Khouna Ould Haidallah and other officers, ousting Col. Mustafa Ould Salek from real power, however kept in his symbolic position with no real power until June 3, 1979.

He became the 2nd Prime Minister of Mauritania in the new government. He died the following month when a DHC-5 Buffalo airplane of the Air Force, crashed off the coast of Dakar, Senegal, at which point Haidallah emerged as the regime's main strongman.

Political offices
| Preceded by Post vacant | Prime Minister of Mauritania; 1979 | Succeeded by Ahmed Salim Ould Sidi |
