= Military Committee for National Salvation =

Military government that seized power in Mauritania in 1979

The Military Committee for National Salvation (Arabic: المجلس العسكري للخلاص الوطني; French: Comité Militaire de Salut National, CMSN) was a military Government of Mauritania that took power in the 1979 coup d'état. It was installed by Mohamed Khouna Ould Haidalla, Ahmed Ould Bouceif and fellow officers, in an internal regime/military coup on April 6, 1979, removing Colonel Mustafa Ould Salek of the Military Committee for National Recovery (CMRN) from effective power. He was officially replaced by Mohamed Mahmoud Ould Louly in June 1979. Haidalla would later emerge as the main military strongman and go on to assume full powers in the 1980 coup d'état, only to be deposed by Colonel Maaouya Ould Sid'Ahmed Taya in the December 1984 coup d'état.

The CMSN remained as an Institution until 1992, when President Maaouya Ould Sid'Ahmed Taya introduced a democratic multi-party system following the 1991 constitutional referendum, – he himself lost power only in the 2005 coup d'état.

The main achievement of the CMSN was to make peace with the Western Saharan Polisario Front, which had been fighting Mauritania since the Government of President Moktar Ould Daddah entered the Western Sahara War in 1975. The CMSN opted for a full and complete withdrawal from the conflict, evacuating southern Río de Oro (which had been annexed as Tiris al-Gharbiyya) and recognizing the Polisario as the representative of the Sahrawi people; this led to a crisis in relations with Morocco, which had similarly annexed the northern two-thirds of the country, and was also facing Sahrawi resistance.

== See also ==
- Military Committee for National Recovery (CMRN) – Military Government in 1978–1979.
- Military Council for Justice and Democracy (CMJD) – Military government in 2005–2007.
- High Council of State (HCE) – Military government in 2008–2009.
