= Military Committee for National Recovery =

The Military Committee for National Recovery (Arabic: المجلس العسكري للإنعاش الوطني; French: Comité Militaire de Redressement National, CMRN) was a short-lived military Government of Mauritania after the coup d'état that removed long-time President Moktar Ould Daddah on July 10, 1978, until a second coup on April 6, 1979.

It was headed by Colonel Mustafa Ould Salek. It was followed by a second junta, the Military Committee for National Salvation (CMSN).

== See also ==
- Military Committee for National Salvation (CMSN) – Military Government in 1979–1992.
- Military Council for Justice and Democracy (CMJD) – Military government in 2005–2007.
- High Council of State (HCE) – Military government in 2008–2009.
