= 1984 Mauritanian coup d'état =

Military overthrow of President Haidalla

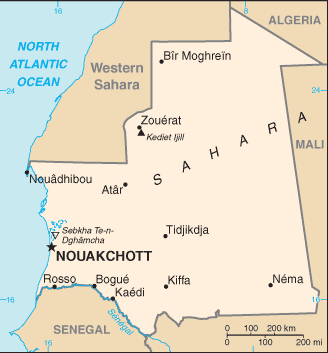
- A CIA WFB map of Mauritania
- Date: 12 December 1984
- Location: Nouakchott, Mauritania
- Type: Military coup
- Motive: Regime change
- Target: Presidential Palace, Nouakchott
- Organised by: Maaouya Ould Sid'Ahmed Taya
- Participants: Faction within the Armed Forces
- Outcome: Coup succeeds: Overthrow of Mohamed Khouna Ould Haidalla.; Taya assumed the presidency of the CMSN.

The 1984 Mauritanian coup d'état was a bloodless military coup in Mauritania which took place on 12 December 1984.

The coup was led by the Army Chief of Staff, Colonel Maaouya Ould Sid'Ahmed Taya, who seized power in the capital Nouakchott while the President, Colonel Mohamed Khouna Ould Haidalla, was out of the country. Haidalla was attending a francophone summit in Bujumbura, Burundi. Taya had assumed the presidency of the 24-member ruling Military Committee for National Salvation (CMSN), a military junta which was created following an earlier coup in 1979.

Reports from Nouakchott said the coup had caused no disruption and business remained normal. Military reinforcements were evident near the radio and television stations and a few public buildings, the reports said.

After initially fleeing to Brazzaville, People's Republic of the Congo, Haidalla returned to the country a day later, and he was arrested and imprisoned until 1988.
