= Mustafa Ould Salek =

Mauritanian politician (1936–2012)

- المصطفى ولد محمد السالك
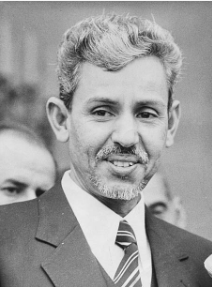

2nd Chairman of the Military Committee for National Recovery
- In office 10 July 1978 – 3 June 1979
- Preceded by: Moktar Ould Daddah (as President of Mauritania)
- Succeeded by: Mohamed Mahmoud Ould Louly (as Chairman of the Military Committee for National Salvation)

Personal details
- Born: 1936 Kiffa, Assaba Region, Mauritania, French West Africa
- Died: 18 December 2012 (aged 75–76) Paris, France

Military service
- Branch/service: Mauritanian Army
- Years of service: 1960–1980
- Rank: Colonel
- Battles/wars: Western Sahara War

Col. Mustafa Ould Salek (Arabic: المصطفى ولد محمد السالك; 1936 – 18 December 2012) was the president of Mauritania from 1978 to 1979.

== Biography ==
Mustafa Ould Mohamed Salek was appointed Army Commander by longtime President Moktar Ould Daddah in February 1978, as the country faced dire economic crisis and was failing to contain the Polisario Front's Sahrawi guerrillas after invading and annexing Western Sahara in 1975 in alliance with Morocco.

On 10 July 1978, Mustafa led a bloodless military coup d'état against President Moktar, and was appointed head of the 20-man junta, the Military Committee for National Recovery (CMRN) that was to rule and govern the country.

Seen as pro-French and careful not to break his country's alliance with Morocco, he failed to make peace with the Polisario (which had reacted to Daddah's downfall by entering into a unilateral ceasefire on the assumption that Mauritania would want to withdraw peacefully from the conflict). He also failed to address racial tension between southern Mauritanian Blacks and the northern Arab Moors, discriminating heavily in favour of the latter group, of which he was himself a member. Consequently, he became increasingly isolated within the regime and the CMRN. On 6 April 1979, a second coup by Colonels Ahmed Ould Bouceif and Mohamed Khouna Ould Haidalla reduced Mustafa to a symbolic and figurehead President in the replacement junta, the 24-man Military Committee for National Salvation (CMSN). On 3 June 1979, he was replaced as president by Colonel Mohamed Mahmoud Ould Louly.

Between 1981 and 1984 he was imprisoned, and he later stood as an independent candidate in the 1992 presidential election, gaining 2.9% of the popular vote.

He died peacefully in Paris on 18 December 2012.
