= Presidential Palace, Nouakchott =

Official residence of the President of Mauritania

Coordinates: 18°5′39″N 15°58′15″W

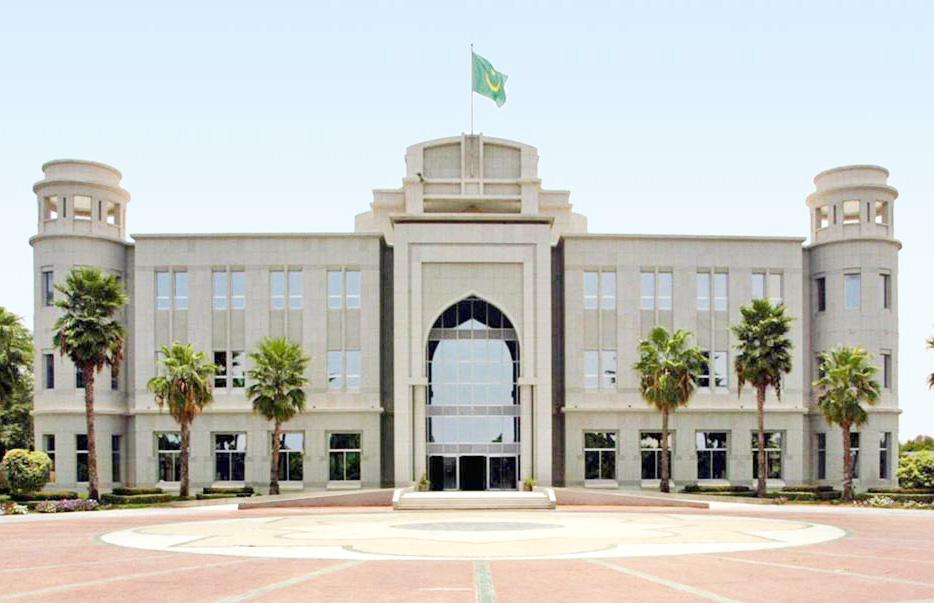
Façade of the Palace

The Presidential Palace, informally called the Grey Palace, is the residence for the President of Mauritania, located in Nouakchott. It is located in the centre of the city and is by far the most prominent landmark in the city, set in extensive gardens and grounds. It lies just to the northwest of the Lebanese International University, adjacent to the old US embassy. To the south is the headquarters of the Central Bank of Mauritania.

It was built with assistance from China.
