= Mohamed Khouna Ould Haidalla =

Former head of state of Mauritania from 1980 to 1984

- محمد خونا ولد هيداله
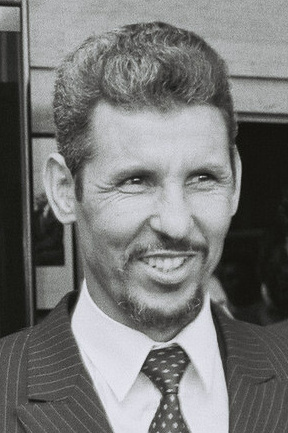

4th Chairman of the Military Committee for National Salvation
- In office 4 January 1980 – 12 December 1984
- Preceded by: Mohamed Mahmoud Ould Louly
- Succeeded by: Maaouya Ould Sid'Ahmed Taya

3rd Prime Minister of Mauritania
- In office 31 May 1979 – 12 December 1980
- Preceded by: Ahmed Salim Ould Sidi (Acting)
- Succeeded by: Sid Ahmed Ould Bneijara
- In office 8 March 1984 – 12 December 1984
- Preceded by: Maaouya Ould Sid'Ahmed Taya
- Succeeded by: Maaouya Ould Sid'Ahmed Taya

Personal details
- Born: 1940 (age 85–86) La Güera, Spanish Sahara or Nouadhibou, French West Africa

Military service
- Branch/service: Mauritanian Army
- Years of service: 1962–1984
- Rank: Colonel
- Battles/wars: Western Sahara War

Colonel Mohamed Khouna Ould Haidalla (Arabic: محمد خونا ولد هيداله Muḥammad Khouna Wald Haidalla; born 1940) is a Mauritanian former military officer and politician who served as the head of state of Mauritania from 4 January 1980 to 12 December 1984.

He was an unsuccessful candidate in the 2003 presidential election and the 2007 presidential election.

== Early life and military career ==
Born in 1940 in the Nouadhibou region (either in then-Spanish Sahara or colonial Mauritania), into a family of the Sahrawi Laaroussien tribe, he passed to secondary education in Rosso near the border to French-administered Senegal. He earned a baccalaureat in science in Dakar, Senegal, in 1961. After joining the Mauritanian army in 1962, he studied in French military colleges, notably Saint-Cyr.

After 1975, he commanded forces in the north of Mauritania and Tiris al-Gharbiya (Western Sahara), in the war against Polisario Front guerrillas, notably in the Zouerate region and Bir Moghrein. In 1978, with the country in severe disorder, he participated in a coup d'état that overthrew Mauritanian President Mokhtar Ould Daddah. As a member of the CRMN military junta, he was promoted to the post of Chief of the General Staff.

== As head of CMSN ==
Mohamed Khouna became prime minister on 31 May 1979, a few days after the death in an airplane crash of the previous prime minister, Col. Ahmed Ould Bouceif, with whom he had seized power for the CMSN just a month earlier, from Col. Mustafa Ould Salek and the CRMN. On 4 January 1980 he seized power from Ould Salek's successor as head of state, Mohamed Mahmoud Ould Louly. He continued to also hold the position of prime minister until December of that year, when a civilian, Sid'Ahmed Ould Bneijara, was appointed to the post.

His tenure was marked by severe political turbulence, as Mauritania extracted itself from the war with the Polisario Front — started by Ould Daddah in 1975 — and his regime faced a number of coups attempts and military intrigues. On March 16, 1981, a violent coup attempt against Mohamed Khouna failed. Mohamed Khouna accused Morocco of being behind the coup, which Morocco denied, and in the next month Maaouya Ould Sid'Ahmed Taya was appointed prime minister. Another attempted coup was allegedly sponsored by Libya.

On 8 March 1984, Mohamed Khouna took the office of prime minister again, replacing Taya, in a move to strengthen his personal power.

On December 12, 1984, however, Taya ousted Mohamed Khouna in a coup while the latter was out of the country. Mohamed Khouna had been at a Franco-African Summit in Burundi and learned of the coup in Brazzaville, during his return to Mauritania, from Denis Sassou Nguesso, the president of the Republic of the Congo. Mohamed Khouna returned to Mauritania anyway and was arrested at the airport in Nouakchott; he was eventually released in December 1988.

Taya promised to install democracy, but his rule was considered as authoritarian by many; he was deposed by a military coup in August 2005.

=== Foreign policy ===
Mohamed Khouna's main achievement was to make peace with the Western Sahara-based Polisario Front, which had been fighting Mauritania since it annexed part of the former Spanish colony in 1975. The CMSN opted for complete withdrawal from the conflict, evacuating southern Rio de Oro (which had been annexed as Tiris El Gharbiya) and recognizing the POLISARIO as the representative of the Sahrawi people. This led to a crisis in relations with the country's until-then ally Morocco, which had similarly annexed the remainder of Western Sahara, with Mohamed Khouna's government facing an attempted coup, troop clashes and military tension. Relations were completely severed between 1981 and 1985, when they were restored by Mohamed Khouna's successor. However, relations improved with POLISARIO's main regional backer, Algeria, with the Algerian government sending arms, ammunitions and supplies to bolster his regime. Mohamed Khouna's 1984 recognition of the Sahrawi Arab Democratic Republic (SADR, the POLISARIO's government-in-exile) as a sovereign nation appears to have been one of the triggering causes for Maaouya Ould Sid'Ahmed Taya's coup in late 1984.

=== Domestic policy ===
On the domestic front, his most notable policies were the institution of Islamic Sharia law in 1980-83, as well as several failed attempts to rebuild the political system shattered by the 1978 coup—first as a multiparty system, and then, after the first coup attempt against him, as a one-party state. It was also during Mohamed Khouna's rule that slavery was formally and completely abolished in Mauritania, although the practice continues at a diminished level still today. He made a statement announcing the abolition of slavery in July 1980, and this was followed by a legal decree in November 1981.

Political opponents were treated harshly, with imprisonments and those responsible for one of the failed coups against his government were executed.

== Activities after losing power ==
After returning to Mauritania in late 1984, Mohamed Khouna was held in administrative detention for several years by Ould Taya, during which time he fell sick. After his release, he stayed outside politics until 2003, when he returned to head the opposition. He then unsuccessfully ran for president against Taya in November, campaigning on a moderately Islamist platform, whereas Taya, who had established full diplomatic ties with Israel, was considered pro-Western. Mohamed Khouna officially came in second place with about 19% of the vote, although he alleged fraud; he was arrested immediately after the election, accused of plotting a coup. Mohamed Khouna had also been briefly detained just prior to the vote. On December 28, 2003 he received a five-year suspended sentence and therefore was set free, but barred from politics for five years. An appeals court confirmed this sentence in April 2004. Also in April, his supporters attempted to register a political party, the Party for Democratic Convergence.

Mohamed Khouna was arrested again on November 3, 2004, accused of involvement in coup plots. The prosecutor sought a five-year prison sentence, but he was acquitted on February 3, 2005, at the end of a mass trial of 195 people.

== After the 2005 coup ==
Following a military coup against Taya in August 2005, an amnesty in early September freed Mohamed Khouna from his sentences, along with more than a hundred others sentenced for political offenses.

On December 27, 2006, Mohamed Khouna announced that he would be a candidate in the presidential election scheduled for March 11, 2007. He campaigned on a nationalist-Islamist platform, citing the struggle against poverty and slavery as priorities. On February 3, he gained the support of another registered presidential candidate, former opposition politician and prisoner under Ould Taya, Chbih Ould Cheikh Melainine, who dropped out of the race.

However, no longer having the political base that came with being the main candidate of the opposition under Ould Taya, Mohamed Khouna was even less successful in the 2007 election, coming in tenth place and receiving 1.73% of the vote.

After the election, which was won by Sidi Ould Cheikh Abdallahi, Mohamed Khouna announced his support for Abdallahi in October 2007. However, following the coup that ousted Abdallahi in August 2008, Mohamed Khouna expressed his support for the coup in a statement on August 29, 2008, saying that it was necessary under the circumstances and urging all Mauritanians to support it. He also criticized the negative reactions of Western governments to the coup, alleging that they were interfering in Mauritanian affairs.

In July 2007, Sidi Mohamed Ould Haidalla (Mohamed Khouna's son) was detained in Morocco for drug trafficking charges. In 2008 he was judged and condemned to 7 years in prison.

On June 18, 2010, Mohamed Khouna wrote an open letter to the heads of state who have good relations with the king of Morocco, requesting for help to bring his son back to Mauritania or to liberate him. He denounced the conditions of imprisonment of his son, who is handicapped. On June 24, 2010, El Ghassem Ould Bellali, a Mauritanian deputy, declared that the imprisonment of Sidi Mohamed Ould Haidalla is a Moroccan "political vengeance" against his's father, for the recognition he gave to the SADR and to the right of self-determination of the Sahrawi people, when he was president of Mauritania.

Political offices
Preceded by Ahmed Salim Ould Sidi	Prime Minister of Mauritania; 1979–1980	Succeeded by Sid Ahmed Ould Bneijara
Preceded by Mohamed Mahmoud Ould Louly	President of Mauritania; 1980–1984	Succeeded by Maaouya Ould Sid'Ahmed Taya
Preceded by Maaouya Ould Sid'Ahmed Taya	Prime Minister of Mauritania; 1984	Succeeded by Maaouya Ould Sid'Ahmed Taya
