= List of Mauritanian regions by Human Development Index =

This is a list of regions of Mauritania by Human Development Index as of 2025 with data for the year 2023. An HDI value is calculated for the Trarza Region and the city of Nouakchott (comprising the regions of Nouakchott-Nord, Nouakchott-Ouest and Nouakchott-Sud since 2014) combined.

Rank	Region	HDI (2023)
High human development
1	Tiris Zemmour	0.720
2	Dakhlet Nouadhibou	0.700
Medium human development
3	Trarza and Nouakchott	0.671
4	Inchiri	0.633
5	Adrar	0.587
-	Mauritania	0.563
Low human development
6	Brakna	0.536
7	Tagant	0.530
8	Assaba	0.496
9	Gorgol	0.480
10	Hodh El Gharbi	0.471
11	Guidimaka	0.457
12	Hodh Ech Chargui	0.423
