= List of slums in Mauritania =

Slums in Mauritania

This is a list of slums in Mauritania.

- Arafat, Mauritania
- Dar-Naim
- El Mina, Mauritania
- Sebkha, Mauritania

== See also ==
- List of slums
