= Ministry of the Interior and Decentralization (Mauritania) =

Mauritanian ministry responsible for interior and decentralization

Islamic Republic of Mauritania Ministry of Interior and Decentralization
- وزارة الداخلية والامركزية; Ministère de l'Intérieur et de la décentralisation
- Emblem of Mauritania

Agency overview
- Jurisdiction: Government of Mauritania
- Headquarters: Nouakchott (Mauritania)
- Agency executive: El Moctar Ould Ahmed Bouceif, (Minister)
- Website: https://www.interieur.gov.mr/fr

The Ministry of the Interior and Decentralization is the national Ministry of the Interior of Mauritania. Its headquarters are located in Nouakchott, just south-east of the Presidential Palace, between the Chamber of Commerce and the College of Science and Technology.

Since October 10, 2026, the Minister of the Interior and Decentralization is El Moctar Ould Ahmed Bouceif.

== See also ==
- Decentralization
