= Freedom of religion in Mauritania =

Freedom of religion in Mauritania is highly restricted, as the country defines itself constitutionally as an Islamic republic and recognizes Islam as the religion of the State and its citizens. While non-Muslim expatriates are generally permitted to worship privately, public religious pluralism, proselytization, and activities perceived as contradicting Islamic principles are prohibited or tightly controlled.

== Religious demography ==
Official census figures identify 100% of Mauritanian citizens as Muslim.

In reality, 99.1% are Sunni Muslims, although there are a very few non-Muslims (approximately 0.9%). Roman Catholic and non-denominational Christian churches have been established in Nouakchott, Atar, Zouerate, Nouadhibou and Rosso, but these churches are officially restricted to expatriates only. A number of expatriates practice Judaism but there are no synagogues in the country.

== Status of religious freedom ==
Islam is generally considered to be the essential cohesive element unifying the country's various ethnic groups and castes. There is a cabinet-level Ministry of Culture and Islamic Orientation and a High Council of Islam, consisting of six imams, which, at the government's request, advises on the conformance of legislation to Islamic precepts.

Mosques and Qur'anic schools are funded privately by their members and other donors. One exception is a small stipend to the imam of the Central Mosque in the capital city of Nouakchott provided by the government.

The government does not register religious groups; however, secular NGOs, inclusive of humanitarian and development NGOs affiliated with religious groups, must register with the Ministry of Interior.

Nonprofit organisations, including both religious groups and secular NGOs, generally are not subject to taxation.

The judiciary consists of a single system of courts with a legal system that conforms with the principles of Shari'a (Islamic law).

The government observes Islamic holidays as national holidays. A magistrate of Shari'a, who heads a separate government commission, decides the dates for observing religious holidays and addresses the nation on these holidays.

== Restrictions on religious freedom ==
There is no religious oath required of government employees or members of the ruling political party, except for the President and the members of the 5-person Constitutional Council and the 10-person High Council of Magistrates presided over by the President. The Constitutional Council and the High Council of Magistrates advise the President in matters of law and the Constitution. The oath of office includes a promise to God to uphold the law of the land in conformity with Islamic precepts.

All schools except international schools are required to provide four hours of Islam education every week. Students completing the Baccalaureate exam must complete religious education in Arabic.

There are several foreign faith-based non-governmental organisations (NGOs) active in humanitarian and developmental work in the country. New laws in 2021 make it easier for faith-based NGOs to register and operate, but they are not allowed to proselytise or promote non-Islamic religions.

In April 2018, the National Assembly passed a law making the death penalty mandatory for "blasphemy". This follows laws which give the death penalty for adultery and homosexual activity, although these penalties have not been used since the 1980s.

== Proselytising to Muslims ==
Although there is no specific legal prohibition against proselytising by non-Muslims, in practice the government prohibits proselytising by non-Muslims through the use of Article 11 of the Press Act, which bans the publication of any material that is against Islam or contradicts or otherwise threatens Islam. The government views any attempts by practitioners of other religions to convert Muslims as undermining society. Foreign faith-based NGO's limit their activities to humanitarian and development assistance.

In June 2009, American aid worker Chris Leggett was murdered for allegedly proselytising, according to the Barnabas Fund.

=== Possession and distribution of Bibles ===
Under Article 11 of the Press Law, the government may restrict the importation, printing, or public distribution of Bibles or other non-Islamic religious literature, and in practice Bibles are neither printed nor publicly sold in the country. However, the possession of Bibles and other non-Islamic religious materials in private homes is legal.

Shari'a provides the legal principles upon which the law and legal procedure are based. Mauritania follows the Maliki madhab, which has certain unique laws not applicable to other madhabs.

== International views ==
In 2022, Freedom House rated Mauritanian religious freedom as 2 out of 4, noting that while apostasy is a crime punishable by death, to date, no one has been executed for the crime. However, in April 2018, Parliament passed a new law that strengthens the existing death penalty punishment for certain blasphemy offenses.
