= 2018 Nouakchott regional election =

2018 regional election in the capital of Mauritania

1 September 2018 (first round); 15 September 2018 (second round)	2023 →

All 37 seats in the Regional Council of Nouakchott 19 seats needed for a majority
- Turnout: 63.73% (first round); 40.76% (second round)
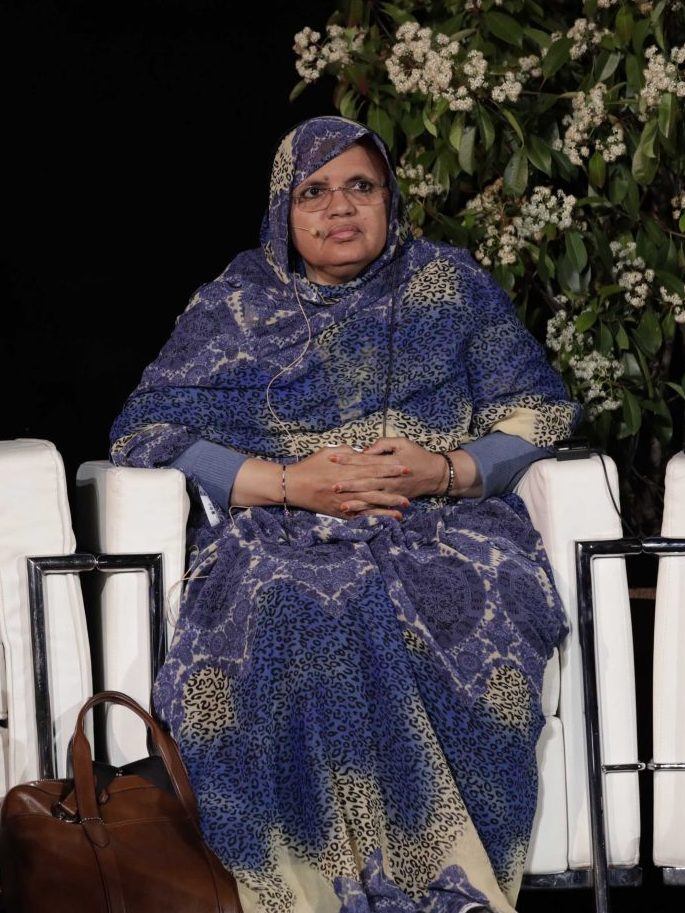

	First party	Second party
Candidate	Fatimetou Mint Abdel Malick	Mohamed Jemil Ould Mansour
Party	UPR	Tewassoul
Alliance		FNDU
Seats won	19	18
Popular vote	50,435	48,188
Percentage	49.09%	46.90%
Elected President of the Regional Council
Fatimetou Mint Abdel Malick
UPR

Regional elections were held on 1 September 2018, with a second round on 15 September 2018, to elect the 37 members of the newly-formed Regional Council of Nouakchott, created after the 2017 Mauritanian constitutional referendum in replacement of the Senate and the Urban Community of Nouakchott. They were part of the 2018 Mauritanian regional elections.

Ex-mayor of Tevragh-Zeina Fatimetou Mint Abdel Malick, running for the ruling party Union for the Republic won a narrow majority on the second round against Mohamed Jamil Ould Mansour, the opposition-backed candidate and previous leader of the Islamist Tewassoul party.

== Background ==
Mint Abdel Malick was first presented as candidate of the Union for the Republic on 8 July 2018 together with the rest of candidates to head the regional councils of the country.

== Election system ==
Regional councils in Mauritania are elected using the proportional representation system of the largest remainder method with two rounds. In the first round, voters choose from one of several lists running. If one list obtains an absolute majority of votes, the council seats would be then distributed proportionally. If not, a second round must be held between the two largest lists. The president of the Regional Council is elected by the Regional Council from one of their members.

== Results ==
Party	First round		Second round		Seats
Party	Votes	%	Votes	%	Seats
Union for the Republic	34,104	23.79	50,435	49.09	19
National Front for Democracy and Unity	32,281	22.52	48,188	46.90	18
Rally of Democratic Forces	9,737	6.79			0
Sawab–RAG	8,442	5.89			0
Alliance for Justice and Democracy/Movement for Renewal	5,000	3.49			0
El Islah	4,721	3.29			0
APP-led coalition (APP–El Wiam–ARC-EN-CIEL–AND–RIBAT)	4,488	3.13			0
Choura for Development	4,107	2.86			0
Union for Democracy and Progress	3,381	2.36			0
El Karama	2,611	1.82			0
Rally for Mauritania	2,583	1.80			0
National Democratic Union	2,528	1.76			0
National Democratic Convergence	2,219	1.55			0
Party for Conciliation and Prosperity	1,987	1.39			0
El Vadila	1,936	1.35			0
Third Generation Party	1,688	1.18			0
Popular Front	1,479	1.03			0
Other parties	15,329	10.69			0
Blank votes	4,749	3.31	4,114	4.00	–
Total	143,370	100.00	102,737	100.00	37
Valid votes	143,370	80.22	102,737	89.81	
Invalid votes	35,350	19.78	11,654	10.19	
Total votes	178,720	100.00	114,391	100.00	
Registered voters/turnout	280,627	63.69	280,627	40.76	
Source: CENI (first round), Essahra (second round)

== Members ==
Below is a list of members elected to the first Regional Council of Nouakchott and the party/coalition they were elected with.

Member	Alliance	Party	Gender
Fatimetou Mint Abdel Malick	UPR	UPR	F
Hemine Sidi Kedat	UPR	UPR	M
Aissata El Hadj Diallo	UPR	UPR	F
Mohamed Salem Habiboullah	UPR	UPR	M
Hawa Mohamed Al Amine	UPR	UPR	F
El Hadj El Man Jidou	UPR	UPR	M
Zeinabou Cheikh Ahmed	UPR	UPR	F
Ishemkhou Mahfouh Aleyou	UPR	UPR	M
Hawa Yoro Dia	UPR	UPR	F
Hamadi Mahfouh Bekaye	UPR	UPR	M
Toutou Mohamed Mahmoud Regad	UPR	UPR	F
Sadne Mouhamed Ahmed Vali	UPR	UPR	M
Amar El Weli Elati	UPR	UPR	M
Cheikhna Guewad Ahmed Benane	UPR	UPR	M
Cheikh Bocar Thiam	UPR	UPR	M
Mohamed Lemine Maaloum Vadel	UPR	UPR	M
El Bekaye Ahmed Lkweri	UPR	UPR	M
Mohamed Lemine Abdelkadr Bakayoko	UPR	UPR	M
Abdel Wedoud Mouhamdi Abdel Wedoud	UPR	UPR	M
Mohamed Jemil Ould Mansour	FNDU	Tewassoul	M
Ndeye Mbathio Niang	FNDU	MPR	F
Mohamed El Mokhtar Sidi	FNDU	El Moustaghbel	M
Mohamed Sid’Ahmed	FNDU	UFP	M
Khadije Dahman Jewde	FNDU	Tewassoul	F
Abou Hassan Dia	FNDU	PNDD-ADIL	M
Toumeneu Deye Zeine	FNDU	Tewassoul	F
Mohamed Mahmoud Memed	FNDU	HATEM	M
Hawa Diallo	FNDU	UFP	F
Saidou Mamadou Kane	FNDU	MPR	M
Marieme Tayfour	FNDU	El Moustaghbel	F
Hassan Mohamed El Abd	FNDU	Tewassoul	M
Zeinabou Sid’Ahmed	FNDU	PNDD-ADIL	F
Abdalaye Camara	FNDU	Tewassoul	M
Mohamed Ahmed Mohamed El Mokhtar	FNDU	HATEM	M
Dolo Mbow	FNDU	Tewassoul	M
Abdallahi Merzouk Baba	FNDU	UFP	M
Mohamed Massoud	FNDU	El Moustaghbel	M

== See also ==
- 2018 Mauritanian parliamentary election
- 2018 Mauritanian regional elections
