= 2023 Nouakchott regional election =

← 2018	13 May 2023	2028 →
- All 37 seats in the Regional Council of Nouakchott; 19 seats needed for a majority
- Turnout: 62.75% (▼0.98pp)
Party	Leader	Vote %	Seats	+/–
El Insaf	Fatimetou Mint Abdel Malick	35.41	13	−6
Tewassoul	El Hacen Ould Ileh	18.66	7	+1
Hope MR	Abderrahmane Ould Ehdaye	6.01	2	+2
Sawab–RAG	A. Salem O. A. Dekle	4.78	2	+2
AND	Ahmed Ould Salihine	4.42	2	+2
El Islah	Ahmed Ould Cheikh Sidiya	2.89	1	+1
CED	Ghary Ould Amah	2.85	1	+1
AJD/MR	Mamoudou Jaffar Ball	2.47	1	+1
UDP	Abderrahmane Ould Babah	2.02	1	+1
Ribat	Sidi Ould Eilal	2.02	1	+1
UFP	M. Mahmoud O. Moude	1.93	1	−2
RFD	Cheikhany O. S'Neid Oumou	1.74	1	+1
APP	Taleb Ould Mohamed El Abd	1.65	1	+1
PUD	Ch. Bouye O. Taghiyou Ellah	1.61	1	+1
El Karama	M. El Moc. O. El Moc. Salem	1.53	1	+1
HATEM	Mohamed Ahmed Ould Khaye	1.42	1	−1
This lists parties that won seats. See the complete results below.
President of the Regional Council before	President of the Regional Council after
Fatimetou Mint Abdel Malick; El Insaf	Fatimetou Mint Abdel Malick; El Insaf

Regional elections were held on 13 May 2023 to elect the 37 members of the Regional Council of Nouakchott, as part of the 2023 Mauritanian regional elections.

== Background ==
Regional councils were first elected in Mauritania in 2018 following a 2017 constitutional referendum that abolished the Senate, replacing it with regional councils in every wilaya and a single one for the city of Nouakchott.

Those first 2018 regional elections led to the ruling party Union for the Republic (which rebranded as El Insaf in July 2022) to barely take control of the Nouakchott's Regional Council. Ex-mayor of Tevragh-Zeina Fatimetou Mint Abdel Malick, running for the UPR, won a narrow majority on the second round against Mohamed Jamil Ould Mansour, the opposition-backed candidate and previous leader of the Islamist Tewassoul party.

On 26 September 2022 an agreement between the Ministry of the Interior and Decentralisation and all political parties registered in Mauritania was reached in order to renew the Independent National Electoral Commission and hold the elections in the first semester of 2023, with parties justifying it due to climatic and logistical conditions.

Mint Abdel Malick was presented as candidate for re-election by El Insaf on 20 March 2023 together with the rest of candidates to head the regional councils of the country.

== Election system ==
On 26 September 2022 all Mauritanian political parties reached an agreement sponsored by the Ministry of Interior and Decentralisation to reform the election system ahead of the upcoming elections after weeks of meetings between all parties.

In this election, regional councils will be elected in a single round using proportional representation through the largest remainder method, with no threshold being applied. The head of the list that gets the most votes will automatically become president of the regional council.

== Results ==
Regional Election 2023: Nouakchott
Party	Votes	%	Seats
El Insaf	72,217	35.41	13
National Rally for Reform and Development	38,059	18.66	7
Hope Mauritania	12,247	6.01	2
Democratic Alternation Pole (Sawab–RAG)	9,741	4.78	2
National Democratic Alliance	9,016	4.42	2
El Islah	5,904	2.89	1
State of Justice	5,803	2.85	1
Alliance for Justice and Democracy/Movement for Renewal	5,043	2.47	1
Union for Democracy and Progress	4,684	2.30	1
National Cohesion for Rights and the Construction of Generations	4,118	2.02	1
Union of the Forces of Progress	3,926	1.93	1
Rally of Democratic Forces	3,551	1.74	1
People's Progressive Alliance	3,372	1.65	1
Party of Unity and Development	3,286	1.61	1
El Karama	3,112	1.53	1
Mauritanian Party of Union and Change	2,906	1.42	1
Party of the Mauritanian Masses	2,747	1.35	0
El Ravah	2,482	1.22	0
Party of Construction and Progress	2,180	1.07	0
El Vadila	1,829	0.90	0
Centre through Action for Progress	1,588	0.78	0
Blank votes	6,133	3.01	–
Total	203,944	100.00	37
Valid votes	203,944	85.15	
Invalid votes	35,570	14.85	
Total votes	239,514	100.00	
Registered voters/turnout	381,668	62.75	
Source: National Independent Election Commission

== See also ==
- 2023 Mauritanian parliamentary election
- 2023 Mauritanian regional elections
- 2023 Mauritanian local elections
