= Regional Council of Nouakchott =

Regional legislature of Nouakchott, Mauritania

Regional Council of Nouakchott مجلس نواكشوط الجهوي Conseil régional de Nouakchott
- 2nd Regional Council

Type
- Type: Unicameral regional house

History
- Founded: 2018
- Preceded by: Urban Community of Nouakchott

Leadership
- President: Fatimetou Mint Abdel Malick, El Insaf since 13 October 2018
- First Vice-President: Hawa Sidibe, El Insaf since 10 June 2023
- Second Vice-President: Idoumou Abeidallah, El Insaf since 10 June 2023
- Third Vice-President: Beyrouk Ould Beyrouk, El Insaf since 10 June 2023
- Fourth Vice-President: Moussa Ould Souvi, El Insaf since 10 June 2023
- Fifth Vice-President: Ahmed Mohamed El Mamy Salihine, AND since 10 June 2023

Structure
- Seats: 37
- Political groups: El Insaf (13); Tewassoul (7); Hope Mauritania (2); Sawab–RAG (2); AND (2); El Islah (1); State of Justice (1); AJD/MR (1); UDP (1); Ribat (1); UFP (1); RFD (1); APP (1); PUD (1); El Karama (1); HATEM (1)

Elections
- Voting system: Closed list proportional representation
- First election: 1 and 15 September 2018
- Last election: 13 May 2023
- Next election: 2028

Website
- crn.mr

The Regional Council of Nouakchott (Arabic: مجلس نواكشوط الجهوي, romanized: majlis Nwākšūṭ al-jihawi, French: Conseil régional de Nouakchott) is the elected assembly of the city of Nouakchott, Mauritania.

It has been led since its creation by Fatimetou Mint Abdel Malick, of El Insaf.

== History ==
Regional councils were first elected in Mauritania in 2018 following a 2017 constitutional referendum that abolished the Senate, replacing it with regional councils in every wilaya, with the city of Nouakchott (which is subdivided in three wilayas) getting a single Regional Council replacing the Urban Community of Nouakchott.

== Election system ==
=== After creation ===
Regional councils in Mauritania were previously elected using the proportional representation system of the largest remainder method with two rounds. In the first round, voters chose from one of several lists running. If one list obtained an absolute majority of votes, the council seats were then distributed proportionally. If not, a second round was to be held between the two largest lists. The president of the Regional Council was elected by the Regional Council from one of their members.

=== After 2023 ===
On 26 September 2022 all Mauritanian political parties reached an agreement sponsored by the Ministry of Interior and Decentralization to reform the election system ahead of the upcoming elections after weeks of meetings between all parties.

In this election, regional councils are elected in a single round using proportional representation through the largest remainder method, with no threshold being applied. The head of the list that gets the most votes automatically becomes president of the regional council.

== List of presidents ==
Name	Party	Period	
Fatimetou Mint Abdel Malick	UPR	13 October 2018	10 June 2023
Fatimetou Mint Abdel Malick	El Insaf	10 June 2023	Present

== Historic composition of the regional council ==
Councillors in the Regional Council of Nouakchott since 2018
Key to parties UFP RFD Sawab–RAG Hope Mauritania MPR AJD/MR El Moustaqbel APP PNDD-ADIL Ribat AND El Karama El Islah PUD UDP UPR El Insaf HATEM State of Justice Tewassoul
Election	Distribution	President
2018	3 / 2 / 3 / 2 / 19 / 2 / 6	Fatimetou Mint Abdel Malick (El Insaf)
2023	1 / 1 / 2 / 2 / 1 / 1 / 1 / 2 / 1 / 1 / 1 / 1 / 13 / 1 / 1 / 7	Fatimetou Mint Abdel Malick (El Insaf)
