= College of Science and Technology =

College of Science and Technology may refer to:

- College of Science and Technology (Bhutan)
- College of Science and Technology (Mauritania)
- College of Science and Technology (Rwanda)
- Rajabazar Science College, Kolkata, India

== See also ==
- University of Science and Technology (disambiguation)
- Institute of technology
