= Dar Naim Prison =

Prison in Mauritania

Dar Naim Prison (French: Maison d’arrêt de Dar-Naïm) is a prison in Mauritania. It is located in the Dar Naim commune, a desert area 30 kilometres (19 mi) away from central Nouakchott.

Construction of Dar Naim finished in 2007, and it opened in June 2007. It was built to house 300 prisoners, and it replaced the previous prison located in central Nouakchott.

In a report, Amnesty International said "[E]very piece of information gathered by Amnesty International indicates that it was designed to inflict maximum suffering and humiliation on its prisoners" and "When the delegates visited Dar Naïm prison roughly six months after it opened, it was already in a deplorable state, marked by overcrowding and unsanitary conditions."
