= Saudi Mosque =

Mosque in Nouakchott, Mauritania

- Arabic: جامع المدينة المنورة
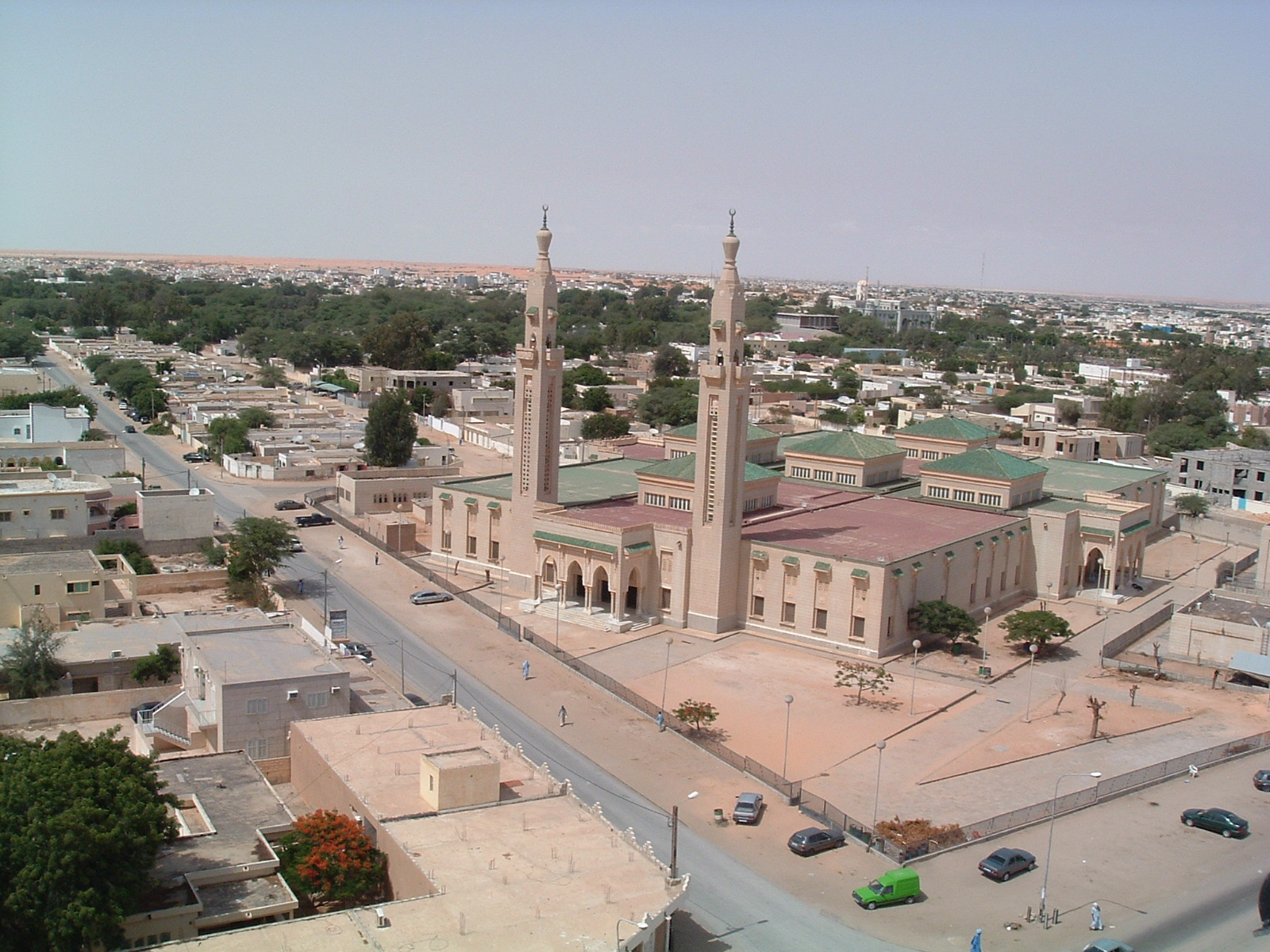
- The Saudi Mosque in 2007

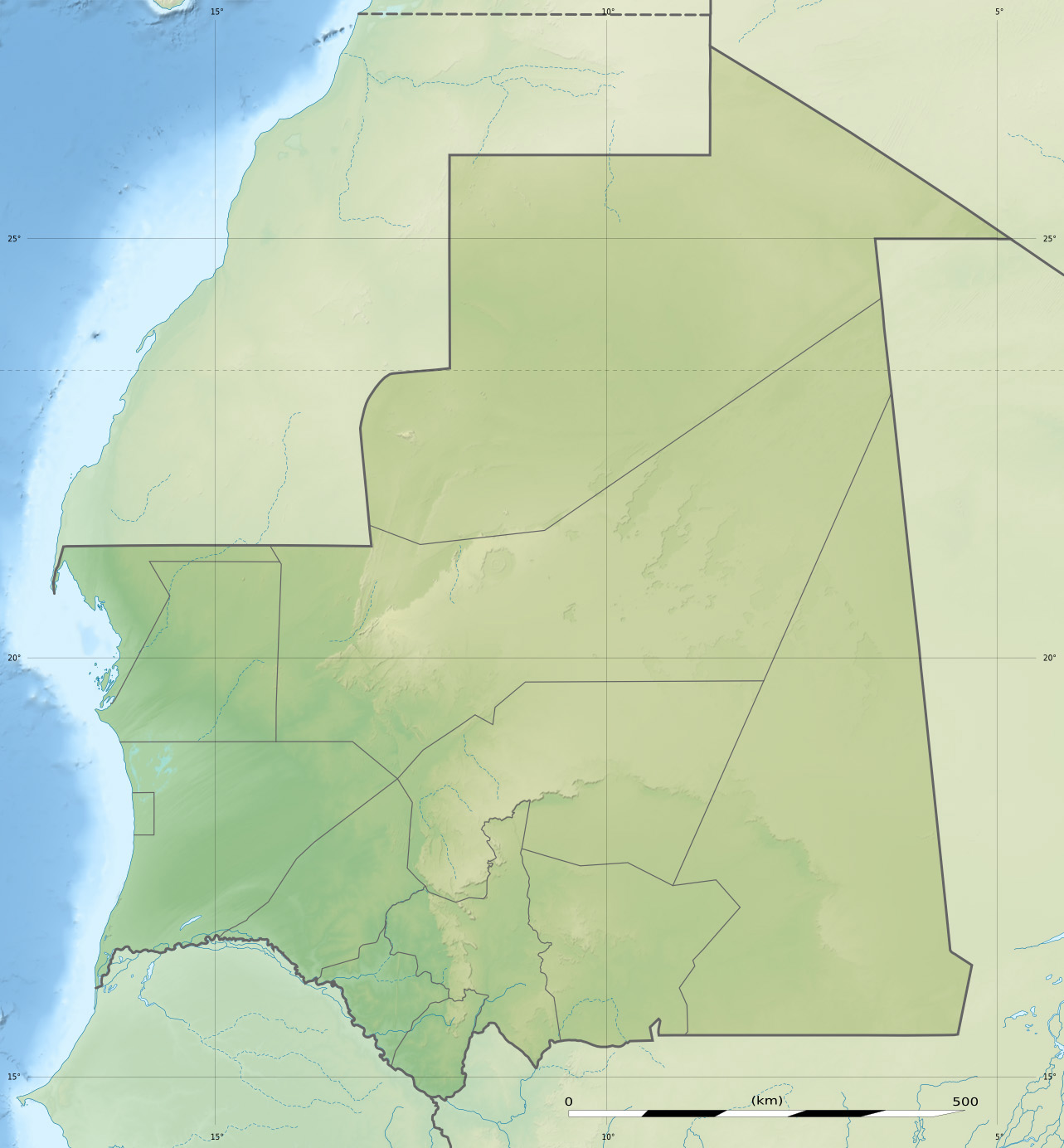
- Location of the mosque in Mauritania

Religion
- Affiliation: Sunni Islam
- Sect: Salafi movement
- Ecclesiastical or organizational status: Mosque
- Leadership: Imam Ahmedou Ould Lemrabet
- Status: Active

Location
- Location: Nouakchott
- Country: Mauritania
- Interactive map of Saudi Mosque
- Coordinates: 18°5′24″N 15°58′32″W

Architecture
- Type: Mosque architecture
- Completed: 2012
- Construction cost: US$88.76 million

Specifications
- Minaret: Two
- Site area: 54,000 m^{2} (580,000 sq ft)

The Saudi Mosque (Arabic: جامع المدينة المنورة: French: La Mosquée Saoudienne), also known as the Nouakchott Grand Mosque, is a Sunni Islam mosque in Nouakchott, Mauritania. It is located southwest of the Presidential Palace and immediately west of the Chamber of Commerce.

== Overview ==
The mosque was built with the assistance of the Government of Saudi Arabia.

For several decades, Bouddah Ould Bousseyri had been imam of the Saudi Mosque, he was a close associate of the Mauritanian regime and a supporter of Sunni Islam and a very influential figure in the apolitical Islamist camp. The current imam, Ahmedou Ould Lemrabet, is a thinker of politicized salafism and a supporter of state authority.

== See also ==
- Islam in Mauritania
- List of mosques in Mauritania
