= National Museum of Mauritania =

National Museum of Mauritania Musée National de Nouakchott
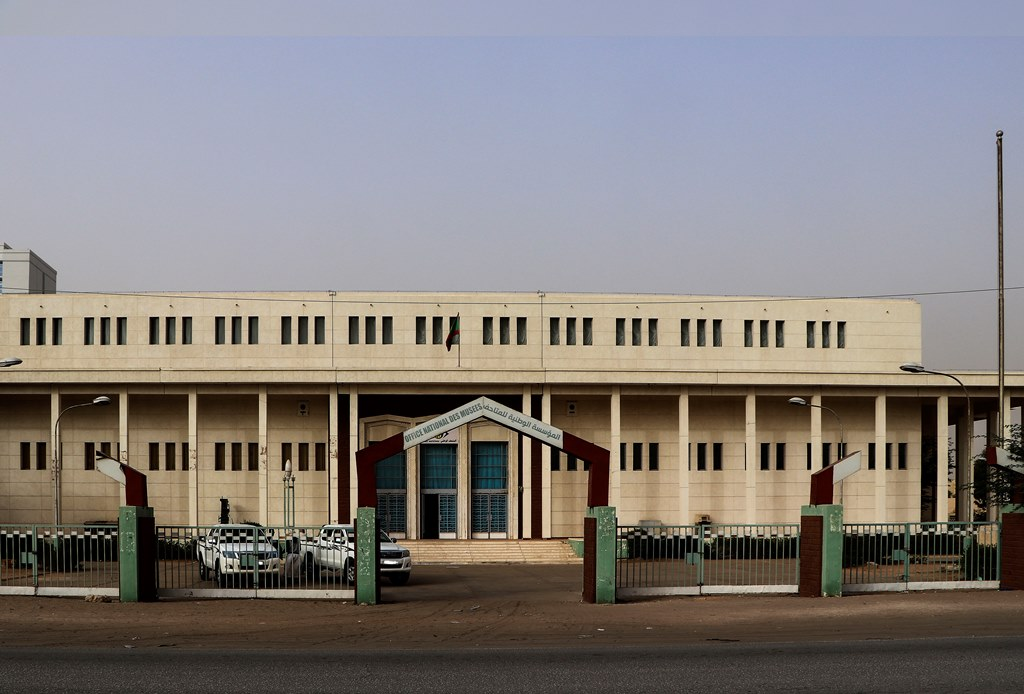
- Museum building
- Established: 1972
- Location: Nouakchott, Mauritania
- Coordinates: 18°5′8″N 15°58′29″W
- Type: national museum
- Collections: lithic tools, sherds, arrowheads, Mauritanian attire

The National Museum of Mauritania, also known as the National Museum of Nouakchott (French: Musée National de Nouakchott), is a national museum in Nouakchott, Mauritania. It is located to the southwest of the Hotel Mercure Marhaba, west of Hotel de Ville, northwest of Parc Deydouh, and northeast of the Mosque Ould Abbas.

The museum has notable archaeological and ethnographical collections. It contains two galleries that showcase collections of sherds, arrowheads, and local costumes.

== Building ==
The National Museum is housed in a two-storey building constructed in 1972 by the Chinese. The building also houses the Mauritanian Institute of Scientific Research, the Mauritanian Manuscripts Conservation Centre and the National Library of Mauritania. The museum consists of two permanent exhibition rooms and a temporary exhibition room.

== Collections ==
The museum's archaeological collections display Mousterian, Aterian and Neolithic artifacts as well as holdings from excavations carried out in several historic Mauritanian cities such as Koumbi Saleh, Aoudaghost, Tichit, Ouadane and Azougui. The ethnographic collections contain objects belonging to different cultures of the Mauritanian society.

== Gallery ==
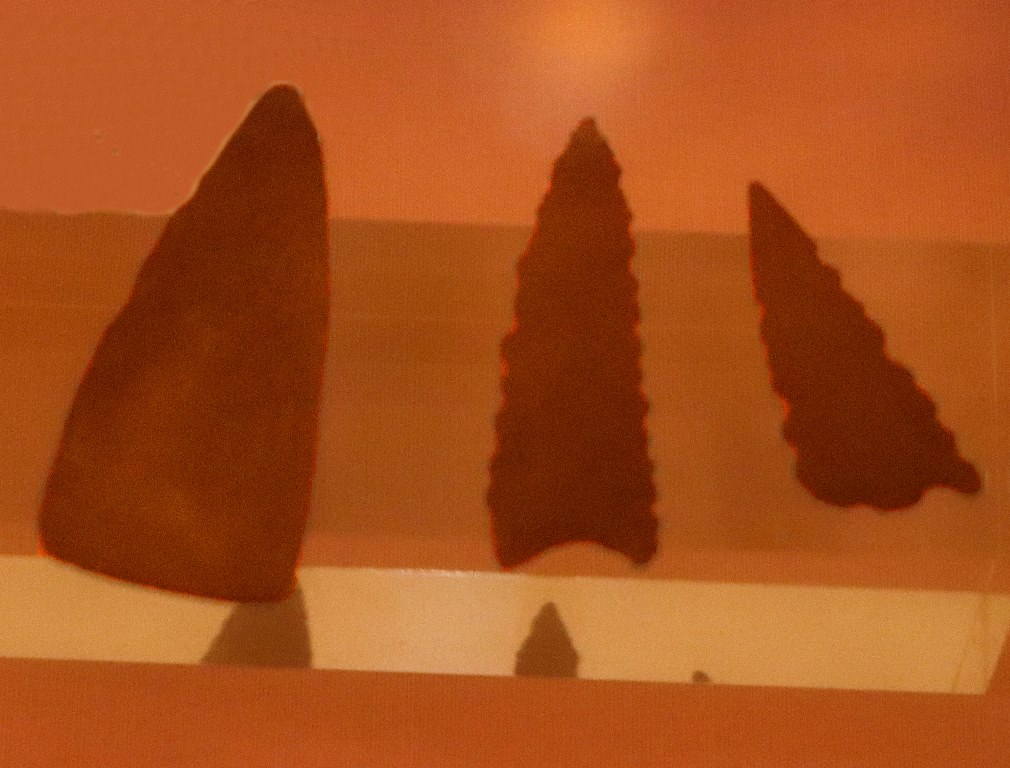
Polished shale tools Tichitt culture

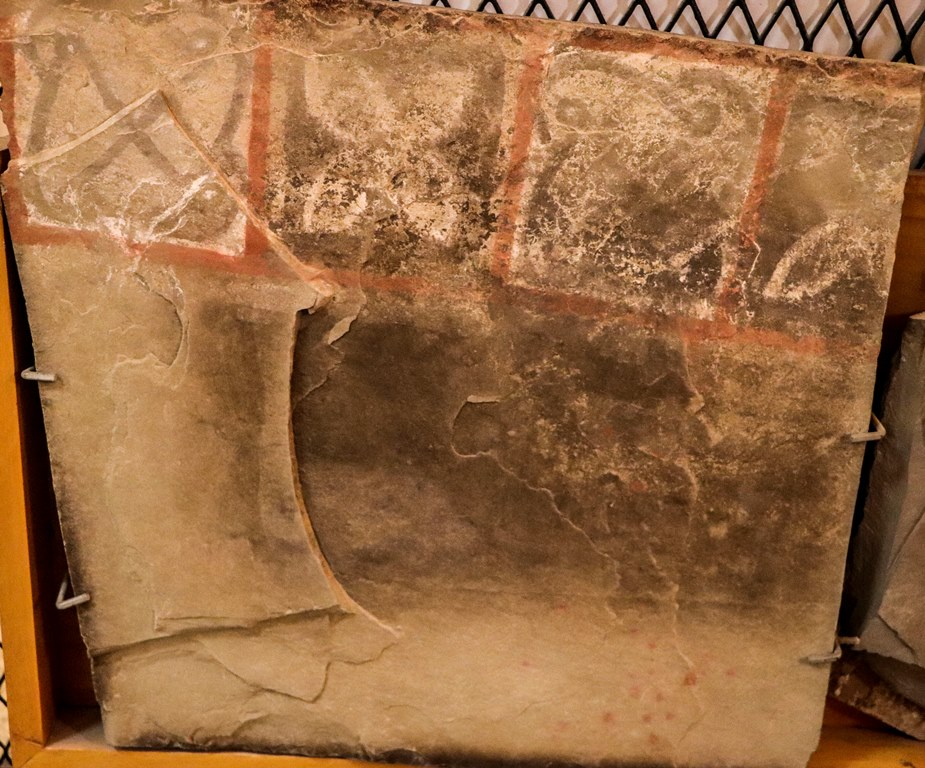
Epigraphic shale plate from Koumbi Saleh

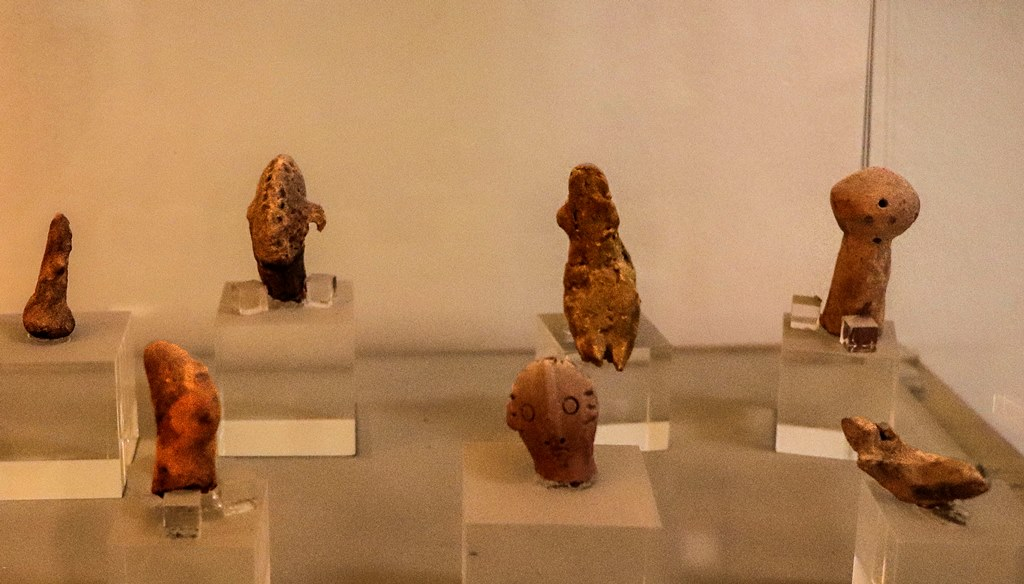
Small adobe statues

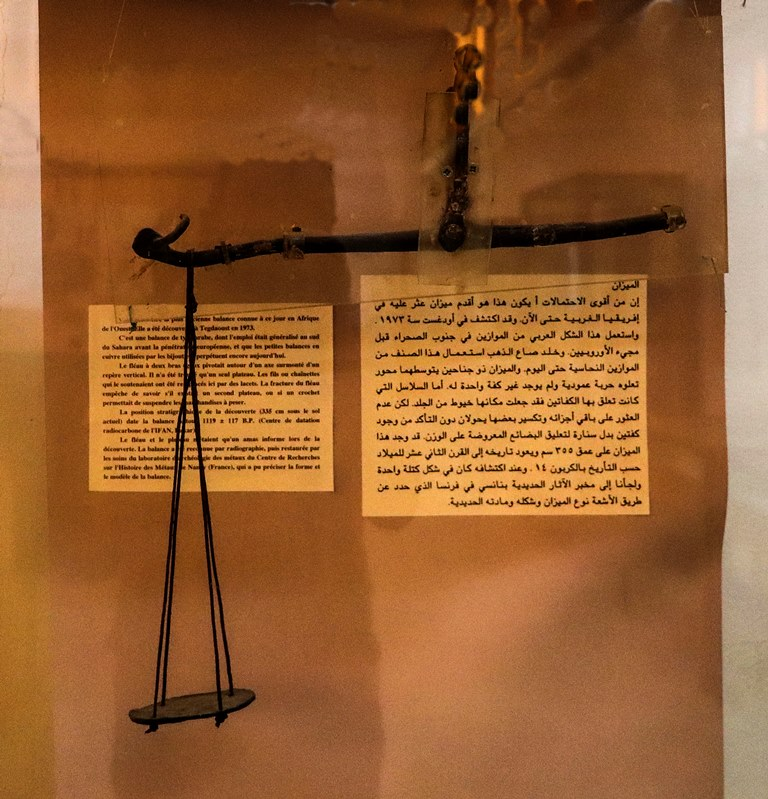
Arabic scale from the Sahel, 10th century

== See also ==
- List of museums in Mauritania
- National Archives of Mauritania
