= University of Science and Technology =

University of Science and Technology, Science and Technology University, or University for Science and Technology may refer to:

== Africa ==
- Botswana International University of Science and Technology, Gaborone, Botswana
- Egypt-Japan University of Science and Technology, Alexandria, Egypt
- Bayan College for Science & Technology, Khartoum, Sudan
- Enugu State University of Science and Technology, Enugu, Nigeria
- Kiriri Women's University of Science and Technology, Nairobi, Kenya
- Kwame Nkrumah University of Science and Technology, Kumasi, Ghana
- University of Medical Sciences and Technology, Khartoum, Sudan
- Uganda Military Engineering College, or University of Military Science and Technology, Lugazi, Uganda
- Masinde Muliro University of Science and Technology, Kenya
- Mbarara University of Science and Technology, Mbarara, Uganda
- Misr University for Science and Technology, 6 October City, Egypt
- National University of Science and Technology, Zimbabwe, Bulawayo, Zimbabwe
- Walter Sisulu University for Technology and Science, Mthatha, Eastern Cape, South Africa
- Regent University College of Science and Technology, Accra, Ghana
- Rivers State University of Science and Technology, Port Harcourt, Nigeria
- Sudan University of Science and Technology, Khartoum, Sudan
- University of Science and Technology Houari Boumediene, Algeria
- University of Science and Technology (Sudan), Omdurman, Sudan

== East Asia ==
=== China ===
- Anhui University of Technology and Science, Wuhu City, Anhui
- Changchun University of Science and Technology, Changchun, Jilin
- Changsha University of Science and Technology, Changsha, Hunan
- Chongqing University of Science and Technology, Chongqing
- East China University of Science and Technology, Shanghai
- Harbin University of Science and Technology, Harbin, Heilongjiang
- Hebei Normal University of Science and Technology, Qinhuangdao, Hebei
- Hebei University of Science and Technology, Shijiazhuang, Hebei
- Henan University of Science and Technology, Luoyang, Henan
- Hong Kong University of Science and Technology, Clear Water Bay, Sai Kung, Hong Kong
- Huazhong University of Science and Technology, Wuhan, Hubei
- Hunan University of Science and Technology, Xiangtan, Hunan
- Inner Mongolia University of Science and Technology, Baotou, Inner Mongolia
- Jiangxi Science and Technology Normal University, Nanchang, Jiangxi
- Jiangxi University of Science and Technology, Ganzhou City, Jiangxi
- Kunming University of Science and Technology, Kunming, Yunnan
- Macau University of Science and Technology, Macau
- Mongolian University of Science and Technology, Ulan Bator, Mongolia
- Nanjing University of Science and Technology, Nanjing, Jiangsu
- North China University of Science and Technology, Taiyuan, Shanxi
- Qingdao University of Science and Technology, Qingdao, Shandong
- Shaanxi University of Science and Technology, Xianyang, Shaanxi
- Shandong University of Science and Technology, Jinan, Shandong
- Southwest University of Science and Technology, Mianyang, Sichuan
- Suzhou University of Science and Technology, Suzhou, Jiangsu
- Taiyuan University of Science and Technology, Taiyuan, Shanxi
- Tianjin University of Science and Technology, Tianjin
- University of Electronic Science and Technology of China, Chengdu, Sichuan
- University of Science and Technology Beijing
- University of Science and Technology of China, Hefei, Anhui
- University of Science and Technology Liaoning, Anshan, Liaoning
- University of Shanghai for Science and Technology, Shanghai
- Shanghai University of Science and Technology, Shanghai
- Wuhan University of Science and Technology, Wuhan, Hubei
- Yanbian University of Science and Technology, Yanji, Jilin
- Zhejiang University of Science and Technology, Hangzhou, Zhejiang

=== South Korea ===
- KAIST (Korea Advanced Institute of Science and Technology), Daejeon
- University of Science and Technology, Daejeon, Seoul et al.
- Pohang University of Science and Technology, Pohang
- Seoul National University of Science and Technology, Seoul

=== Taiwan ===
- National Kaohsiung University of Science and Technology, Kaohsiung
- National Pingtung University of Science and Technology, Pingtung
- National Taiwan University of Science and Technology, Taipei
- National Taipei University of Technology, Taipei
- National Taichung University of Science and Technology, Taichung
- National Chin-Yi University of Technology, Taichung
- National Penghu University of Science and Technology, Penghu
- National Yunlin University of Science and Technology, Yunlin
- Chihlee University of Technology, New Taipei
- Lunghwa University of Science and Technology, Taoyuan
- Minghsin University of Science and Technology, Hsinchu
- Chung Chou University of Science and Technology, Changhua

== Europe ==
- Adana Alparslan Türkeş Science and Technology University, Turkey
- AGH University of Science and Technology, Kraków, Poland
- Gaziantep Islam Science and Technology University, Turkey
- Lille University of Science and Technology, Lille, France
- Turkish-Japanese Science and Technology University, Istanbul, Turkey
- University of Information Science and Technology "St. Paul The Apostle", Ohrid, Republic of Macedonia
- University of Manchester Institute of Science and Technology, Manchester, UK
- Norwegian University of Science and Technology, Trondheim, Norway
- National University of Science and Technology MISIS, Moscow, Russia
- Sivas University of Science and Technology, Turkey

== South and Southeast Asia ==
=== Bangladesh ===
- Atish Dipankar University of Science and Technology, Dhaka
- Bangladesh Army University of Science and Technology
- Ahsanullah University of Science and Technology, Dhaka
- Hajee Mohammad Danesh Science & Technology University, Dinajpur
- Jashore University of Science and Technology, Jessore
- University of Information Technology and Sciences, Dhaka
- Mawlana Bhashani Science and Technology University, Tangail
- Noakhali Science and Technology University, Noakhali
- Pabna University of Science and Technology, Pabna
- Patuakhali Science and Technology University, Patuakhali
- Pundra University of Science and Technology, Bogra
- Shahjalal University of Science and Technology, Sylhet
- University of Science and Technology Chittagong

=== India ===
- Cochin University of Science and Technology, Kochi
- Deenbandhu Chhotu Ram University of Science and Technology, Murthal, Haryana
- Guru Jambheshwar University of Science and Technology, Hisar, Haryana
- Islamic University of Science & Technology, Awantipora, Jammu and Kashmir
- University of Science and Technology, Meghalaya, Meghalaya
- Nirma University of Science and Technology, Ahmedabad

=== Pakistan ===
- Kohat University of Science & Technology, Kohat
- Mirpur University of Science & Technology, Mirpur, Azad Kashmir
- National University of Sciences and Technology (Pakistan), Islamabad
- Quaid-e-Awam University of Engineering, Science & Technology, Nawabshah
- Sarhad University of Science & Information Technology, Peshawar
- University of Science & Technology Bannu

=== Philippines ===
- University of Science and Technology of Southern Philippines, Cagayan de Oro
- Nueva Ecija University of Science and Technology, Cabanatuan

=== Elsewhere in Southeast Asia ===
- Asian University, Chonburi, Thailand; originally known as Asian University of Science and Technology
- Hanoi University of Science and Technology, Hanoi, Vietnam

== United States ==
- Harrisburg University of Science and Technology, Harrisburg, Pennsylvania
- Iowa State University, Ames, Iowa,; officially known as Iowa State University of Science and Technology
- Missouri University of Science and Technology, Rolla, Missouri

== Western Asia ==
- Ajman University of Science and Technology, Ajman, United Arab Emirates
- Al Ain University of Science and Technology, Al Ain, United Arab Emirates
- American University of Science and Technology, Beirut, Lebanon
- Arts, Sciences and Technology University in Lebanon, Beirut, Lebanon
- Gulf University for Science and Technology, Kuwait
- International University for Science and Technology, Oum El Qusur, Syria
- Iran University of Science and Technology, Tehran, Iran
- Jordan University of Science and Technology, Ar Ramtha, Jordan
- King Abdullah University of Science and Technology, Thuwal, Saudi Arabia
- Mazandaran University of Science and Technology, Babol, Iran
- University of Science and Technology (Yemen), founded in 1992
- National University of Science and Technology (Oman)

== See also ==
- College of Science and Technology (disambiguation)
- Institute of technology
