= List of museums in Mauritania =

This is a list of museums in Mauritania.

== List ==
- National Museum of Mauritania
- Musée de Medicine Traditionnelle de Mauritanie
- Museum of Ouadane

== See also ==
- List of museums by country
