= Toujounine =

- Commune and city
- Location in Mauritania
- Coordinates: 18°7′40″N 15°56′21″W
- Country: Mauritania
- Region: Nouakchott-Nord

Area
  - Total: 12.27 sq mi (31.77 km^{2})

Population (2013 census)
  - Total: 144,041
  - Density: 11,740/sq mi (4,534/km^{2})
- Time zone: UTC+0 (GMT)

Toujounine is a suburb of Nouakchott and urban commune in western Mauritania.

It had a population of 144,041 in 2013, up from 56,064 in 2000.
