= National Library of Mauritania =

- Bibliothèque Nationale de Mauritanie
- 18.0859°N 15.975°W
- Location: Nouakchott
- Type: National library
- Established: 1965
- Branches: 7

Collection
- Size: 10,000 volumes
- Legal deposit: Yes

Other information
- Director: Mohamed Mahmoud Ould
- Employees: 41

The Bibliothèque Nationale de Mauritanie (English: National Library of Mauritania, Arabic: المكتبة الوطنية الموريتانية) is located in Nouakchott, Mauritania in the building of the National Museum of Mauritania. The library has a collection of 10,000 volumes and employs 41 staff members.

The library has seven branches.

== See also ==
- National Archives of Mauritania
- List of national libraries

== Bibliography ==
- Adam Heymowski [in Polish] (1965), Organisation de la Bibliothèque nationale de Mauritanie, Nouakchott (PDF) (in French), Paris: Unesco
- Adam Heymowski (1972), Organisation de la Bibliothèque nationale de Mauritanie à Nouakchott: deuxieme mission (PDF) (in French), Paris: Unesco
- Marcel Lajeunesse, ed. (2008). "Mauritanie". Les Bibliothèques nationales de la francophonie (PDF) (in French) (3rd ed.). Bibliothèque et Archives nationales du Québec. OCLC 401164333.
