= Riyad, Mauritania =

Riyad
- Commune and city
- Location in Mauritania
- Coordinates: 18°6′8″N 15°57′18″W
- Country: Mauritania
- Region: Nouakchott-Sud

Area
  - Total: 6.90 sq mi (17.86 km^{2})

Population (2013 census)
  - Total: 117,030
  - Density: 16,970/sq mi (6,553/km^{2})
- Time zone: UTC+0 (GMT)

Riyad is a suburb of Nouakchott and urban commune in western Mauritania.

It had a population of 117,030 in 2013, up from 42,413 in 2000.
