= Friendship Port of Nouakchott =

- Interactive map of Friendship Port of Nouakchott

Location
- Country: Mauritania
- Location: Nouakchott

Details
- Opened: 1986
- Type of Harbor: Artificial

Statistics
- Annual cargo tonnage: 1,500,000 DWT

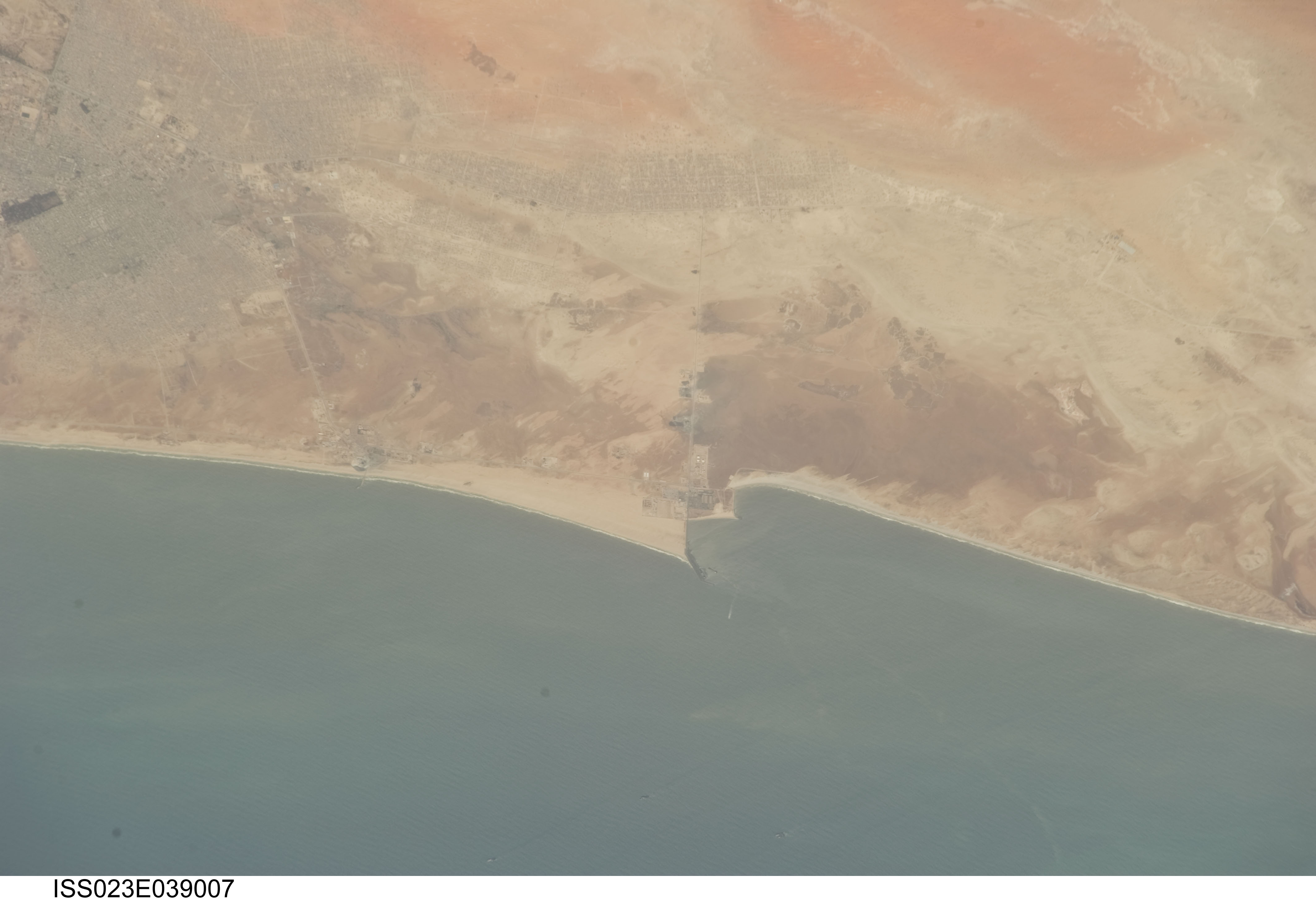

The Friendship Port (Port de l'Amité) is an artificial deepwater port located in Nouakchott, Mauritania. It was built during the 1980s by a Chinese company to allow the city, capital of Mauritania, to be supplied more cheaply than by overland from Dakar, Senegal. As the location is not a natural harbor, concrete block breakwaters had to be used to create a safe location for the ships. Plans are being made to increase its capacity.

== History ==
There are no natural deepwater ports along the Atlantic coast of Africa between Nouadhibou, Mauritania and Dakar, Senegal and the explosive growth of Nouakchott during the 1970s and 1980s threatened to overwhelm the modest road network connecting Nouakchott and Senegal. The People's Republic of China offered an interest-free, 50-year loan of $35 million in the early 1980s to finance construction of a port by the China Road & Bridge Corporation. It imported over 400 workers that had to emplace over 100,000 concrete blocks that each weighed over 12 long tons (12.2 t). The workers had to fight high seas and winds, sandstorms and strong currents along the unprotected coastline roughly 12 kilometers (7.5 mi) southwest of the city. Despite these difficulties, the facilities were completed several months ahead of schedule and the port opened on 17 September 1986. At the time, it was the second largest Chinese foreign aid project. The completed port became Mauritania's first deep-water port.

In 2001, Spain announced that it would build an oil terminal near the port to handle the country's increasing demands. Two years later Mali said that it would construct 92,000 square meters (990,000 sq ft) of warehouse space to handle its own imports and exports through the port.

== Capacity and facilities ==
The port was designed for a capacity of 500,000 deadweight tons (DWT) of cargo a year, but was handling 1,500,000 tons (DWT) by 2009. The main quay is long enough to accommodate three ships at once, each of 10,000 DWT. China agreed in 2009 to invest US$282 million in the port, aiming to extend the 585-meter-long (1,919 ft) main quay by over 900 meters (3,000 ft). As of 2011, the World Bank was investigating funding a new shipping container facility at the port.
