= Teyarett =

Teyarett تيارت
- Commune and city
- Location in Mauritania
- Coordinates: 18°7′40″N 15°56′21″W
- Country: Mauritania
- Region: Nouakchott-Nord

Area
  - Total: 7.83 sq mi (20.27 km^{2})

Population (2013 census)
  - Total: 78,828
  - Density: 10,070/sq mi (3,889/km^{2})
- Time zone: UTC+0 (GMT)

Teyarett (Arabic: تيارت) is a suburb of Nouakchott and urban commune in western Mauritania.

It has a population of 78,828 in 2013.
