= Maty Mint Hamady =

Maty Mint Hamady (born 1967) is a Mauritanian economist and politician who has been Mayor of Nouakchott, the capital and largest city of Mauritania, since 2014. Previously she was Minister of Public Service, Labour and Modernization of Administration from 2011 to 2013.

== Early life ==
Hamady was born in 1967 in Ayoun el Atrous and grew up in a politically active family. Attending a high school in Nouakchott, she earned her baccalauréat in 1986. She continued her studies in Mauritania and studied economics, earning a bachelor's degree in 1988 at the University of Nouakchott. She specialized in public economics and received her MA in 1990.

== Career ==
In 1991, Hamady began working for the municipality of Nouakchott in the Financial Management division. She became head of the division of the tax census in 1993, and in 1997 she was promoted to head of the department of external relations. In 1999, Hamady became an auditor for the Court of Auditors. She joined the Ministry of Trade and Industry in 2006 and the Central Bank. She served for two years as Director of Competition, Consumer Protection and Fraud Control at the Ministry and subsequently became a member of the Monetary Policy Council of the Central Bank of Mauritania in 2007. In 2009, Hamady became assistant director of SONIMEX, an import and export company. The following year she was made a Commissioner of Investment Promotion. She conducted a meeting of Qatari and Iranian investors and offered her help to achieve their investment projects.

She was appointed as Minister of Public Service, Labour and Modernization of Administration in March 2011. In August 2011, the government increased the minimum wage from 21,000 to 30,000 UM. She served in her ministerial post until December 2013.

On 4 February 2014, Hamady was elected as Mayor of Nouakchott, becoming the first female mayor in the city's history (but not in the history of Mauritania). She defeated Mohamed Ould Elhacen from the moderate Islamist party Tewassoul. "My election is a distinction message of Mauritanian women," she said.

== Personal life ==
She is married and has three children. Hamady speaks Arabic and French.
