= Ksar, Mauritania =

Ksar
- Commune and city
- Location in Mauritania
- Coordinates: 18°6′8″N 15°57′18″W
- Country: Mauritania
- Region: Nouakchott-Ouest

Population
  - Total: 43,531
- Time zone: UTC+0 (GMT)

Ksar, Mauritania is a suburb of Nouakchott and urban commune in western Mauritania.

It has a population of 43,531.
