= Nouakchott fish market =

Market in Nouakchott, Mauritania

Coordinates: 18°6′12″N 16°1′34″W

The Nouakchott fish market is a market on the coast in the western part of Nouakchott, Mauritania, about 5 kilometres (3.1 mi) from the city center. It is a landing site of artisanal fishing practitioners.

== Description ==
The Nouakchott fish market serves as a central hub for fish products, acting as a key destination for fishermen along the west coast of the capital, strategically located near the city center and in the presence of major fish processing factories. The market features external facilities dedicated to retailers and fish scalers, along with a building housing storage rooms for products. 12 wholesalers operate private fish processing factories within the market zone, responsible for processing, packaging, and storing halieutic products for export. The market offers a variety of fish species, including 36 pelagic and demersal species, 7 crustacean species and 7 species of molluscs. A 2022 study published in the Emirates Journal of Food and Agriculture found that fish products sold at the Nouakchott fish market are of good quality and safe for human consumption.

As part of infrastructure support for the fishing sector, a 3.5 kilometres (2.2 mi) enclosure with a large entrance and 5 exit routes was constructed around the maritime area of the Nouakchott fish market have been constructed. The program also funded improvements in the market's electrical energy, including the installation of 5 stations and a public lighting network, as well as a water supply network. 300 homes were built for the 8,000 residents living at the market as of February 2020.

A 2020 study published in the Journal of Applied Science and Environmental Studies noted that the hygiene standards in the facilities allocated to retailers were inadequate and that there was a need for enhancements in transportation and storage conditions.

It is described by Lonely Planet as "incredibly lively and extremely colorful" and having "teams of men, mostly Wolof and Fula, dragging in heavy hand-knotted fishing nets and small boys hurrying back and forth with trays of fish".

== Gallery ==
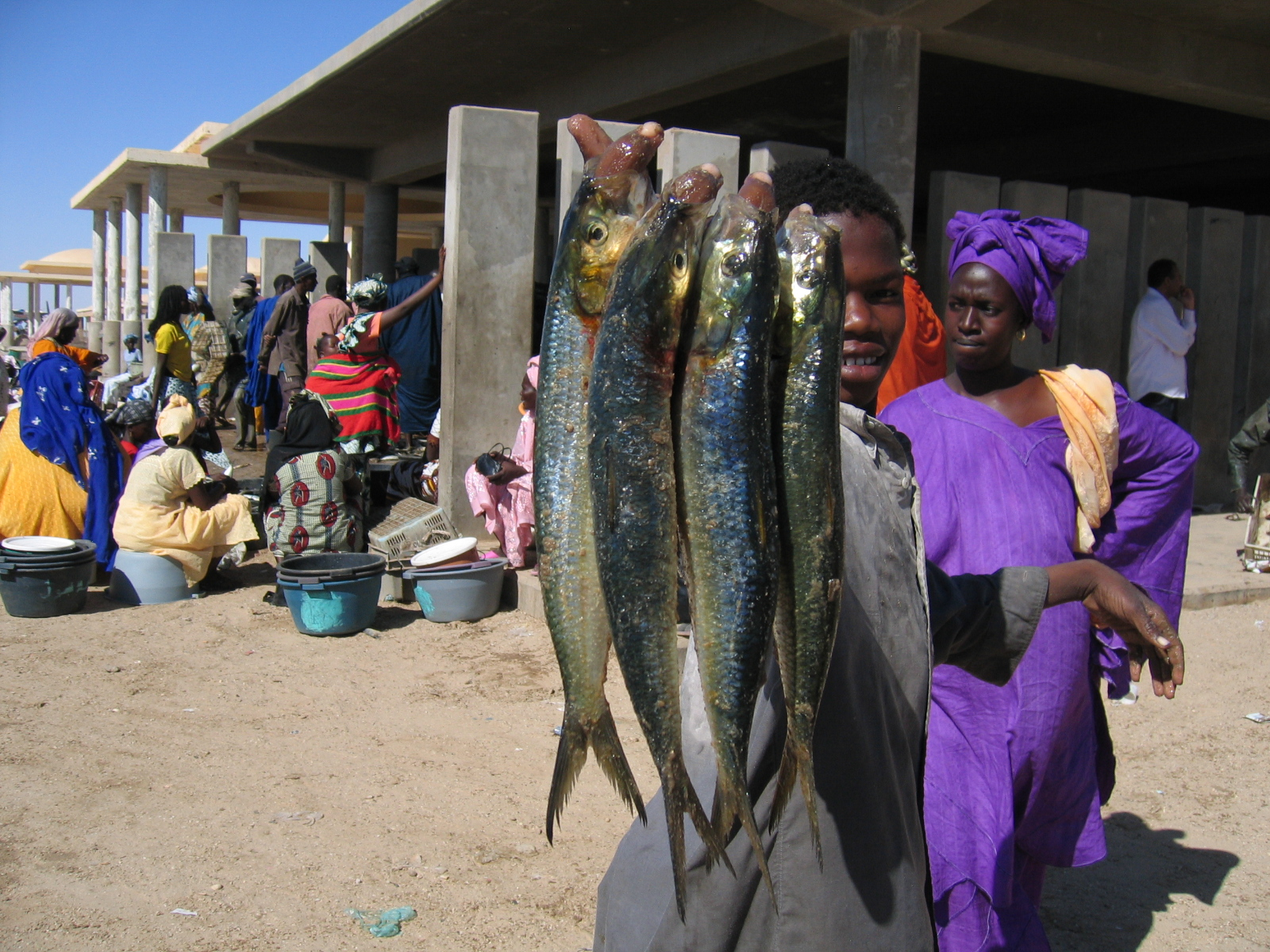
Boy displaying a couple of fish at the Nouakchott fish market

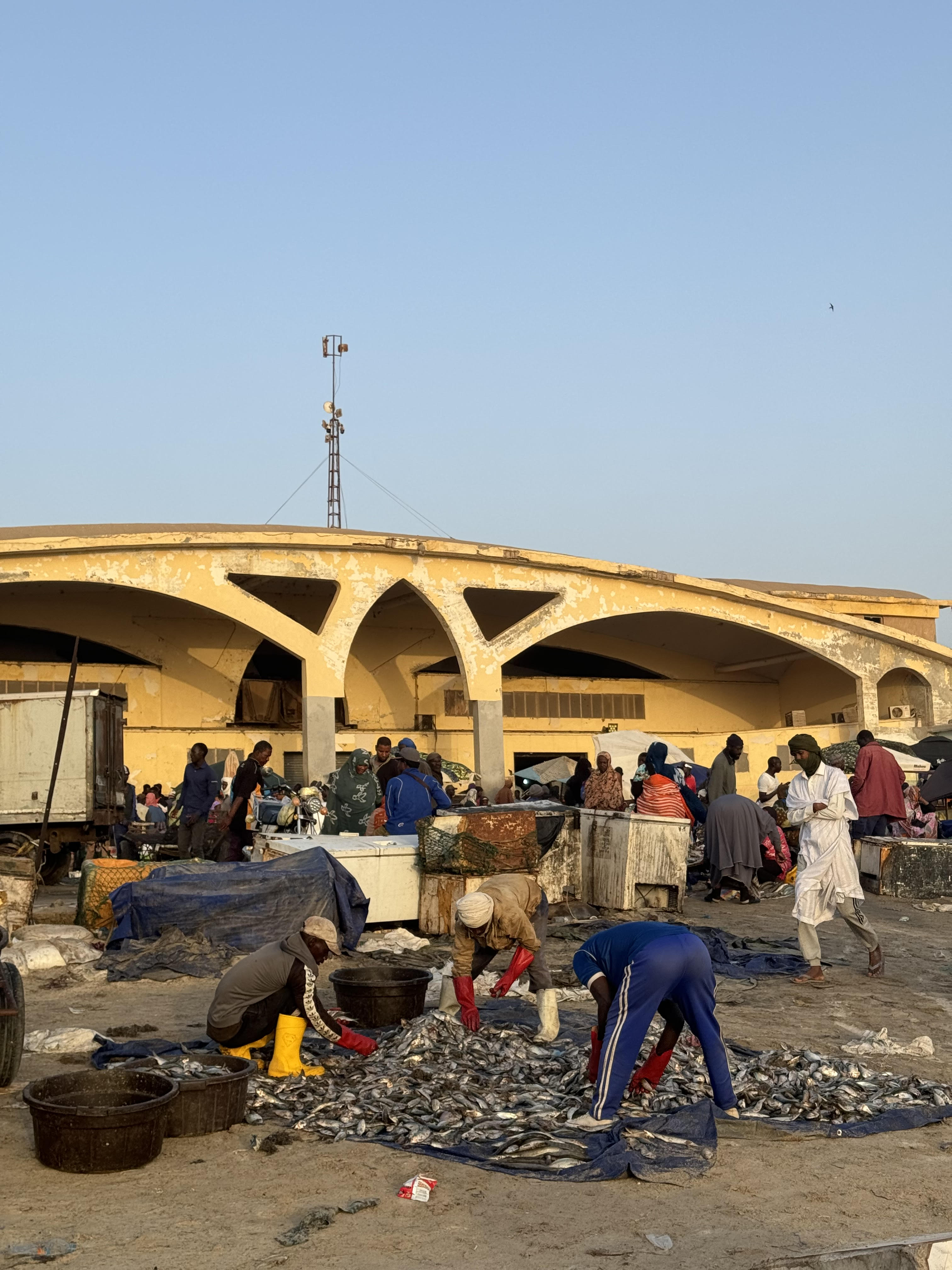
Scenes at the Nouakchott fish market

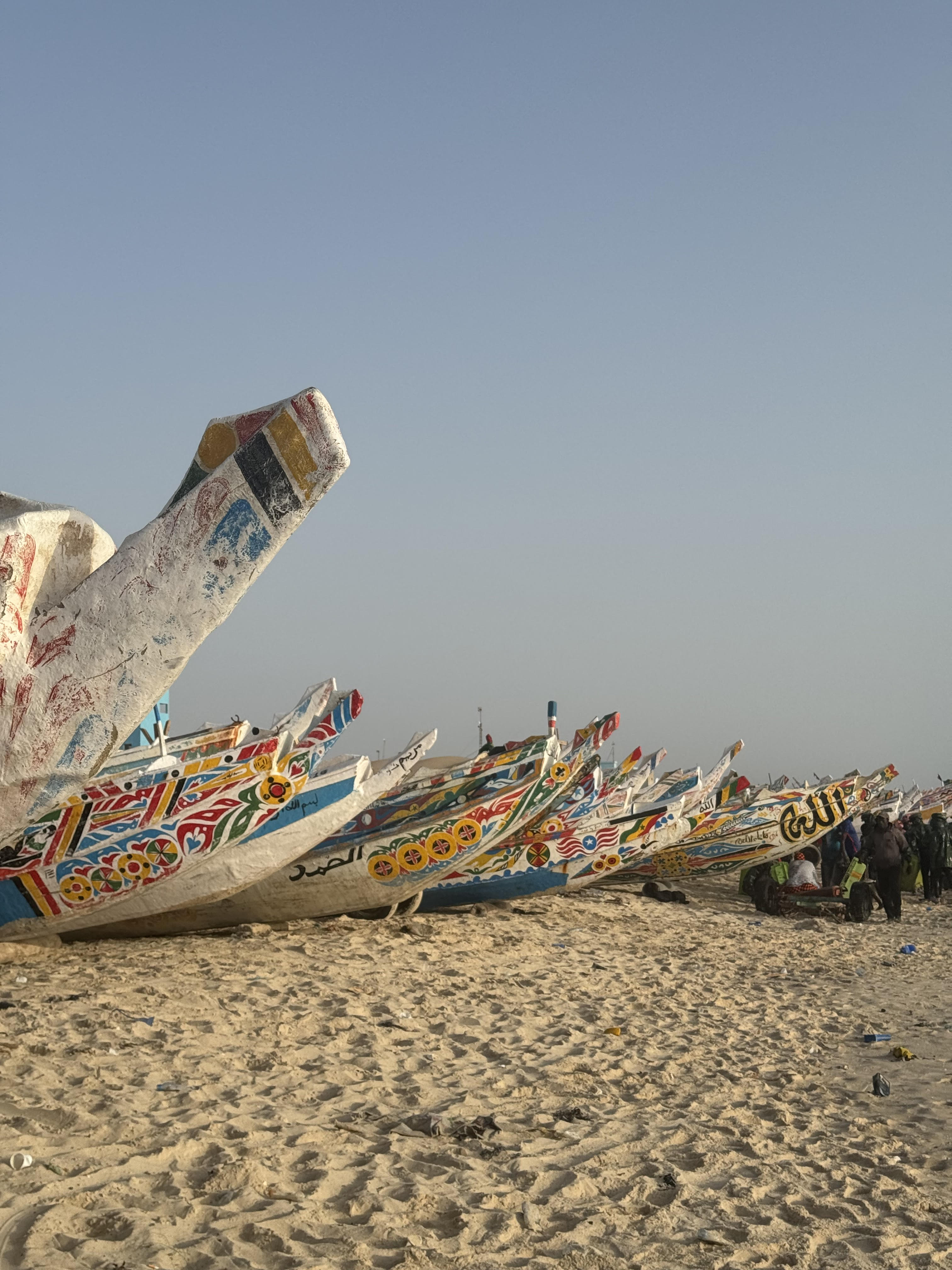
Pirogues at the Nouakchott fish market
