= Chamber of Commerce, Industry and Agriculture of Mauritania =

- Arabic: غرفة التجارة والصناعة والزراعة الموريتانية; French: Chambre de Commerce, d’Industrie et d’Agriculture de Mauritanie
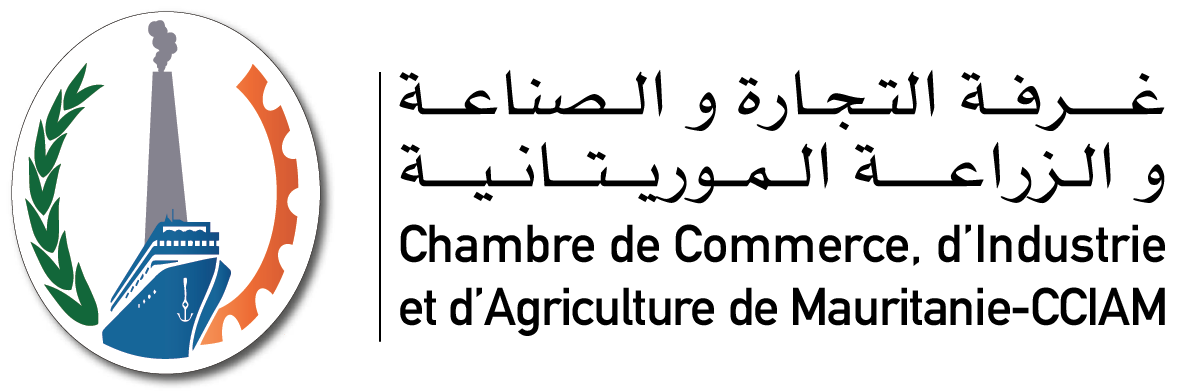

Agency overview
- Formed: 1958; 67 years ago
- Type: Public establishment of a professional nature
- Jurisdiction: Mauritania
- Headquarters: Tevragh Zeina, Nouakchott-Ouest; 18°5′22″N 15°58′22″W
- Minister responsible: Lemrabott Ould Bennahi, Minister of Trade, Industry, Handicrafts, and Tourism
- Key document: Decree nº2000-04

The Chamber of Commerce, Industry and Agriculture of Mauritania (Arabic: غرفة التجارة والصناعة والزراعة الموريتانية, French: Chambre de Commerce, d’Industrie et d’Agriculture de Mauritanie), abbreviated as CCIAM, is the national chamber of commerce of Mauritania.
