= Nouakchott-Sud region =

Region of Mauritania

Nouakchott-Sud نواكشوط الجنوبية
- Region of Mauritania
- Coordinates: 18°3′N 16°0′W
- Country: Mauritania
- Departments: Arafat, El Mina, Riyad
- Created: 25 November 2014
- Capital: Arafat

Government
  - Wāli: Rabbou Ould Bounenna

Area
  - Total: 252 km^{2} (97 sq mi)

Population (2023)
  - Total: 627,415
  - Density: 2,490/km^{2} (6,450/sq mi)
- Time zone: UTC+0
  - Summer (DST): not observed

Nouakchott-Sud (lit. 'South Nouakchott', Arabic: نواكشوط الجنوبية, romanized: Nuwākshūṭ al-Janūbīyah) is a region in Mauritania. It comprises the three southern departments of Mauritania's capital city Nouakchott: Arafat, El Mina and Riyad. Its headquarters (HQ) are at Arafat and Nouakchott's deep-water port is located within its borders.

Nouakchott-Sud was created on 25 November 2014 when the region of Nouakchott was split into three new regions. Its wāli or governor is Rabbou Ould Bounenna.
