= Nouakchott-Nord region =

Region of Mauritania

Nouakchott-Nord نواكشوط الشمالية
- Region of Mauritania
- Coordinates: 18°6′N 15°55′W
- Country: Mauritania
- Departments: Dar-Naim, Teyarett, Toujouonine
- Created: 25 November 2014
- Capital: Dar-Naim

Government
  - Wāli: Mohamed Lemine Ould Mohamed Teyib Ould Adi

Area
  - Total: 306 km^{2} (118 sq mi)

Population (2023 census)
  - Total: 614,465
  - Density: 2,010/km^{2} (5,200/sq mi)
- Time zone: UTC+0
  - Summer (DST): not observed

Nouakchott-Nord (lit. 'North Nouakchott', Arabic: نواكشوط الشمالية, romanized: Nuwākshūṭ al-Shamālīyah) is a region in Mauritania. It comprises the three northwestern departments of Mauritania's capital city Nouakchott: Dar-Naim, Teyarett and Toujouonine. The capital is at Dar-Naim and Nouakchott International Airport (old airport) was located within its borders.

Nouakchott-Nord was created on 25 November 2014 when the region of Nouakchott was split into three new regions. Its wāli or governor is Mohamed Lemine Ould Mohamed Teyib Ould Adi.
