= El Mina, Mauritania =

El Mina
- Commune and city
- Location in Mauritania
- Coordinates: 19°26′N 15°21′W
- Country: Mauritania
- Region: Nouakchott-Sud

Area
  - Total: 59.0 sq mi (152.8 km^{2})

Population (2023 census)
  - Total: 181,640
  - Density: 3,079/sq mi (1,189/km^{2})
- Time zone: UTC+0 (GMT)

El Mina is a suburb of Nouakchott and urban commune in western Mauritania. It has a population of 181,640 (2023 census).

El Mina has a bad reputation in Mauritania. It is considered one of the poorest parts of the city and is known for its prostitution. It is mainly inhabited by the descendants of slaves. The UN Special Rapporteur on contemporary forms of racism, racial discrimination, xenophobia and related intolerance visited El Mina in 2008.

== Red-light district ==
Hundreds of women work in the brothels of El Mina. Many are foreign, including from Senegal and Nigeria. Although prostitution is illegal in Mauritania, there is little enforcement of the law. Sex worker report police corruption and harassment.
