= Arafat, Mauritania =

Arafat
- Commune and city
- Location in Mauritania
- Coordinates: 18°2′47″N 15°58′19″W
- Country: Mauritania
- Region: Nouakchott-Sud

Area
  - Total: 2.274 sq mi (5.890 km^{2})

Population (2013 census)
  - Total: 216,919
  - Density: 95,380/sq mi (36,830/km^{2})
- Time zone: UTC+0 (GMT)

Arafat is a suburb of Nouakchott and urban commune in western Mauritania. It is the capital of Nouakchott-Sud Region and had a population of 216,919 in 2023.
