= Fatimatou Abdel Malick =

Mauritanian politician (born 1958)

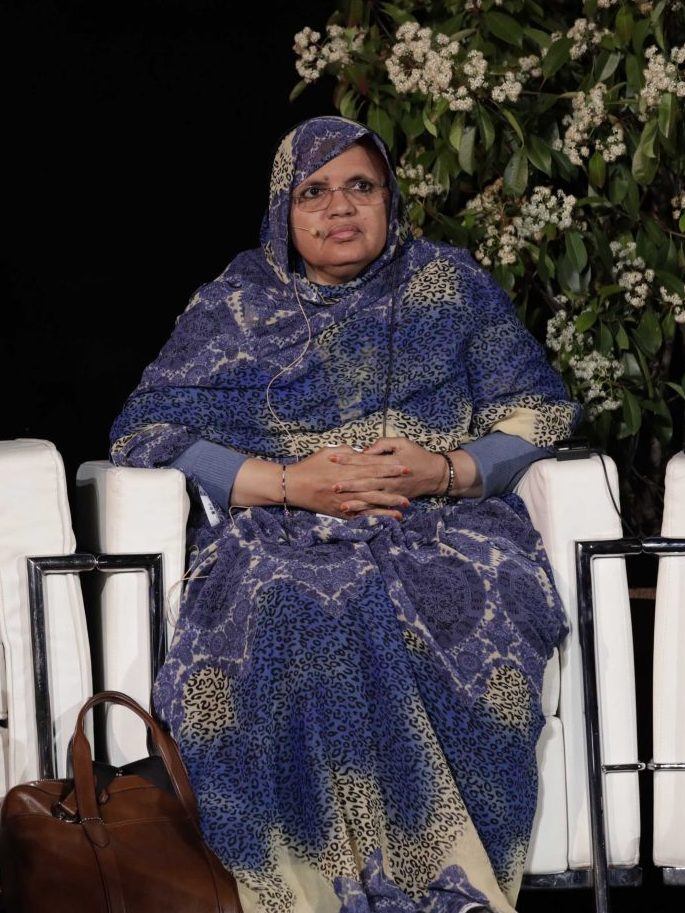
- Fatimetou Abdel Malick in 2017

Mayor of Tevragh-Zeina
- Incumbent
- Assumed office 2001

Personal details
- Born: 1958 (age 67–68) Tamchakett, Mauritania
- Party: Republican Party for Democracy and Renewal

Fatimatou Mint Abdel Malick (born 1958) is a Mauritanian politician who has served as mayor of Tevragh-Zeina since 2001. She was the first woman in her country to hold the position of mayor. From 2012 to 2015 she served as president of The Network for Locally Elected Women of Africa (REFELA).

== Early life and education ==
Abdel Malik was born in 1958 in Tamchakett, where her father was an administrator. She studied computer science in Louvain-la-Neuve, Belgium.

== Career ==
Abdel Malik ran a computer services office, MINFE, in Nouakchott before working as the network administrator for Habitat Bank. She then worked at the Ministry of Urban Planning and Habitat before being appointed to the Prime Minister's Office.

In 2001, Abdel Malick was asked to run for municipal office by the then Democratic and Social Republican Party (PRDS), and she was elected mayor of Tevragh-Zeina, one of the nine communes of the Nouakchott Urban Community. She was the first woman to serve as a mayor in Mauritania. She has improved school education, particularly for girls, and reformed the administration. She was re-elected in 2006, 2011 and 2015.

From 2012 until December 2015, Abdel Malick served as the president of the Network for Locally Elected Women of Africa. The network, formed in Tangier in March 2011, brings together women elected in local government positions. Abdel Malick has travelled throughout Mauritania to support female candidates for office and has seen five more women join her as mayors, including Maty Mint Hamady.

In 2023, United Nations Secretary-General António Guterres appointed Abdel Malick to co-chair his Advisory Group on Local and Regional Governments, alongside Pilar Cancela Rodríguez.

== Awards and honours ==
- United Nations International Strategy for Disaster Reduction "Champion for Resilience" 2013
- Knight of Honour of the Republic of the Congo 2013
- FAO Medal 2015

== Personal life ==
Abdel Malick is a single mother to three children. She is a Muslim.
