= Dar Naïm =

Dar-Naim
- Commune and city
- Location in Mauritania
- Coordinates: 18°2′N 15°58′W
- Country: Mauritania
- Region: Nouakchott-Nord

Area
  - Total: 8.92 sq mi (23.11 km^{2})

Population (2023 census)
  - Total: 186,925
  - Density: 20,950/sq mi (8,088/km^{2})
- Time zone: UTC+0 (GMT)

Dar-Naim is a suburb of Nouakchott and urban commune in western Mauritania. It is the capital of Nouakchott-Nord Region and has a population of 186,925 (2023).

== See also ==
- Dar Naim Prison
- Nouakchott-Nord Region
