= Nouakchott-Ouest region =

Region of Mauritania

Nouakchott-Ouest نواكشوط الغربية
- Region of Mauritania
- Coordinates: 18°6′N 16°0′W
- Country: Mauritania
- Departments: Ksar, Sebkha, Tevragh-Zeina
- Created: 25 November 2014
- Capital: Tevragh-Zeina

Government
  - Wāli: Hammoud Ould Mohamed

Area
  - Total: 146 km^{2} (56 sq mi)

Population (2023)
  - Total: 204,881
  - Density: 1,400/km^{2} (3,630/sq mi)
- Time zone: UTC+0
  - Summer (DST): not observed

Nouakchott-Ouest (lit. 'West Nouakchott', Arabic: نواكشوط الغربية, romanized: Nuwākshūṭ al-Gharbīyah) is a region in Mauritania. It comprises the three northeastern departments of Mauritania's capital city Nouakchott: Ksar, Sebkha and Tevragh-Zeina. Its headquarters (HQ) are at Tevragh-Zeina and the Presidential Palace is located within its borders.

Nouakchott-Ouest was created on 25 November 2014 when the region of Nouakchott was split into three new regions. Its wāli or governor was Mahi Ould Hamed, who was previously governor of the Nouakchott Region.
