= College of Science and Technology (Mauritania) =

College in Nouakchott, Mauritania

Coordinates: 18°5′21″N 15°58′4″W

College of Science and Technology is a college located in Nouakchott, Mauritania. It is located south of Lebanese International University.
