= National Archives of Mauritania =

The Archives Nationales de Mauritanie (National Archives of Mauritania) is the national archives of Mauritania. It was founded in 1955 and hold 3,000 volumes. As of 2007 it was located on Avenue de l'Indépendance.

Directors have included Mohamed Ould Gaouad (circa 1974), Izidh Bih Ould Sidi Mohamed (circa 2007), and Mohamed Moctar Ould Sidi Mohamed (circa 2017).

== See also ==
- National Library of Mauritania
- List of national archives

== Bibliography ==
- Christian Gut (1976), Republique Islamique de Mauritanie: Réorganisation des archives nationales (PDF), Rapport technique (in French), Paris: Unesco
