= Tevragh Zeina =

Tevragh-Zeina
- Commune and city
- Location in Mauritania
- Coordinates: 18°7′40″N 15°56′21″W
- Country: Mauritania
- Region: Nouakchott-Ouest

Government
  - Mayor: Taleb Abderrahmane Ahmed Taleb El Mahjoub (2023)

Area
  - Total: 9.19 sq mi (23.80 km^{2})

Population (2013 census)
  - Total: 46,336
  - Density: 5,042/sq mi (1,947/km^{2})
- Time zone: UTC+0 (GMT)

Tevragh-Zeina is a suburb of Nouakchott and urban commune in western Mauritania. It is the capital of the Nouakchott-Ouest Region and has a population of 46,336.

The current mayor is Taleb Abderrahmane Ahmed Taleb El Mahjoub.

The El Irvan Library is located in Tevragh-Zeina. Petroleum plays a role in the economy.

It is home to the ASC Tevragh-Zeïna football club and the College Tevragh Zeina.
