= Nouakchott =

Capital and the largest city of Mauritania

Nouakchott: نواكشوط (Arabic); Nuwaasoot (Pulaar); Nuwaaksoot (Wolof); Nuwasooto (Soninke)
- Capital city
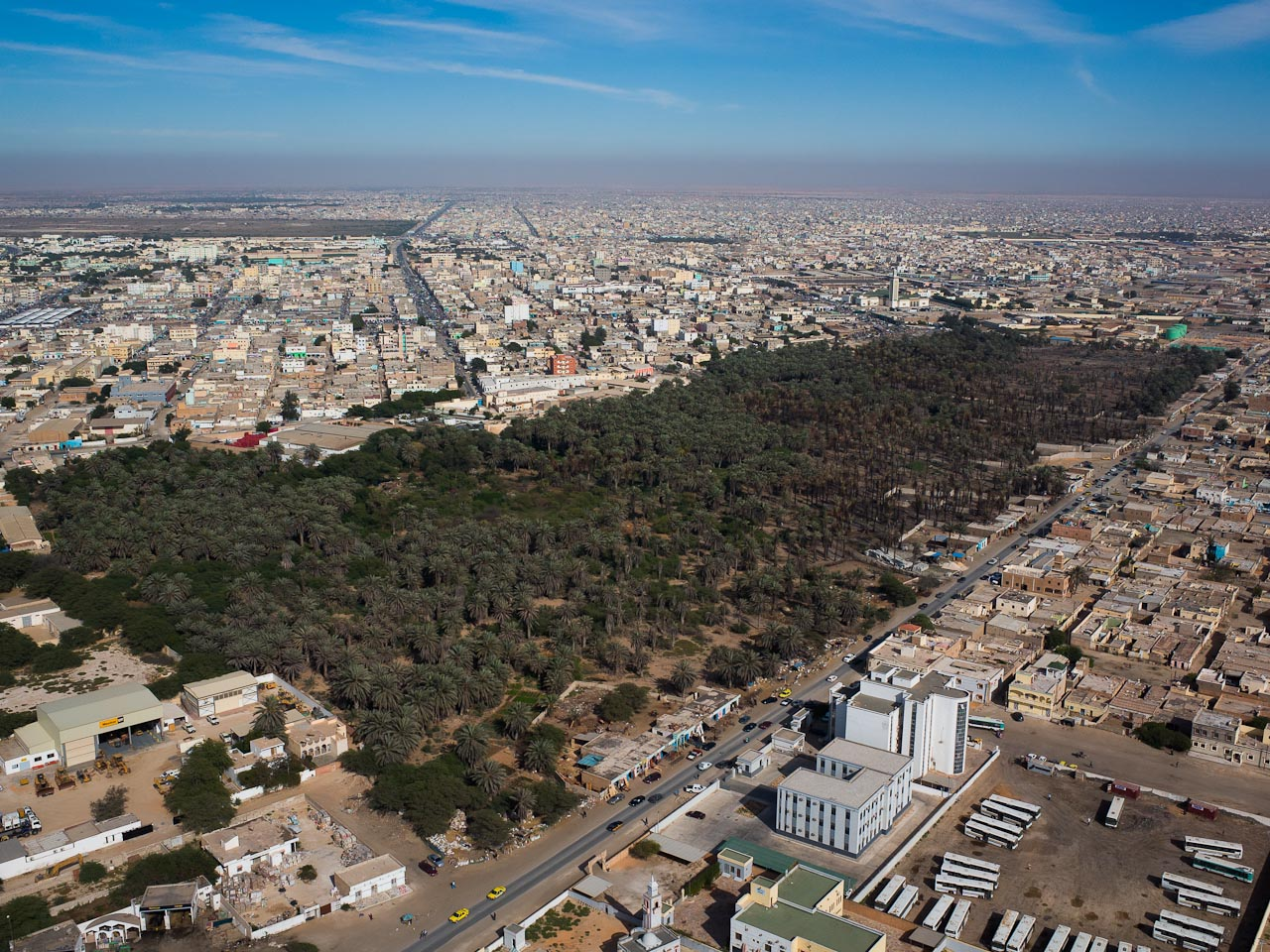
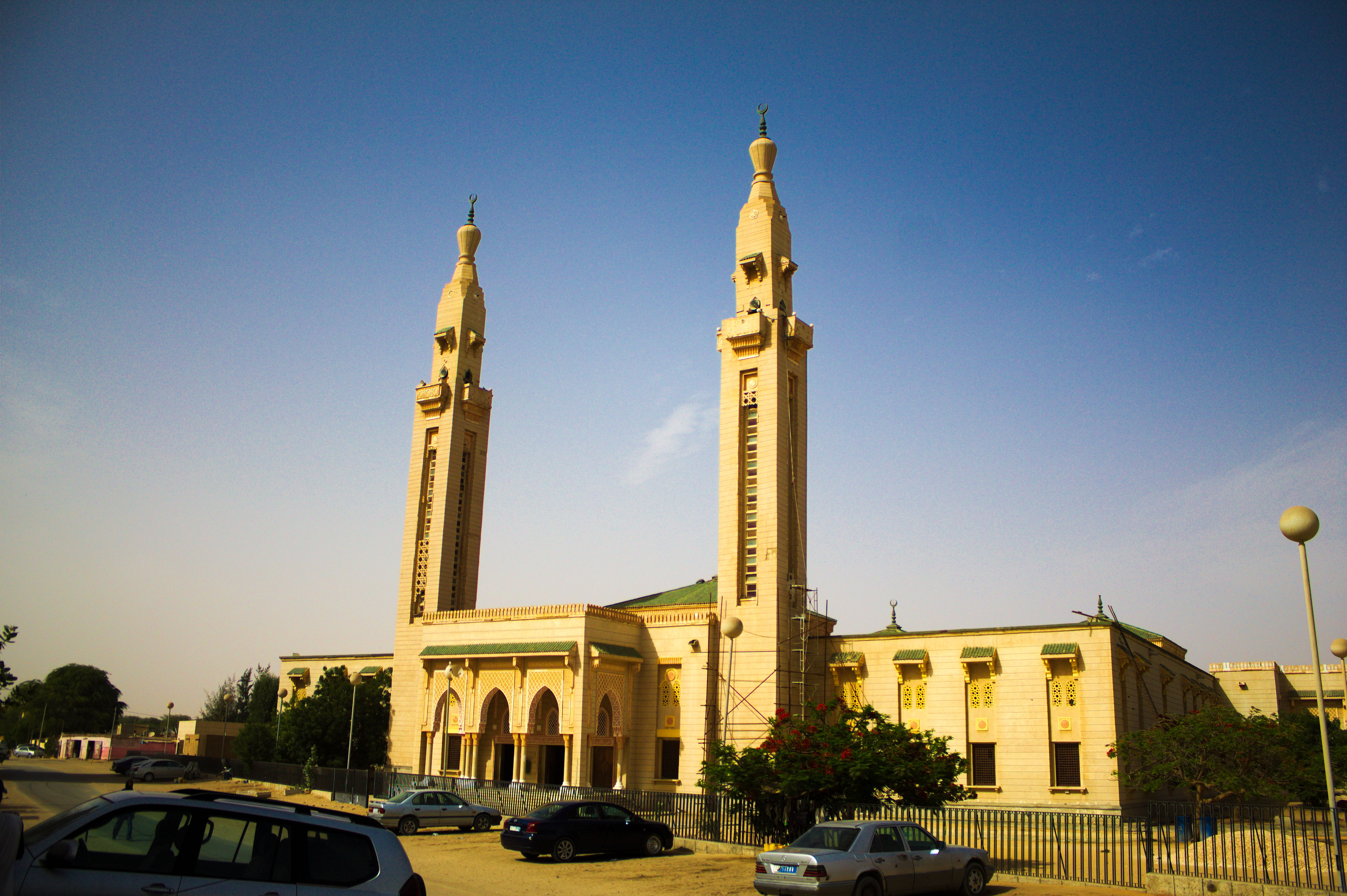
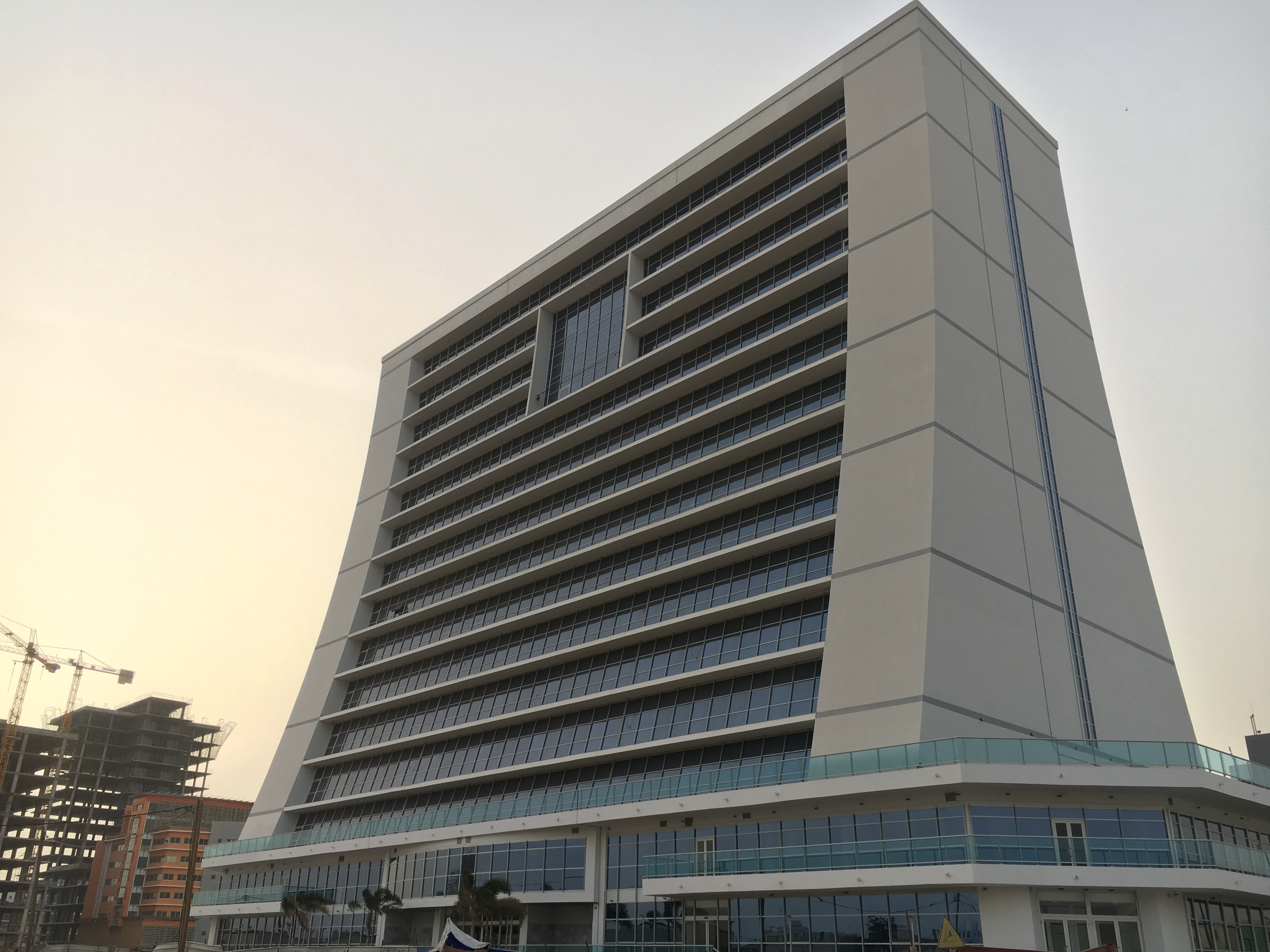
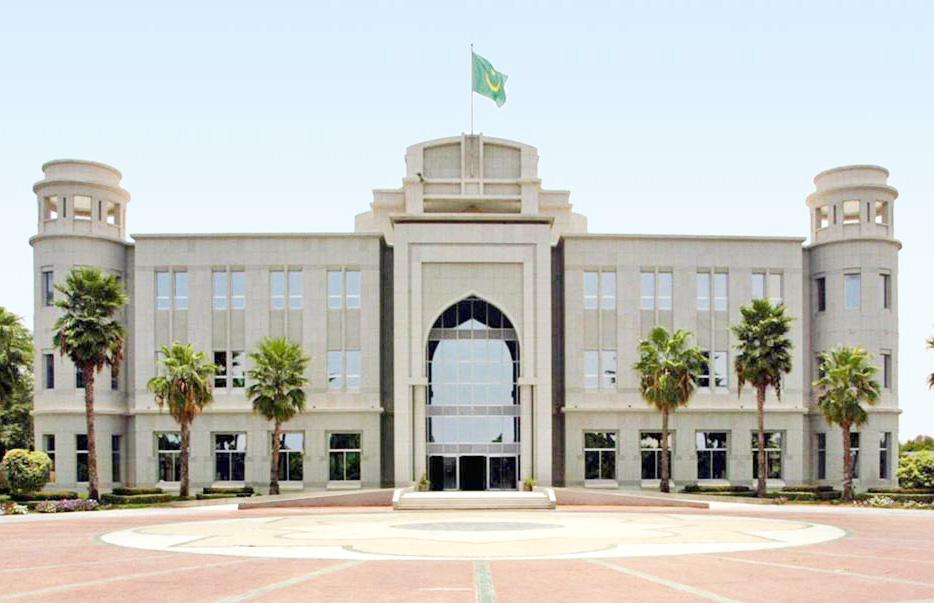
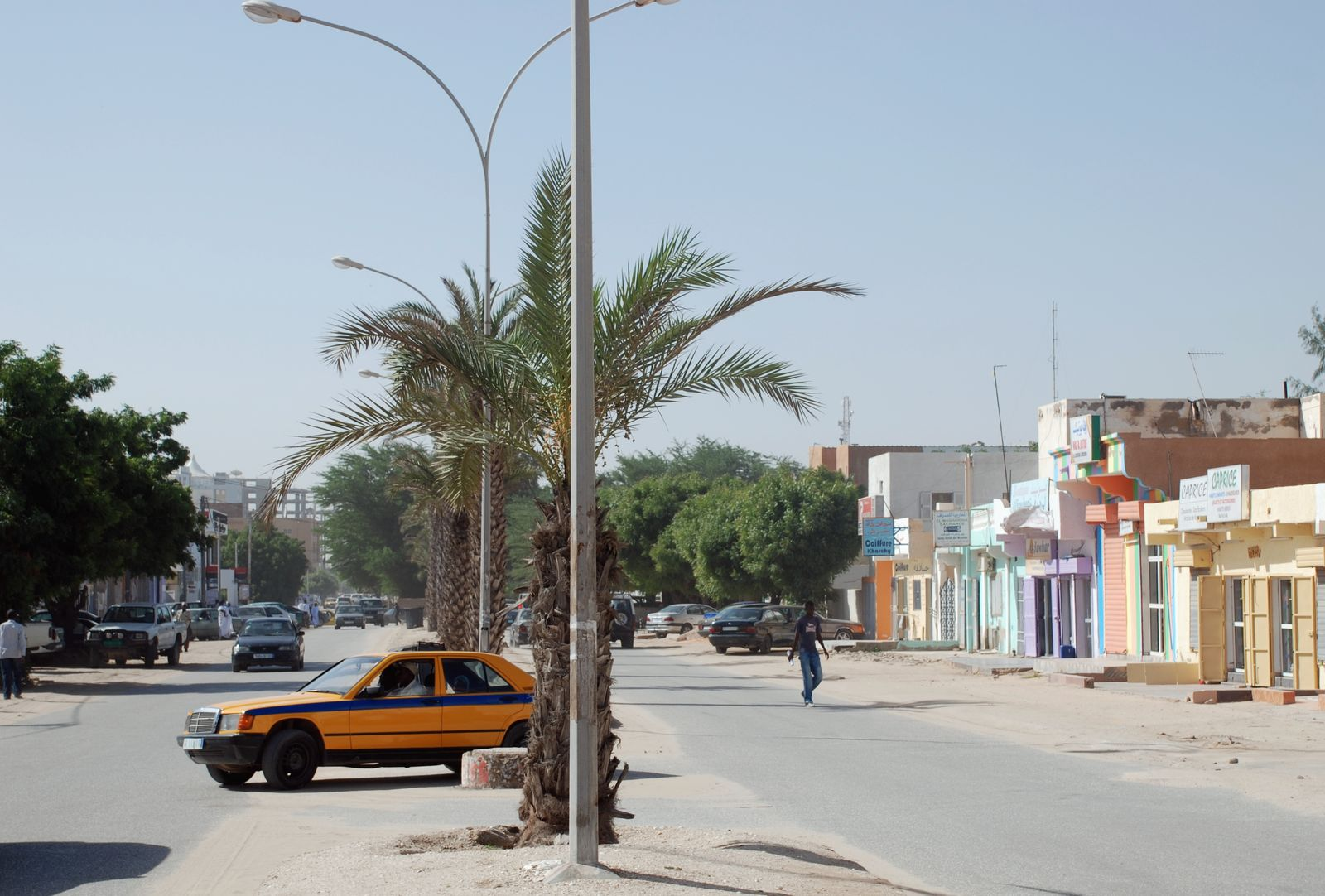
- From the top to bottom-right, View of the City, Saudi Mosque, Société Nationale Industrielle et Minière Tower, Presidential Palace, Avenue Général de Gaulle City view of Nouakchott

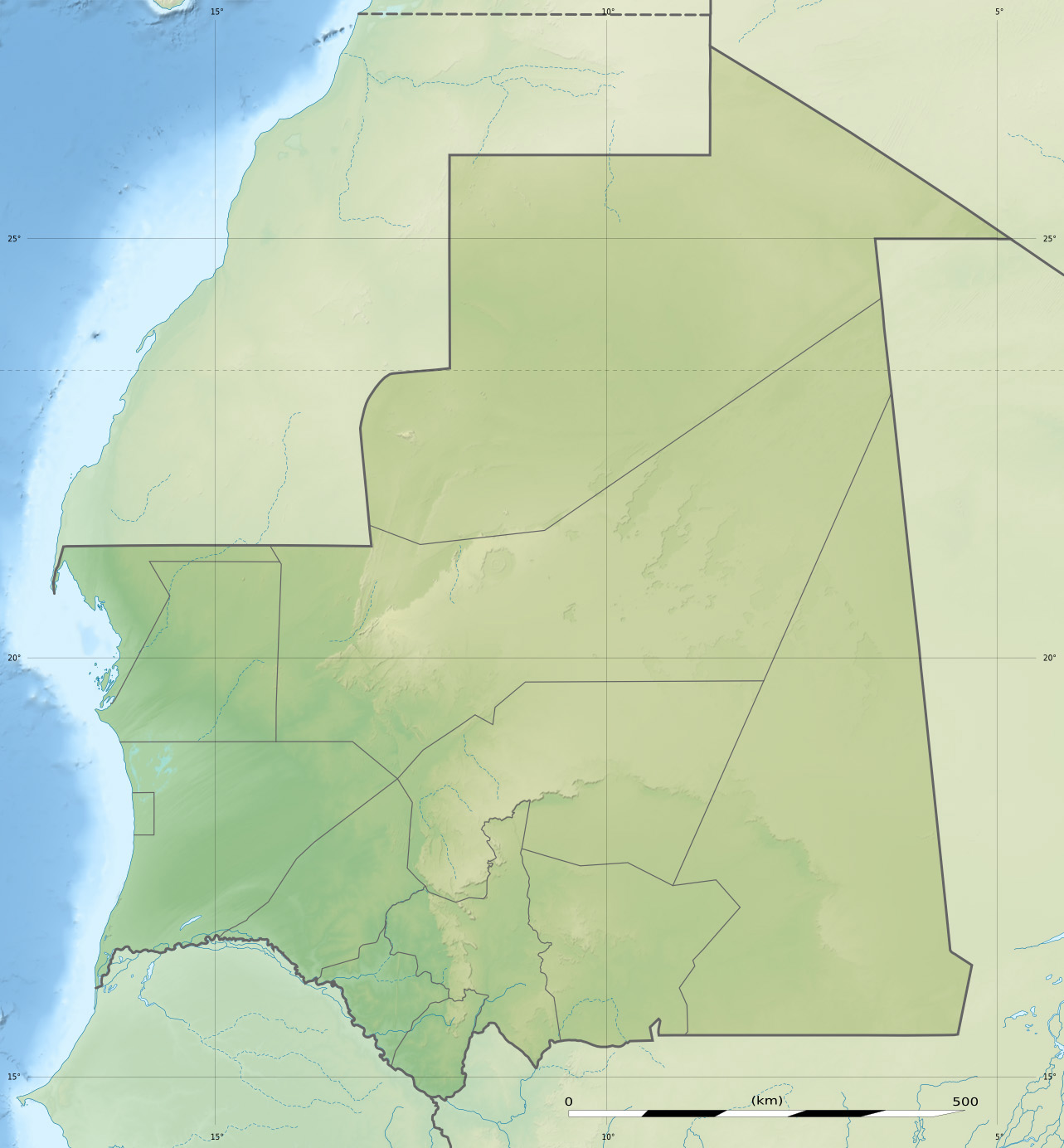
- Location within Mauritania Location within Africa
- Coordinates: 18°05′07″N 15°58′21″W
- Country: Mauritania
- Wilaya: Nouakchott-Nord; Nouakchott-Ouest; Nouakchott-Sud
- Subdivision: Nine communes: Arafat; Dar Naïm; El Mina; Ksar; Riyad; Sebkha; Tevragh Zeina; Teyarett; Toujounine

Government
  - Body: Regional Council of Nouakchott
  - Council president: Fatimatou Abdel Malick (El Insaf)

Area
  - Total: 1,000 km^{2} (390 sq mi)
- Elevation: 7 m (23 ft)

Population (2023 census)
  - Total: 1,446,761
  - Rank: 1st in Mauritania
  - Density: 1,400/km^{2} (3,700/sq mi)
- Time zone: UTC+00:00 (GMT)
- Website: crn.mr/index.php

Nouakchott (/nwækˈʃɒt, nwɑː-/ nwa(h)k-SHOT) (Note: French: [nwakʃɔt]; Arabic: نواكشوط, romanized: Nwākshūṭ, Hassaniyya: [nwakʃuːtˤ]; Wolof: Nuwaaksoot; Pulaar: Nuwaasoot; Soninke: Nuwasooto; Berber: Nwakcoṭ, originally derived from Berber: Nawākšūṭ, 'place of the winds' or alternatively Zenaga: in wakchodh, 'having no ears') is the capital and largest city of Mauritania. Located in the southwestern part of the country, it is one of the largest cities in the Sahara. The city also serves as the administrative and economic center of Mauritania.

Once a mid-sized coastal village, Nouakchott was selected as the capital for the nascent nation of Mauritania, with construction beginning in 1958. It was originally designed to accommodate a population of 15,000, but experienced significant population growth in the 1970s when many Mauritanians fled their home villages due to drought and increasing desertification. Many of the newcomers settled in slum areas of the city that were poorly maintained and extremely overcrowded. By the mid-1980s, Nouakchott's population was estimated to be between 400,000 and 500,000.

As of 2023, the city had a population of nearly 1.5 million people and serves as the hub of the Mauritanian economy. It is home to a deepwater port and Nouakchott–Oumtounsy International Airport, one of the country's two international airports. It also hosts the University of Nouakchott and several other more specialized institutions of higher learning.

== History ==
Before 1958, Nouakchott was a small fishing town, having been a fortified fishing village (ksar) in pre-colonial times and under French rule. As Mauritania prepared for independence, it lacked a capital city. The area of present-day Nouakchott was chosen by Moktar Ould Daddah, the first President of Mauritania, and his advisors. Ould Daddah desired the new capital to symbolize modernity and national unity, which ruled out existing cities or towns in the interior. The village was selected as the capital city for its central location between Saint-Louis, Senegal, the city from which the colony of Mauritania was governed, and Nouadhibou. The village of Nouakchott was originally inhabited by the tribe of Bouhoubainy who are of Amazigh origin and are native to it. They have since been moved to different settlements notably Aknodert which is situated between Nouakchott and the International Airport. One of the intentions of choosing this location was to avoid the sensitive issue of whether the capital was built in an area dominated by the Arabs and Amazigh (Berbers) or Sub-Saharan Africans.

Construction began in March 1958 to enlarge the village to house a population of 15,000, in 1959 Nouakchott started with its founding by indigenous people from the surrounding region, and the basics were completed by the time that the French granted independence on 28 November 1960. Nouakchott was planned with the expectation that commerce and other economic activities would not take place in the city. Nouakchott's central business district was planned with broad streets and a grid-like structure; the new Cinquième Quartier (Fifth District) was located close to this area and became the location of a large open-air market and residential area within a few years. During the 1960s, the city obtained its own local government. By the 1970s, these new areas had grown so much that they replaced the old ksar in terms of importance, as they also hosted the governmental buildings and state enterprises.

The city was attacked twice in 1976 by the Polisario Front during the Western Sahara conflict, but the guerrillas caused little damage. The city has had massive and unconstrained growth, driven by the North African drought, since the beginning of the 1970s; hundreds of thousands moved there in search of a better life. The official censuses showed 134,000 residents in 1977 and 393,325 in 1988, although both figures were probably smaller than reality. The population is now estimated to consist of at least one third of the country's population of 3.3 million, and the 2013 census showed a population of 958,399.

== Geography ==
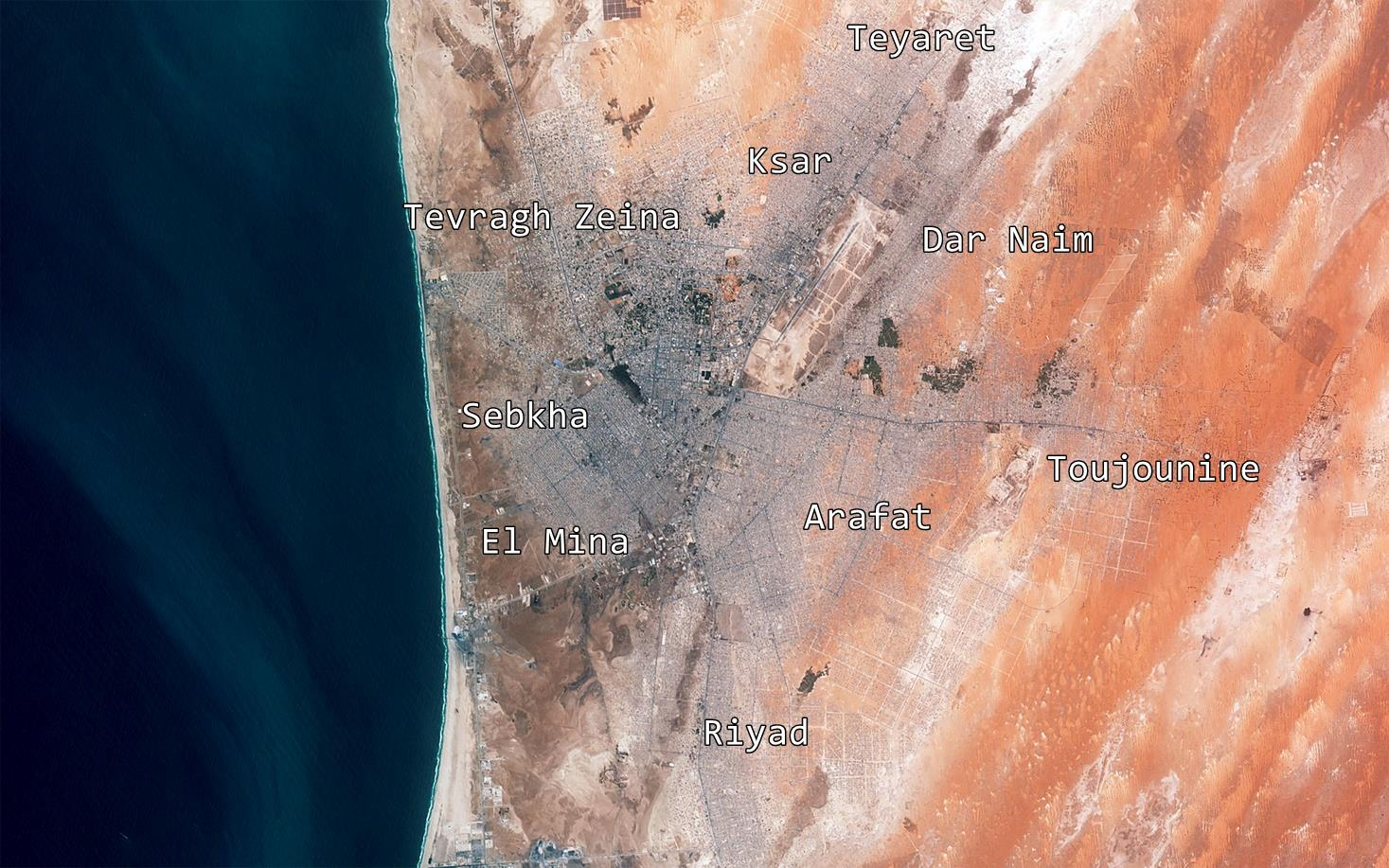
Satellite image of Nouakchott with district names

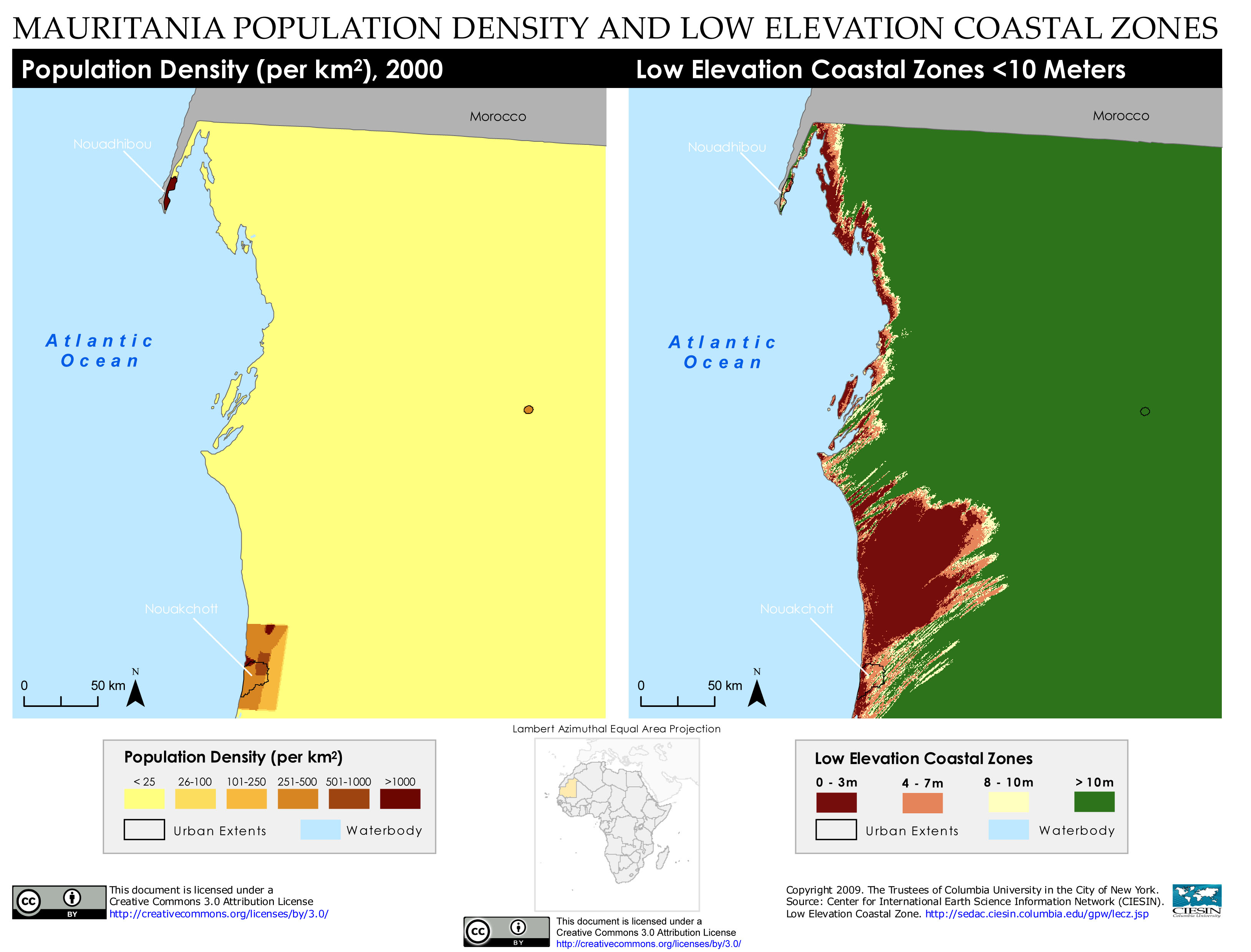
Population density and low elevation coastal zones. Nouakchott is especially vulnerable to sea level rise.

Located on the Atlantic coast of the Sahara Desert, it lies on the west coast of Africa. With the exception of Friendship Port and a small fishing port, the coastal strip is mostly left empty and allowed to flood. The coastline includes shifting sandbanks and sandy beaches. There are areas of quicksand close to the harbor. Nouakchott is largely flat, and some of the city lies below sea level. It is threatened by the sand dunes advancing from its eastern side which pose a daily problem. There have been efforts to save particular areas, including work by Jean Meunier. Owing to the rapid build-up, the city is quite spread out, with few tall buildings. Most buildings are one-story.

Nouakchott is built around a large tree-lined street, Avenue Gamal Abdel Nasser, which runs northeast through the city centre from the airport. It divides the city into two, with the residential areas in the north and the medina quarter, along with the kebbe, a shanty town formed due to the displacement of people from other areas by the desert. Other major streets are named (in French) for notable Mauritanian or international figures of the 1960s: Avenue Gamal Abdel Nasser, Avenue Charles de Gaulle, Avenue Kennedy, and Avenue Lumumba, for example.

The kebbe consists of cement buildings that are built overnight and made to look permanent to avoid destruction by the authorities. In 1999, it was estimated that more than half of the city's inhabitants lived in tents and shacks, which were used for residential as well as business purposes. The city is broken into nine arrondissements, sub-divided into alphabetized Îlots. These are Teyarett, Ksar, Tevragh-Zeïna, Toujounine, Sebkha, El Mina, Dar-Naïm, Arafat and Riad. The Sebkha (Cinquième) Arrondissement is home to a large shopping area.

=== Climate ===
Nouakchott features a hot desert climate (Köppen: BWh) with high temperatures throughout the year but cool winter nights. Due to the city's ocean-side location, Nouakchott is generally not quite as hot as other cities with the same climate. Still, the city can experience sweltering days. While average high temperatures are relatively constant at around 33 °C (91 °F), average low temperatures can range from 25 °C (77 °F) during the autumn months (autumn is hotter than summer, with September and October being the hottest months) to 13 °C (55 °F) during the winter months. Minimum temperatures can fall below 10 °C (50 °F) during winter nights in Nouakchott. Average rainfall in the city is 113 mm (4.4 in) a year.

Climate data for Nouakchott (Oumtounsy Airport) (1991–2020, extremes 1934–present)
Month	Jan	Feb	Mar	Apr	May	Jun	Jul	Aug	Sep	Oct	Nov	Dec	Year
Record high °C (°F)	39.9 (103.8)	41.7 (107.1)	44.0 (111.2)	47.5 (117.5)	47.0 (116.6)	47.2 (117.0)	47.5 (117.5)	45.1 (113.2)	45.5 (113.9)	45.6 (114.1)	42.3 (108.1)	39.6 (103.3)	47.5 (117.5)
Mean daily maximum °C (°F)	29.1 (84.4)	30.6 (87.1)	32.1 (89.8)	33.5 (92.3)	33.7 (92.7)	34.1 (93.4)	31.4 (88.5)	32.3 (90.1)	34.6 (94.3)	35.8 (96.4)	33.2 (91.8)	30.0 (86.0)	32.5 (90.5)
Daily mean °C (°F)	21.8 (71.2)	23.0 (73.4)	24.5 (76.1)	25.5 (77.9)	26.7 (80.1)	27.9 (82.2)	27.3 (81.1)	28.3 (82.9)	29.6 (85.3)	29.1 (84.4)	26.2 (79.2)	22.9 (73.2)	26.1 (79.0)
Mean daily minimum °C (°F)	14.5 (58.1)	15.3 (59.5)	16.9 (62.4)	18.2 (64.8)	19.8 (67.6)	21.7 (71.1)	23.2 (73.8)	24.3 (75.7)	24.5 (76.1)	22.4 (72.3)	19.1 (66.4)	15.8 (60.4)	19.6 (67.3)
Record low °C (°F)	3.9 (39.0)	7.0 (44.6)	5.0 (41.0)	10.0 (50.0)	13.0 (55.4)	15.7 (60.3)	15.0 (59.0)	16.1 (61.0)	17.0 (62.6)	13.0 (55.4)	9.3 (48.7)	5.0 (41.0)	3.9 (39.0)
Average precipitation mm (inches)	1 (0.0)	1 (0.0)	0 (0)	0 (0)	0 (0)	1 (0.0)	11 (0.4)	51 (2.0)	36 (1.4)	8 (0.3)	3 (0.1)	1 (0.0)	113 (4.4)
Average precipitation days (≥ 1.0 mm)	0.1	0.1	0.0	0.0	0.0	0.2	1.2	4.2	3.1	0.8	0.3	0.1	10.1
Average relative humidity (%)	34	36	38	42	48	54	59	62	58	45	38	33	45
Mean monthly sunshine hours	232.5	220.4	260.4	270.0	282.1	240.0	238.7	254.2	228.0	260.4	243.0	217.0	2,946.7
Mean daily sunshine hours	7.5	7.8	8.4	9.0	9.1	8.0	7.7	8.2	7.6	8.4	8.1	7.0	8.1
Source: Deutscher Wetterdienst

==== Climate change ====
A 2019 paper published in PLOS One estimated that, under Representative Concentration Pathway 4.5, a "moderate" scenario of climate change in which global warming reaches ~2.5–3 °C (4.5–5.4 °F) by 2100, the climate of Nouakchott in the year 2050 would most closely resemble the current climate of Khartoum. The annual temperature would increase by 2.3 °C (4.1 °F), and the temperature of the warmest month by 2.8 °C (5.0 °F), while the temperature of the coldest month would decrease by 0.3 °C (0.54 °F). According to Climate Action Tracker, the current warming trajectory appears consistent with 2.7 °C (4.9 °F), which closely matches RCP 4.5. | source = Office National de la Météorologie (ONM)

==== Sustainability ====
Responding to a 450% projected increase in electricity demand between 2010 and 2030, Nouakchott's Sheikh Zayed solar power plant was completed in 2012 and is considered the largest solar power plant in Africa. The desert climate causes dust accumulation, which negatively affects the performance of photovoltaic solar panels.

== Government ==
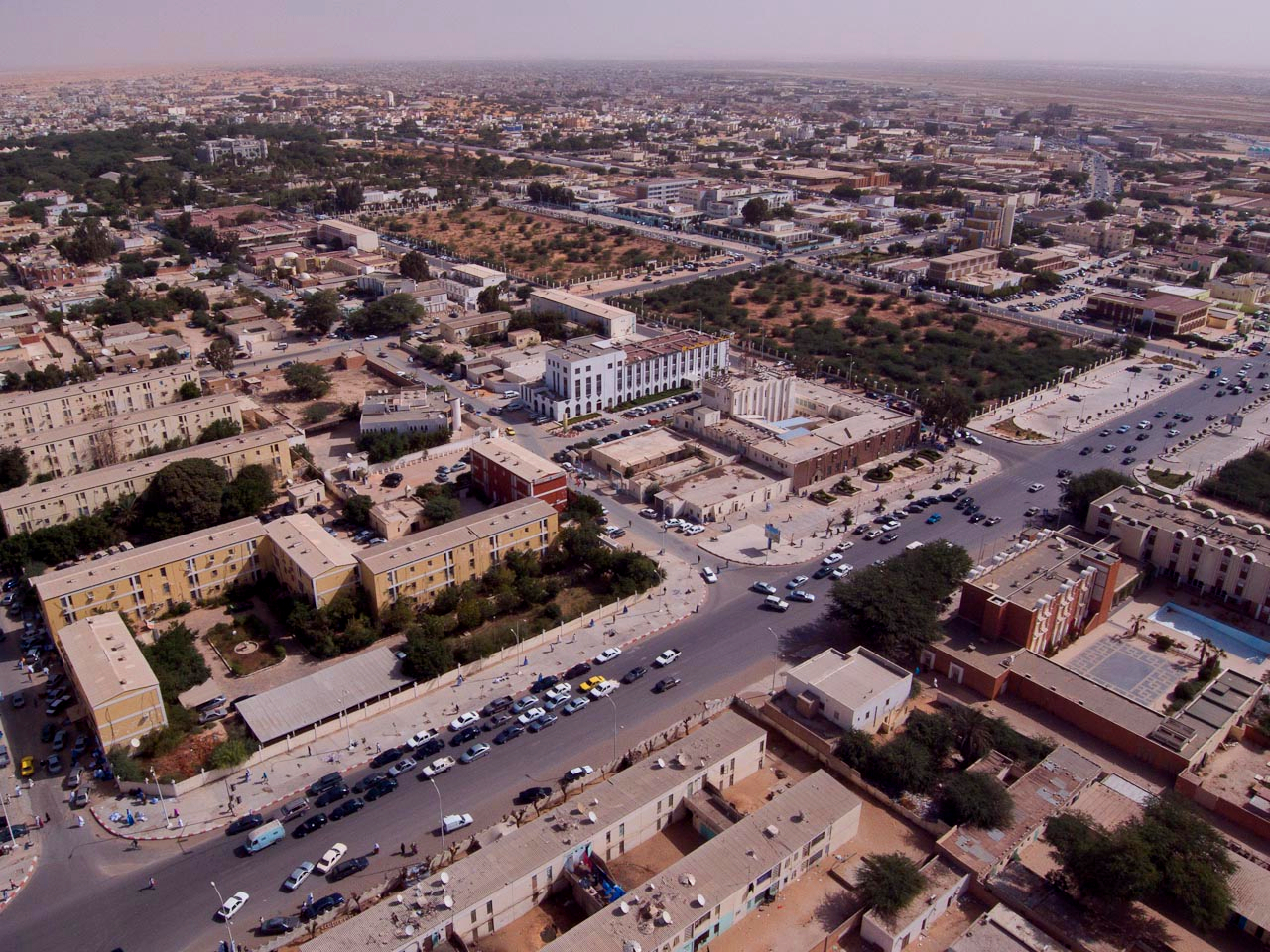
A partial view of the city

Nouakchott is divided into three administrative regions (wilayat) led by governors appointed by the central government, each of which contains three departments (moughataa):

- Nouakchott-Nord (Nouakchott-North): Dar-Naim, Teyarett, Toujouonine
- Nouakchott-Ouest (Nouakchott-West): Ksar, Sebkha, Tevragh-Zeina
- Nouakchott-Sud (Nouakchott-South): Arafat, El Mina, Riyad

Separate from the wilayat, a directly elected regional council was established in Nouakchott in 2018, which took over the roles of promoting social and economic development from the Urban Community that it replaced. Fatimatou Abdel Malick was elected Council president in September 2018, and re-elected in May 2023.

Nouakchott was initially divided into four departments in 1973. In 1986 the current nine departments were created.

Formerly a district, in 1990 Nouakchott became a region of Mauritania. On 25 November 2014, it was split into the three current regions, with the previous governor of Nouakchott Mahi Ould Hamed becoming the first governor of Nouakchott-Nord.

== Demographics ==
Historical population
Year	Pop.	±%
1961	5,807	—
1965	15,000	+158.3%
1970	25,000	+66.7%
1977	134,704	+438.8%
1981	232,000	+72.2%
1988	393,325	+69.5%
2000	558,195	+41.9%
2013	958,399	+71.7%
2023	1,446,761	+51.0%

The population of Nouakchott was only 20,000 in 1969. Part of the difficulty in estimating the city's population is that part of it is nomadic, setting up tents in suitable locations, then packing up when the need strikes. Some estimates put the 2008 population at over 2 million. The 2013 census gave the city's population as 958,399.

=== Slum resettlement ===
In 2009, the government of Mauritania announced that it would begin a process of clearing the slum on the outskirts of Nouakchott, as 24,000 families would eventually be relocated to planned housing in the city. The process was scheduled to begin with the relocation of 9,000 families from the outskirts into the poor Arafat department neighborhood of "Kosovo", popularly named for its high crime rate and poor services. The government planned to begin moving families in June 2009, despite concerns from aid agencies that needed infrastructure could not be put in place in the receiving neighborhood.

In 2013, it was reported that "slums have been replaced by social dwellings for the poorest." The World Bank reported that the plan met with substantial success; it resulted in access to improved services for 181,035 people in the slum areas. Now in 2023 the population is approximately 1.5M people.

== Economy ==
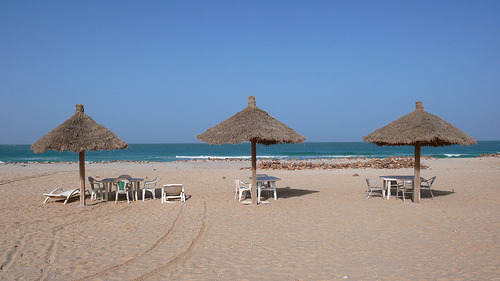
A beach in Nouakchott

Nouakchott is the center of the Mauritanian economy, with three-quarters of service sector enterprises located in the city as of 1999 with 90% of the city's economic activity consisting of informal transactions. The Capital downtown area is home to the headquarters of multiple major national banks and companies and the site of a cluster of open-air markets.

The city is the focus of many modernization and foreign investment projects, with two five-star hotels finishing construction in 2024.

== Transport ==
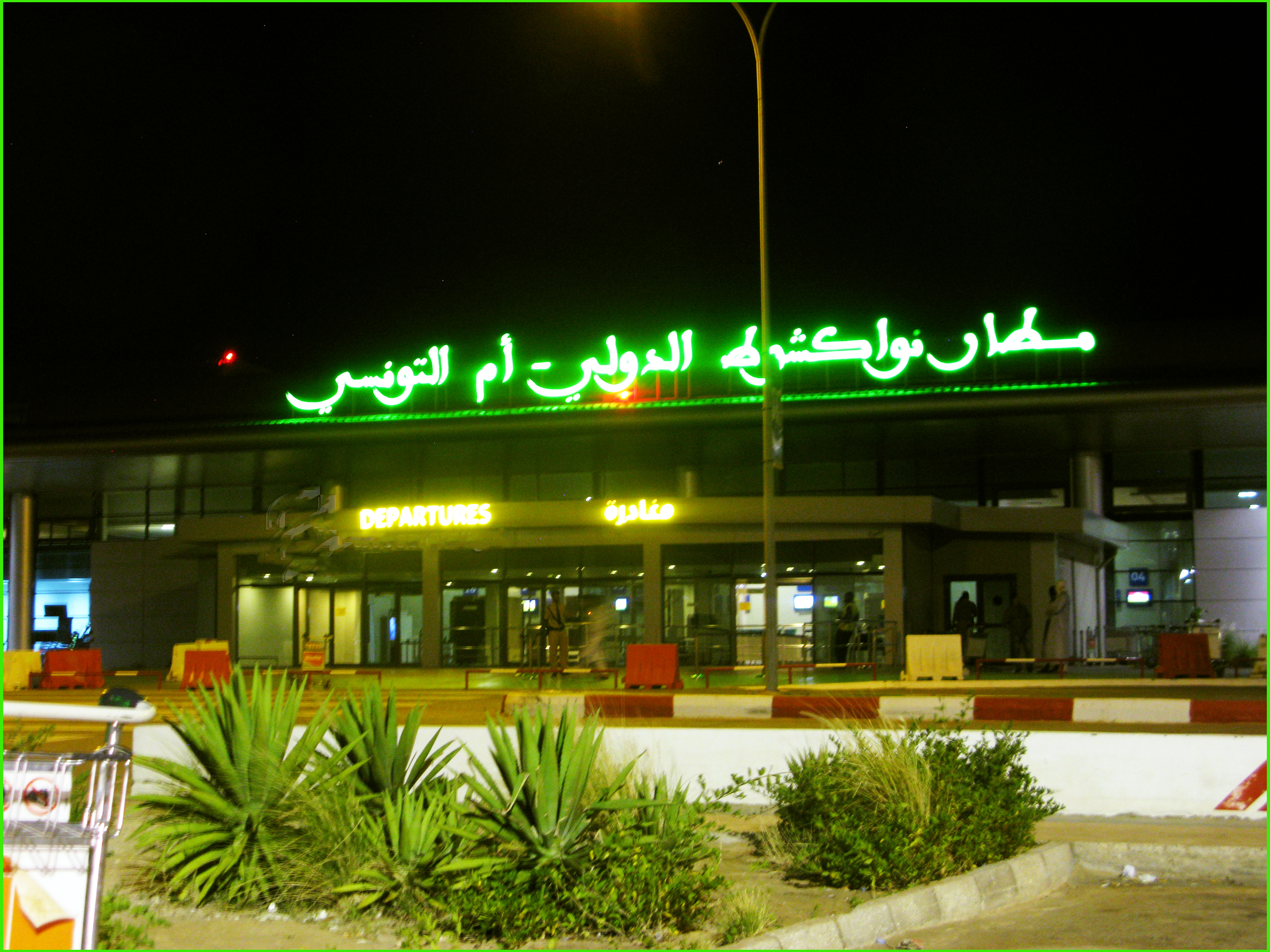
Nouakchott–Oumtounsy International Airport

Nouakchott has a Chinese-built deepwater port that opened in 1986. It was designed for a capacity of 500,000 tons deadweight (DWT) of cargo a year, but has been handling 1,500,000 tons (DWT) by 2009. China agreed in 2009 to invest US$282 million in the port, aiming to extend the main quay by over 900 m (3,000 ft). As of 2011, the World Bank was investigating funding a new shipping container facility at the port.

Air service is provided by Nouakchott–Oumtounsy International Airport, which replaced the previous Nouakchott International Airport in June 2016.

The Cairo–Dakar Highway leg from Nouakchott to Nouadhibou was paved in 2004, although the Nouakchott-Rosso leg was paved before independence. A 1,100-kilometre (680 mi) road (Route de l'Espoir (Road of Hope)) connects the city with Néma via Boutilimit and Kiffa. In the city, there is a public transport and commuter system, with vehicles serving major boulevards.

In July 2022, a tramway project was presented; it does not have a scheduled opening date.

== Education ==
The city is home to the University of Nouakchott Al Aasriya, the main university in Mauritania, which opened in 1981. As of 1995, it had 70 professors and 2,800 students. Other higher education facilities include the Lebanese International University of Mauritania, the National School of Administration, the College of Science and Technology and the Higher Scientific Institute.

Public schools in Nouakchott are dispersed throughout the city, while private schools are concentrated in middle and upper-class districts. Among the most prominent international schools for citizens and expats alike are the American International School of Nouakchott, the Lycée Français Théodore Monod, and TLC International School.

== Culture ==
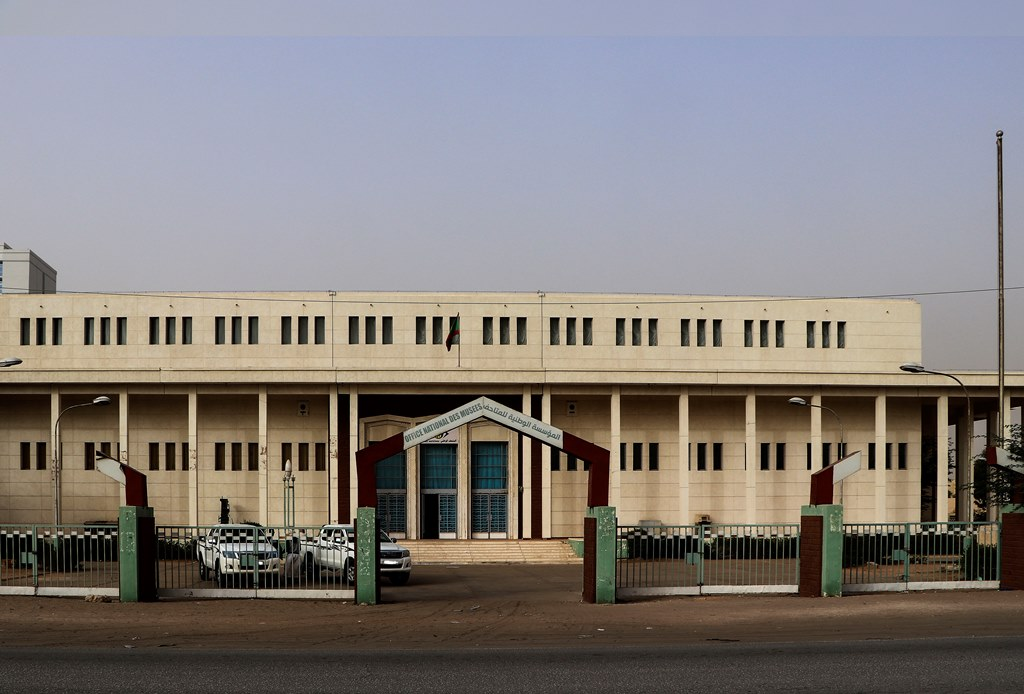
National Museum of Mauritania

Attractions in Nouakchott include the National Museum of Mauritania, the National Library, the Port de Pêche, and the National Archives. The city hosts several markets, including the Marocaine market and the beaches. One beach is devoted to fishing boats where fish can be bought fresh at the Fish market. Nouakchott is a principal selling place of native Saharan meteorites.

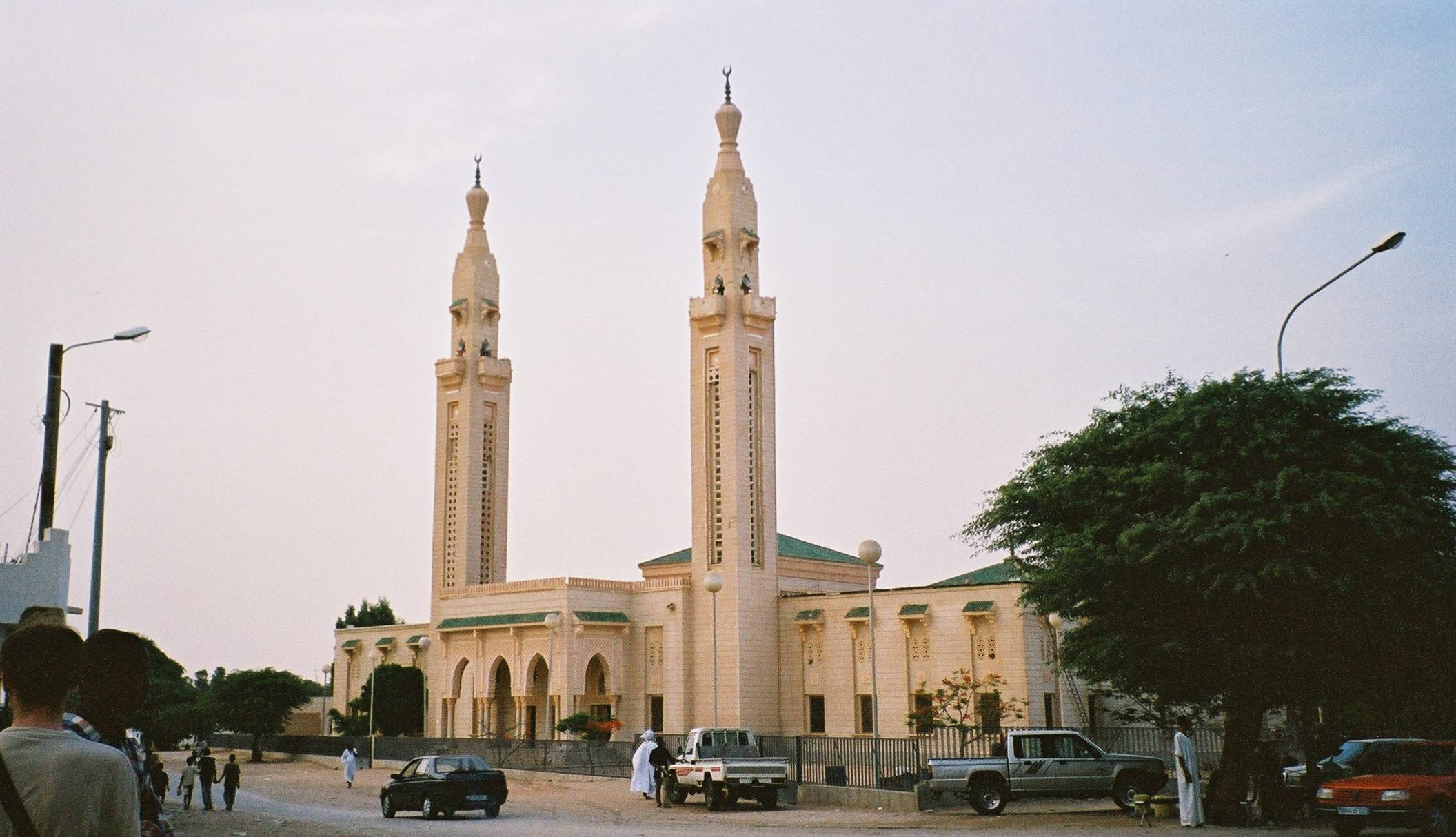
The Saudi Mosque, one of Nouakchott's twelve mosques

== Places of worship ==
Nouakchott, like the rest of the country, is populated by a Sunni Muslim super-majority, and mosques are extremely common in neighborhoods. The Saudi Mosque and Masjid Ibn Abbas are the most notable, due to their grand architecture and size.

There are also few Christian churches and temples: the most well-known is the Cathedral of Saint Joseph in the Roman Catholic Diocese of Nouakchott (Catholic Church).

== Sport ==
Nouakchott hosts ten of the fourteen teams of the Mauritanian Super D1 as of the 2023–2024 season, including ACS Ksar, AS Douanes, AS Garde Nationale, ASAC Concorde, ASC Police, ASC Tidjikja, FC Gourel Sangue, FC Tevragh-Zeina, Kaedi FC, and Nouakchott Kings.

== Twin towns – Sister cities ==
Nouakchott is twinned with:

- Amman, Jordan (1999)
- East Jerusalem, Palestine (2012)
- Lanzhou, China (2000)
- Madrid, Spain (1986)
- Oujda, Morocco

== See also ==
- List of cities in Mauritania
- Economy of Mauritania
- Transport in Mauritania
