= List of political parties in Mauritania =

This article lists political parties in Mauritania.

After the Independence of the country in 1960, President Moktar Ould Daddah merged his Mauritanian Regroupment Party with other opposition parties to form the Mauritanian People's Party (PPM), which ruled the country as the sole legal party from 1961 to 1978. Following the July 1978 coup led by Mustafa Ould Salek, the party was abolished and banned, and Mauritania's civilian leadership was replaced with military rule until President Maaouya Ould Sid'Ahmed Taya established the Democratic and Social Republican Party (PRDS) in 1992. Opposition political parties were allowed, but had no real chance of gaining power.

After the 2005 coup d'état, a transitional military junta was established, which liberalized the political arena, leading to an open and plural political system for the first time in the country's history. The junta organized a constitutional referendum that established term limits to then organize the 2006 parliamentary election and 2007 presidential election, in which members of the junta weren't allowed to run, to then hand power to the newly elected civilian government of Sidi Ould Cheikh Abdallahi.

This government was couped in 2008 by General Mohamed Ould Abdel Aziz. The National Assembly continued to meet even if its powers were restricted, and Aziz won the 2009 presidential election after forming the Union for the Republic (UPR), which became the ruling party and won an absolute majority of seats in the 2013 parliamentary election, even if the "radical opposition", united in the National Front for the Defense of Democracy (FNDD) was boycotting the election. Aziz won re-election in 2014, which were also boycotted by the "radical opposition". The opposition decided to run in the 2018 parliamentary election (with Mauritania then having 105 parties, most of them were disbanded by 2019) and in the 2019 presidential election since Aziz wasn't constitutionally allowed to seek a third term. The UPR, Aziz and their allies in the soon-to-be-formed Coordination of Parties of the Majority endorsed Mohamed Ould Ghazouani, a general that also participated in the 2005 and 2008 coups and was a close figure to Aziz, in the 2019 presidential election, which Ghazouani won with 52% of the vote. He then distanced himself with Aziz, who left the UPR, and oversaw the party's rebranding into the Equity Party.

== Parties ==
=== Parties represented in Parliament ===
The table below lists the representation of parties in the 10th National Assembly.

Name		Main ideology	Position	Party leader	Deputies	Government
Equity Party		Populism; Liberal conservatism	Centre-right	Mohamed Melainine Ould Eyih	107 / 176	Government
Tewassoul		Sunni Islamism	Right-wing	Hamadi Ould Sid'El Moctar	11 / 176	Opposition
UDP		Centrism	Centre	Naha Mint Mouknass	10 / 176	External support
Hope; Mauritania	FRUD	Egalitarianism; Multiracialism	Left-wing	Amadou Tijane Diop	2 / 176	Opposition
Hope; Mauritania	MCC	Youth interests; Arab nationalism	Left-wing	Mohamed Lemine Ould Sidi Maouloud	1 / 176	Opposition
Hope; Mauritania	RDP	Democratic socialism; Marxism	Left-wing	Youssouf Ould Mohamed Issa	1 / 176	Opposition
Hope; Mauritania	PMF			Mbeireck Ould Mohamed	1 / 176	Opposition
AND		Social democracy	Centre	Yacoub Ould Moine	6 / 176	Government
El Islah		Populism; Reformism	Centre-right	Mohamed Ould Talebna	6 / 176	Government
Democratic; Alternation; Pole	RAG	Haratine interests; Anti-establishment		Biram Dah Abeid	4 / 176	Opposition
Democratic; Alternation; Pole	Sawab	Ba'athism; Arab nationalism	Syncretic	Abdesselam Ould Horma	1 / 176	Opposition
El Karama		Social liberalism; Social democracy	Centre	Cheikhna Ould Hajbou	5 / 176	External support
Nida El Watan		Mauritanian nationalism; Centralism	Far-right	Daoud Ould Ahmed Aicha	5 / 176	External support
CVE	AJD/MR	Fulani interests	Big tent	Ibrahima Moctar Sarr	4 / 176	Opposition
HATEM		Islamic democracy; Economic liberalism	Right-wing	Saleh Ould Hanenna	3 / 176	External support
HIWAR		Youth interests; Social conservatism	Right-wing	Valle Mint Mini	3 / 176	External support
El Vadila		Islamism	Right-wing	Ethmane Ould Cheikh Ahmed Eboul Mealy	3 / 176	External support
People's; Forces	FRUD	Egalitarianism; Multiracialism	Left-wing	Amadou Tijane Diop	2 / 176	Opposition
State of Justice		Populism; Social conservatism	Right-wing	Collective leadership	1 / 176	Opposition

=== Registered extra-parliamentary parties ===
- Republican Party for Democracy and Renewal (PRDR)
- Union of the Forces of Progress (UFP)
- Party of Unity and Development (PUD)
- Rally of Democratic Forces (RFD)
- Burst of Youth for the Nation (PSJN)
- El Ravah
- People's Progressive Alliance (APP)
- National Cohesion for Rights and the Construction of Generations (CNDCG/Ribat)
- Party of Construction and Progress (PCP)
- Centre through Action for Progress (CAP)

=== Unregistered parties ===
- Progressive Forces of Change (FPC)
- Khiar El Haq
- Kavana Movement
- Forward Mauritania (En Avant)

== Coalitions ==
- Coordination of Parties of the Majority
- Hope Mauritania
- Democratic Alternation Coalition (Sawab+)
- Coalition Living Together (CVE or AJD/MR+)
- State of Justice Coalition
- Alliance of People's Forces

== See also ==
- Politics of Mauritania
- List of political parties by country
- 2023 Mauritanian parliamentary elections
