= 10th National Assembly of Mauritania =

Incumbent National Assembly meeting of Mauritania

←	9th	11th	→
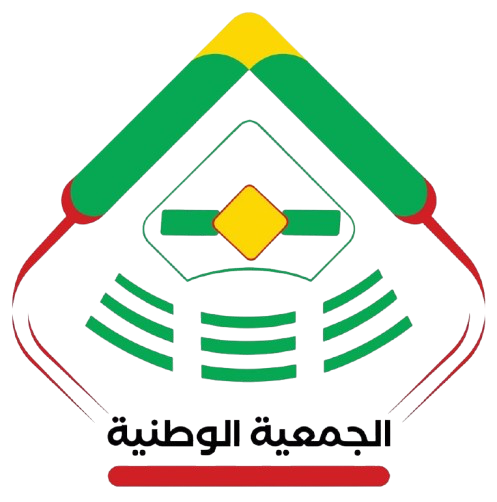

Overview
- Legislative body: National Assembly
- Term: 19 June 2023 –
- Election: 13 and 27 May 2023
- Website: www.parlement.mr

Deputies
- Members: 176
- President: Mohamed Ould Meguett (El Insaf)
- 1st Vice-President: Moussa Demba Sow (El Insaf)
- 2nd Vice-President: Ahmedou Ould M'Balla (Tewassoul)
- 3rd Vice-President: Ousmane Racine Sanghott (UDP)
- 4th Vice-President: Fatimetou Mint Habib (El Insaf)
- 5th Vice-President: Isselmou Ould Khatry (El Insaf)

Sessions
- Inaugural: 19 June 2023 – 21 June 2023
- First: 23 June 2023 – 1 August 2023

The 10th National Assembly is the current meeting of the National Assembly, the unicameral chamber of the Mauritanian Parliament, with the membership determined by the results of the parliamentary election held on 13 and 27 May 2023.

== Election ==
The 2023 Mauritanian parliamentary election was held on 13 and 27 May 2023. It saw El Insaf (the successor of the Union for the Republic) keep its majority in the National Assembly, with the Coordination of Parties of the Majority supporting the incumbent president Mohamed Ould Ghazouani holding a comfortable supermajority.

Party	National PR list		Total	
Party	Votes	%	Seats	±
El Insaf	342,153	35.26%	107	+14
Tewassoul	99,475	10.25%	11	-3
UDP	58,823	6.06%	10	-4
Sawab+	39,807	4.10%	5	+2
Hope Mauritania	32,315	3.33%	7	New
AND	31,987	3.30%	6	+2
El Islah	31,854	3.28%	6	+5
HATEM	28,124	2.90%	3	+2
El Karama	25,437	2.62%	5	-1
Nida El Watan	24,268	2.50%	5	+5
AJD/MR+	21,163	2.18%	4	+3
HIWAR	20,206	2.08%	3	+2
PMM	20,187	2.08%	1	+1
El Vadila	17,301	1.78%	2	+2
State of Justice	15,028	1.55%	1	+1
Others	136,120	14.03%	0	-12
Blank votes	26,250	2.70%		
Valid votes	970,498	75.88%		
Null votes	308,490	24.12%		
Seats			176	+19
Turnout	1,278,988	71.59%		
Abstentions	507,460	28.41%		
Registered voters	1,786,448			
Source: National Independent Election Commission (CENI)

== History ==
=== Election of the President of the National Assembly ===
The new National Assembly met for the first time on 19 June 2023, with Mohamed Ould Meguett (El Insaf) being elected as President of the National Assembly with the support of the Coordination of Parties of the Majority with an absolute majority in the first round.

Candidate	Party	Votes obtained
Required majority →		89 out of 176
Mohamed Bemba Meguett	El Insaf	137
Ahmedou Mohamed Mahfoudh M'Balla	Tewassoul	27
Abstentions		2
Null votes		3
Absentees		7

=== Lifted immunity of Mohamed Bouya Ould Cheikh Mohamed Vadel ===
On 22 July 2023 the State of Justice deputy Mohamed Bouya Ould Cheikh Mohamed Vadel reviewed during a parliamentary session an allegedly blasphemous text about Muhammad written by a student during the recent baccalaureate exams in the country, with Ould Cheikh Mohamed Vadel replacing the name of Muhammad in the text with the names of President Ould Ghazouani and his companions with Ghazouan's ministers. Ould Cheikh Mohamed Vadel later wrote on Facebook that his speech "was a hypothetical projection aimed at drawing attention to the severity of the insult against the Messenger of God (PBUH) and criticizing the government's position due to its indecisiveness in arresting the abuser and reluctance to refer it to the judiciary". Ould Cheikh Mohamed Vadel later added on Facebook that "some in bad faith" considered his words as "unbearable", pointing out that the President of the National Assembly "prevented" him from a point of order to "clarify his position".

Ruling party El Insaf and the presidential majority immediately condemned the declarations. Deputy Cheikh Mohamed Abderrahmane Moin (AND) condemned Ould Cheikh Mohamed Vadel's speech and asking deputies to stand up in protest, with most doing so and some hesitating between remaining on their seats and standing up. Prime Minister Mohamed Ould Bilal, who was attending the session, replied on a 24-minute-long speech to Ould Mohamed Vadel, saying that "insulting the President of the Republic under the dome of Parliament is unacceptable". El Insaf's leader Mohamed Melainine Ould Eyih also replied to Ould Cheikh Mohamed Vadel on Facebook, saying that what happened was "a sign of disregard for the law and contempt for democratic institutions, as well as an attack against the feelings of every Muslim citizen and every person with sound awareness".

The High Authority for Press and Audiovisual (HAPA) forced Ould Cheikh Mohamed Vadel and the National Assembly's TV channel to delete the statement.

Two days later, the Bureau of the National Assembly decided to suspend Ould Cheikh Mohamed Vadel for four sessions from the National Assembly. Opposition deputies withdrew from the parliamentary session of that day in protest, with the President of the National Assembly Mohamed Ould Meguett confirming that the decision was "definitive" and taken by the Bureau "that represents everyone", noting that it was taken on the basis of the internal rules of the National Assembly. Ould Cheikh Mohamed Vadel said in a live broadcast on his Facebook page he "expected to be subjected to more penalties", with him considering that the swift response of the National Assembly against him reveals that supporting Muhammad is not a "priority" for the "regime", comparing it with how the writer of the insulting Baccalaureate text wasn't judged yet.

Minister of Justice Mohamed Mahmoud Ould Boya formally handed the parliament a request to lift the immunity of Ould Cheikh Mohamed Vadel on 24 July. The National Assembly started forming the 13-member commission mandated by the inner rules of the National Assembly. According to it, El Insaf group could assign 8 deputies, the groups of the parliamentary majority (UDP, Trust and Justice) 3 deputies and the Tewassoul group and FRUD group one each. FRUD, Sawab, Tewassoul and the pro-government Trust group all refused to join the committee.

On 27 July the President of the National Assembly announced the names of the members appointed to the immunity lifting committee: El Insaf appointed 10 members and three pro-government groups (UDP, Trust and Justice) appointed one each. Ould Cheikh Mohamed Vadel was summoned the next day to appear before the committee, which he refused to do.

The National Assembly voted to lift the parliamentary immunity of deputy Mohamed Bouya Ould Cheikh Mohamed Vadel, with 128 members voting in favour and 6 against. The opposition boycotted the session, with Hope Mauritania deputy Mohamed Lemine Ould Sidi Maouloud condemning it.

A joint statement from all opposition groups criticised what they considered "the encroachment of the executive authority over the legislative apparatus", considering that the lifting of the immunity was unconstitutional as "the explicit constitutional texts provide immunity for deputies for their opinions while performing their duties, whatever the position on these opinions". President of the FRUD group Kadiata Malick Diallo went as far as considering the decision as a "coup against the constitution" and a "murder of democracy". She also added that immunity lifting revealed that the legislative authority has no value against the executive authority, noting that the decision to lift immunity was made at the request of the executive authority "and the legislative authority did not object to it".

"Today is a dark day in the history of the National Assembly. This is not a law debate session, nor a normal intervention session. Representatives are arrested as thieves are arrested."

— Mohamed Lemine Ould Sidi Maouloud

Ould Cheikh Mohamed Vadel tried to attend the parliamentary session held the day after his immunity was lifted. The police summoned him on 31 July, with his lawyer reporting he wasn't allowed to meet him. A video Ould Cheikh Mohamed Vadel recorded before his arrest was released, with him mentioning the yearly occurrence of cases of insults against Muhammad in Mauritania that went unpunished and adding "that all other tracks are not important and should not distract the Mauritanian people from defending the Prophet (PBUH)".

A peaceful protest held by supporters of Mohamed Bouya in front of the Ministry of Justice was dispersed by the police, with the leader of the Kavana Movement (member of the State of Justice Coalition) Yacoub Ould Lemrabett declaring that he and young people from the movement were "subjected to repression and beatings by the police".

The Judiciary Police referred the deputy to the public prosecutor on 3 August, three days after his arrest, with a request to imprison him. The Public Prosecutor charged him with "publication of insult, defamation and slander against the President of the Republic". An investigative judge in the wilaya of Nouakchott-Ouest rejected the Public Prosecution's request to refer deputy Mohamed Bouya Ould Cheikh Mohamed Vadel to prison, deciding to place him under judicial control instead.

On 7 August 2023, an order was issued remanding MP Mohamed Bouye Ould Cheikh Mohamed Vadel to prison, overturning the earlier decision to keep him under judicial control, and he then remained in detention for nearly three months. During this period, independent Mauritanian outlets reported that his health deteriorated and that he was transferred from custody to hospital on more than one occasion. Political groups, including the “تحالف أمل موريتانيا” coalition, issued statements holding the authorities responsible for safeguarding his health while in detention. On 2 November 2023, he was granted provisional release following a court decision ordering the end of his pre-trial detention.

=== Suspension of Mariem Cheikh Samba Dieng ===
Deputy Mariem Cheikh Samba Dieng, elected under Sawab–RAG's list, was suspended from four sessions on 24 January 2024 by the Bureau of the National Assembly after calling the Prime Minister a "guardian dog of a corrupt system", extending the same denomination to the Haratin and Black Mauritanians on the government. Her party RAG called for a press conference on the same day to defend their deputy, with Biram Dah Abeid saying that she didn't directly name or target the Prime Minister.

== Bureau of the National Assembly ==
The five vice-presidents and secretaries were elected on 21 June 2023.

- President: Mohamed Bemba Meguett (El Insaf)

=== Vice-Presidency ===
- 1st Vice-president: Moussa Demba Sow (El Insaf)
- 2nd Vice-president: Ahmedou Mohamed Mahfoudh M'Balla (Tewassoul)
- 3rd Vice-president: Ousmane Racine Sanghott (UDP)
- 4th Vice-president: Fatimetou Khlivit Amour Habib (El Insaf)
- 5th Vice-president: Isselmou Khatry Mohamed Jiddou (El Insaf)

=== Secretaries ===
- 1st Secretary: Cheikh Mohamed Abderrahmane Moine (AND)
- 2nd Secretary: Mohamed Abdalahy Ely Telmoudy (El Insaf)
- 3rd Secretary: Khalidou Samba Sow (AJD/MR)
- 4th Secretary: Yakharé Biranté Soumaré (El Insaf)
- 5th Secretary: Khadijetou Abdoulaye Wane (El Insaf)

== Parliamentary groups ==
Composition of the National Assembly as of 26 June 2023
Parliamentary group	Members	President
El Insaf: • El Insaf (107); • HIWAR (3)	110	Mohamed Lemine Hamoud Amar
Trust: • El Islah (6); • El Karama (5); • HATEM (3); • El Vadila (2); • PMM (1)	17	Saleh Mohamedou Hanana
Tewassoul	11	Yahya Aboubecrine Sid Elemine
Justice: • AND (6); • Nida El Watan (5)	11	Daoud Abdallahi Ahmed Aicha
Union for Democracy and Progress	10	Naha Hamdi Mouknass
Republican Front for Unity and Democracy	7	Kadiata Malick Diallo
Non-attached members (Note: Sawab+ and AJD/MR+ are expected to eventually form their own parliamentary group together.): • Sawab+ (5); • AJD/MR+ (4); • UPC+ (1)	10	–

== Committees ==
On 5 July 2023 the National Assembly established its five specialised commissions.

Economic Affairs

Position	Member	Party
President	Mohamed Lemine El Moctar Sidi Maouloud	Hope Mauritania
Vice-president	Mohamed El Moctar Mohamed Mahmoud El Moktar	El Karama
Reporters	Jaafar Melaynine Hachem	El Insaf
Reporters	Almamy Ilo Ba	UDP
Reporters	El Vadil Siddaty Ahmed Louly	El Insaf
Secretaries	Ibrahima Mamadou Kebé	El Insaf
Secretaries	Zehoura Cheikhna Beidiya	Tewassoul

Finances

Position	Member	Party
President	Moustapha Sidi Hamoud	El Insaf
Vice-president	El Mourtadha Essalem T'Feil	Tewassoul
Reporters	El Bou Emoud Gelaa	El Insaf
Reporters	Mohamed El Moctar Mohamed El Moustapha Mohamed El Hassene	AND
Reporters	Fatimetou Salma Mohamedou Sidi Hamoud	El Insaf
Secretaries	Salek Dah Ena	El Insaf
Secretaries	Tombé Amara Camara	UDP

Islamic Orientation, Human Resources and Socio-Cultural Affairs

Position	Member	Party
President	Mohamed Ahmed Salem Talebna	El Islah
Vice-president	Zeine Alabidine El Mounir Toulba	El Insaf
Reporters	Mohamed Vih El Barka Bah	El Insaf
Reporters	Khally Mamadou Diallo	Hope Mauritania
Reporters	El Atigh Mohamed Mohamed	El Insaf
Secretaries	Behaida Khouade Khattry	Nida El Watan
Secretaries	Fatimetou Mohamed Abdellahi El Hacen	El Insaf

Foreign Relations

Position	Member	Party
President	El Moctar Khalifa Khalifa	El Insaf
Vice-president	Vala Seidna Aly Miny	HIWAR
Reporters	Hamada Khatary Hamadi	El Insaf
Reporters	Mariem Cheikh Samba Dieng	Sawab+
Reporters	Ahmed Deyt Mohamed El Moctar M'Heimed	El Insaf
Secretaries	Abdou Louleid Wadad	El Islah
Secretaries	Syedna Aly Hamady El Kowry	El Insaf

Justice, Defense and Interior

Position	Member	Party
President	Ahmed Ould Zein Limane	El Insaf
Vice-president	Aboul Maouahib Mohamed El Houssein Habiboullah	El Insaf
Reporters	Mohamed Yayha Elmoustapha	HATEM
Reporters	Moussa Mamadou Dia	El Insaf
Reporters	Ousmane Oumar Ba	AJD/MR+
Secretaries	El Hacen Mohamed Belid	El Insaf
Secretaries	Hachem Samoury M'Bareck Sebkha	El Insaf

== Deputies ==
Electoral district	Deputy	Affiliation
National list	Mohamed Bemba Meguett	El Insaf
National list	Siham Mohamed Yahya Najem	El Insaf
National list	Mohamed Lemine Hamoud Amar	El Insaf
National list	Mariem El Hacen Oumar	El Insaf
National list	Youssouf Tijani Sylia	El Insaf
National list	Hamadi Khatary Hamadi	El Insaf
National list	Nouha Oumar Abidine Sidi	El Insaf
National list	Ahmedou Mohamed Mahfoudh M'Balla	Tewassoul
National list	Seddave Sidi Brahim Adda	Tewassoul
National list	Ousmane Racine Sanghott	UDP
National list	Biram Dah Dah Abeid	Sawab+
National list	El Id Mohameden M'Bareck	Hope Mauritania
National list	Yacoub Mohamed Abderrahmane Moine	AND
National list	Mohamed Ahmed Salem Talebna	El Islah
National list	Saleh Mohamedou Hanana	HATEM
National list	Nagi Mohamed Eterekzi	El Karama
National list	Daoud Abdallahi Ahmed Aicha	Nida El Watan
National list	Ibrahima Moctar Sarr	AJD/MR+
National list	Mohamed Ahmed Mohamed Cheikh Sid' Ahmed Wejih	HIWAR
National list	El Khalil Mohamedou Ennahoui	PMM
Women's national list	Fatimetou Khlivit Amour Habib	El Insaf
Women's national list	Saadani Mohamed Khaitour	El Insaf
Women's national list	Djeinaba Abdoul Samba Korka	El Insaf
Women's national list	Fatimetou Mohamed Abdellahi El Hacen	El Insaf
Women's national list	Mamah Mahfoudh Lemrabott	El Insaf
Women's national list	Salma Ramadhane Amar Cheine	El Insaf
Women's national list	Loula Ahmed Zarough	El Insaf
Women's national list	Mounina Ahmed Salem J'Reivine	Tewassoul
Women's national list	Zehoura Cheikhna Beidiya	Tewassoul
Women's national list	Naha Hamdi Mouknass	UDP
Women's national list	Mariem Cheikh Samba Dieng	Sawab+
Women's national list	Kadiata Malick Diallo	Hope Mauritania
Women's national list	Messouda Baham Mohamed Laghdaf	El Islah
Women's national list	Oumeya Said Abd El Ghader	HATEM
Women's national list	Aminetou Sidi Mohmad Hamadi	AND
Women's national list	Khaire Sidaty El Wedani	Nida El Watan
Women's national list	Tahra Mohamed Sidi Aly	El Karama
Women's national list	Mouna Sid'Ahmed Sebty	El Vadila
Women's national list	Vala Seidna Aly Miny	HIWAR
Women's national list	Saoudatou Mamadou Wane	AJD/MR+
Youth's national list	Khadijetou Abdoulaye Wane	El Insaf
Youth's national list	Isselmou Khatry Mohamed Jiddou	El Insaf
Youth's national list	Mohamed Vih El Barka Bah	El Insaf
Youth's national list	Jemile Mohamedou Nehah	El Insaf
Youth's national list	El Mourtadha Essalem T'Feil	Tewassoul
Youth's national list	El Hacen Kaber Sidi Brahim	UDP
Youth's national list	Aminetou El Hacen Boughel	Sawab+
Youth's national list	Khally Mamadou Diallo	Hope Mauritania
Youth's national list	Mohamed Sid'El Moctar Oumar	El Islah
Youth's national list	Mohamed Yayha Elmoustapha	HATEM
Youth's national list	Sid'Ahmed Ahmed Megaya	AND
Adel Begrou	Ahmoudeitt Abderrahmane Chein	El Insaf
Adel Begrou	El Vadil Siddaty Ahmed Louly	El Insaf
Aïoun	Oumar Abdi Ahmed Said	El Insaf
Aïoun	El Ghassem Sidi Ghoueizi	El Insaf
Akjoujt	Sid'Ahmed Mohamed El Hassen Doueiry	El Insaf
Aleg	El Bou Emoud Gelaa	El Insaf
Aleg	Fatimetou Blal M'Bareck	El Insaf
Amourj	Ahmed Deyt Mohamed El Moctar M'Heimed	El Insaf
Amourj	Mohamed Lemine Mohamed Guiye	El Insaf
Aoujeft	Mohamed Abdalahy Ely Telmoudy	El Insaf
Atar	El Houssein Mahfoudh Bouboutt	El Insaf
Atar	Ahmed Louleid Abdalla	El Insaf
Bababé	Oumar Abdoulaye Sow	El Insaf
Bababé	Adama Boubou Dieng	El Insaf
Barkéol	Moussa El Bechir Mohamed El Mehdy	El Insaf
Barkéol	Mohamedou Boukhreysse Abdallahi	El Insaf
Bassiknou	Mohamed Mahmoud Sidi Hanana	El Insaf
Bassiknou	Vih El Mane Khaina Ghacha	El Insaf
Bénichab	Ali Sidi Mohamed Dewla	El Insaf
Bir Moghrein	Mohamed Salem Ahmed Ahmed Noueygued	El Islah
Boghé	Moctar Al Housseynou Lam	El Insaf
Boghé	El Atigh Mohamed Mohamed	El Insaf
Boumdeid	Mohamed Lemine Mohamed Abdellahi El Ghazwany	El Insaf
Boutilimit	El Vouad Ahmed Salem Bouna Moctar	El Insaf
Boutilimit	Aboul Maouahib Mohamed El Houssein Habiboullah	El Insaf
Chami	Lemrabott Houmeya Tanji	El Insaf
Chinguetti	El Bou Hamdy Abdarrahmane	El Insaf
Djiguenni	Taleb Moustaphe Mohamed Lemine Sidi Abdalla	El Insaf
Djiguenni	Syedna Aly Hamady El Kowry	El Insaf
F'Déirick	Khaddad Lemrabott Moctar	El Insaf
Ghabou	Hajiratou Khalidou Ba	UDP
Ghabou	Abibou Moussa Dramé	UDP
Guerou	El Moukhtar Mohamed Limam	Tewassoul
Guerou	El Ghassem Mohamed Ahmed Taleb Ebeidy	El Vadila
Kaédi	Moussa Demba Sow	El Insaf
Kaédi	Mohamed Abdoul N'Diaye	UDP
Kaédi	Ousmane Oumar Ba	AJD/MR+
Kankoussa	Ibrahim Kaba Barick	El Insaf
Kankoussa	Chriv Sidi Ali Sidi Ali	El Insaf
Keur Macène	Ailoune Mohameden Mahmoud	El Insaf
Keur Macène	Weitate Sidi Yaaraf M'boirick	El Insaf
Kiffa	Lemrabott Mohamed Mohamed	Nida El Watan
Kiffa	Khattry Cheikh Mahmoud	El Insaf
Kiffa	Mohamed Mahmoud Cheikh El Ghouth	HIWAR
Koubenni	Babah Cheikhne Ahmed Babou	El Insaf
Koubenni	Fatma Sidi Mohamed Ely Mahmoud	UDP
Koubenni	Behaida Khouade Khattry	Nida El Watan
Lexeiba	Mohamed Abdallahi Mamoudou Kane	El Insaf
M'Bagne	Amadou Moctar Ibra Niang	El Insaf
M'Bagne	Ibrahima Mamadou Kebé	El Insaf
M'Bout	Jaafar Melaynine Hachem	El Insaf
M'Bout	El Hacen Cheikh Baha	El Karama
M'Bout	Yarba Sidi Breick	AND
Maghama	Mamadou Mamadou Niang	El Insaf
Maghama	Hachem Samoury M'Bareck Sebkha	El Insaf
Magta Lahjar	Ahmed El Mally Mohamed Menane	El Insaf
Magta Lahjar	Fatimetou Salma Mohamedou Sidi Hamoud	El Insaf
Male	Sidna Sidi Mohamed Ahmed Ely	El Insaf
Male	Zein El Abidine Sidi Ahmed Ahmed El Hadi	El Insaf
Méderdra	Mohamed El Khamess Sidi Abdallah Sidi Abdallah	El Insaf
Méderdra	Moustapha Boulah Souheib	El Insaf
Monguel	H'bib Brahim Diah	El Insaf
Monguel	Sidi Ahmed Ghaber	El Insaf
Moudjéria	Oumoukelthoum El Yassa El Yassa Soueid Ahmed	El Insaf
Moudjéria	Elyakher Yesslem Sidi El Moctar	El Insaf
N'beiket Lahwach	Salek Dah Ena	El Insaf
Néma	Mohamed El Ghaith El Hadrami Cheikh Mohamed Vadel	El Insaf
Néma	Vatimetou Mohamed Yarbe Jiyid	El Insaf
Nouadhibou	El Ghassem Bellali Bellali	El Karama
Nouadhibou	Mohamed Abdellahi El Mamy El Ghailany	El Insaf
Nouadhibou	Aziza Saleck Jiddou	Tewassoul
Nouadhibou	Khalidou Samba Sow	AJD/MR+
Nouakchott-Nord	Ahmed Jiddou Zein Limane	El Insaf
Nouakchott-Nord	Zeine Alabidine El Mounir Toulba	El Insaf
Nouakchott-Nord	Isselkou Mohamed Salem Bahah	Tewassoul
Nouakchott-Nord	Cheikh Mohamed Abderrahmane Moine	AND
Nouakchott-Nord	Abd Selam Horma Horma	Sawab+
Nouakchott-Nord	Mohamed Lemine El Moctar Sidi Maouloud	Hope Mauritania
Nouakchott-Nord	Mohamed El Moctar Sidi Zoghmane	UDP
Nouakchott-Ouest	Baba Mohamed El Moctar Ahmed Lebrahim	El Insaf
Nouakchott-Ouest	Rabya Cherif Haïdara	El Insaf
Nouakchott-Ouest	Mamadou Demba Ba	Tewassoul
Nouakchott-Ouest	Balla Abdou Touré	Hope Mauritania
Nouakchott-Ouest	El Wedia Mohamed Al Vagha	El Islah
Nouakchott-Ouest	Mohamed Bouya Cheikh El Mamoune Cheikh Mohamed Vadel	State of Justice
Nouakchott-Ouest	Mohamed El Moctar Mohamed El Moustapha Mohamed El Hassene	AND
Nouakchott-Sud	Maimouna Ahmed Salem Yahdhih	El Insaf
Nouakchott-Sud	El Moctar Khalifa Khalifa	El Insaf
Nouakchott-Sud	El Hacen Mohamed Belid	El Insaf
Nouakchott-Sud	Yahya Aboubecrine Sid Elemine	Tewassoul
Nouakchott-Sud	Amadou Tidjane Abou Diop	Hope Mauritania
Nouakchott-Sud	Ghame Achour Salem	Sawab+
Nouakchott-Sud	Mohamed El Moctar Mohamed Mahmoud El Moktar	El Karama
Ouad Naga	Jemal Mohamed Yedaly	El Insaf
Ouad Naga	Saleck Mohameden Haden	El Insaf
Ouadane	Abdou Louleid Wadad	El Islah
Oualata	Sidi Cheikh Diajouh	El Insaf
Ould Yengé	Almamy Ilo Ba	UDP
Ould Yengé	Tombé Amara Camara	UDP
R'Kiz	Mohamed Mohamed Abdallahi El Moustapha	El Insaf
R'Kiz	Abdellahi El Wely El Hacen Cheikh Mohamedou Yahya	El Insaf
Rosso	Mohamedhen Vall Mohamed El Alem	El Insaf
Rosso	Amet Mohamed Badien Fall	El Insaf
Sélibaby	Sidney Dramane Sokhona	El Insaf
Sélibaby	Habsa Yaya Kane	El Insaf
Tamchekett	Ahamdy Hamadi Ahamdy	El Insaf
Tamchekett	Mohamed Abderrahmane Mohamed Mahmoud Sabar	El Insaf
Tékane	Aly Mamoudou Kane	El Insaf
Tékane	Ahmed Mohamed Abbe	El Insaf
Tichitt	Bouya Ahmed Chrif Chrif El Mokhtar	El Insaf
Tidjikja	Ghleywa Eman Lahdhana	El Insaf
Tidjikja	Moustapha Sidi Hamoud	El Insaf
Timbédra	Sidelemine Sid M'Hamed Emine	El Insaf
Timbédra	Mohamedou Ahmedou Ahmedou	El Insaf
Tintane	Sidi Mohamed Mohamed Lemine Seyidi	El Insaf
Tintane	Moulkhaïry Mohamed Lemine Cheikh El Ghazwany	El Insaf
Touil	Mohamed Cheikh Sidiya Toulba	Nida El Watan
Wompou	Yakharé Biranté Soumaré	El Insaf
Wompou	Moussa Mamadou Dia	El Insaf
Zouérate	Hamoud Ely El Malha	El Insaf
Zouérate	Idoumou Mohamed Haky	El Insaf
Africa	Ahmedou Mohamed Bouvecha	El Insaf
America	Yahya Loud Seffah	Hope Mauritania
Asia	Abdallahi Sidi Mohamed Bouka	Tewassoul
Europe	Issa Mansega Ansoumane Diawara	El Insaf
Source: National Independent Election Commission (CENI)
