= Next Mauritanian parliamentary election =

- By 2028
- All 176 seats in the National Assembly; 89 seats needed for a majority
Party	Leader	Current seats
El Insaf	Sid'Ahmed Ould Mohamed	107
Tewassoul	Hamadi Ould Sid'El Moctar	11
UDP	Naha Mint Mouknass	10
AND	Yacoub Ould Moine	6
El Islah	Mohamed Ould Talebna	6
Hope MR	Collective leadership	5
Sawab–RAG	Biram Dah Abeid	5
AJD/MR+	Ibrahima Moctar Sarr	4
El Karama	Cheikhna Ould Hajbou	5
NW	Daoud Ould Ahmed Aicha	5
HATEM	Saleh Ould Hanenna	3
HIWAR	Valle Mint Mini	3
El Vadila	Ethmane Ould Eboul Mealy	2
People's Forces	El Id Ould Mohameden	2
Independent	–	2
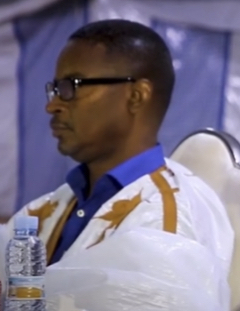
Incumbent Prime Minister
Mohamed Ould Bilal; El Insaf

The next Mauritanian parliamentary election will be held by 2028 to elect the 176 seats of the 11th National Assembly of Mauritania.

== Electoral system ==
The 176 members of the National Assembly are elected by two methods (with Mauritanians being able to cast four different votes in a parallel voting system); 125 are elected from single- or multi-member electoral districts based on the departments (or moughataas) that the country is subdivided in (which the exception of Nouakchott, which is divided in three 7-seat constituencies based on the three regions (or wilayas) the city is subdivided into using either the two-round system or proportional representation; in single-member constituencies candidates require a majority of the vote to be elected in the first round and a plurality in the second round. In two-seat constituencies, voters vote for a party list (which must contain one man and one woman); if no list receives more than 50% of the vote in the first round, a second round is held, with the winning party taking both seats. In constituencies with three or more seats, closed list proportional representation is used, with seats allocated using the largest remainder method. For three-seat constituencies, party lists must include a female candidate in first or second on the list; for larger constituencies a zipper system is used, with alternate male and female candidates. The Mauritanian diaspora gets allocated four two-round majoritarian seats.

The remaining 51 seats are elected from three nationwide constituencies, also using closed list proportional representation: a 20-seat national list (which uses a zipper system), a 20-seat women's national list and a new 11-seat youth list (with two reserved for people with special needs), which also uses a zipper system to guarantee the representation of women.

== Opinion polls ==
=== Party identification ===
Polling firm	Fieldwork date	Sample size	El Insaf	RNRD	UDP	Sawab–RAG	El Islah	HATEM	El Karama	AJD/MR	HIWAR	UFP	El Vadila	RFD	PSJN	APP	Ribat	Others	N/A	No party identification
Afrobarometer	24 December 2024 – 17 January 2025	1,200	16.7	3.9	0.8	0.4	0.1	—N/a	0.3	0.7	0.1	0.8	0.1	0.6	—N/a	0.2	0.4	0.3	0.8	73.6
Afrobarometer	6 November – 6 December 2023	1,200	28.5	4.3	1.5	0.2	0.5	0.5	0.8	0.3	0.1	1.5	0.2	1.6	0.2	0.8	0.2	0.1	3.6	55.2
2023 election	13 May 2023 (national list vote)	–	35.3	10.2	6.1	4.1	3.3	2.9	2.6	2.2	2.1	1.8	1.8	1.5	1.5	1.3	1.1	22.4	–	–
