= 2023 Mauritanian regional elections =

- 13 May 2023
- 285 seats in 13 regional councils
- Turnout: 71.48% (▼1.14pp)
Party	Vote %	Seats	+/–
El Insaf	43.13	123	−44
Tewassoul	13.49	37	+6
UDP	7.64	28	+4
El Islah	4.70	15	+15
Sawab–RAG	4.28	12	+11
AND	2.88	11	+10
El Karama	2.71	10	+8
HATEM	2.07	7	−14
UFP	1.68	5	+2
Hope MR	1.60	4	New
APP	1.58	3	0
El Vadila	1.52	4	+2
NW	1.19	4	+4
RFD	1.18	2	+1
AJD/MR+	1.12	3	−3
PMM	1.06	2	+2
Ribat	0.86	3	+3
HIWAR	0.86	4	+4
El Ravah	0.85	2	+2
CAP	0.78	1	New
CED	0.67	1	New
PSJN	0.53	1	+1
PUD	0.37	1	New
PRDR	0.37	1	New
This lists parties that won seats. See the complete results below.
Control of regional administrations before the election
El Insaf-led government

Regional elections were held in Mauritania on 13 May 2023, alongside parliamentary and local elections.

The elections were the first regional elections held after the first peaceful transition of power in the country as a result of the 2019 presidential elections, in which Mohamed Ould Ghazouani was elected president after incumbent Mohamed Ould Abdel Aziz was not able to run due to the two-term constitutional limit.

== Background ==
Regional councils were first elected in Mauritania in 2018 following a 2017 constitutional referendum that abolished the Senate, replacing it with regional councils in every wilaya and a single one for the city of Nouakchott.

Those first 2018 regional elections led to the ruling party Union for the Republic (which rebranded as El Insaf in July 2022) taking control of all regional councils with an absolute majority thanks to the two-round system then applied to elect regional councils.

On 26 September 2022 an agreement between the Ministry of the Interior and Decentralisation and all political parties registered in Mauritania was reached in order to renew the Independent National Electoral Commission and hold the elections in the first semester of 2023, with parties justifying it due to climatic and logistical conditions.

== Election system ==
On 26 September 2022 all Mauritanian political parties reached an agreement sponsored by the Ministry of Interior and Decentralisation to reform the election system ahead of the upcoming elections after weeks of meetings between all parties.

In this election, regional councils will be elected in a single round using proportional representation through the largest remainder method, with no threshold being applied. The head of the list that gets the most votes will automatically become president of the regional council.

== Regional governments ==
The following table lists party control in each regional council. Gains for a party are highlighted in that party's colour.

Region	Current control	New control
Adrar	El Insaf	El Insaf
Assaba	El Insaf	El Insaf
Brakna	El Insaf	El Insaf
Dakhlet Nouadhibou	El Insaf	El Insaf
Gorgol	El Insaf	El Insaf
Guidimagha	El Insaf	El Insaf
Hodh Ech Chargui	El Insaf	El Insaf
Hodh El Gharbi	El Insaf	El Insaf
Inchiri	El Insaf	El Insaf
Nouakchott	El Insaf	El Insaf
Tagant	El Insaf	El Insaf
Tiris Zemmour	El Insaf	El Insaf
Trarza	El Insaf	El Insaf

== Results ==
Party	Votes	%	Seats
El Insaf	433,556	43.13%	124
National Rally for Reform and Development (Tewassoul)	133,265	13.26%	35
National Rally for Reform and Development, Sawab and allies (Tewassoul-Sawab) (Note: Tewassoul and Sawab ran together in Tiris Zemmour.)	2,311	0.23%	2
Total for Tewassoul-led lists	135,576	13.49%	37
Union for Democracy and Progress (UDP)	76,803	7.64%	28
El Islah	47,252	4.70%	15
Sawab and allies (Sawab–RAG)	40,638	4.04%	11
Sawab, allies, Republican Front for Unity and Democracy and allies (Sawab-FRUD) (Note: Sawab and FRUD ran together in Assaba.)	2,442	0.24%	1
Total for Sawab–RAG-led lists	43,080	4.28%	12
National Democratic Alliance (AND)	28,902	2.88%	11
El Karama	27,230	2.71%	10
Mauritanian Party of Union and Change (HATEM)	20,827	2.07%	7
Union of the Forces of Progress (UFP)	13,954	1.39%	4
Union of the Forces of Progress and Rally of Democratic Forces (UFP-RFD) (Note: UFP and RFD ran together in Dakhlet Nouadhibou.)	1,885	0.19%	1
Union of the Forces of Progress, Alliance for Justice and Democracy/Movement for Renewal and allies (UFP-AJD/MR+) (Note: UFP and AJD/MR+ ran together in Tiris Zemmour.)	653	0.06%	0
Union of the Forces of Progress, Rally of Democratic Forces, Alliance for Justice and Democracy/Movement for Renewal and allies (UFP-RFD-AJD/MR+) (Note: UFP, RFD and AJD/MR+ ran together in Inchiri.)	374	0.04%	0
Total for UFP-led lists	16,866	1.68%	5
Republican Front for Unity and Democracy and allies (Hope Mauritania)	14,205	1.41%	3
Republican Front for Unity and Democracy, allies and People's Progressive Alliance (FRUD-APP) (Note: FRUD and APP ran together in Tiris Zemmour.)	1,949	0.19%	1
Total for Hope Mauritania-led lists	16,154	1.60%	4
People's Progressive Alliance (APP)	15,913	1.58%	3
El Vadila	15,313	1.52%	4
Nida El Watan	11,957	1.19%	4
Rally of Democratic Forces (RFD)	11,906	1.18%	2
Alliance for Justice and Democracy/Movement for Renewal and allies (AJD/MR+)	11,227	1.12%	3
Party of the Mauritanian Masses (PMM)	10,612	1.06%	2
National Cohesion for Rights and the Construction of Generations (Ribat)	8,673	0.86%	3
Party of Conciliation and Prosperity (HIWAR)	8,627	0.86%	4
El Ravah	8,575	0.85%	2
Centre through Action for Progress (CAP)	7,821	0.78%	1
Union for Planning and Building and allies (State of Justice)	6,748	0.67%	1
Burst of Youth for the Nation (PSJN)	5,329	0.53%	1
Party of Unity and Development (PUD)	3,707	0.37%	1
Republican Party for Democracy and Renewal (PRDR)	2,922	0.29%	1
Party of Construction and Progress (PCP)	2,180	0.22%	0
Blank votes	27,429	2.73%	
Valid votes	1,005,185	79.71%	
Null votes	255,880	20.29%	
Seats		▲2	285
Turnout	1,261,065	71.48%	
Abstentions	503,094	28.52%	
Registered voters	1,764,159		
Source: National Independent Election Commission (CENI)
Footnotes:

== Summary by region ==
=== Adrar ===
Party	Votes	%	Seats	±
El Insaf	16,221	48.81%	8	-1
El Islah	6,955	20.93%	3	New
National Rally for Reform and Development (Tewassoul)	3,642	10.96%	2	=
National Democratic Alliance (AND)	1,320	3.97%	1	New
Mauritanian Party of Union and Change (HATEM)	1,077	3.24%	1	New
Sawab–RAG	867	2.61%	0	-1
People's Progressive Alliance (APP)	856	2.58%	0	-1
National Cohesion for Rights and the Construction of Generations (Ribat)	573	1.72%	0	New
Rally of Democratic Forces (RFD)	531	1.60%	0	=
Blank votes	1,194	3.58%		
Valid votes	33,236	86.63%		
Null votes	5,130	13.37%		
Seats			15	=
Turnout	38,366	71.94%		
Abstentions	14,965	28.06%		
Registered voters	53,331			
Source: National Independent Election Commission (CENI)

=== Assaba ===
Party	Votes	%	Seats	±
El Insaf	40,617	46.89%	12	-4
National Rally for Reform and Development (Tewassoul)	18,390	21.23%	5	n/a
Nida El Watan	11,957	13.80%	4	New
El Islah	4,723	5.45%	1	+1
Mauritanian Party of Union and Change (HATEM)	2,670	3.08%	1	n/a
Union of the Forces of Progress (UFP)	2,576	2.97%	1	+1
Sawab and Republican Front for Unity and Democracy (Sawab-FRUD)	2,442	2.82%	1	New
People's Progressive Alliance (APP)	736	0.85%	0	New
National Cohesion for Rights and the Construction of Generations (Ribat)	655	0.76%	0	New
Blank votes	1,858	2.15%		
Valid votes	86,624	71.77%		
Null votes	34,072	28.23%		
Seats			25	=
Turnout	120,696	73.40%		
Abstentions	43,746	26.52%		
Registered voters	164,442			
Source: National Independent Election Commission (CENI)

=== Brakna ===
Party	Votes	%	Seats	±
El Insaf	55,313	50.22%	13	-1
National Rally for Reform and Development (Tewassoul)	9,443	8.57%	2	-1
Union for Democracy and Progress (UDP)	7,990	7.25%	2	New
El Karama	6,694	6.08%	2	+1
El Vadila	5,682	5.16%	1	-1
Party of Conciliation and Prosperity (HIWAR)	5,423	4.92%	1	New
Union of the Forces of Progress (UFP)	4,214	3.83%	1	New
Sawab–RAG	3,896	3.54%	1	=
People's Progressive Alliance (APP)	3,456	3.14%	1	=
National Democratic Alliance (AND)	2,209	2.01%	1	=
Rally of Democratic Forces (RFD)	2,083	1.89%	0	-1
Blank votes	3,734	3.39%		
Valid votes	110,137	79.92%		
Null votes	27,678	20.08%		
Seats			25	=
Turnout	137,815	76.53%		
Abstentions	42,263	23.47%		
Registered voters	180,078			
Source: National Independent Election Commission (CENI)

=== Dakhlet Nouadhibou ===
Party	Votes	%	Seats	±
El Insaf	10,470	26.33%	6	-5
El Karama	7,742	19.47%	4	New
National Rally for Reform and Development (Tewassoul)	3,858	9.70%	2	-6
Sawab–RAG	2,412	6.07%	1	+1
Alliance for Justice and Democracy/Movement for Renewal (AJD/MR)	2,313	5.82%	1	+1
Republican Front for Unity and Democracy (FRUD)	1,958	4.92%	1	New
Union of the Forces of Progress and Rally of Democratic Forces (UFP-RFD)	1,885	4.74%	1	+1
Union for Democracy and Progress (UDP)	1,608	4.04%	1	+1
National Cohesion for Rights and the Construction of Generations (Ribat)	1,033	2.60%	1	n/a
Party of Conciliation and Prosperity (HIWAR)	973	2.45%	1	New
National Democratic Alliance (AND)	955	2.40%	1	n/a
El Islah	800	2.01%	1	+1
Burst of Youth for the Nation (PSJN)	734	1.85%	0	New
People's Progressive Alliance (APP)	627	1.58%	0	n/a
El Ravah	580	1.46%	0	New
Party of Unity and Development (PUD)	421	1.06%	0	=
El Vadila	201	0.51%	0	New
Blank votes	1,197	2.99%		
Valid votes	39,767	86.91%		
Null votes	5,988	13.09%		
Seats			21	+2
Turnout	45,755	68.88%		
Abstentions	20,668	31.12%		
Registered voters	66,423			
Source: National Independent Election Commission (CENI)

=== Gorgol ===
Party	Votes	%	Seats	±
El Insaf	26,012	31.59%	8	-8
Union for Democracy and Progress (UDP)	13,930	16.92%	4	-5
El Karama	8,301	10.08%	3	+3
National Democratic Alliance (AND)	5,216	6.33%	2	New
National Rally for Reform and Development (Tewassoul)	4,402	5.35%	1	+1
Alliance for Justice and Democracy/Movement for Renewal (AJD/MR)	3,871	4.70%	1	+1
Burst of Youth for the Nation (PSJN)	3,866	4.69%	1	+1
Sawab	3,578	4.35%	1	New
Union of the Forces of Progress (UFP)	3,238	3.93%	1	+1
Republican Party for Democracy and Renewal (PRDR)	2,922	3.55%	1	New
Party of Conciliation and Prosperity (HIWAR)	1,747	2.12%	1	New
El Islah	1,634	1.98%	1	New
El Vadila	1,098	1.33%	0	=
People's Progressive Alliance (APP)	895	1.09%	0	=
Blank votes	1,635	1.99%		
Valid votes	82,345	79.46%		
Null votes	21,287	20.54%		
Seats			25	=
Turnout	103,632	76.49%		
Abstentions	31,859	23.51%		
Registered voters	135,491			
Source: National Independent Election Commission (CENI)

=== Guidimagha ===
Party	Votes	%	Seats	±
El Insaf	19,499	31.10%	8	-7
Union for Democracy and Progress (UDP)	18,997	30.30%	8	-3
Sawab	8,337	13.30%	3	+3
National Democratic Alliance (AND)	4,904	7.82%	2	New
National Rally for Reform and Development (Tewassoul)	4,739	7.56%	2	+2
El Vadila	2,194	3.50%	1	+1
People's Progressive Alliance (APP)	1,669	2.66%	1	+1
National Cohesion for Rights and the Construction of Generations (Ribat)	572	0.91%	0	New
Blank votes	1,787	2.85%		
Valid votes	62,698	83.85%		
Null votes	12,076	16.15%		
Seats			25	=
Turnout	74,774	81.43%		
Abstentions	17,052	18.57%		
Registered voters	91,826			
Source: National Independent Election Commission (CENI)

=== Hodh Ech Chargui ===
Party	Votes	%	Seats	±
El Insaf	37,661	40.43%	10	-7
Union for Democracy and Progress (UDP)	14,689	15.78%	4	+4
El Islah	12,974	13.93%	4	New
National Rally for Reform and Development (Tewassoul)	8,651	9.29%	2	-6
Mauritanian Party of Union and Change (HATEM)	4,883	5.24%	1	New
Sawab	1,845	1.98%	1	New
National Democratic Alliance (AND)	1,712	1.84%	1	+1
El Vadila	1,587	1.70%	1	+1
El Karama	1,381	1.48%	1	+1
People's Progressive Alliance (APP)	1,258	1.35%	0	New
El Ravah	1,117	1.20%	0	=
Union for Planning and Building (UPC)	945	1.01%	0	New
Burst of Youth for the Nation (PSJN)	729	0.78%	0	New
Blank votes	3,708	3.99%		
Valid votes	93,149	62.17%		
Null votes	56,686	37.83%		
Seats			25	=
Turnout	149,835	75.64%		
Abstentions	49,264	24.36%		
Registered voters	198,099			
Source: National Independent Election Commission (CENI)

=== Hodh El Gharbi ===
Party	Votes	%	Seats	±
El Insaf	36,197	40.52%	10	-3
National Rally for Reform and Development (Tewassoul)	19,417	21.74%	6	n/a
Mauritanian Party of Union and Change (HATEM)	8,982	10.05%	3	n/a
Union for Democracy and Progress (UDP)	6,832	7.65%	2	+2
El Islah	6,524	7.30%	2	+2
Party of the Mauritanian Masses (PMM)	4,189	4.69%	1	New
El Vadila	2,328	2.61%	1	New
People's Progressive Alliance (APP)	1,187	1.33%	0	New
Sawab	1,105	1.24%	0	=
Rally of Democratic Forces (RFD)	589	0.66%	0	New
National Cohesion for Rights and the Construction of Generations (Ribat)	460	0.51%	0	New
Blank votes	1,523	1.70%		
Valid votes	89,333	75.68%		
Null votes	28,703	24.32%		
Seats			25	=
Turnout	118,036	77.53%		
Abstentions	34,219	22.47%		
Registered voters	152,255			
Source: National Independent Election Commission (CENI)

=== Inchiri ===
Party	Votes	%	Seats	±
El Insaf	6,049	56.39%	6	-1
Union for Democracy and Progress (UDP)	1,440	13.42%	2	New
National Cohesion for Rights and the Construction of Generations (Ribat)	980	9.14%	1	New
National Rally for Reform and Development (Tewassoul)	487	4.54%	1	-1
Party of Conciliation and Prosperity (HIWAR)	484	4.51%	1	New
Union of the Forces of Progress, Rally of Democratic Forces and Alliance for Justice and Democracy/Movement for Renewal (UFP-RFD-AJD/MR)	374	3.49%	0	New
Sawab	339	3.16%	0	=
Mauritanian Party of Union and Change (HATEM)	309	2.88%	0	New
Blank votes	265	1.93%		
Valid votes	10,727	88.84%		
Null votes	1,348	11.16%		
Seats			11	=
Turnout	12,075	61.02%		
Abstentions	7,714	38.98%		
Registered voters	19,789			
Source: National Independent Election Commission (CENI)

=== Nouakchott ===
Party	Votes	%	Seats	±
El Insaf	72,217	35.41%	13	-6
National Rally for Reform and Development (Tewassoul)	38,059	18.66%	7	n/a
Republican Front for Unity and Democracy (FRUD)	12,247	6.01%	2	New
Sawab	9,741	4.78%	2	+2
National Democratic Alliance (AND)	9,016	4.42%	2	n/a
El Islah	5,904	2.89%	1	+1
Union for Planning and Building (UPC)	5,803	2.85%	1	New
Alliance for Justice and Democracy/Movement for Renewal (AJD/MR)	5,043	2.47%	1	+1
Union for Democracy and Progress (UDP)	4,684	2.02%	1	+1
National Cohesion for Rights and the Construction of Generations (Ribat)	4,118	2.02%	1	n/a
Union of the Forces of Progress (UFP)	3,926	1.93%	1	n/a
Rally of Democratic Forces (RFD)	3,551	1.74%	1	+1
People's Progressive Alliance (APP)	3,372	1.65%	1	n/a
Party of Unity and Development (PUD)	3,286	1.61%	1	New
El Karama	3,112	1.53%	1	+1
Mauritanian Party of Union and Change (HATEM)	2,906	1.42%	1	n/a
Party of the Mauritanian Masses (PMM)	2,747	1.35%	0	=
El Ravah	2,482	1.22%	0	New
Party of Construction and Progress (PCP)	2,180	1.07%	0	=
El Vadila	1,829	0.90%	0	=
Centre through Action for Progress (CAP)	1,588	0.78%	0	New
Blank votes	6,133	3.27%		
Valid votes	203,944	85.15%		
Null votes	35,570	14.85%		
Seats			37	=
Turnout	239,514	62.75%		
Abstentions	142,54	37.25%		
Registered voters	381,668			
Source: National Independent Election Commission (CENI)

=== Tagant ===
Party	Votes	%	Seats	±
El Insaf	23,267	65.86%	10	+2
El Ravah	4,396	12.44%	2	New
National Rally for Reform and Development (Tewassoul)	3,272	9.26%	2	=
Union for Democracy and Progress (UDP)	2,349	6.65%	1	-3
National Democratic Alliance (AND)	861	2.49%	0	n/a
People's Progressive Alliance (APP)	690	1.95%	0	n/a
Blank votes	473	1.35%		
Valid votes	35,328	85.89%		
Null votes	5,802	14.11%		
Seats			15	=
Turnout	41,130	73.66%		
Abstentions	14,706	26.34%		
Registered voters	55,836			
Source: National Independent Election Commission (CENI)

=== Tiris Zemmour ===
Party	Votes	%	Seats	±
El Insaf	5,673	31.41%	4	-2
Union for Democracy and Progress (UDP)	4,284	23.72%	3	New
National Rally for Reform and Development and Sawab (Tewassoul-Sawab)	2,311	12.79%	2	n/a
El Islah	2,129	11.79%	1	+1
Republican Front for Unity and Democracy and People's Progressive Alliance (FRUD-APP)	1,949	10.79%	1	n/a
Union of the Forces of Progress and Alliance for Justice and Democracy/Movement for Renewal (UFP-AJD/MR)	653	3.61%	0	n/a
El Vadila	394	2.18%	0	New
National Cohesion for Rights and the Construction of Generations (Ribat)	282	1.56%	0	n/a
Blank votes	389	2.15%		
Valid votes	18,064	89.76%		
Null votes	2,061	10.24%		
Seats			11	=
Turnout	20,125	71.41%		
Abstentions	8,057	28.59%		
Registered voters	28,182			
Source: National Independent Election Commission (CENI)

=== Trarza ===
Party	Votes	%	Seats	±
El Insaf	84,360	60.32%	15	-2
National Rally for Reform and Development (Tewassoul)	18,905	13.52%	3	-5
Sawab	8,518	6.09%	2	+2
Centre through Action for Progress (CAP)	6,233	4.46%	1	New
El Islah	5,609	4.01%	1	New
Rally of Democratic Forces (RFD)	5,152	3.68%	1	+1
Party of the Mauritanian Masses (PMM)	3,676	2.63%	1	New
National Democratic Alliance (AND)	2,709	1.94%	1	New
People's Progressive Alliance (APP)	1,167	0.83%	0	=
Blank votes	3,533	2.52%		
Valid votes	139,862	87.78%		
Null votes	19,479	12.22%		
Seats			25	=
Turnout	159,341	67.31%		
Abstentions	77,398	32.69%		
Registered voters	236,739			
Source: National Independent Election Commission (CENI)
