= Coordination of Parties of the Majority =

Ruling political coalition in Mauritania

Coordination of Parties of the Majority منسقية أحزاب الأغلبية Coordination des partis de la majorité
- Leader: Mohamed Ould Ghazouani
- Founded: 20 April 2021
- Headquarters: Nouakchott
- Ideology: Populism; Liberal conservatism
- Political position: Centre to right-wing
- Parliamentary group: El Insaf group; Trust group; Justice group; UDP group
- Members: See composition
- National Assembly: 146 / 176
- Regional councils: 211 / 285

The Coordination of Parties of the Majority (Arabic: منسقية أحزاب الأغلبية, French: Coordination des partis de la majorité) is an alliance of parties supporting the President of Mauritania Mohamed Ould Ghazouani. It was founded on 20 April 2021.

== History ==
The alliance was founded on 20 April 2021 by 13 parliamentary and extra-parliamentary political parties that form part of the presidential majority supporting president Mohamed Ould Ghazouani. The parties expressed their "strong support for the program of President Mohamed Ould Cheikh El Ghazouani and his government" and pledged "to dedicate their efforts to work on implementing" Ghazouani's election program. The coordination "works to unify visions on various national and political issues, according to a clear and consistent mechanism that respects the controls of democracy, political partnership, and the privacy of each of the parties" members of the coalition. The coordination also criticized the legacy of Mauritanian ex-president Mohamed Ould Abdel Aziz and Aziz's alleged "desperate attempt to divert attention from the accusations leveled against him" and his "politicization of a judicial case".

On 2 August 2022, the coalition held a meeting to evaluate the framework of the coordination, commemorate the third anniversary of the investiture of Ghazouani and exchange views on the organization of the upcoming elections.

On 5 October 2022, Union for Planning and Construction (UPC), left the coalition in order to form a coalition with four political movements that weren't allowed to be registered as political parties, forming the State of Justice Coalition, which would run under the UPC party label.

== Composition ==
| Party | Leader | Parliamentary group | Deputies | RCs | Government |
|---|---|---|---|---|---|
| Equity Party (El Insaf) | Mohamed Melainine Ould Eyih | El Insaf | 107 / 176 | 124 / 285 | Government |
| Union for Democracy and Progress (UDP) | Naha Mint Mouknass | UDP | 10 / 176 | 28 / 285 | Support |
| National Democratic Alliance (AND) | Yacoub Ould Moine | Justice | 6 / 176 | 11 / 285 | Government |
| Reform Party (El Islah) | Mohamed Ould Talebna | Trust | 6 / 176 | 15 / 285 | Government |
| Dignity Party (El Karama) | Cheikhna Ould Hajbou | Trust | 5 / 176 | 10 / 285 | Support |
| Nation's Call (Nida El Watan) | Daoud Ould Ahmed Aicha | Justice | 5 / 176 | 4 / 285 | Support |
| Mauritanian Party of Union and Change (HATEM) | Saleh Ould Hanenna | Trust | 3 / 176 | 7 / 285 | Support |
| Party of Conciliation and Prosperity (HIWAR) | Valle Mint Miny | El Insaf | 3 / 176 | 4 / 285 | Support |
| Party of the Mauritanian Masses (PMM) | El Khalil Ould Ennahoui | Trust | 1 / 176 | 2 / 285 | Support |
| Party of Unity and Development (PUD) | Mohamed Ould Bari | — | 0 / 176 | 1 / 285 | Extra-parliamentary |
| Burst of Youth for the Nation (PSJN) | Lalla Mint Cheriva | — | 0 / 176 | 1 / 285 | Extra-parliamentary |
| Welfare Party (El Ravah) | Mohamed Ould Vall | — | 0 / 176 | 2 / 285 | Extra-parliamentary |
| Party of Construction and Progress (PCP) | Mohamed Ould Barbas | — | 0 / 176 | 2 / 285 | Extra-parliamentary |

== See also ==
- First government of Mohamed Ould Bilal
- Second government of Mohamed Ould Bilal
- Third government of Mohamed Ould Bilal
- State of Justice Coalition
- Hope Mauritania
