= 2024 Mauritanian presidential election =

- 29 June 2024
- Registered: 1,939,342 (▲25.59%)
- Turnout: 55.39% (▼7.24pp)
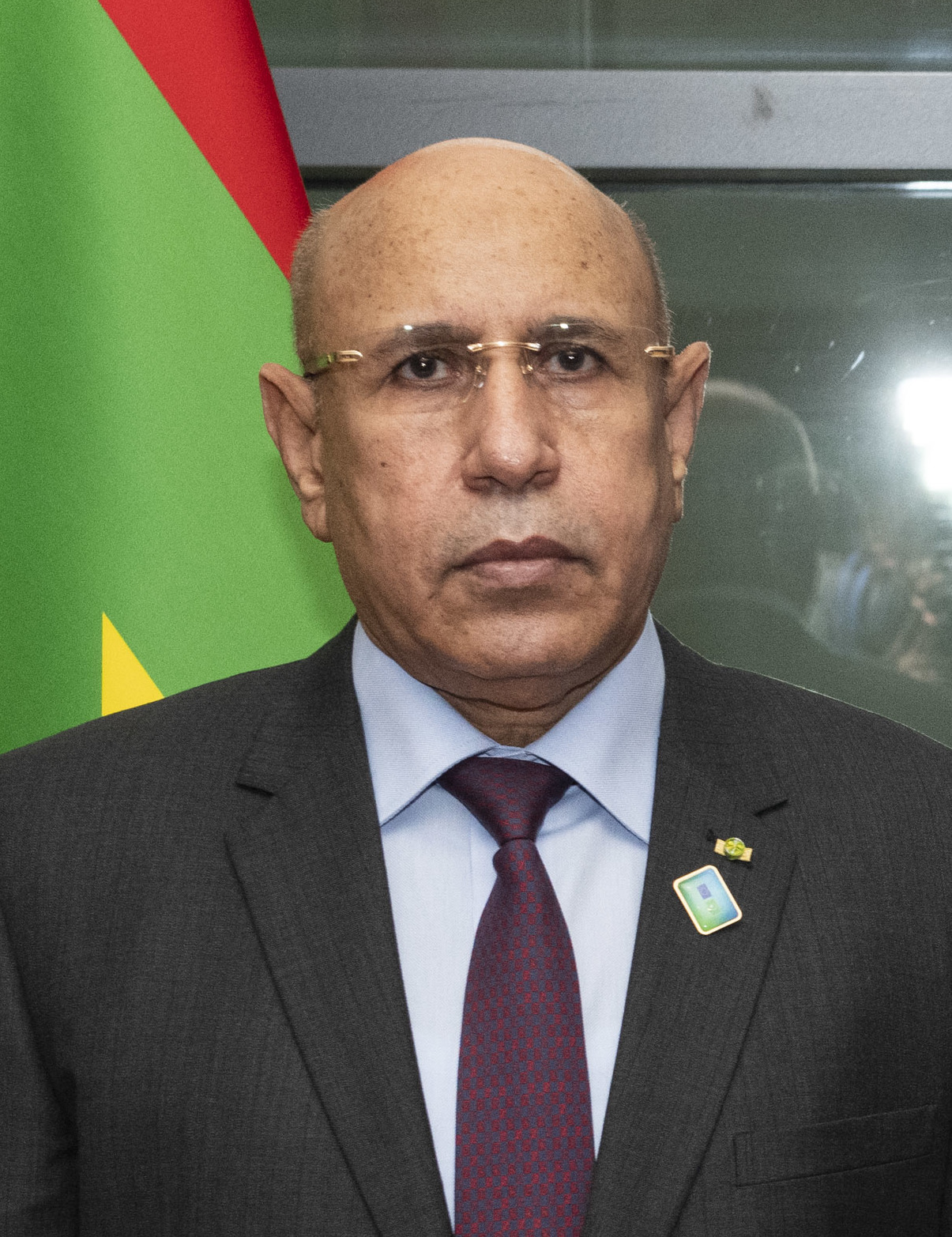

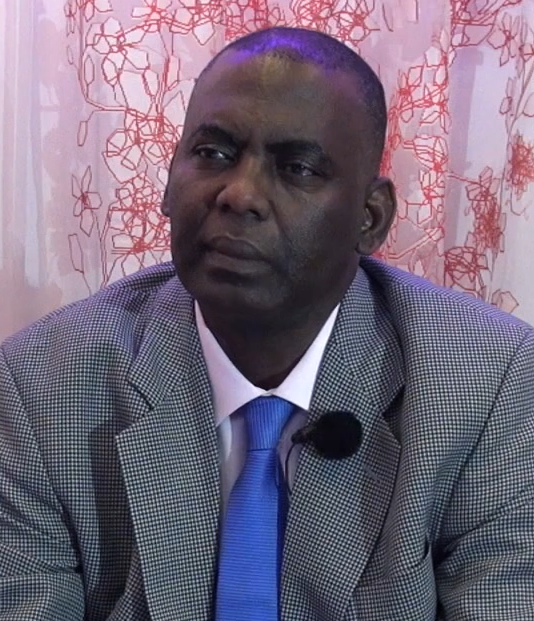

Candidate	Mohamed Ould Ghazouani	Biram Dah Abeid	Hamadi Ould Sid'El Moctar
Party	El Insaf	RAG	Tewassoul
Alliance	CPM	Sawab–RAG
Popular vote	554,959	218,546	126,187
Percentage	56.12%	22.10%	12.76%
President before election
Mohamed Ould Ghazouani
El Insaf
Elected President
Mohamed Ould Ghazouani
El Insaf

Presidential elections were held in Mauritania on 29 June 2024. Incumbent Mohamed Ould Ghazouani won re-election for his second and final term as president, increasing his vote share by four points.

== Electoral system ==
Under Article 26 of the constitution the president is elected for a five-year term using the two-round system. If no candidate receives an absolute majority of the vote in the first round, a second round is held two weeks later between the two candidates who received the most votes.

Candidacy is restricted to citizens by birth aged between 40 and 75 (on the day of the first round) who have not had their civil and political rights removed. Article 23 also stipulates that the president has to be a Muslim. Article 28 establishes a term limit of two mandates, allowing the president to only be re-elected once.

The election of a new president is required to take place between 30 and 45 days before the expiration of the term of the incumbent president.

For this election, campaigning was held from 14 June to 27 June. Polling stations were open from 07:00 to 19:00 local time (GMT).

== Candidates ==
=== Presented ===
#	Candidate	Party	Experience	Candidacy dates	Ref.
1	Mohamed; Ould; Cheikh; Ould; Ghazouani	Equity Party	President of Mauritania (2019–present); Minister of Defense (2018–2019); Chief of Army Staff (2008–2018)	Declared: 24 April 2024 Deposited: 26 April 2024	
2	Mohamed Lemine; Ould; El Mourteji; Ould; El Wavi	Independent	2019 presidential candidate Economist	Declared: 14 January 2024 Deposited: 3 May 2024	
3	Hamadi; Ould; Sid'El Moctar; Ould; Mohamed Abdi	Tewassoul	Deputy for Kiffa (2013–2023); President of Tewassoul (2023–present)	Declared: 2 May 2024 Deposited: 8 May 2024	
4	Outouma; Antoine; Souleimane; Soumaré	Independent	Neurosurgeon	Declared: 13 May 2024 Deposited: 13 May 2024	
5	Mamadou; Bocar; Ba	AJD/MR	Deputy for Nouakchott (2013–2018); President of the AJD/MR (2024–present)	Declared: 20 January 2024 Deposited: 14 May 2024	
6	El Id; Ould; Mohameden; Ould; M'Bareck	FRUD	National list deputy (2023–present); Deputy for Nouakchott (2018–2023)	Declared: 2 March 2024 Deposited: 15 May 2024	
7	Biram; Ould; Dah; Ould; Abeid	Sawab–RAG	National list deputy (2018–present); 2014 and 2019 presidential candidate	Declared: 24 April 2024 Deposited: 16 May 2024	

=== Disqualified ===
- Mohamed Ould Abdel Aziz, former general, President of Mauritania from 2008 until 2019. He is currently serving a sentence of five years in jail, with him being authorized by the judiciary to leave jail in order to present his candidacy file. His candidacy was later rejected by the Constitutional Council, which considered it incomplete, despite Ould Abdel Aziz delivering his documentation. His political movement claimed the Constitutional Council "suffered a coup".

=== Declared ===
- Ahmed Ould Samba Ould Abdallahi, politician from the People's Progressive Alliance until 2024.
- Mohamed Ould Cheikh, journalist and political analyst.
- Ahmed Ould Haroun Ould Cheikh Sidiya, political activist and leader of the 8 September Current.
- Hamidine Moctar Kane, economist.

=== Withdrew ===
- Noureddine Ould Mohamedou, computer engineer and politician.

== Endorsements ==
Mohamed Ould Ghazouani (El Insaf)

Individuals

- Mohamed Ould Bouamatou, businessman
- Ahmed Ould Daddah, leader of the Rally of Democratic Forces
- Mohamed Jemil Ould Mansour, leader of the Front for Citizenship and Equality
- Abderrahmane Ould Mini, former deputy for the Rally of Democratic Forces

Organisations

- Coordination of Parties of the Majority
  - El Islah
  - Mauritanian Party of Union and Change
- People's Progressive Alliance
- Front for Citizenship and Equality
- League of Former Members of Parliament
Biram Dah Abeid (Democratic Alternation Pole)

Organisations

- Coalition Living Together
- Progressive Forces of Change
El Id Ould Mohameden (Hope Mauritania)

Organisations

- Union of the Forces of Progress
- Rally of Democratic Forces (dissident split led by Nana Mint Cheikhna and Mokhtar Ould Cheikh)
Outoma Soumaré (Independent)

Organisations

- Movement for Emancipation and Development

== Campaign ==
Ghazouani campaigned in part on a security platform, while his opponents accused his government of corruption and clientelism, with Dah Abeid denouncing what he called “a catastrophic management of the state”. Other issues during the election included unemployment, poverty and access to utilities such as water and electricity. Observers from the African Union and the United States monitored the vote.

== Results ==
Candidate	Party	Votes	%
Mohamed Ould Ghazouani	El Insaf	554,956	56.12
Biram Dah Abeid	Democratic Alternation Pole	218,546	22.10
Hamadi Sid’El Moctar Mohamed Abdi	National Rally for Reform and Development	126,340	12.78
El Id Mohameden M’Bareck	Republican Front for Unity and Democracy	35,288	3.57
Mamadou Bocar Ba	Alliance for Justice and Democracy/Movement for Renewal	23,617	2.39
Outouma Antoine Souleimane Soumaré	Independent	20,360	2.06
Mohamed Lemine El Mourteji El Wavi	Independent	9,722	0.98
Total		988,829	100.00
Valid votes		988,829	92.05
Invalid votes		53,787	5.01
Blank votes		31,608	2.94
Total votes		1,074,224	100.00
Registered voters/turnout		1,939,344	55.39
Source: National Independent Election Commission

=== Turnout ===
Turnout by wilaya
Wilaya	Turnout		Abstention		Registered
Wilaya	Voters	%	Absent	%	Registered
Adrar	29,194	52.29%	26,636	47.71%	55,830
Assaba	89,804	53.08%	79,373	46.92%	169,177
Brakna	111,786	60.09%	74,233	39.91%	186,019
Dakhlet Nouadhibou	50,503	60.22%	33,361	39.78%	83,864
Gorgol	86,939	62.05%	53,165	37.95%	140,104
Guidimagha	59,261	63.03%	34,764	36.97%	94,025
Hodh Ech Chargui	107,485	52.64%	96,708	47.36%	204,193
Hodh El Gharbi	80,615	51.88%	74,787	48.12%	155,402
Inchiri	8,224	43.31%	10,764	56.69%	18,988
Nouakchott-Nord	65,429	46.78%	74,445	53.22%	139,874
Nouakchott-Ouest	76,158	47.58%	83,908	52.42%	160,066
Nouakchott-Sud	94,624	58.90%	66,022	41.10%	160,646
Tagant	31,155	55.47%	25,014	44.53%	56,169
Tiris Zemmour	18,547	57.19%	13,884	42.81%	32,431
Trarza	149,412	59.01%	103,771	40.99%	253,183
Diaspora	15,074	51.32%	14,297	48.68%	29,371
Total	1,073,553	55.36%	865,789	44.64%	1,939,342
Source: National Independent Election Commission

Turnout by moughataa
Moughataa	Turnout		Abstention		Registered
Moughataa	Voters	%	Absent	%	Registered
Adel Begrou	12,364	57.45%	9,158	42.55%	21,522
Aïoun	17,480	45.64%	20,822	54.36%	38,302
Akjoujt	5,005	56.07%	3,922	43.93%	8,927
Aleg	22,422	56.83%	17,030	43.17%	39,452
Amourj	11,963	50.44%	11,753	49.56%	23,716
Aoujeft	7,983	52.56%	7,204	47.44%	15,187
Arafat	41,829	54.83%	34,466	45.17%	76,295
Atar	16,828	56.35%	13,038	43.65%	29,866
Bababé	12,964	63.85%	7,339	36.15%	20,303
Barkéol	18,208	50.88%	17,580	49.12%	35,788
Bassiknou	13,874	53.35%	12,130	46.65%	26,004
Bénichab	3,219	31.99%	6,842	68.01%	10,061
Bir Moghrein	1,809	46.55%	2,077	53.45%	3,886
Boghé	23,669	65.19%	12,640	34.81%	36,309
Boumdeid	8,936	72.43%	3,402	27.57%	12,338
Boutilimit	38,898	69.25%	17,271	30.75%	56,169
Chami	4,555	40.78%	6,614	59.22%	11,169
Chinguetti	2,607	34.04%	5,052	65.96%	7,659
Dar Naïm	19,912	50.86%	19,241	49.14%	39,153
Djiguenni	15,291	50.62%	14,917	49.38%	30,208
El Mina	28,247	63.43%	16,289	36.57%	44,536
F'Déirick	2,337	47.95%	2,537	52.05%	4,874
Ghabou	15,307	65.42%	8,091	34.58%	23,398
Guerou	17,155	58.33%	12,257	41.67%	29,412
Kaédi	26,747	67.89%	12,653	32.11%	39,400
Kankoussa	14,210	49.63%	14,424	50.37%	28,634
Keur Macène	15,427	52.99%	13,688	47.01%	29,115
Kiffa	31,261	49.62%	31,744	50.38%	63,005
Koubenni	21,867	52.52%	19,766	47.48%	41,633
Ksar	25,495	47.34%	28,363	52.66%	53,858
Lexeiba	10,844	64.36%	6,005	35.64%	16,849
M'Bagne	13,962	63.11%	8,163	36.89%	22,125
M'Bout	22,653	55.86%	17,900	44.14%	40,553
Maghama	16,029	68.17%	7,486	31.83%	23,515
Magta Lahjar	25,178	58.06%	18,188	41.94%	43,366
Male	13,591	55.56%	10,873	44.44%	24,464
Méderdra	21,584	64.63%	11,812	35.37%	33,396
Monguel	10,666	53.90%	9,121	46.10%	19,787
Moudjéria	15,208	53.40%	13,272	46.60%	28,480
N'Beiket Lahwach	5,257	62.61%	3,140	37.39%	8,397
Néma	24,490	53.09%	21,635	46.91%	46,125
Nouadhibou	45,948	63.21%	26,747	36.79%	72,695
Ouad Naga	22,870	48.69%	24,102	51.31%	46,972
Ouadane	1,776	56.96%	1,342	43.04%	3,118
Oualata	3,614	42.26%	4,938	57.74%	8,552
Ould Yengé	16,447	59.43%	11,228	40.57%	27,675
R'Kiz	15,338	51.84%	14,251	48.16%	29,589
Riyad	24,548	61.66%	15,267	38.34%	39,815
Rosso	21,308	61.74%	13,202	38.26%	34,510
Sebkha	21,820	56.14%	14,468	43.86%	36,288
Sélibaby	17,523	63.95%	9,880	36.05%	27,403
Tamchekett	11,631	56.69%	8,887	43.31%	20,518
Tékane	14,043	59.93%	9,389	40.07%	23,432
Tevragh Zeina	28,843	41.25%	41,077	58.75%	69,920
Teyarett	15,621	38.70%	24,746	61.30%	40,367
Tichitt	2,255	48.20%	2,423	51.80%	4,678
Tidjikja	13,646	59.30%	9,365	40.70%	23,011
Timbédra	20,632	52.01%	19,037	47.99%	39,669
Tintane	21,010	50.53%	20,573	49.47%	41,583
Touil	8,627	64.54%	4,739	35.46%	13,366
Toujounine	29,896	49.53%	30,458	50.47%	60,354
Wompou	9,984	64.21%	5,565	35.79%	15,549
Zouérate	14,401	60.84%	9,270	39.16%	23,671
Africa	4,927	51.00%	4,733	49.00%	9,660
America	2,152	47.46%	2,382	52.54%	4,534
Asia	3,802	50.76%	3,688	49.24%	7,490
Europe	4,193	54.55%	3,494	45.45%	7,687
Total	1,073,553	55.36%	865,789	44.64%	1,939,344
Source: National Independent Election Commission

=== Results by wilaya ===
Results by wilaya
Wilaya	Ghazouani		Abeid		Sid'El Moctar		Mohameden		Ba		Soumaré		El Wavi		Neutral		Null	
Wilaya	Votes	%	Votes	%	Votes	%	Votes	%	Votes	%	Votes	%	Votes	%	Votes	%	Votes	%
Adrar	20,193	73.97%	2,373	8.69%	3,495	12.80%	590	2.16%	134	0.49%	263	0.96%	251	0.92%	648		1,247	
Assaba	53,843	64.58%	14,677	17.60%	11,319	13.58%	1,844	2.21%	420	0.50%	304	0.36%	964	1.16%	2,269		4,164	
Brakna	59,853	58.00%	19,338	18.74%	9,326	9.04%	7,016	6.80%	5,724	5.55%	1,029	1.00%	914	0.89%	2,672		5,914	
Dakhlet Nouadhibou	16,454	35.89%	18,839	41.09%	5,853	12.76%	2,202	4.80%	1,436	3.13%	804	1.75%	264	0.58%	2,042		2,609	
Gorgol	38,056	48.17%	23,667	29.96%	3,296	4.17%	5,773	7.31%	6,076	7.69%	1,391	1.76%	749	0.95%	3,276		4,655	
Guidimagha	22,037	41.17%	18,621	34.79%	3,950	7.38%	1,282	2.40%	1,923	3.59%	5,224	9.76%	501	0.94%	2,766		2,973	
Hodh Ech Chargui	78,650	78.50%	6,479	6.47%	11,359	11.34%	1,038	1.04%	283	0.28%	386	0.39%	1,999	2.00%	1,375		5,916	
Hodh El Gharbi	53,390	70.60%	5,763	7.62%	13,692	18.10%	1,131	1.50%	330	0.44%	264	0.35%	1,057	1.40%	1,069		3,919	
Inchiri	4,483	60.57%	1,334	18.02%	955	12.90%	277	3.74%	177	2.39%	110	1.49%	65	0.88%	295		528	
Nouakchott-Nord	22,678	38.53%	17,265	29.34%	14,700	24.98%	2,047	3.48%	705	1.20%	869	1.48%	588	1.00%	2,562		4,015	
Nouakchott-Ouest	26,151	38.08%	24,466	35.62%	9,184	13.37%	2,258	3.29%	1,878	2.73%	4,241	6.18%	499	0.73%	3,720		3,761	
Nouakchott-Sud	28,897	33.94%	34,366	40.36%	12,923	15.18%	3,893	4.57%	2,935	3.45%	1,564	1.84%	562	0.66%	4,245		5,239	
Tagant	23,258	78.33%	1,747	5.88%	3,158	10.64%	1,020	3.44%	58	0.20%	121	0.41%	331	1.11%	346		1,116	
Tiris Zemmour	7,781	45.34%	4,562	26.58%	3,338	19.45%	794	4.63%	392	2.28%	145	0.84%	150	0.87%	669		716	
Trarza	94,682	67.82%	20,836	14.92%	16,760	12.01%	3,631	2.60%	630	0.45%	2,139	1.53%	927	0.66%	3,407		6,400	
Diaspora	4,562	32.09%	4,212	29.63%	2,868	20.17%	496	3.49%	517	3.64%	1,506	10.59%	56	0.39%	249		608	
Total	554,494	56.11%	218,427	22.10%	126,153	12.77%	35,278	3.57%	23,608	2.39%	20,360	2.06%	9,871	1.00%	31,588	2.94%	53,774	5.01%
Source: National Independent Election Commission

=== Results by moughataa ===
Results by moughataa
Moughataa	Ghazouani		Abeid		Sid'El Moctar		Mohameden		Ba		Soumaré		El Wavi		Neutral		Null	
Moughataa	Votes	%	Votes	%	Votes	%	Votes	%	Votes	%	Votes	%	Votes	%	Votes	%	Votes	%
Adel Begrou	9,757	85.69%	755	6.63%	562	4.94%	79	0.69%	24	0.21%	24	0.21%	185	1.62%	187		791	
Aïoun	12,049	72.85%	1,199	7.25%	2,516	15.21%	438	2.65%	47	0.28%	54	0.33%	236	1.43%	205		736	
Akjoujt	2,930	64.55%	605	13.33%	590	13.00%	181	3.99%	144	3.17%	53	1.17%	36	0.79%	132		334	
Aleg	14,844	71.82%	2,419	11.70%	2,807	13.58%	267	1.29%	64	0.31%	94	0.45%	172	0.83%	404		1,351	
Amourj	8,537	78.62%	1,063	9.79%	776	7.15%	144	1.33%	46	0.42%	39	0.36%	254	2.34%	253		851	
Aoujeft	6,279	81.59%	250	3.25%	830	10.78%	214	2.78%	11	0.14%	43	0.56%	69	0.90%	85		202	
Arafat	16,351	42.91%	9,775	25.65%	9,393	24.65%	1,161	3.05%	653	1.71%	468	1.23%	305	0.80%	1,442		2,281	
Atar	10,578	68.55%	1,945	12.60%	2,154	13.96%	298	1.93%	117	0.76%	192	1.24%	147	0.95%	500		897	
Bababé	5,667	47.34%	3,504	29.27%	148	1.24%	789	6.59%	1,696	14.17%	101	0.84%	67	0.56%	356		636	
Barkéol	8,147	50.09%	5,494	33.78%	1,176	7.23%	1,064	6.54%	138	0.85%	47	0.29%	199	1.22%	923		1,020	
Bassiknou	10,396	80.33%	1,018	7.87%	1,119	8.65%	109	0.84%	51	0.39%	33	0.25%	216	1.67%	195		737	
Bénichab	1,553	54.26%	729	25.47%	365	12.75%	96	3.35%	33	1.15%	57	1.99%	29	1.01%	163		194	
Bir Moghrein	1,042	69.75%	223	14.93%	174	11.65%	24	1.61%	10	0.67%	9	0.60%	12	0.80%	188		127	
Boghé	8,557	40.45%	7,220	34.13%	718	3.39%	1,756	8.30%	2,168	10.25%	624	2.95%	114	0.54%	1,006		1,506	
Boumdeid	8,097	92.65%	184	2.11%	368	4.21%	34	0.39%	7	0.08%	9	0.10%	40	0.46%	63		134	
Boutilimit	31,250	83.63%	1,403	3.75%	3,952	10.58%	271	0.73%	48	0.13%	236	0.63%	206	0.55%	462		1,070	
Chami	2,594	63.11%	730	17.76%	631	15.35%	79	1.92%	25	0.61%	21	0.51%	30	0.73%	193		252	
Chinguetti	1,872	75.54%	153	6.17%	379	15.29%	28	1.13%	6	0.24%	20	0.81%	20	0.81%	31		98	
Dar Naïm	6,171	35.29%	6,582	37.64%	3,135	17.93%	776	4.44%	380	2.17%	300	1.72%	144	0.82%	768		1,656	
Djiguenni	10,676	74.52%	721	5.03%	2,211	15.43%	257	1.79%	45	0.31%	171	1.19%	245	1.71%	169		796	
El Mina	7,188	28.72%	13,137	52.49%	1,429	5.71%	1,280	5.11%	1,122	4.48%	735	2.94%	139	0.56%	1,493		1,724	
F'Déirick	1,179	56.33%	348	16.63%	458	21.88%	52	2.48%	10	0.48%	21	1.00%	25	1.19%	84		160	
Ghabou	5,959	43.28%	4,788	34.78%	674	4.90%	394	2.86%	565	4.10%	1,274	9.25%	113	0.82%	792		748	
Guerou	9,122	56.31%	2,645	16.33%	3,926	24.23%	236	1.46%	48	0.30%	54	0.33%	170	1.05%	329		625	
Kaédi	10,014	41.22%	8,683	35.74%	1,231	5.07%	1,183	4.87%	2,615	10.76%	419	1.72%	150	0.62%	980		1,472	
Kankoussa	8,054	63.08%	2,981	23.35%	1,130	8.85%	191	1.50%	105	0.82%	43	0.34%	263	2.06%	562		881	
Keur Macène	8,767	61.73%	1,975	13.91%	1,807	12.72%	1,230	8.66%	47	0.33%	268	1.89%	109	0.77%	438		786	
Kiffa	20,398	69.46%	3,377	11.50%	4,708	16.03%	315	1.07%	123	0.42%	151	0.51%	295	1.00%	389		1,505	
Koubenni	13,224	65.31%	2,185	10.79%	3,959	19.55%	340	1.68%	137	0.68%	82	0.40%	320	1.58%	398		1,222	
Ksar	11,248	49.08%	5,889	25.70%	4,033	17.60%	641	2.80%	229	1.00%	685	2.99%	191	0.83%	1,318		1,261	
Lexeiba	5,291	52.47%	1,914	18.98%	901	8.94%	1,228	12.18%	631	6.26%	31	0.31%	87	0.86%	280		481	
M'Bagne	4,852	37.39%	2,209	17.03%	357	2.75%	3,646	28.10%	1,716	13.23%	115	0.89%	80	0.62%	337		650	
M'Bout	10,866	53.59%	7,240	35.71%	514	2.53%	718	3.54%	346	1.71%	329	1.62%	264	1.30%	1,170		1,206	
Maghama	6,572	45.21%	2,661	18.31%	454	3.12%	1,904	13.10%	2,209	15.20%	597	4.11%	138	0.95%	417		1,077	
Magta Lahjar	16,856	71.08%	2,562	10.80%	3,556	14.99%	288	1.21%	46	0.19%	67	0.28%	340	1.43%	358		1,105	
Male	9,077	71.39%	1,424	11.20%	1,740	13.69%	270	2.12%	34	0.27%	28	0.22%	141	1.11%	211		666	
Méderdra	14,891	74.10%	1,996	9.93%	2,356	11.72%	334	1.66%	38	0.19%	325	1.62%	157	0.78%	471		1,016	
Monguel	5,313	54.11%	3,169	32.28%	196	2.00%	740	7.54%	275	2.80%	15	0.15%	110	1.12%	429		419	
Moudjéria	11,471	79.38%	938	6.49%	1,331	9.21%	442	3.06%	33	0.23%	42	0.29%	194	1.34%	173		584	
N'Beiket Lahwach	4,628	90.57%	83	1.62%	290	5.68%	17	0.33%	4	0.08%	2	0.04%	86	1.68%	21		126	
Néma	16,884	73.44%	1,643	7.15%	3,529	15.35%	173	0.75%	61	0.27%	73	0.32%	628	2.73%	340		1,159	
Nouadhibou	13,860	33.20%	18,109	43.38%	5,222	12.51%	2,123	5.09%	1,411	3.38%	783	1.88%	234	0.56%	1,849		2,357	
Ouad Naga	15,016	70.56%	1,190	5.59%	4,505	21.17%	246	1.16%	20	0.09%	162	0.76%	143	0.67%	544		1,044	
Ouadane	1,464	86.42%	25	1.48%	132	7.79%	50	2.95%	0	0.00%	8	0.47%	15	0.89%	32		50	
Oualata	2,981	86.13%	91	2.63%	311	8.99%	20	0.58%	6	0.17%	2	0.06%	50	1.44%	31		122	
Ould Yengé	7,394	49.10%	4,243	28.18%	1,157	7.68%	253	1.68%	335	2.22%	1,529	10.15%	147	0.98%	669		720	
R'Kiz	8,558	59.60%	1,993	13.88%	3,032	21.12%	396	2.76%	39	0.27%	239	1.66%	101	0.70%	272		708	
Riyad	5,358	24.35%	11,454	52.05%	2,101	9.55%	1,452	6.60%	1,160	5.27%	361	1.64%	118	0.54%	1,310		1,234	
Rosso	8,984	46.22%	8,247	42.43%	705	3.63%	446	2.29%	311	1.60%	611	3.14%	132	0.68%	806		1,066	
Sebkha	3,465	17.72%	10,979	56.14%	350	1.79%	807	4.13%	1,341	6.86%	2,555	13.07%	59	0.30%	1,055		1,209	
Sélibaby	4,592	29.49%	6,797	43.65%	1,571	10.09%	399	2.56%	556	3.57%	1,522	9.78%	149	0.96%	930		1,023	
Tamchekett	9,043	82.29%	870	7.92%	822	7.48%	57	0.52%	28	0.25%	25	0.23%	144	1.31%	146		496	
Tékane	7,237	56.08%	4,051	31.39%	406	3.15%	706	5.47%	128	0.99%	298	2.31%	79	0.61%	424		714	
Tevragh Zeina	11,438	43.65%	7,598	28.99%	4,801	18.32%	810	3.09%	308	1.18%	1,001	3.82%	249	0.95%	1,347		1,291	
Teyarett	6,130	42.89%	3,669	25.67%	3,325	23.26%	607	4.25%	144	1.01%	296	2.07%	122	0.85%	594		734	
Tichitt	1,917	89.12%	18	0.84%	189	8.79%	11	0.51%	1	0.05%	7	0.33%	8	0.37%	19		85	
Tidjikja	9,827	75.31%	790	6.05%	1,640	12.57%	568	4.35%	24	0.18%	73	0.56%	126	0.97%	155		443	
Timbédra	14,791	77.36%	1,105	5.78%	2,561	13.40%	239	1.25%	46	0.24%	42	0.22%	335	1.75%	179		1,334	
Tintane	13,535	67.53%	874	4.36%	5,140	25.65%	125	0.62%	74	0.37%	75	0.37%	219	1.09%	153		815	
Touil	5,539	70.92%	635	8.13%	1,255	16.07%	171	2.19%	44	0.56%	28	0.36%	138	1.77%	167		650	
Toujounine	10,377	38.33%	7,014	25.91%	8,240	30.44%	664	2.45%	181	0.67%	273	1.01%	322	1.19%	1,200		1,625	
Wompou	4,092	44.83%	2,793	30.60%	548	6.00%	236	2.59%	467	5.12%	899	9.85%	92	1.01%	375		482	
Zouérate	5,560	40.96%	3,991	29.40%	2,706	19.93%	718	5.29%	372	2.74%	115	0.85%	113	0.83%	397		429	
Africa	1,301	27.88%	1,727	37.00%	1,427	30.58%	144	3.09%	13	0.28%	26	0.56%	29	0.62%	83		177	
America	425	21.23%	785	39.21%	267	13.34%	162	8.09%	215	10.74%	141	7.04%	7	0.35%	41		109	
Asia	2,285	62.08%	101	2.74%	1,125	30.56%	86	2.34%	7	0.19%	60	1.63%	17	0.46%	26		95	
Europe	551	14.25%	1,599	41.35%	49	1.27%	104	2.69%	282	7.29%	1,279	33.07%	3	0.08%	99		227	
Total	554,494	56.11%	218,427	22.10%	126,153	12.77%	35,278	3.57%	23,608	2.39%	20,360	2.06%	9,871	1.00%	31,588	2.94%	53,774	5.01%
Source: National Independent Election Commission

== Aftermath ==
After the preliminary results showed Ghazouani leading in the election, Dah Abeid said that he would not recognize the results of “Ghazouani’s Ceni” and would hold "peaceful" demonstrations in the streets. A spokesperson for the electoral commission said it had recorded no anomalies or complaints regarding the vote.

On 2 July, three people were killed during clashes between the security forces and protesters demonstrating against the election results in Kaédi, which led authorities to block mobile internet services nationwide. Protests were also held in Nouadhibou, Rosso, Zouérate and Boghé. On July 4, the Constitutional Council confirmed Ghazouani as the winner of the election.
