= Parliamentary group (Mauritania) =

Parliamentary groups are formed by deputies in the National Assembly of Mauritania through the grouping of at least seven deputies sharing similar political opinions. Deputies not belonging to any group sit automatically as non-attached members. They are regulated in the fifth chapter of the Rules of the National Assembly.

== Current parliamentary groups ==
Composition of the National Assembly as of 26 June 2023
Parliamentary group	Members	President
El Insaf: • El Insaf (107); • HIWAR (3)	110	Mohamed Lemine Hamoud Amar
Trust: • El Islah (6); • El Karama (5); • HATEM (3); • El Vadila (2); • PMM (1)	17	Saleh Ould Hanenna
Tewassoul	11	Yahya Aboubecrine Sid Elemine
Justice: • AND (6); • Nida El Watan (5)	11	Daoud Abdallahi Ahmed Aicha
Union for Democracy and Progress	10	Naha Hamdi Mouknass
Republican Front for Unity and Democracy	7	Kadiata Malick Diallo
Non-attached members (Note: Sawab+ and AJD/MR+ are expected to eventually form their own parliamentary group together.): • Sawab+ (5); • AJD/MR+ (4); • UPC+ (1)	10	–
