= Saadani Mint Khaytour =

Member of the Parliament of Mauritania

Saadani Mint Khaytour is a deputy in the government of Mauritania. Mint Khaytour is a member of the Parliament of Mauritania.

In May 2022, Khaytour was ejected from the National Rally for Reform and Development (Tewassoul) party after vocally disagreeing with their stance on women’s rights and slavery in Mauritania.

She later joined the ruling Equity (Insaf) party. In both, she has been active in working to increase protections for women in the country.
