= Alliance of People's Forces =

Alliance of People's Forces إئتلاف قوى الشعب Alliance des forces du peuple
- Rotating president: El Id Ould Mohameden
- Founded: 15 December 2024
- Preceded by: Hope Mauritania (factions)
- Ideology: Left-wing nationalism
- Political position: Centre-left to left-wing
- Parliamentary group: FRUD group
- Members: See composition
- National Assembly: 2 / 176

The Alliance of People's Forces (Arabic: إئتلاف قوى الشعب, romanized: iʾtilāf qiwā aš-šhaʿb, French: Alliance des forces du peuple) is a left-wing political alliance in Mauritania formed in 2024, with its main members including the Union of the Forces of Progress, factions of Hope Mauritania and the Rally of Democratic Forces.

== History ==
The coalition was launched on 15 December 2024 by leaders of the traditional left-wing opposition (represented by the Union of the Forces of Progress and a faction of the Rally of Democratic Forces that opposed Ahmed Ould Daddah's endorsement of Mohamed Ould Ghazouani) and a faction of the new left-wing opposition, represented by a faction of Hope Mauritania, that replaced the traditional parties' prominence in the 2023 elections.

Two FRUD deputies, leader Amadou Tijane Diop and 2024 presidential candidate El Id Ould Mohameden joined the alliance, while FRUD deputy Khally Diallo distanced himself from it.

== Composition ==
Legally recognised parties
Republican Front for Unity and Democracy (FRUD)
Union of the Forces of Progress (UFP)
Rally of Democratic Forces (RFD)
Unregistered parties and organisations
National Union for Democratic Alternation (UNAD)
Organisation for the Liberation and Emancipation of the Haratine (El Hor)
Progressive Popular Movement
Progressive Vanguard Movement
National Forces for Change (FNC)
Progressive Awareness Forum
We Can Movement
