= Equity Party =

Equity Party may refer to:

- Equity Party (Alberta), Canada, originally the Forum Party of Alberta, now defunct
- Equity Party (Mauritania), formed in 2022
