= Trust group =

Parliamentary group in Mauritania

Trust group فريق الأمانة Groupe El Amana
- Chamber: National Assembly
- Legislature(s): 10th
- Foundation: 26 June 2023
- Member parties: El Islah; El Karama; HATEM; El Vadila; PMM
- President: Saleh Ould Hanenna (HATEM)
- Representation: 17 / 176
- Ideology: Populism
- Political position: Big tent

The Trust group (Arabic: فريق الأمانة, French: Groupe El Amana) is a Mauritanian parliamentary group in the National Assembly. It was formed during the 10th National Assembly of Mauritania by parties supportive of President Mohamed Ould Ghazouani.

== List of presidents ==
Name	Term start	Term end
Saleh Mohamedou Hanenna	26 June 2023	present

== Historical membership ==
Year	Seats	Change	Notes
2023	17 / 176	Steady	
