= Union for Democracy and Progress group =

Parliamentary group in Mauritania

Union for Democracy and Progress group فريق الاتحاد من أجل الديمقراطية والتقدم Groupe de l'Union pour la démocratie et le progrès
- Chamber: National Assembly
- Legislature(s): 10th
- Foundation: 26 June 2023
- Member parties: UDP
- President: Naha Mint Mouknass
- Representation: 10 / 176
- Political position: Centre

The Union for Democracy and Progress group (Arabic: فريق الاتحاد من أجل الديمقراطية والتقدم, French: Groupe de l'Union pour la démocratie et le progrès, UDP) is a Mauritanian parliamentary group in the National Assembly. It was created after the Union for Democracy and Progress (UDP) secured ten seats in the 2023 Mauritanian parliamentary election, three more than the required to form a parliamentary group.

== List of presidents ==
Name	Term start	Term end
Naha Hamdi Mouknass	26 June 2023	present

== Historical membership ==
Year	Seats	Change	Notes
2023	10 / 176	Steady	
