= Tewassoul group =

Parliamentary group in Mauritania

Tewassoul group فريق تواصل Groupe Tewassoul
- Chamber: National Assembly
- Legislature(s): 8th, 9th and 10th
- Member parties: Tewassoul
- President: Yahya Ould Aboubecrine
- Representation: 11 / 176
- Ideology: Sunni Islamism
- Political position: Right-wing

The Tewassoul group (Arabic: فريق تواصل, French: Groupe Tewassoul) is a Mauritanian parliamentary group in the National Assembly. The group has been present since the 2013 Mauritanian parliamentary election, when the National Rally for Reform and Development (Tewassoul) entered the National Assembly for the first time.

== List of presidents ==
Name	Term start	Term end
Yahya Aboubecrine Sid Elemine	26 June 2023	present

== Historical membership ==
Year	Seats	Change	Notes
2013	16 / 146	Steady	
2018	14 / 157	▼2	
2023	11 / 176	▼3	
