= National Rally for Reform and Development =

Islamist political party in Mauritania

National Rally for Reform and Development التجمع الوطني للإصلاح و التنمية Rassemblement National pour la Réforme et le Développement
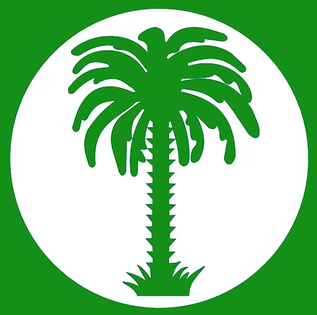
- Abbreviation: Tewassoul; RNRD
- President: Hamadi Ould Sid'El Moctar
- Founded: 2007
- Registered: 4 August 2007
- Preceded by: Centrist Reformists
- Headquarters: Nouakchott, Mauritania
- Membership: ▲130,000 (2022)
- Ideology: Sunni Islamism; Islamic democracy Religious conservatism
- International affiliation: Muslim Brotherhood
- Parliamentary group: Tewassoul group
- National Assembly: 11 / 176
- Regional councils: 36 / 285
- Mayors: 7 / 238

Website
- www.tewassoul.mr

The National Rally for Reform and Development (Arabic: التجمع الوطني للإصلاح و التنمية, romanized: at-tajammuʿ al-waṭani lil iṣlāḥ wat-tanmiya, French: Rassemblement National pour la Réforme et le Développement), often known by its shortened Arabic name Tewassoul (Arabic: تواصل, romanized: Tawāṣṣul) or by the abbreviation of its French name (RNRD), is an Islamist political party in Mauritania. The party is associated with the Mauritanian branch of the Muslim Brotherhood.

As a result of the 2013, 2018 and 2023 parliamentary election Tewassoul has become the second largest political party in Mauritania.

== History ==
The roots of Tewassoul go back to the Islamic Movement that began to be organized in Mauritania in 1975, being based on the ideas of the Muslim Brotherhood, but it remained an unauthorized secret political movement due to the different authoritarian regimes in Mauritania's history.

The Islamists were prevented from licensing any political party even after the introduction of multi-party politics in the 1990s. Nevertheless, the Islamic Movement remained present as a significant force in the local political arena, especially with its rejection of the diplomatic ties established between Mauritania and Israel between 1999 and 2009.

After the 2005 coup, and the overthrow of the regime of President Maaouya Ould Sid'Ahmed Taya, the Islamists tried to register a political party, but the military council leading the transitional phase rejected their request, which prompted them to launch the “Initiative of Moderate Reformists” on November 23, 2005, which enabled them to enter parliament and win some municipalities as independents in the 2006 elections.

The "Centrist Reformists" (successors of the Initiative of Moderate Reformists) endorsed Saleh Ould Hanenna in the first round of the 2007 presidential election, with them backing Ahmed Ould Daddah in the second round.

Tewassoul was finally legally registered on 4 August 2007 after several failed attempts during the Maaouiya Ould Sid'Ahmed Taya regime.

== Leadership ==
=== President ===
- Mohamed Jemil Ould Mansour (2007–25 December 2017)
- Mohamed Mahmoud Ould Seyidi (25 December 2017–25 December 2022)
- Hamadi Ould Sid'El Moctar (25 December 2022–present)

== Electoral performance ==
=== President of Mauritania ===
President of the Islamic Republic of Mauritania
Election year	Candidate	1st round			2nd round			Result	Winning candidate
Election year	Candidate	Votes	%	Rank	Votes	%	Rank	Result	Winning candidate
2009	Mohamed Jemil Ould Mansour	36,864	4.74	4th	—			Lost	Mohamed Ould Abdel Aziz
2014	—							Boycotted	Mohamed Ould Abdel Aziz
2019	Sidi Mohamed Ould Boubacar	165,995	17.87	3rd	—			Lost	Mohamed Ould Ghazouani
2024	Hamadi Ould Sid'El Moctar	126,187	12.76	3rd	—			Lost	Mohamed Ould Ghazouani

=== National Assembly ===
National Assembly
Election	Party leader	National list		Seats	+/–	Government
Election	Party leader	Votes	%	Seats	+/–	Government
2013	Mohamed Jemil Ould Mansour	81,744	13.68%	16 / 146	▲16	Opposition
2018	Mohamed Mahmoud Ould Seyidi	79,283	11.28%	14 / 157	▼2	Opposition
2023	Hamadi Ould Sid'El Moctar	99,431	10.24%	11 / 176	▼3	Opposition

== See also ==
- List of Islamic political parties
