= Republican Front for Unity and Democracy group =

Parliamentary group in Mauritania

Republican Front for Unity and Democracy group فريق الجبهة الجمهورية للوحدة والديمقراطية Groupe du Front Républicain pour l’Unité et la Démocratie
- Chamber: National Assembly
- Legislature(s): 10th
- Foundation: 26 June 2023
- Member parties: Hope Mauritania; Alliance of People's Forces
- President: Kadiata Malick Diallo
- Representation: 7 / 176
- Ideology: Minority rights Egalitarianism
- Political position: Centre-left to left-wing

The Republican Front for Unity and Democracy group (Arabic: فريق الجبهة الجمهورية للوحدة والديمقراطية, French: Groupe du Front Républicain pour l’Unité et la Démocratie) is a Mauritanian parliamentary group in the National Assembly. It was created after the Hope Mauritania coalition secured seven seats in the 2023 Mauritanian parliamentary election, the minimum required to form a parliamentary group.

== List of presidents ==
Name	Term start	Term end
Kadiata Malick Diallo	26 June 2023	present

== Historical membership ==
Year	Seats	Change	Notes
2023	7 / 176	Steady	
