= Justice group =

Parliamentary group in Mauritania

Justice group فريق العدالة Groupe El Adala
- Chamber: National Assembly
- Legislature(s): 10th
- Foundation: 26 June 2023
- Member parties: AND; Nida El Watan
- President: Daoud Ould Ahmed Aicha (Nida El Watan)
- Representation: 11 / 176
- Ideology: Populism
- Political position: Big tent

The Justice group (Arabic: فريق العدالة, French: Groupe El Adala) is a Mauritanian parliamentary group in the National Assembly. It was formed during the 10th National Assembly of Mauritania by parties supportive of President Mohamed Ould Ghazouani.

== List of presidents ==
Name	Term start	Term end
Daoud Abdallahi Ahmed Aicha	26 June 2023	present

== Historical membership ==
Year	Seats	Change	Notes
2023	11 / 176	Steady	
