= 1946 Mauritanian General Council election =

General Council elections were held in Mauritania in December 1946; a second round on 5 January was not required as all seats were filled in the first round of voting. The Socialist and Republican Union emerged as the largest party, winning 16 of the 20 seats.

== Electoral system ==
The General Council was elected by two colleges; the first college elected 6 members and the second 14.

== Results ==
Party	First College			Second College			Total seats
Party	Votes	%	Seats	Votes	%	Seats	Total seats
Socialist and Republican Union			6			10	16
French Union						4	4
Total			6			14	20
Total votes	361	–		7,487	–		
Registered voters/turnout	599	60.27		16,153	46.35		
Source: De Benoist
