= Mohamed Jemil Ould Mansour =

Mauritanian politician

- محمد جميل ولد منصور
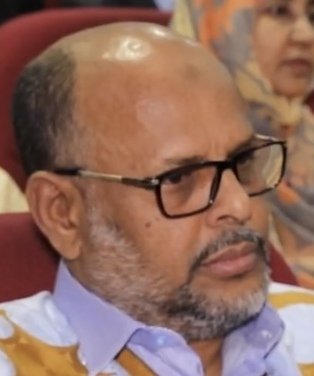

Chairman of the National Rally for Reform and Development
- In office 3 August 2007 – 25 December 2017
- Preceded by: Office established
- Succeeded by: Mohamed Mahmoud Ould Seyidi

Personal details
- Born: 1967 (age 58–59) Nouakchott, Mauritania
- Party: National Rally for Reform and Development (Tewassoul)
- Education: Advanced Institute for Islamic Studies and Research; Mohammed V University

Mohamed Jemil Ould Mansour (born 1967) is a Mauritanian politician. Ould Mansour was a former president of the National Rally for Reform and Development party (Tewassoul) from 2007 to 2017.

== Early life and education ==
Mohamed Jemil Ould Mansour was born in Nouakchott in 1967. He attended primary and secondary school in Nouakchott before going on to study at Mohammed V University in Morocco.

== Politics ==
Ould Mansour first became involved in politics through student unions and activism in the 1980s. In the early 1990s he helped found the Islamic Front, alongside a number of Islamic leaders. The group was denied an application to form a political party by the Maaouya Ould Sid'Ahmed Taya's Government on the grounds that the party's main objective was seeking a monopoly on religion.

Mansour was then arrested in 1994 as part of a campaign of mass arrests by the Mauritanian Government. He was elected Mayor of Arafat in 2001, although he was arrested in 2003 alongside dozens of other Mauritanian Islamists on charges of plotting to overthrow the Mauritanian Government. He was detained for several months, although was released before the 2003 presidential election, for which he supported former Head of State Mohamed Khouna Ould Haidalla.

He was granted asylum from Belgium in 2003 due to the increasing clamp down by the Mauritanian Government on Islamist groups, however he returned to Mauritania in mid-2004.

Following his return to Mauritania he was again arrested, although was released several days later. He helped found the Democratic Forum Party, in which he served as Vice-president. The party was however denied legal status due to its Islamist links.

He was elected to Parliament in the 2006 election.

He was put forward as Tewassoul's candidate for the 2009 presidential election, and came fourth with 4.76% of the vote. Responding to questions over why the party fielded its own candidate instead of fielding a joint candidate with other parties, Mansour justified it on the grounds that the party had an "ambitious program".

In August 2023, Mohamed Jemil Ould Mansour resigned and left the party Tewassoul.
