= Mauritanian Parliament =

Parliament of Mauritania

Mauritanian Parliament برلمان موريتانيا Parlement mauritanien

Type
- Type: Unicameral (formerly Bicameral)
- Seats: 176 members

Elections
- Voting system: Parallel voting

Meeting place
- Nouakchott

Website
- www.assembleenationale.mr

The Mauritanian Parliament (Arabic: برلمان موريتانيا; French: Parlement mauritanien) is composed of a single chamber, the National Assembly. Composed of 176 members, representatives are elected for a five-year term in single-seat constituencies.

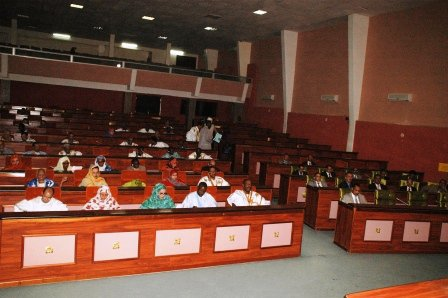
Mauritanian National Assembly in 2005.

Until August 2017, the parliament had an upper house, the Senate. The Senate had 56 members, 53 members elected for a six-year term by municipal councillors with one third renewed every two years and 3 members elected by Mauritanians abroad. It was abolished in 2017, after a referendum.

Currently, the National Assembly is headed by Mohamed Ould Meguett who was elected as its president. The last election was on 13 and 27 May 2023. In it, the Equity Party holds the most number of seats.

== See also ==
- Politics of Mauritania
- List of legislatures by country
