= Mohamed Ould Meguett =

Mauritanian politician

Mohamed Ould Meguett is a Mauritanian politician who is serving as President of 10th National Assembly of Mauritania since June 19, 2023.

== Personal life ==
He was born on December 31, 1957 in Aleg, Brakna region.
