= Hope Mauritania =

Mauritanian left-leaning political coalition

Hope Mauritania أمل موريتانيا Espoir Mauritanie
- Abbreviation: أم (Arabic); EM (French)
- Leader: Collective leadership
- Founded: 22 December 2022
- Split from: Coalition Living Together; Rally of Democratic Forces; Union of the Forces of Progress
- Headquarters: Nouakchott
- Ideology: Egalitarianism; Multiracialism; Reformism; Minority rights Anti-tribalism; Anti-slavery; Anti-establishment
- Political position: Centre-left to left-wing
- Parliamentary group: FRUD group
- Members: See composition
- National Assembly: 7 / 176
- Regional councils: 4 / 285
- Mayors: 0 / 238

Hope Mauritania (Arabic: أمل موريتانيا, romanized: amal mūrītānyā, French: Espoir Mauritanie) is a coalition of several political movements in Mauritania formed with the intention of running in the 2023 parliamentary, regional and local elections. As of 2023, the coalition Hope Mauritania has 7 seats in the National Assembly of Mauritania.

== History ==
The coalition was formally presented and launched in the Old Youth House of Nouakchott, Mauritania, on 22 December 2022, in a ceremony hosted by the Republican Front for Unity and Democracy (FRUD), the only party legally registered of all forming the coalition.

On 7 February 2023, the coalition decided its main candidates for the 2023 parliamentary, regional and local elections. Elid Ould Mohameden and Coumba Dada Kane will lead the mixed national list, Kadiata Malick Diallo will head the women's list and Khally Mamadou Diallo will lead the youth list.

== Ideology ==
Hope Mauritania opposes the government of Mohamed Ould Ghazouani, stressing that "it is based on discrimination and excessive societal political exclusion", noting that "citizens who have lost hope in the various crisis, have been alienated day after day from their legitimate aspirations for a state of law based on the basic principles of human rights that guarantees equality of opportunity, in the wealth of the country, the access to civil status, the right to acquire education and employment, together with a final rejection of slavery, whether modern or traditional".

In another statement, the coalition said it was "against the marginalization of women, patriarchy, misogyny, the infantilization of youth, mass unemployment, birth inequalities, racism, hunger, the destruction of vital ecosystems, the failure of public health, the arrogance of the elites of ignorance and of the commodity, the reason of arms and the unreason of resignation".

== Composition ==
Legally recognised parties
Republican Front for Unity and Democracy (FRUD)
Unregistered parties and organisations
Gathering of Progressive Democrats (RDP)
Bloc of Serious Change (MCC)
Democratic Popular Movement
Inclusive Mauritania
Strong Mauritania Party (PMF)

Ex-MP Kadiata Malick Diallo (ex-UFP) and MPs Mohamed Lemine Ould Sidi Maouloud (ex-Choura) and Elid Ould Mohameden (ex-RFD) also joined the coalition, together with activists El Salek Najem and Abderrahman Hamoudi, intellectual Dr. Abou El Abass Ould Brahim and political actor Achraf Ould Hamoud.

== Electoral performance ==
=== President of Mauritania ===
President of the Islamic Republic of Mauritania
Election year	Candidate	1st round			2nd round			Result	Winning candidate
Election year	Candidate	Votes	%	Rank	Votes	%	Rank	Result	Winning candidate
2024	El Id Ould Mohameden	35,278	3.57%	4th	—			Lost	Mohamed Ould Ghazouani

=== National Assembly ===
National Assembly
Election	Party leader	National list		Seats	+/–	Government
Election	Party leader	Votes	%	Seats	+/–	Government
2023	Collective leadership	32,296	3.33%	7 / 176	▲7	Opposition

== See also ==
- Coordination of Parties of the Majority
- State of Justice Coalition
