= Nana Mint Cheikhna =

Member of the parliament of Mauritania

Nana Mint Cheikhna is a member of Parliament in Mauritania.
