= El Insaf group =

Parliamentary group in Mauritania

El Insaf group فريق الإنصاف Groupe El Insaf
- Chamber: National Assembly
- Legislature(s): 9th and 10th
- Previous name(s): UPR group
- Member parties: El Insaf; HIWAR
- President: Mohamed Lemine Ould Amar
- Representation: 110 / 176
- Ideology: Populism

The El Insaf group (Arabic: فريق الإنصاف, lit. 'Equity group', French: Groupe El Insaf) is a Mauritanian parliamentary group in the National Assembly. The name was first used when the Union for the Republic's group rebranded itself as El Insaf after the party's refoundation during the 9th National Assembly of Mauritania.

The Party of Conciliation and Prosperity (HIWAR) joined the group in the 10th National Assembly of Mauritania following the 2023 parliamentary election.

== List of presidents ==
Name	Term start	Term end
Mohamed Lemine Hamoud Amar	26 June 2023	present

== Historical membership ==
Year	Seats	Change	Notes
2023	110 / 176	Steady	
