= Union for Democracy and Progress =

Union for Democracy and Progress الاتحاد من أجل الديمقراطية والتقدم Union pour la démocratie et le progrès
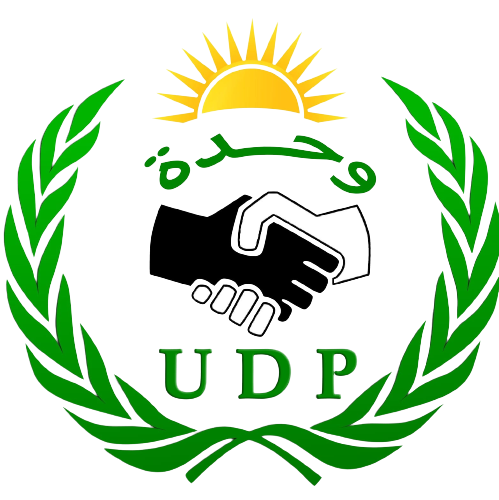
- President: Naha Mint Mouknass
- Founder: Hamdi Ould Mouknass
- Founded: 11 June 1993
- Headquarters: Nouakchott
- Political position: Centre
- National affiliation: Coordination of Parties of the Majority
- International affiliation: Centrist Democrat International
- Parliamentary group: UDP group
- National Assembly: 10 / 176
- Regional councils: 28 / 285
- Mayors: 25 / 238

Election symbol
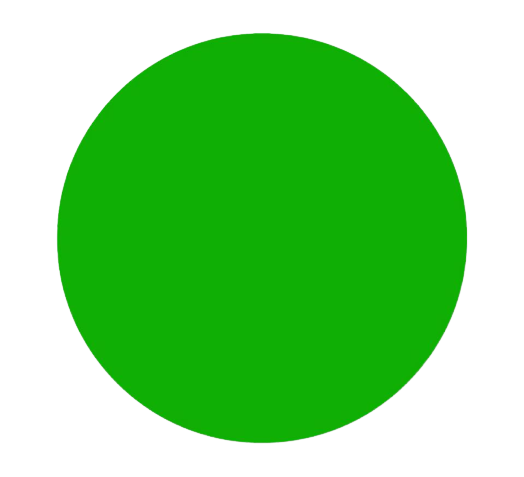

The Union for Democracy and Progress (Arabic: الاتحاد من أجل الديمقراطية والتقدم, romanized: al-ittiḥād min ajl ad-dīmuqrāṭiya wat-taqaddum, French: Union pour la démocratie et le progrès, UDP) is a political party in Mauritania. The UDP is led by Naha Mint Mouknass. As of 2023, the UDP has 10 seats in the National Assembly of Mauritania.

== History ==
The party was founded on June 11, 1993, by former Minister Hamdi Ould Mouknass (Naha's father) who previously served as Minister of Foreign Affairs under President Moktar Ould Daddah.

In the 2001 parliamentary elections, the party received 8.1% of the popular vote and won three of the 81 seats.

In the 2006 parliamentary elections, it won three of the 95 seats, whilst in the Senate elections in 2007 it won only one of the 56 seats. The party supported Sidi Ould Cheikh Abdallahi in the March 2007 presidential election and was part of the presidential majority following his victory. However, after the formation of the government of Prime Minister Yahya Ahmed Ould El Waghef in May 2008, the party left the presidential majority in June 2008, objecting to the composition of the government. It said that, while the opposition had been brought into the government, the UDP had been marginalized; the party also said that "the hope for change born on August 3, 2005 has been compromised", referring to the ouster of President Maaouya Ould Sid'Ahmed Taya on that date.

== Electoral performance ==
=== National Assembly ===
National Assembly
| Election | Party leader | National list | | Seats | +/– | Government |
| Election | Party leader | Votes | % | Seats | +/– | Government |
| 1996 | Hamdi Ould Mouknass | 8,775 | —N/a | 0 / 81 | 0 | Opposition |
| 2001 | Naha Mint Mouknass | —N/a | | 3 / 81 | ▲3 | Opposition |
| 2006 | Naha Mint Mouknass | —N/a | | 3 / 95 | 0 | Opposition |
| 2013 | Naha Mint Mouknass | 20,470 | 3.42% | 6 / 146 | ▲3 | Government |
| 2018 | Naha Mint Mouknass | 30,495 | 4.34% | 6 / 157 | 0 | Government |
| 2023 | Naha Mint Mouknass | 58,823 | 6.06% | 10 / 176 | ▲4 | Government |
