= National Democratic Alliance (Mauritania) =

Political party in Mauritania

National Democratic Alliance التحالف الوطني الديمقراطي Alliance nationale démocratique
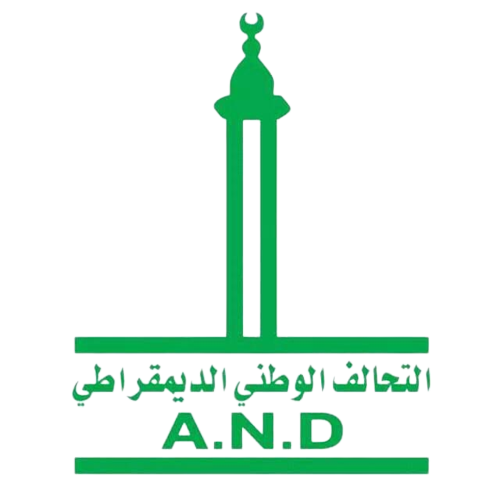
- Leader: Yacoub Ould Moine
- Founded: January 2016
- Split from: Rally of Democratic Forces
- Headquarters: Nouakchott
- Ideology: Social democracy
- Political position: Centre
- National affiliation: Coordination of Parties of the Majority
- Parliamentary group: Justice group
- National Assembly: 6 / 176
- Regional councils: 11 / 285
- Mayors: 5 / 238

The National Democratic Alliance (Arabic: التحالف الوطني الديمقراطي, romanized: at-taḥāluf al-waṭani ad-dīmuqrāṭi, French: Alliance nationale démocratique, AND) is a centrist political party in Mauritania. It became the fifth largest political party of the country after the 2018 parliamentary elections. The AND backs the administration of Mohamed Ould Ghazouani and is part of the Coordination of Parties of the Majority.

As of 2023, the party has 6 seats in the National Assembly of Mauritania.

== History ==
The party was created in January 2016 after Yacoub Ould Moine, ex-MP for the Rally of Democratic Forces (RFD), left the party and applied to register a new party called "Democratic Alliance" in December 2015, although the party got its current name when registered.

The party is considered to represent the Moine family and to have been created by Ould Moine due to the refusal of Ahmed Ould Daddah, leader of the RFD, of a dialogue with the government that doesn't have previously set conditions and in order to get closer to the administration of Mohamed Ould Abdel Aziz, although the party remained first as part of a "moderate opposition".

The party emphasizes the need for "national unity" and "social peace of the Nation" being untouchable lines and supports strengthening the country's institutions.

During the 2023 parliamentary elections, the AND party won six seats.

== Electoral performance ==
=== National Assembly ===
National Assembly
Election	Party leader	National list		Seats	+/–	Government
Election	Party leader	Votes	%	Seats	+/–	Government
2018	Yacoub Ould Moine	22,148	3.15%	4 / 146	▲4	Support
2023	Yacoub Ould Moine	32,027	3.30%	6 / 176	▲2	Support
