= National Assembly (Mauritania) =

Unicameral national legislature of Mauritania

National Assembly: الجمعية الوطنية (Arabic); Asaambele ngenndi (Pulaar); Ëttu Ndawi réew (Wolof)
- 10th National Assembly
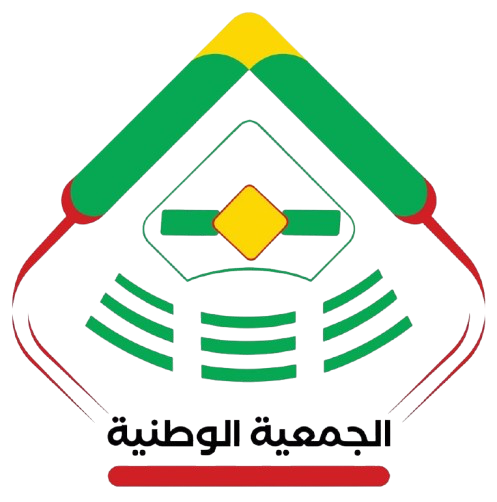

Type
- Type: Unicameral house of Parliament of Mauritania Lower house (1992–2017) None (1978–1992) Unicameral (1959–1978)

History
- Founded: May 1959
- Preceded by: Territorial Assembly

Leadership
- President: Mohamed Ould Meguett, El Insaf since 19 June 2023
- Vice-Presidents: Moussa Demba Sow, El Insaf since 21 June 2023
- Ahmedou Ould M'Balla, Tewassoul since 21 June 2023
- Ousmane Racine Sanghott, UDP since 21 June 2023
- Fatimetou Mint Habib, El Insaf since 21 June 2023
- Isselmou Ould Khatry, El Insaf since 21 June 2023

Structure
- Seats: 176
- Political groups: Government (129) El Insaf (107): El Insaf (107); UDP (10): UDP (10); Justice (6): AND (6); Trust (6): El Islah (6); Confidence and supply (19) Trust (11): El Karama (5); HATEM (3); El Vadila (2); Independent (1); Justice (5): Nida El Watan (5); El Insaf (3): HIWAR (3); Opposition (28) Tewassoul (11): Tewassoul (11); Non-attached (10): Sawab–RAG (5) (Note: RAG (4); Sawab (1)); AJD/MR+ (4); State of Justice (1) (Note: Independent (1)); FRUD (7): Hope Mauritania (5) (Note: FRUD (2); TAJ (1); RDP (1); PMF (1)); People's Forces (2) (Note: FRUD (2))
- Committees: Five: Islamic Orientation, Human Resources and Socio-Cultural Affairs; Finances; Economic Affairs; Justice, Defense and Interior; Foreign Relations

Elections
- Voting system: Parallel voting
- First election: 17 May 1959
- Last election: 13 and 27 May 2023
- Next election: 2028

Meeting place
- New National Assembly building, Nouakchott

Website
- assembleenationale.mr

Rules
- Rules of the National Assembly (French)

Footnotes
- Footnotes

The National Assembly (Arabic: الجمعية الوطنية, romanized: al-Jamʻīyah al-Waṭanīyah; Pulaar: 𞤀𞤧𞤢𞥄𞤥𞤦𞤫𞤤𞤫 𞤲𞤺𞤫𞤲𞤲𞤣𞤭, romanized: Asaambele ngenndi; Wolof: Ëttu Ndawi réew) is the unicameral legislative house of the Parliament of Mauritania. The legislature currently has 176 deputies, elected for five-year terms in electoral districts or nationwide proportional lists.

From 1961 until 1978, the only legal party in the country was the Mauritanian People's Party (French: Parti du Peuple Mauritanien, PPM). The legislature was disbanded after the 10 July 1978 coup. In 1992, a bicameral legislature was established, consisting the National Assembly and Senate of Mauritania. In the 1990s, a multiparty system was introduced in Mauritania. However, the Democratic and Social Republican Party (PRDS) dominated the parliament until a coup in 2005. After the 2008 military coup, the Union for the Republic has been the dominating force of the National Assembly until it was rebranded as the Equity Party (El Insaf) in 2022.

On 19 June 2023 Mohamed Ould Meguett was elected President of the National Assembly.

== History ==
=== Colonial Mauritania ===
After the Second World War, the French Union was established, granting Colonial Mauritania the right to elect a representative to the French National Assembly and a local assembly. In 1946 a General Council was elected, composed of 20 members elected through censitary suffrage in two electoral colleges, one for French citizens and other for voters with an indigenous status (Mauritanians and nationals of other territories). This council only had a consultative function, debating on local issues and non-political questions.

In 1952 universal suffrage was introduced for the first time, with the creation and election of a 24-member Territorial Council, also elected through two electoral colleges. This Territorial Council soon evolved into the Territorial Assembly, elected in 1957 without the segregation of voters in two colleges. This Territorial Assembly established the first Mauritanian autonomous government under French administration and declared the establishment of the Islamic Republic of Mauritania on 28 November 1958 after a French-backed referendum.

The National Assembly was first elected in 1959 as a constituent assembly to draft a constitution and proclaim the independence of Mauritania from France on 28 November 1960.

=== Ould Daddah regime ===
In 1961 this Assembly amended the constitution to change the country's political system from a parliamentary republic to a presidential one.

== Electoral system ==
The 176 deputies are elected by two methods (with Mauritanians being able to cast four different votes in a parallel voting system); 125 are elected from single- or multi-member electoral districts based on the departments (or moughataas) that the country is subdivided in (which the exception of Nouakchott, which has been divided in three 7-seat constituencies based on the three regions (or wilayas) the city is subdivided in instead of the single 18-seat constituency that was used in 2018), using either the two-round system or proportional representation; in single-member constituencies candidates require a majority of the vote to be elected in the first round and a plurality in the second round. In two-seat constituencies, voters vote for a party list (which must contain one man and one woman); if no list receives more than 50% of the vote in the first round, a second round is held, with the winning party taking both seats. In constituencies with three or more seats, closed list proportional representation is used, with seats allocated using the largest remainder method. For three-seat constituencies, party lists must include a female candidate in first or second on the list; for larger constituencies a zipper system is used, with alternate male and female candidates.

The Mauritania diaspora gets allocated four seats, with the 2023 election being the first time Mauritanians in the diaspora were able to directly elect their representatives.

The remaining 51 seats are elected from three nationwide constituencies, also using closed list proportional representation: a 20-seat national list (which uses a zipper system), a 20-seat women's national list and a new 11-seat youth list (with two reserved for people with special needs), which also uses a zipper system to guarantee the representation of women.

=== Number of seats ===
The number of seats in the National Assembly has varied over the years. In 1959 there were 40 seats, increasing to 50 in 1971, 70 in 1975 (with 7 seats temporarily added during the 1975–1979 Mauritanian occupation of Western Sahara), 79 in 1992, 81 in 2001, 95 in 2006, 146 in 2013, and 157 in 2018. The number of seats will increase in 2023 to 176 after an election reform.

Seat evolution of the Mauritanian National Assembly per legislature
Legislature	Seats
Constituent	40
1st	40
2nd	50
3rd	70
3rd (post-1976)	77
4th	79
5th	79
6th	81
7th	95
8th	146
9th	157
10th	176

== See also ==
- List of presidents of the National Assembly of Mauritania
- Senate of Mauritania, former upper house 1992-2017
