= El Karama =

El Karama حزب الكرامة Parti El Karama
- Leader: Cheikhna Ould Hajbou
- Founded: 12 October 2011
- Ideology: Social democracy
- Political position: Centre
- National affiliation: Coordination of Parties of the Majority
- Parliamentary group: Trust group
- National Assembly: 5 / 176
- Regional councils: 10 / 285
- Mayors: 7 / 238

Website
- partielkarama.wordpress.com

El Karama (Arabic: حزب الكرامة, romanized: ḥizb al-karāma, lit. 'Dignity Party') is a political party in Mauritania led by Cheikhna Ould Mohamed Ould Hajbou.

== History ==
El Karama was founded on 12 October 2011. It won six seats in the 2013 parliamentary elections, and retained all six seats in the 2018 elections.

In the 2023 parliamentary elections El Karama won five seats in the National Assembly of Mauritania.

== Ideology ==
El Karama identifies as a social democratic party.

== Election results ==
=== National Assembly ===
Election	Leader	National list		Seats	+/–	Status
Election	Leader	Votes	%	Seats	+/–	Status
2013	Cheikhna Ould Hajbou	15,193	2.54%	6 / 146	▲6	Support
2018	Cheikhna Ould Hajbou	24,761	3.52%	6 / 157	Steady	Support
2023	Cheikhna Ould Hajbou	25,437	2.62%	5 / 176	▼1	Support
