= Nida El Watan =

Nida El Watan حزب نداء الوطن
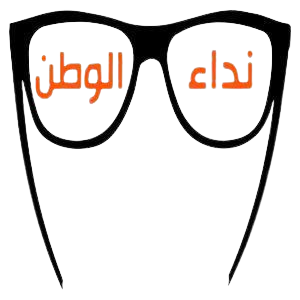
- Leader: Daoud Ould Ahmed Aicha
- Founded: 10 April 2015
- Registered: 13 October 2016
- Ideology: Bidhani interests Mauritanian nationalism Centralism
- Political position: Far-right
- National affiliation: Coordination of Parties of the Majority
- Parliamentary group: Justice group
- National Assembly: 5 / 176
- Regional councils: 4 / 285
- Mayors: 3 / 238

Nida El Watan (Arabic: حزب نداء الوطن, romanized: ḥizb nidāʾ al-waṭan, lit. 'Nation’s Call Party') is a Bidhani supremacist political party in Mauritania.

The party was formed on 10 April 2015 by controversial political activist Daoud Ould Ahmed Aicha, with it being formally recognised by the Ministry of Interior on 13 October 2016.

== Ideology ==
The party states its goal to be the establishment of a national state in Mauritania and to "consolidate the ancestral Arab Bidhani identity". The party defends the construction of a Mauritanian national identity based on the dominant Bidhani identity (including the Haratine due to the shared culture around the Hassaniya variant of Arabic) while considering the rest of ethnic groups of the country as protected national minorities, arguing that the lack of a stable national identity outlook in Mauritania, which has historically seen a competition between Arab nationalism and a more African-oriented identity as part of the country's politics, would risk the stability and unity of the country.

The party's leader is known for his controversial statements on ethnic politics in Mauritania, most notably on slavery, where Ould Ahmed Aicha stated his rejection to what he called "the blackmailing of certain groups within the country by those who trafficked in the issue of slavery". Ould Ahmed Aicha previously threatened to "return to the era of slave captivity, before the establishment of the Mauritanian state" and to "take his faction to arms".

The party heavily opposes the Initiative for the Resurgence of the Abolitionist Movement (IRA) and its associated Refoundation for a Global Action party (RAG) led by Biram Dah Abeid, considering it an "extremist" party.

== Election results ==
=== National Assembly ===
National Assembly
| Election | Party leader | National list | | Seats | +/– | Government |
| Election | Party leader | Votes | % | Seats | +/– | Government |
|---|---|---|---|---|---|---|
| 2018 | Daoud Ould Ahmed Aicha | 3,366 | 0.48% | 0 / 157 | 0 | Opposition |
| 2023 | Daoud Ould Ahmed Aicha | 24,268 | 2.50% | 5 / 176 | ▲5 | Support |
