= El Vadila =

El Vadila حزب الفضيلة Parti El Vadila
- Leader: Ethmane Ould Cheikh Ahmed Eboul Mealy
- Founded: 2006
- Ideology: Islamism
- Religion: Sunni Islam
- Parliamentary group: Trust group
- National Assembly: 2 / 176
- Regional councils: 4 / 285
- Mayors: 2 / 238

El Vadila (Arabic: حزب الفضيلة, romanized: ḥizb al-vaḍīla, lit. 'Virtue Party') is an Islamist political party in Mauritania, led by Ethmane Ould Ahmed Aboulmaaly.

== History ==
The party was officially registered in 2006. It won three seats in the 2013 parliamentary elections. Although it lost all three seats in the 2018 elections, it won two seats in the 2023 elections.
