= El Islah =

El Islah حزب الإصلاح Parti El Islah
- Leader: Mohamed Ould Talebna
- Registered: 4 August 2007
- National affiliation: Coordination of Parties of the Majority
- International affiliation: Socialist International (observer, from 2025)
- Parliamentary group: Trust group
- National Assembly: 6 / 176
- Regional councils: 15 / 285
- Mayors: 10 / 238

Website
- lislah.net

El Islah (Arabic: حزب الإصلاح, romanized: ḥizb al-iṣlāḥ, lit. 'Reform Party') is a political party in Mauritania currently led by Mohamed Ould Talebna. As of 2023, the party has six seats in the National Assembly.

== History ==
The party was legally recognised on 4 August 2007 after having been rejected by the transitional junta due to it considering some of its leaders too close to the government of the deposed president Maaouya Ould Sid'Ahmed Taya.

The party joined the coalition supporting Mohamed Ould Abdel Aziz in March 2011. It won a single seat in the 2013 parliamentary elections. It retained its seat in the 2018 elections.

Several parties merged into El Islah in 2020:

- The Democratic National Convergence (CDN), led by the former Minister of Justice Mahfoudh Ould Bettah, joined El Islah on 29 July 2020.
- The Party of Civilisation and Development (PCD), led by Hamma Ould Soueilem, joined El Islah on 20 August 2020.
- The Mauritanian Hope Party (PEM), led by Tahiya Mint El Habib, joined El Islah on 3 September 2020.

In the 2023 parliamentary elections El Islah won six seats.

== Election results ==
=== National Assembly ===
Election	Leader	National list		Seats	+/–	Status
Election	Leader	Votes	%	Seats	+/–	Status
2013	Sidna Ould Maham	3,885	0.66%	1 / 146	▲1	Support
2018	Mohamed Ould Talebna	5,334	0.76%	1 / 157	0	Support
2023	Mohamed Ould Talebna	31,877	3.28%	6 / 176	▲5	Support
