= Mauritanian Party of Union and Change =

Political party in Mauritania

Mauritanian Party of Union and Change حزب الإتحاد و التغيير الموريتاني Parti Mauritanien de l’Union et du Changement
- President: Saleh Ould Hanenna
- Founded: 26 January 2006
- Ideology: Mauritanian nationalism Economic liberalism Social conservatism Islamic democracy
- Political position: Centre-right to right-wing
- National affiliation: Coordination of Parties of the Majority
- Parliamentary group: Trust group
- National Assembly: 3 / 176
- Regional councils: 7 / 285
- Mayors: 1 / 238

Website
- www.hatem.mr

The Mauritanian Party of Union and Change (Arabic: حزب الاتحاد والتغيير الموريتاني, romanized: ḥizb al-ittiḥād wat-taġyīr al-muritāni, French: Parti mauritanien de l'union et du changement), often known by its shortened Arabic abbreviation HATEM (Arabic: حاتم, romanized: ḥātm), is a political party in Mauritania. It has been led since its foundation by Saleh Ould Hanenna.

== Ideology ==
The party stands on the right of the political spectrum, supporting civic nationalist, socially conservative and economically liberal policies while defending the role of religion in the Mauritanian state.

=== Basic principles of the party ===
1. Maintaining Islam's role as a source of legislation in the country and its presence as the religion of the Mauritanian people and state. The party interprets Islam as a religion of progress and development, standing against extremism.
2. A united Mauritanian national identity based on its Arab and African roots, seeking to maintain the Arabic language as the state's sole national language and making it the cohesive element of the Mauritanian nation, with the party also supporting the teaching of other national languages (Wolof, Pulaar and Soninké) in schools.
3. A Mauritanian national unity based on the religion shared by the population (Islam) and on a Mauritanian civic nationalism based on the country's cultural diversity (Arabs, Wolof, Fulani and Soninke).
4. A commitment to defend Mauritania's sovereignty and borders.
5. A democratic system "stemming from the country’s cultural specificity"; peaceful transfer of power; separation of powers and rule of law.
6. Equal opportunities among citizens and preserving human dignity by consolidating social justice and removing all forms of discrimination.
7. Adopting an economic system that fosters competition while protecting citizens under a state that guarantees basic jobs, taking into account the balance between the public and private sectors in a way that limits the negative effects of the market economy.
8. Sustainable development based on rational and balanced management of the country’s various natural resources.
9. A government that protects family values and establishes punitive justice and meritocracy.
10. A republican system that leads to loyalty to the Mauritanian state.
11. A foreign policy based on securing the country's strategic interests, strengthening Mauritania's Islamic and Arab-African character, and ensuring the interests of Mauritanians abroad.

== Electoral performance ==
=== National Assembly ===
National Assembly
Election	Party leader	National list		Seats	+/–	Government
Election	Party leader	Votes	%	Seats	+/–	Government
2006	Saleh Ould Hanenna	—		3 / 95	▲3	—
2013	Saleh Ould Hanenna	Boycotted		0 / 146	▼3	Opposition
2018	Saleh Ould Hanenna	6,521	0.93%	0 / 157	0	Opposition
2023	Saleh Ould Hanenna	28,124	2.90%	3 / 176	▲3	Support
