= Naha Mint Mouknass =

Mauritanian politician

Naha bint Mouknass
- الناهة بنت مكناس
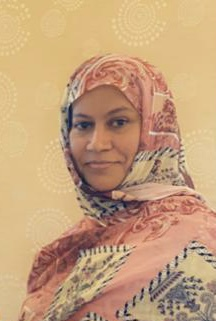

Minister for Foreign Affairs and Cooperation
- In office 5 August 2009 – 22 March 2011
- President: Mohamed Ould Abdel Aziz
- Prime Minister: Moulaye Ould Mohamed Laghdaf
- Preceded by: Mohamed Mahmoud Ould Mohamedou
- Succeeded by: Hamadi Ould Baba Ould Hamadi

Personal details
- Born: 10 March 1969 (age 57) Nouakchott, Mauritania
- Party: Union for Democracy and Progress (UDP)
- Relations: Hamdi Ould Mouknass (father)
- Education: Superior Institute of Management in Paris
- Profession: Politician, Diplomat

Naha bint Mouknass (Arabic: الناهة بنت مكناس; born 10 March 1969) is a Mauritanian politician. She was the Minister for Foreign Affairs and Cooperation of Mauritania, serving in this capacity between 2009 and 2011.

== Early life and education ==
Bint Mouknass was born in 1969 in Nouakchott, she is the daughter of Hamdi Ould Mouknass, who served as Foreign Minister under Moktar Ould Daddah. Her family belongs to the El-Gor warrior tribe from the Dakhlet Nouadhibou Region.

She attended the Superior Institute of Management in Paris, graduating in 1995.

== Career ==
Following her graduation, she returned to Nouakchott to work for the Coca-Cola Company.

In 2000, she became the President of the Union for Democracy and Progress (UDP). She later became an Advisor to President Maaouya Ould Sid'Ahmed Taya, serving in such a capacity between 2000 and 2001. Following this she was appointed Minister Advisor to the Presidency, serving from 2001 to the military ouster of President Ould Taya in August 2005.

Bint Mouknass speaks Hassaniya Arabic, French, and English.

She was appointed Foreign Minister in August 2009, the first woman in Mauritania to head such a ministry.

In 2016 she was the Mauritanian Industry, Trade and Tourism Minister.
