= Saleh Ould Hanenna =

Mauritanian soldier and political figure

Saleh Ould Hanenna (born on September 20, 1965) is a former Mauritanian soldier and political figure.

Saleh Ould Hanenna served in the Mauritanian Army and rose to the rank of Major before being officially dismissed in 2000.

In June 2003, he led an attempted coup, aiming to overthrow President Maaouya Ould Sid'Ahmed Taya. He commanded a rebel section of the Army during two days of heavy fighting in Nouakchott which caused the death of dozens of people. With the complete failure of the coup, Ould Hanenna initially escaped capture, and formed an opposition group called the "Knights of Change" with former officer Mohamed Ould Cheikhna, but he was captured and arrested on October 9, 2004.

The Government of Mauritania accused Saleh Ould Hanenna of attempting to organize coups on two further occasions, in August and September 2004, with the alleged backing of Libya and Burkina Faso. A death sentence was initially recommended at his subsequent trial, but he was instead given life imprisonment at the conclusion of the trial on February 3, 2005.

In August 2005, Colonel Ely Ould Mohamed Vall led a successful coup in the country that ousted President Maaouya Ould Sid'Ahmed Taya. The Military Council for Justice and Democracy (CMJD) which subsequently took charge of the government released Ould Hanenna in a general amnesty in early September.

On January 9, 2007, Ould Hanenna, the president of the Mauritanian Union for Change (HATEM), was unanimously chosen by that party's executive committee as its candidate in the March 2007 presidential election. He took sixth position in the poll, with 7.65% of the votes cast, and subsequently backed Ahmed Ould Daddah for the second round.

Ould Hanenna served as President of the Coordination of Democratic Opposition, a political coalition made up of parties opposed to General Mohamed Ould Abdel Aziz led government in Mauritania.
