= Equity Party (Mauritania) =

Ruling political party in Mauritania

Equity Party حزب الإنصاف Parti El Insaf
- President: Sid'Ahmed Ould Mohamed
- President of the parliamentary group: Mohammed Lemine Ould Amar
- Founded: 3 July 2022
- Preceded by: Union for the Republic
- Headquarters: Nouakchott
- Ideology: Populism
- National affiliation: Coordination of Parties of the Majority
- International affiliation: Centrist Democrat International
- Parliamentary group: El Insaf group
- Slogan: الميزان (The balance/scale)
- National Assembly: 107 / 176
- Regional councils: 124 / 285
- Mayors: 165 / 238

Website
- partielinsaf.mr

The Equity Party (Arabic: حزب الإنصاف, romanized: ḥizb al-inṣāf; French: Parti de l'équité), often known by the transliteration of its Arabic name El Insaf, is a political party in Mauritania. It was founded on 3 July 2022 after the governing Union for the Republic rebranded itself ahead of the 2023 Mauritanian parliamentary election.

== Leadership ==
=== President ===
- Mohamed Melainine Ould Eyih (3 July 2022 – 16 August 2024)
- Sid'Ahmed Ould Mohamed (17 August 2024 – present).

== Electoral performance ==
=== President of Mauritania ===
President of the Islamic Republic of Mauritania
Election year	Candidate	1st round			2nd round			Result	Winning candidate
Election year	Candidate	Votes	%	Rank	Votes	%	Rank	Result	Winning candidate
2024	Mohamed Ould Ghazouani	554,959	56.12%	1st	—N/a			Elected	Mohamed Ould Ghazouani

=== National Assembly ===
National Assembly
Election	Party leader	National list		Seats	+/–	Government
Election	Party leader	Votes	%	Seats	+/–	Government
2023	Mohamed Melainine Ould Eyih	342,153	35.25%	107 / 176	▲14 (Note: Compared to the result obtained by the Union for the Republic in 2018.)	Government

== See also ==
- El Insaf group, the corresponding Mauritanian parliamentary group in the National Assembly.
