= Regional councils of Mauritania =

A regional council (Arabic: مجلس جهوي, French: conseil régional) is the elected assembly of a region of Mauritania.

== Electoral system ==
=== After 2023 ===
On 26 September 2022 all Mauritanian political parties reached an agreement sponsored by the Ministry of Interior and Decentralisation to reform the election system ahead of the upcoming 2023 elections after weeks of meetings between all parties.

Starting from the 2023 elections, regional councils will be elected in a single round using proportional representation through the largest remainder method, with no threshold being applied. The head of the list that gets the most votes will automatically become president of the regional council.

== List of councils ==
Region	Legislature name	Seat	Members	President	Last election
Adrar	Regional Council of Adrar	Atar	15	Mohamed Ould Cherif Ould Abdallahi; El Insaf	13 May 2023
Assaba	Regional Council of Assaba	Kiffa	25	Mohamed Mahmoud Ould Habib; El Insaf	13 May 2023
Brakna	Regional Council of Brakna	Aleg	25	Moustapha Ould Mahmoud; El Insaf	13 May 2023
Dakhlet Nouadhibou	Regional Council of Dakhlet Nouadhibou	Nouadhibou	21	Mohamed Mamy Ould Mohamed Bezeid; El Insaf	13 May 2023
Gorgol	Regional Council of Gorgol	Kaédi	25	Ba Amadou Abou; El Insaf	13 May 2023
Guidimaka	Regional Council of Guidimaka	Sélibaby	25	Coulibaly Issa; El Insaf	13 May 2023
Hodh Ech Chargui	Regional Council of Hodh Ech Chargui	Néma	25	Mohamed Ould Tijani; El Insaf	13 May 2023
Hodh El Gharbi	Regional Council of Hodh El Gharbi	Aïoun	25	Jamal Ould Mohamed; El Insaf	13 May 2023
Inchiri	Regional Council of Inchiri	Akjoujt	11	Cheikh Melainine Ould El Gharaby; El Insaf	13 May 2023
Nouakchott	Regional Council of Nouakchott	Nouakchott	37	Fatimetou Mint Abdel Malick; El Insaf	13 May 2023
Tagant	Regional Council of Tagant	Tidjikja	15	Mohamed Ould Biha; El Insaf	13 May 2023
Tiris Zemmour	Regional Council of Tiris Zemmour	Zouérate	11	El Hadrami Ould H'Mady; El Insaf	13 May 2023
Trarza	Regional Council of Trarza	Rosso	25	Mohamed Ould Cheikh; El Insaf	13 May 2023
