= Mohamed Ould Ghazouani =

President of Mauritania since 2019

General Mohamed Ould Ghazouani
- محمد ولد الغزواني
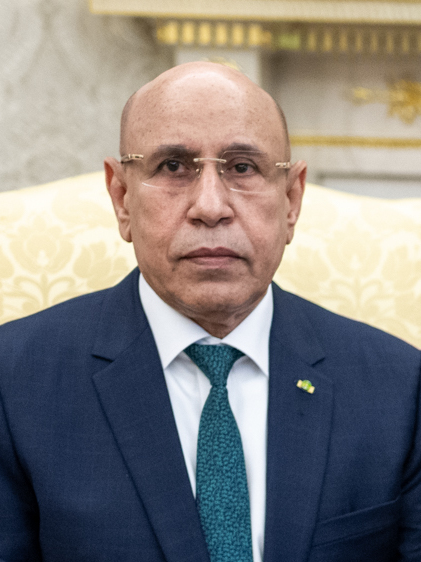
- Ghazouani in 2025

9th President of Mauritania
- Incumbent
- Assumed office 1 August 2019
- Prime Minister: Mohamed Salem Ould Béchir; Ismail Ould Bedde Ould Cheikh Sidiya; Mohamed Ould Bilal; Mokhtar Ould Djay
- Preceded by: Mohamed Ould Abdel Aziz

22nd Chairperson of the African Union
- In office 17 February 2024 – 15 February 2025
- Preceded by: Azali Assoumani
- Succeeded by: João Lourenço

Minister of Defense
- In office October 2018 – 15 March 2019
- President: Mohamed Ould Abdel Aziz
- Prime Minister: Mohamed Salem Ould Béchir
- Preceded by: Jallow Mamadou Bhatia
- Succeeded by: Yahya Ould Hademine

Chief of Army Staff
- In office 13 May 2008 – 6 November 2018
- President: Mohamed Ould Abdel Aziz
- Preceded by: Felix Negri
- Succeeded by: Mohamed Cheikh Ould Mohamed Lemine

Personal details
- Born: 4 December 1956 (age 69) Boumdeid, Assaba region, Colonial Mauritania
- Party: Equity Party (since 2022)
- Other political affiliations: Union for the Republic (until 2022)
- Spouse: Mariem Mint Dah
- Children: 3
- Education: Meknes Royal Military Academy
- Occupation: Politician; military officer

Military service
- Allegiance: Mauritania
- Branch/service: Mauritanian Army
- Years of service: 1970s–2018
- Rank: General
- Commands: General Director of National Security; Chief of National Army Staff
- Battles/wars: See battles: 2005 Military Coup; Military Junta; 2008 Military Coup; Military Junta; Al-Qaeda in the Islamic Maghreb; Areich Hind; Wagadou Forest; Bassikounou

Mohamed Ould Cheikh Mohamed Ahmed Ould Ghazouani (Note: Arabic: محمد ولد الشيخ محمد أحمد ولد الغزواني) (born 4 December 1956), also known as Ghazouani and Ould Ghazouani, is a Mauritanian politician and retired army general who has been the 9th President of Mauritania since 2019, and the 22nd chairperson of the African Union from February 2024 until February 2025.

Ghazouani is a former general-director of National Security and former chief of staff of the Armed Forces of Mauritania (2008–2018). He was defense minister of Mauritania from October 2018 to March 2019. At that time a close ally of his predecessor Mohamed Ould Abdel Aziz, he was elected president of Mauritania on 22 June 2019 following the 2019 presidential election. His victory in the 2019 presidential election was presented as having been the country's first peaceful transition of power since independence.

Ghazouani has overseen a period of relative stability in Mauritania. He has worked to improve social security and combat corruption, including the arrest of his predecessor. Ghazouani also played a crucial role in eliminating jihadist violence, modernizing the military, and engaging with communities and Islamist groups.

== Personal life ==
Ghazouani was born in Boumdeid, Assaba region on 4 December 1956. He belongs to a well-known Berber-Sufi family in Mauritania. Ghazouani is the son of a spiritual leader of the Maraboutic tribe Ideiboussat. Ghazouani has memorised the Quran.

He is married to a doctor, Mariam Bint Mohamed Fadel Ould Dah. They have three children.

== Career ==
=== Military career ===
He joined the Mauritanian Army in the late 1970s. He continued his training as an officer in the Meknes Royal Military Academy in Morocco. He received a baccalaureate degree, a master's degree in Administration and Military Sciences, and completed several war training certificates and courses.

Ghazouani was aide-de-camp to President Maaouya Ould Sid'Ahmed Taya from 1987 to 1991.

Ghazouani was an ally of former president Mohamed Ould Abdel Aziz, and was his partner in the overthrow of President Sidi Ould Cheikh Abdallahi in 2008, and was a member of the military junta that ousted former president Maaouya Ould Sid'Ahmed Taya in 2005.

=== Political career ===
In October 2018, President Mohamed Ould Abdel Aziz named Ghazouani as Defense Minister of Mauritania.

On 1 March 2019, Ghazouani announced his candidacy for the presidency, seeking to replace Abdel Aziz. On 15 March he resigned as defense minister to pursue his presidential ambition.

=== Presidency (2019–) ===
On 22 June 2019, Ghazouani became Mauritania's elected president after a presidential election against five other candidates. On 1 August 2019, he was officially sworn in as the 9th President of Mauritania.

Shortly after being sworn in, his relations with former president Mohamed Ould Abdel Aziz soured, due to revelations of financial misconduct committed by the former president. A parliamentary probe was opened into Aziz’s activities in August 2020, and he was officially sentenced in December 2023. Aziz claimed that Ghazouani had given the former president two large bags filled with seven million euros after being elected.

As defense minister and president, Ghazouani significantly contributed to defeating al-Qaeda in the Maghreb, which had carried out deadly attacks in Mauritania from 2005 to 2011. His efforts, including community outreach, mediation with Islamist groups, and military upgrades, have been considered effective against armed militant Jihadists.

Ghazouani paid the costs of treatment for the radio presenter Salka mint Sneid.

In October 2024, Ghazouani attended the 16th BRICS summit in Kazan, Russia, where he met with Russian President Vladimir Putin. In July 2025, he joined four other West African leaders at a White House summit with President Donald Trump to promote Mauritania's mineral resources and strategic location.

== See also ==
- List of current heads of state and government
- List of heads of the executive by approval rating

== Notes ==
Political offices
Preceded by Mohamed Ould Abdel Aziz	President of Mauritania; 2019–present	Incumbent
