= Nouadhibou (National Assembly district) =

Constituency of the National Assembly of Mauritania

- electoral district for the National Assembly
- Location of Nouadhibou in Mauritania
- Moughataa: Nouadhibou
- Wilaya: Dakhlet Nouadhibou
- Electorate: 55,754 (2023)

Current electoral district
- Created: 1992
- Seats: 4 (2018–present); 3 (2001–2018); 2 (1992–2001)
- Deputies: El Karama (1); El Insaf (1); Tewassoul (1); AJD/MR (1)

Nouadhibou (Arabic: انواذيبو) is one of the 60 electoral districts represented in the National Assembly. The constituency currently elects 4 deputies. Its boundaries correspond to those of the Mauritanian moughataa of Nouadhibou. The electoral system uses the largest remainder method and a closed-list proportional representation, with no minimum threshold.

== Historic representation ==
Historic composition of the district
Key to parties RFD AC APP AJD/MR El Karama RD RDU–PAGN UPR El Insaf PRDS Tewassoul
Legislature	Election	Distribution
4th	1992	1 / 1
5th	1996	1 / 1
6th	2001	1 / 1 / 1
7th	2006	1 / 1 / 1
8th	2013	1 / 1 / 1
9th	2018	1 / 1 / 1 / 1
10th	2023	1 / 1 / 1 / 1

=== List of deputies ===
Legislature	Member	Party
4th	Brahim Ould Bakar	PRDS
4th	Koné Mahmoud	RDU–PAGN
5th	Brahim Ould Bakar	PRDS
5th	Chrif Ahmed Ould Moussa	AC
6th	Cherif Ahmed Ould Mohamed Moussa	PRDS
6th	Ousmane Moussa Thiam	AC
6th	El Alem Ahmed Yacoub	RFD
7th	El Ghassem Bellali Bellali	RD
7th	Cheikh Ould Hamdi	RFD
7th	Deddahi Ould Mohamed Salem	APP
8th	El Ghassem Bellali Bellali	El Karama
8th	Mohamed Cheik Ayé	UPR
8th	Ousmane Moussa Thiam	AJD/MR
9th	El Ghassem Bellali Bellali	El Karama
9th	Mohamed Cheik Ayé	UPR
9th	Ahmed Bezeid Mohamedene Matt	Tewassoul
9th	Ousmane Moussa Thiam	AJD/MR
10th	El Ghassem Bellali Bellali	El Karama
10th	Mohamed Abdellahi El Mamy El Ghailany	El Insaf
10th	Aziza Saleck Jiddou	Tewassoul
10th	Ousmane Moussa Thiam	AJD/MR

== Election results ==
=== 2023 ===
Parliamentary Election 2023: Nouadhibou
Party	Votes	%	Seats
El Karama	5,836	16.69	1
El Insaf	5,817	16.63	1
National Rally for Reform and Development	2,819	8.06	1
Alliance for Justice and Democracy/Movement for Renewal	2,363	6.76	1
Democratic Alternation Pole (Sawab–RAG)	2,012	5.75	0
Union of the Forces of Progress and Rally of Democratic Forces	1,966	5.62	0
Hope Mauritania	1,710	4.89	0
Union for Democracy and Progress	1,449	4.14	0
Republican Party for Democracy and Renewal	1,434	4.10	0
Mauritanian Party of Union and Change	1,192	3.41	0
National Cohesion for Rights and the Construction of Generations	1,169	3.34	0
El Islah	920	2.63	0
National Democratic Alliance	911	2.61	0
Party of Conciliation and Prosperity	872	2.49	0
Burst of Youth for the Nation	842	2.41	0
El Ravah	664	1.90	0
People's Progressive Alliance	550	1.57	0
Party of Unity and Development	334	0.96	0
State of Justice	332	0.95	0
Party of Construction and Progress	291	0.83	0
Centre through Action for Progress	198	0.57	0
Party of the Mauritanian Masses	149	0.43	0
El Vadila	140	0.40	0
Nida El Watan	120	0.34	0
Blank votes	879	2.51	–
Total	34,969	100.00	4
Valid votes	34,969	87.69	
Invalid votes	4,907	12.31	
Total votes	39,876	100.00	
Registered voters/turnout	55,754	71.52	
Source: National Independent Election Commission

=== 2018 ===
Parliamentary Election 2018: Nouadhibou
Party	Votes	%	Seats
El Karama	4,981	17.70	1
Union for the Republic	4,325	15.37	1
National Rally for Reform and Development	3,448	12.25	1
Alliance for Justice and Democracy/Movement for Renewal	1,883	6.69	1
Rally of Democratic Forces	1,775	6.31	0
People's Progressive Alliance	1,188	4.22	0
Union of the Forces of Progress	1,138	4.04	0
El Islah	969	3.44	0
Union for Democracy and Progress	900	3.20	0
Democratic Alternation Pole (Sawab–RAG)	660	2.35	0
Party of Unity and Development	552	1.96	0
El Ghad	487	1.73	0
National Democratic Alliance	485	1.72	0
El Moustaqbel	454	1.61	0
El Wiam	447	1.59	0
Movement for Refoundation	433	1.54	0
El Ravah	347	1.23	0
Mauritanian Party for Reform and Equality	344	1.22	0
National Cohesion for Rights and the Construction of Generations	297	1.06	0
Vanguard of the Forces of Democratic Change	244	0.87	0
Movement for Direct Democracy	234	0.83	0
El Vadila	231	0.82	0
Rally for Equality and Justice	230	0.82	0
Burst of Youth for the Nation	192	0.68	0
Democratic Alliance Party	153	0.54	0
Party of the Mauritanian Masses	143	0.51	0
New Generation Party	137	0.49	0
Mauritanian Authenticity Party	135	0.48	0
Party of Civilisation and Development	131	0.47	0
Party of the Union of the Democratic Youth	109	0.39	0
National Democratic Convergence	90	0.32	0
Party of the Democratic People	87	0.31	0
New Vision	87	0.31	0
Rally for Freedom and Democracy	75	0.27	0
Blank votes	752	2.67	–
Total	28,143	100.00	4
Valid votes	28,143	82.28	
Invalid votes	6,059	17.72	
Total votes	34,202	100.00	
Registered voters/turnout	50,807	67.32	
Source: National Independent Election Commission

=== 2013 ===
Parliamentary Election 2013: Nouadhibou
Party	Votes	%	Seats
El Karama	6,447	26.42	1
Union for the Republic	4,429	18.15	1
Alliance for Justice and Democracy/Movement for Renewal	3,087	12.65	1
National Rally for Reform and Development	2,162	8.86	0
El Wiam	1,598	6.55	0
People's Progressive Alliance	3,002	12.30	0
Burst of Youth for the Nation	606	2.48	0
Union for Democracy and Progress	590	2.42	0
Mauritanian Hope Party	311	1.27	0
Unitary Party for the Construction of Mauritania	302	1.24	0
Movement for Direct Democracy	290	1.19	0
Popular Front	233	0.95	0
Democratic Concertation Party	226	0.93	0
Sawab	151	0.62	0
Democratic and Social Ribat Party	132	0.54	0
Party of Civilisation and Development	111	0.45	0
Party of Unity and Development	111	0.45	0
Rally for Unity	100	0.41	0
Dignity and Action Party	96	0.39	0
Social Democratic Party	50	0.20	0
Blank votes	368	1.51	–
Total	24,402	100.00	3
Valid votes	24,402	80.78	
Invalid votes	5,806	19.22	
Total votes	30,208	100.00	
Registered voters/turnout	42,612	70.89	
Source: National Independent Election Commission
