= Nouakchott-Nord (National Assembly district) =

Constituency of the National Assembly of Mauritania

- electoral district for the National Assembly
- Location of Nouakchott-Nord in Mauritania
- Moughataa: Dar Naïm; Teyarett; Toujounine
- Wilaya: Nouakchott-Nord
- Electorate: 120,387 (2023)

Current electoral district
- Created: 2023
- Seats: 7
- Deputies: El Insaf (2); Tewassoul (1); AND (1); Sawab–RAG (1); Hope MR (1); UDP (1)
- Created from: Nouakchott

Nouakchott-Nord (Arabic: نواكشوط الشمالية) is one of the 60 electoral districts represented in the National Assembly. The constituency currently elects 7 deputies. Its boundaries correspond to those of the Mauritanian wilaya of Nouakchott-Nord. The electoral system uses the largest remainder method and a closed-list proportional representation, with no minimum threshold.

== Historic representation ==
Historic composition of the district
Key to parties Hope Mauritania Sawab–RAG AND UDP El Insaf Tewassoul
Legislature	Election	Distribution
10th	2023	1 / 1 / 1 / 1 / 2 / 1

=== List of deputies ===
Legislature	Member	Party
10th	Ahmed Jiddou Zein Limane	El Insaf
10th	Zeine Alabidine El Mounir Toulba	El Insaf
10th	Isselkou Mohamed Salem Bahah	Tewassoul
10th	Cheikh Mohamed Abderrahmane Moine	AND
10th	Abd Selam Horma Horma	Sawab–RAG
10th	Mohamed Lemine El Moctar Sidi Maouloud	Hope Mauritania
10th	Mohamed El Moctar Sidi Zoghmane	UDP

== Election results ==
=== 2023 ===
Parliamentary Election 2023: Nouakchott-Nord
Party	Votes	%	Seats
El Insaf	17,473	27.63	2
National Rally for Reform and Development	9,639	15.24	1
National Democratic Alliance	4,030	6.37	1
Democratic Alternation Pole (Sawab–RAG)	3,122	4.94	1
Hope Mauritania	2,758	4.36	1
Union for Democracy and Progress	2,705	4.28	1
El Islah	2,424	3.83	0
State of Justice	1,550	2.45	0
Party of Unity and Development	1,523	2.41	0
National Cohesion for Rights and the Construction of Generations	1,511	2.39	0
Rally of Democratic Forces	1,437	2.27	0
El Ravah	1,415	2.24	0
Party of Construction and Progress	1,310	2.07	0
Party of the Mauritanian Masses	1,223	1.93	0
Republican Party for Democracy and Renewal	1,202	1.90	0
People's Progressive Alliance	1,163	1.84	0
El Vadila	1,157	1.83	0
Union of the Forces of Progress	1,137	1.80	0
Mauritanian Party of Union and Change	912	1.44	0
Burst of Youth for the Nation	898	1.42	0
El Karama	783	1.24	0
Party of Conciliation and Prosperity	690	1.09	0
Nida El Watan	658	1.04	0
Alliance for Justice and Democracy/Movement for Renewal	619	0.98	0
Centre through Action for Progress	458	0.72	0
Blank votes	1,433	2.27	–
Total	63,230	100.00	7
Valid votes	63,230	85.95	
Invalid votes	10,334	14.05	
Total votes	73,564	100.00	
Registered voters/turnout	120,387	61.11	
Source: National Independent Election Commission
