= Results breakdown of the 2023 Mauritanian parliamentary election =

(Mauritania)	Main: 2023 Mauritanian parliamentary election
← 2018 13 and 27 May 2023 TBD →
Party		Votes	%	Seats
	El Insaf	342,153	35.3%	107
	Tewassoul	99,475	10.3%	11
	UDP	58,823	6.1%	10
	Sawab–RAG	39,807	4.1%	5
	Hope MR	32,315	3.3%	7
	AND	31,987	3.3%	6
	El Islah	31,854	3.3%	6
	HATEM	28,124	2.9%	3
	El Karama	25,437	2.6%	5
	Nida El Watan	24,268	2.5%	5
	AJD/MR+	21,163	2.2%	4
	HIWAR	20,206	2.1%	3
	PMM	20,187	2.1%	1
	El Vadila	17,301	1.8%	2
	CED	15,028	1.6%	1
	Others	162,370	16.7%	0
Total		970,498	100.0%	176

This is the results breakdown of the parliamentary elections held in Mauritania on 13 and 27 May 2023. The following tables will show detailed results in all of the electoral districts of the country.

== Electoral system ==
On 26 September 2022 all Mauritanian political parties reached an agreement sponsored by the Ministry of Interior and Decentralisation to reform the election system ahead of the upcoming elections after weeks of meetings between all parties.

The 176 members (an increase of 17 members compared to 2018) of the National Assembly will be elected by two methods (with Mauritanians being able to cast four different votes in a parallel voting system); 125 are elected from single- or multi-member electoral districts based on the departments (or moughataas) that the country is subdivided in (Note: Six new departments were created in September 2021, which have led to an increase in seats representing them.) (with the exception of Nouakchott, which has been divided in three 7-seat constituencies for this election based on the three regions (or wilayas) the city is subdivided in instead of the single 18-seat constituency that was used in 2018), using either the two-round system or proportional representation; in single-member constituencies candidates require a majority of the vote to be elected in the first round and a plurality in the second round. In two-seat constituencies, voters vote for a party list (which must contain one man and one woman); if no list receives more than 50% of the vote in the first round, a second round is held, with the winning party taking both seats. In constituencies with three or more seats, closed list proportional representation is used, with seats allocated using the largest remainder method. For three-seat constituencies, party lists must include a female candidate in first or second on the list; for larger constituencies a zipper system is used, with alternate male and female candidates.

The Mauritania diaspora gets allocated four seats, with this election being the first time Mauritanians in the diaspora are able to directly elect their representatives.

The remaining 51 seats are elected from three nationwide constituencies, also using closed list proportional representation: a 20-seat national list (which uses a zipper system), a 20-seat women's national list and a new 11-seat youth list (with two reserved for people with special needs), which also uses a zipper system to guarantee the representation of women.

== Overall ==
Party	National PR list				Total	
Party	Votes	%	Seats	±	Seats	±
El Insaf	342,153	35.26%	7	+3	107	+14
Others	136,120	14.03%	0	-4	0	-12
National Rally for Reform and Development (Tewassoul)	99,475	10.25%	2	-1	11	-3
Union for Democracy and Progress (UDP)	58,823	6.06%	1	=	10	-4
Sawab and allies (Sawab+)	39,807	4.10%	1	=	5	+2
Republican Front for Unity and Democracy and allies (Hope Mauritania)	32,315	3.33%	1	New	7	New
National Democratic Alliance (AND)	31,987	3.30%	1	=	6	+2
El Islah	31,854	3.28%	1	+1	6	+5
Mauritanian Party of Union and Change (HATEM)	28,124	2.90%	1	+1	3	+2
El Karama	25,437	2.62%	1	=	5	-1
Nida El Watan	24,268	2.50%	1	+1	5	+5
Alliance for Justice and Democracy/Movement for Renewal and allies (AJD/MR+)	21,163	2.18%	1	+1	4	+3
Party of Conciliation and Prosperity (HIWAR)	20,206	2.08%	1	=	3	+2
Party of the Mauritanian Masses (PMM)	20,187	2.08%	1	+1	1	+1
El Vadila	17,301	1.78%	0	=	2	+2
Union for Planning and Building and allies (State of Justice)	15,028	1.55%	0	=	1	+1
Blank votes	26,250	2.70%				
Valid votes	970,498	75.88%				
Null votes	308,490	24.12%				
Seats			20	=	176	+19
Turnout	1,278,988	71.59%				
Abstentions	507,460	28.41%				
Registered voters	1,786,448					
Source: National Independent Election Commission (CENI)

=== Results per electoral district ===
Wilaya	District	Seats won											Total	
Wilaya	District	El Insaf	Tewassoul	UDP	Sawab+	Hope MR	AND	El Islah	El Karama	NW	AJD/MR+	Others	Total	
Adrar	Aoujeft	1											1	5
Adrar	Atar	2											2	5
Adrar	Chinguetti	1											1	5
Adrar	Ouadane							1					1	5
Assaba	Barkéol	2											2	10
Assaba	Boumdeid	1											1	10
Assaba	Guerou		1									1 (Note: El Vadila (elected in coalition with Tewassoul) (1))	2	10
Assaba	Kankoussa	2											2	10
Assaba	Kiffa	1								1		1 (Note: HIWAR (1))	3	10
Brakna	Aleg	2											2	12
Brakna	Bababé	2											2	12
Brakna	Boghé	2											2	12
Brakna	Magta Lahjar	2											2	12
Brakna	Male	2											2	12
Brakna	M'Bagne	2											2	12
Dakhlet Nouadhibou	Chami	1											1	5
Dakhlet Nouadhibou	Nouadhibou	1	1						1		1		4	5
Gorgol	Kaédi	1		1							1		3	11
Gorgol	Lexeiba	1											1	11
Gorgol	Maghama	2											2	11
Gorgol	M'Bout	1					1		1				3	11
Gorgol	Monguel	2											2	11
Guidimagha	Ghabou			2									2	8
Guidimagha	Ould Yengé			2									2	8
Guidimagha	Sélibaby	2											2	8
Guidimagha	Wompou	2											2	8
Hodh Ech Chargui	Adel Begrou	2											2	14
Hodh Ech Chargui	Amourj	2											2	14
Hodh Ech Chargui	Bassiknou	2											2	14
Hodh Ech Chargui	Djigueni	2											2	14
Hodh Ech Chargui	N'Beiket Lahwach	1											1	14
Hodh Ech Chargui	Néma	2											2	14
Hodh Ech Chargui	Oualata	1											1	14
Hodh Ech Chargui	Timbédra	2											2	14
Hodh El Gharbi	Aïoun El Atrous	2											2	10
Hodh El Gharbi	Koubenni	1		1						1			3	10
Hodh El Gharbi	Tamchekett	2											2	10
Hodh El Gharbi	Tintane	2											2	10
Hodh El Gharbi	Touil									1			1	10
Inchiri	Akjoujt	1											1	2
Inchiri	Bénichab	1											1	2
Nouakchott-Nord		2	1	1	1	1	1						7	21
Nouakchott-Ouest		2	1			1	1	1				1 (Note: UPC+ (elected in coalition with El Vadila) (1))	7	21
Nouakchott-Sud		3	1		1	1			1				7	21
Tagant	Moudjéria	2											2	5
Tagant	Tichitt	1											1	5
Tagant	Tidjikja	2											2	5
Tiris Zemmour	Bir Moghrein							1					1	4
Tiris Zemmour	F'Déirick	1											1	4
Tiris Zemmour	Zouérate	2											2	4
Trarza	Boutilimit	2											2	14
Trarza	Keur Macéne	2											2	14
Trarza	Méderdra	2											2	14
Trarza	Ouad Naga	2											2	14
Trarza	R'Kiz	2											2	14
Trarza	Rosso	2											2	14
Trarza	Tékane	2											2	14
Diaspora	Africa	1											1	4
Diaspora	America					1							1	4
Diaspora	Asia		1										1	4
Diaspora	Europe	1											1	4
Total		89	6	7	2	4	3	3	3	3	2	3	125	
Source: National Independent Election Commission (CENI)

== Results ==
=== National lists ===
==== National list ====
Party	Votes	%	Seats	±
El Insaf	342,153	35.26%	7	+3
National Rally for Reform and Development (Tewassoul)	99,475	10.25%	2	-1
Union for Democracy and Progress (UDP)	58,823	6.06%	1	=
Sawab and allies (Sawab+)	39,807	4.10%	1	=
Republican Front for Unity and Democracy and allies (Hope Mauritania)	32,315	3.33%	1	New
National Democratic Alliance (AND)	31,987	3.30%	1	=
El Islah	31,854	3.28%	1	+1
Mauritanian Party of Union and Change (HATEM)	28,124	2.90%	1	+1
El Karama	25,437	2.62%	1	=
Nida El Watan	24,268	2.50%	1	+1
Alliance for Justice and Democracy/Movement for Renewal and allies (AJD/MR+)	21,163	2.18%	1	+1
Party of Conciliation and Prosperity (HIWAR)	20,206	2.08%	1	=
Party of the Mauritanian Masses (PMM)	20,187	2.08%	1	+1
Republican Party for Democracy and Renewal (PRDR)	19,110	1.97%	0	=
Union of the Forces of Progress (UFP)	17,387	1.79%	0	-1
El Vadila	17,301	1.78%	0	=
Party of Unity and Development (PUD)	16,129	1.66%	0	=
Union for Planning and Building and allies (State of Justice)	15,028	1.55%	0	=
Rally of Democratic Forces (RFD)	14,652	1.51%	0	-1
Burst of Youth for the Nation (PSJN)	14,345	1.48%	0	-1
El Ravah	13,858	1.43%	0	=
People's Progressive Alliance (APP)	12,115	1.25%	0	-1
National Cohesion for Rights and the Construction of Generations (Ribat)	10,418	1.07%	0	=
Party of Construction and Progress (PCP)	9,293	0.96%	0	=
Centre through Action for Progress (CAP)	8,813	0.91%	0	New
Blank votes	26,250	2.70%		
Valid votes	970,498	75.88%		
Null votes	308,490	24.12%		
Seats			20	=
Turnout	1,278,988	71.59%		
Abstentions	507,460	28.41%		
Registered voters	1,786,448			
Source: National Independent Election Commission (CENI)

==== National women's list ====
Party	Votes	%	Seats	±
El Insaf	329,364	34.38%	7	+3
National Rally for Reform and Development (Tewassoul)	103,406	10.79%	2	-1
Union for Democracy and Progress (UDP)	59,399	6.20%	1	=
Sawab and allies (Sawab+)	38,546	4.02%	1	=
Republican Front for Unity and Democracy and allies (Hope Mauritania)	35,673	3.72%	1	New
El Islah	33,314	3.48%	1	=
Mauritanian Party of Union and Change (HATEM)	32,660	3.41%	1	+1
National Democratic Alliance (AND)	26,299	2.74%	1	=
Nida El Watan	25,018	2.61%	1	+1
El Karama	23,592	2.46%	1	=
El Vadila	20,583	2.15%	1	+1
Party of Conciliation and Prosperity (HIWAR)	20,053	2.09%	1	+1
Alliance for Justice and Democracy/Movement for Renewal and allies (AJD/MR+)	19,548	2.04%	1	+1
Union for Planning and Building and allies (State of Justice)	16,551	1.73%	0	=
Union of the Forces of Progress (UFP)	16,385	1.71%	0	-1
Republican Party for Democracy and Renewal (PRDR)	15,880	1.66%	0	=
Party of Unity and Development (PUD)	15,601	1.63%	0	=
Party of the Mauritanian Masses (PMM)	13,901	1.45%	0	=
El Ravah	13,838	1.44%	0	=
National Cohesion for Rights and the Construction of Generations (Ribat)	13,532	1.41%	0	=
People's Progressive Alliance (APP)	13,123	1.37%	0	-1
Rally of Democratic Forces (RFD)	12,043	1.26%	0	-1
Centre through Action for Progress (CAP)	10,699	1.12%	0	New
Party of Construction and Progress (PCP)	10,627	1.11%	0	=
Burst of Youth for the Nation (PSJN)	10,373	1.08%	0	
Blank votes	28,104	2.94%		
Valid votes	958,112	74.98%		
Null votes	319,741	25.02%		
Seats			20	=
Turnout	1,277,853	71.53%		
Abstentions	508,595	28.47%		
Registered voters	1,786,448			
Source: National Independent Election Commission (CENI)

==== National youth's list ====
Party	Votes	%	Seats	±
El Insaf	333,368	34.61%	4	New
National Rally for Reform and Development (Tewassoul)	103,064	10.70%	1	New
Union for Democracy and Progress (UDP)	58,983	6.12%	1	New
Sawab and allies (Sawab+)	38,626	4.01%	1	New
Republican Front for Unity and Democracy and allies (Hope Mauritania)	33,880	3.52%	1	New
El Islah	32,882	3.41%	1	New
Mauritanian Party of Union and Change (HATEM)	31,988	3.32%	1	New
National Democratic Alliance (AND)	29,232	3.03%	1	New
Nida El Watan	25,316	2.63%	0	New
Union for Planning and Building and allies (State of Justice)	25,107	2.61%	0	New
El Karama	24,327	2.53%	0	New
Alliance for Justice and Democracy/Movement for Renewal and allies (AJD/MR+)	19,658	2.04%	0	New
Party of Unity and Development (PUD)	18,953	1.97%	0	New
Party of Conciliation and Prosperity (HIWAR)	18,539	1.92%	0	New
El Vadila	16,850	1.75%	0	New
El Ravah	16,225	1.68%	0	New
Union of the Forces of Progress (UFP)	15,715	1.63%	0	New
Republican Party for Democracy and Renewal (PRDR)	15,297	1.59%	0	New
Rally of Democratic Forces (RFD)	13,926	1.45%	0	New
Centre through Action for Progress (CAP)	13,297	1.38%	0	New
People's Progressive Alliance (APP)	12,548	1.30%	0	New
Party of the Mauritanian Masses (PMM)	11,215	1.16%	0	New
Burst of Youth for the Nation (PSJN)	10,716	1.11%	0	New
National Cohesion for Rights and the Construction of Generations (Ribat)	10,439	1.08%	0	New
Party of Construction and Progress (PCP)	6,052	0.63%	0	New
Blank votes	27,117	2.82%		
Valid votes	963,320	75.42%		
Null votes	313,888	24.58%		
Seats			11	+11
Turnout	1,277,208	71.49%		
Abstentions	509,240	28.51%		
Registered voters	1,786,448			
Source: National Independent Election Commission (CENI)

=== Adrar ===
==== Aoujeft ====
Party	First round		Second round		Seats	±
Party	Votes	%	Votes	%	Seats	±
Union for Democracy and Progress (UDP)	3,137	34.25%	3,896	45.42%	0	=
El Insaf	3,115	34.01%	4,550	53.04%	1	=
El Karama and El Islah	2,179	23.79%			0	=
National Rally for Reform and Development (Tewassoul)	282	3.08%			0	=
Union of the Forces of Progress (UFP)	278	3.03%			0	=
People's Progressive Alliance (APP)	71	0.78%			0	New
National Cohesion for Rights and the Construction of Generations (Ribat)	32	0.35%			0	New
Blank votes	66	0.71%	132	1.54%		
Valid votes	9,160	92.98%	8,578	98.63%		
Null votes	692	7.02%	119	1.37%		
Seats					1	=
Turnout	9,852	77.83%	8,697	68.71%		
Abstentions	2,806	22,17%	3,961	31.29%		
Registered voters	12,658		12,658			
Source: National Independent Election Commission (CENI)

==== Atar ====
Party	First round		Second round		Seats	±
Party	Votes	%	Votes	%	Seats	±
El Insaf	7,730	48.18%	10,009	68.41%	2	=
El Islah	3,574	22.27%	4,096	28.00%	0	New
National Rally for Reform and Development (Tewassoul)	1,765	11.00%			0	=
National Democratic Alliance (AND)	692	4.31%			0	New
People's Progressive Alliance (APP)	672	4.19%			0	=
Sawab and allies (Sawab+)	502	3.13%			0	=
National Cohesion for Rights and the Construction of Generations (Ribat)	364	2.27%			0	=
Blank votes	746	4.65%	526	3.59%		
Valid votes	16,045	86.34%	14,631	96.35%		
Null votes	2,539	13.66%	555	3.65%		
Seats					2	=
Turnout	18,584	69.57%	15,186	56.85%		
Abstentions	8,127	30.43%	11,525	43.15%		
Registered voters	26,711		26,711			
Source: National Independent Election Commission (CENI)

==== Chinguetti ====
Party	First round		Second round		Seats	±
Party	Votes	%	Votes	%	Seats	±
El Insaf	3,865	57.35%			1	=
El Ravah	2,683	39.81%			0	New
Sawab and allies (Sawab+)	64	0.95%			0	=
El Karama	49	0.73%			0	New
Blank votes	78	1.16%				
Valid votes	6,739	95.14%				
Null votes	344	4.86%				
Seats					1	=
Turnout	7,083	67.25%				
Abstentions	3,449	32.75%				
Registered voters	10,532					
Source: National Independent Election Commission (CENI)

==== Ouadane ====
Party	First round		Second round		Seats	±
Party	Votes	%	Votes	%	Seats	±
El Islah	1,467	56.36%			1	New
El Insaf	1,087	41.76%			0	-1
People's Progressive Alliance (APP)	27	1.04%			0	New
National Cohesion for Rights and the Construction of Generations (Ribat)	13	0.50%			0	New
Blank votes	9	0.34%				
Valid votes	2,603	97.13%				
Null votes	77	2.87%				
Seats					1	=
Turnout	2,680	78.13%				
Abstentions	750	21.87%				
Registered voters	3,430					
Source: National Independent Election Commission (CENI)

=== Assaba ===
==== Barkéol ====
Party	First round		Second round		Seats	±
Party	Votes	%	Votes	%	Seats	±
El Insaf	13,573	63.16%			2	=
National Rally for Reform and Development (Tewassoul)	5,638	26.24%			0	=
Union of the Forces of Progress (UFP)	1,665	7.75%			0	=
Alliance for Justice and Democracy/Movement for Renewal and allies (AJD/MR+)	189	0.88%			0	New
Blank votes	425	1.97%				
Valid votes	21,490	74.26%				
Null votes	7,447	25.74%				
Seats					2	=
Turnout	28,937	76.56%				
Abstentions	8,858	23.44%				
Registered voters	37,795					
Source: National Independent Election Commission (CENI)

==== Boumdeid ====
Party	First round		Second round		Seats	±
Party	Votes	%	Votes	%	Seats	±
El Insaf	5,838	80.09%			1	=
National Rally for Reform and Development (Tewassoul)	1,364	18.71%			0	=
Sawab and allies (Sawab+)	32	0.44%			0	New
National Cohesion for Rights and the Construction of Generations (Ribat)	15	0.21%			0	New
Republican Front for Unity and Democracy and allies (Hope Mauritania)	6	0.08%			0	New
Blank votes	34	0.47%				
Valid votes	7,289	95.62%				
Null votes	334	4.38%				
Seats					1	=
Turnout	7,623	70.83%				
Abstentions	3,140	29.17%				
Registered voters	10,763					
Source: National Independent Election Commission (CENI)

==== Guerou ====
Party	First round		Second round		Seats	±
Party	Votes	%	Votes	%	Seats	±
El Insaf	8,623	48.55%	9,169	47.83%	0	-2
National Rally for Reform and Development and El Vadila (Tewassoul-El Vadila)	8,378	47.17%	9,649	50.34%	2	+2
Sawab and allies (Sawab+)	451	2.54%			0	=
National Cohesion for Rights and the Construction of Generations (Ribat)	72	0.41%			0	New
Blank votes	236	1.33%	351	1.83%		
Valid votes	17,760	91.69%	19,169	96.96%		
Null votes	1,609	8.31%	601	3.04%		
Seats					2	=
Turnout	19,369	74.99%	19,770	76.54%		
Abstentions	6,459	25.01%	6,058	23.46%		
Registered voters	25,828		25,828			
Source: National Independent Election Commission (CENI)

==== Kankossa ====
Party	First round		Second round		Seats	±
Party	Votes	%	Votes	%	Seats	±
El Insaf	10,911	62.77%			2	=
Union for Democracy and Progress (UDP)	2,524	14.52%			0	New
National Democratic Alliance (AND)	1,385	7.97%			0	=
National Rally for Reform and Development (Tewassoul)	1,383	7.96%			0	New
Sawab and allies (Sawab+)	760	4.37%			0	=
People's Progressive Alliance (APP)	206	1.19%			0	=
Blank votes	213	1.22%				
Valid votes	17,382	81.49%				
Null votes	3,949	18.51%				
Seats					2	=
Turnout	21,331	73.67%				
Abstentions	7,623	26.33%				
Registered voters	28,954					
Source: National Independent Election Commission (CENI)

==== Kiffa ====
Party	Votes	%	Seats	±
Nida El Watan	7,506	20.36%	1	New
El Insaf	7,492	20.33%	1	=
Party of Conciliation and Prosperity (HIWAR)	5,779	15.68%	1	New
National Rally for Reform and Development (Tewassoul)	4,778	12.96%	0	-1
El Islah	4,630	12.56%	0	New
Mauritanian Party of Union and Change (HATEM)	4,261	11.56%	0	New
Sawab, allies, Republican Front for Unity and Democracy and allies (Sawab-FRUD+)	727	1.97%	0	=
Union of the Forces of Progress (UFP)	696	1.89%	0	=
Union for Planning and Building and allies (State of Justice)	186	0.50%	0	New
People's Progressive Alliance (APP)	182	0.49%	0	=
Alliance for Justice and Democracy/Movement for Renewal and allies (AJD/MR+)	122	0.33%	0	=
National Cohesion for Rights and the Construction of Generations (Ribat)	110	0.30%	0	New
Rally of Democratic Forces (RFD)	69	0.19%	0	New
Blank votes	321	0.88%		
Valid votes	36,859	83.38%		
Null votes	7,349	16.62%		
Seats			3	=
Turnout	44,208	72.35%		
Abstentions	16,894	27.65%		
Registered voters	61,102			
Source: National Independent Election Commission (CENI)

=== Brakna ===
==== Aleg ====
Party	First round		Second round		Seats	±
Party	Votes	%	Votes	%	Seats	±
El Insaf	13,888	57.09%			2	+1
National Rally for Reform and Development and National Democratic Alliance (Tewassoul-AND)	6,565	26.99%			0	-1
Mauritanian Party of Union and Change (HATEM)	866	3.56%			0	New
El Karama	722	2.97%			0	=
Republican Front for Unity and Democracy and allies (Hope Mauritania)	659	2.71%			0	New
Sawab and allies (Sawab+)	601	2.47%			0	=
Rally of Democratic Forces (RFD)	384	1.58%			0	=
Blank votes	643	2.63%				
Valid votes	24,328	84.45%				
Null votes	4,480	15.55%				
Seats					2	-1
Turnout	28,808	77.35%				
Abstentions	8,436	22.65%				
Registered voters	37,244					
Source: National Independent Election Commission (CENI)

==== Bababé ====
Party	First round		Second round		Seats	±
Party	Votes	%	Votes	%	Seats	±
El Insaf	5,058	37.69%	6,711	62.82%	2	=
Alliance for Justice and Democracy/Movement for Renewal and allies (AJD/MR+)	3,539	26.37%	3,786	35.44%	0	n/a
Union for Democracy and Progress (UDP)	2,959	22.05%			0	=
Union of the Forces of Progress (UFP)	519	3.87%			0	n/a
National Rally for Reform and Development (Tewassoul)	476	3.55%			0	=
Sawab and allies (Sawab+)	357	2.66%			0	=
National Democratic Alliance (AND)	173	1.29%			0	=
National Cohesion for Rights and the Construction of Generations (Ribat)	24	0.18%			0	New
Blank votes	314	2.34%	186	1.74%		
Valid votes	13,419	88.43%	10,683	97.59%		
Null votes	1,756	11.57%	264	2.41%		
Seats					2	=
Turnout	15,175	76.26%	10,947	55.02%		
Abstentions	4,723	23.74%	8,951	44.98%		
Registered voters	19,898		19,898			
Source: National Independent Election Commission (CENI)

==== Boghé ====
Party	First round		Second round		Seats	±
Party	Votes	%	Votes	%	Seats	±
El Insaf	8,712	38.73%	12,157	66.80%	2	=
Party of Unity and Development (PUD)	3,560	15.83%	5,564	30.57%	0	New
Party of Conciliation and Prosperity (HIWAR)	2,453	10.91%			0	New
Republican Front for Unity and Democracy and allies (Hope Mauritania)	2,234	9.93%			0	New
Alliance for Justice and Democracy/Movement for Renewal and allies (AJD/MR+)	2,151	9.56%			0	n/a
Sawab and allies (Sawab+)	931	4.14%			0	=
People's Progressive Alliance and National Rally for Reform and Development (APP-Tewassoul)	686	3.05%			0	n/a
Union of the Forces of Progress (UFP)	581	2.58%			0	=
National Democratic Alliance (AND)	389	1.73%			0	=
El Vadila	262	1.16%			0	New
National Cohesion for Rights and the Construction of Generations (Ribat)	230	1.02%			0	New
Blank votes	297	1.36%	478	2.63%		
Valid votes	22,494	85.51%	18,199	97.04%		
Null votes	3,812	14.49%	555	2.96%		
Seats					2	=
Turnout	26,306	78.00%	18,754	55.61%		
Abstentions	7,419	22.00%	14,971	44.39%		
Registered voters	33,725		33,725			
Source: National Independent Election Commission (CENI)

==== Magta Lahjar ====
Party	First round		Second round		Seats	±
Party	Votes	%	Votes	%	Seats	±
El Insaf	16,420	54.59%			2	=
El Vadila and El Karama	10,093	33.55%			0	=
National Rally for Reform and Development (Tewassoul)	1,525	5.07%			0	=
People's Progressive Alliance (APP)	1,432	4.76%			0	=
Sawab and allies (Sawab+)	274	0.91%			0	=
Blank votes	336	1.12%				
Valid votes	30,080	93.79%				
Null votes	1,992	6.21%				
Seats					2	=
Turnout	32,072	76.34%				
Abstentions	9,941	23.66%				
Registered voters	42,013					
Source: National Independent Election Commission (CENI)

==== Male ====
Party	First round		Second round		Seats	±
Party	Votes	%	Votes	%	Seats	±
El Insaf	9,383	56.05%			2	New
El Islah	3,487	20.83%			0	New
National Rally for Reform and Development (Tewassoul)	2,161	12.91%			0	New
People's Progressive Alliance (APP)	822	4.91%			0	New
Sawab and allies (Sawab+)	357	2.13%			0	New
Union for Democracy and Progress (UDP)	288	1.72%			0	New
Blank votes	243	1.45%				
Valid votes	16,741	87.23%				
Null votes	2,451	12.77%				
Seats					2	+2
Turnout	19,192	77.32%				
Abstentions	5,629	22.68%				
Registered voters	24,821					
Source: National Independent Election Commission (CENI)

==== M'Bagne ====
Party	First round		Second round		Seats	±
Party	Votes	%	Votes	%	Seats	±
El Insaf	4,521	34.98%	7,162	58.53%	2	=
Union for Democracy and Progress (UDP)	3,470	26.85%	4,569	37.34%	0	=
Alliance for Justice and Democracy/Movement for Renewal and allies (AJD/MR+)	1,701	13.16%			0	New
El Islah	1,286	9.95%			0	New
National Rally for Reform and Development (Tewassoul)	1,186	9.18%			0	=
Sawab and allies (Sawab+)	260	2.01%			0	=
Party of Conciliation and Prosperity (HIWAR)	217	1.68%			0	New
Blank votes	285	2.19%	505	4.13%		
Valid votes	12,926	76.56%	12,236	96.71%		
Null votes	3,958	23.44%	416	3.29%		
Seats					2	=
Turnout	16,884	75.45%	12,652	56.54%		
Abstentions	5,493	24.55%	9,725	43.46%		
Registered voters	22,377		22,377			
Source: National Independent Election Commission (CENI)

=== Dakhlet Nouadhibou ===
==== Chami ====
Party	First round		Second round		Seats	±
Party	Votes	%	Votes	%	Seats	±
El Insaf	3,727	68.26%			1	=
National Rally for Reform and Development (Tewassoul)	735	13.46%			0	=
National Democratic Alliance (AND)	401	7.34%			0	=
Sawab and allies (Sawab+)	245	4.49%			0	=
Rally of Democratic Forces (RFD)	69	1.26%			0	New
Alliance for Justice and Democracy/Movement for Renewal and allies (AJD/MR+)	55	1.01%			0	New
Party of Unity and Development (PUD)	32	0.59%			0	New
Blank votes	196	3.59%				
Valid votes	5,460	86.78%				
Null votes	832	13.22%				
Seats					1	=
Turnout	6,292	58.97%				
Abstentions	4,377	41.03%				
Registered voters	10,669					
Source: National Independent Election Commission (CENI)

==== Nouadhibou ====
Party	Votes	%	Seats	±
El Karama	5,853	16.69%	1	=
El Insaf	5,817	16.64%	1	=
National Rally for Reform and Development (Tewassoul)	2,819	8.06%	1	=
Alliance for Justice and Democracy/Movement for Renewal and allies (AJD/MR+)	2,363	6.76%	1	=
Sawab and allies (Sawab+)	2,012	5.76%	0	=
Union of the Forces of Progress and Rally of Democratic Forces (UFP-RFD)	1,966	5.62%	0	=
Republican Front for Unity and Democracy and allies (Hope Mauritania)	1,710	4.89%	0	New
Union for Democracy and Progress (UDP)	1,449	4.15%	0	=
Republican Party for Democracy and Renewal (PRDR)	1,434	4.10%	0	New
Mauritanian Party of Union and Change (HATEM)	1,192	3.41%	0	New
National Cohesion for Rights and the Construction of Generations (Ribat)	1,169	3.34%	0	=
El Islah	920	2.63%	0	=
National Democratic Alliance (AND)	911	2.61%	0	=
Party of Conciliation and Prosperity (HIWAR)	861	2.46%	0	New
Burst of Youth for the Nation (PSJN)	842	2.41%	0	=
El Ravah	664	1.90%	0	=
People's Progressive Alliance (APP)	550	1.57%	0	=
Party of Unity and Development (PUD)	334	0.96%	0	=
Union for Planning and Building and allies (State of Justice)	332	0.95%	0	New
Party of Construction and Progress (PCP)	291	0.83%	0	New
Centre through Action for Progress (CAP)	198	0.57%	0	New
Party of the Mauritanian Masses (PMM)	149	0.43%	0	=
El Vadila	140	0.40%	0	=
Nida El Watan	120	0.34%	0	New
Blank votes	879	2.51%		
Valid votes	34,957	87.53%		
Null votes	4,979	12.47%		
Seats			4	=
Turnout	39,936	71.63%		
Abstentions	15,818	28.37%		
Registered voters	55,754			
Source: National Independent Election Commission (CENI)

=== Gorgol ===
==== Kaédi ====
Party	Votes	%	Seats	±
El Insaf	5,915	26.16%	1	-1
Union for Democracy and Progress (UDP)	3,061	13.54%	1	=
Alliance for Justice and Democracy/Movement for Renewal and allies (AJD/MR+)	2,568	11.36%	1	+1
National Rally for Reform and Development (Tewassoul)	2,464	10.90%	0	n/a
National Democratic Alliance (AND)	1,983	8.77%	0	-1
Republican Front for Unity and Democracy and allies (Hope Mauritania)	1,186	5.25%	0	New
Burst of Youth for the Nation (PSJN)	1,139	5.04%	0	=
Sawab and allies (Sawab+)	882	3.90%	0	=
El Islah	799	3.53%	0	New
Union of the Forces of Progress (UFP)	555	2.45%	0	=
Party of Conciliation and Prosperity (HIWAR)	384	1.70%	0	New
People's Progressive Alliance (APP)	348	1.54%	0	=
Centre through Action for Progress (CAP)	284	1.26%	0	New
El Karama	223	0.99%	0	=
El Vadila	206	0.91%	0	New
Party of Unity and Development (PUD)	157	0.69%	0	New
Mauritanian Party of Union and Change (HATEM)	102	0.45%	0	n/a
National Cohesion for Rights and the Construction of Generations (Ribat)	46	0.20%	0	New
Blank votes	305	1.36%		
Valid votes	22,607	84.73%		
Null votes	4,075	15.27%		
Seats			3	-1
Turnout	26,682	74.56%		
Abstentions	9,103	25.44%		
Registered voters	35,785			
Source: National Independent Election Commission (CENI)

==== Lexeiba ====
Party	First round		Second round		Seats	±
Party	Votes	%	Votes	%	Seats	±
El Insaf	4,060	43.23%	5,579	65.18%	1	New
Union for Democracy and Progress (UDP)	2,361	25.14%	2,709	31.65%	0	New
National Rally for Reform and Development (Tewassoul)	1,493	15.90%			0	New
Alliance for Justice and Democracy/Movement for Renewal and allies (AJD/MR+)	685	7.29%			0	New
El Karama	286	3.05%			0	New
National Cohesion for Rights and the Construction of Generations (Ribat)	150	1.60%			0	New
Sawab and allies (Sawab+)	72	0.77%			0	New
Mauritanian Party of Union and Change (HATEM)	47	0.50%			0	New
Blank votes	237	2.52%	271	3.17%		
Valid votes	9,391	85.15%	8,559	97.33%		
Null votes	1,638	14.85%	235	2.67%		
Seats					1	+1
Turnout	11,029	75.46%	8,794	60.17%		
Abstentions	3,587	24.54%	5,822	39.83%		
Registered voters	14,616		14,616			
Source: National Independent Election Commission (CENI)

==== Maghama ====
Party	First round		Second round		Seats	±
Party	Votes	%	Votes	%	Seats	±
El Insaf	6,959	45.54%	8,309	58.75%	2	=
Union for Democracy and Progress (UDP)	4,520	29.58%	5,189	36.69%	0	=
El Ravah and Party of Unity and Development (El Ravah-PUD)	1,839	12.03%			0	New
Union of the Forces of Progress (UFP)	839	5.49%			0	New
Nida El Watan	331	2.17%			0	New
Sawab and allies (Sawab+)	194	1.27%			0	New
Alliance for Justice and Democracy/Movement for Renewal and allies (AJD/MR+)	121	0.79%			0	=
El Vadila	73	0.48%			0	New
Blank votes	405	2.65%	646	4.56%		
Valid votes	15,281	84.03%	14,144	97.50%		
Null votes	2,904	15.97%	363	2.50%		
Seats					2	=
Turnout	18,185	81.39%	14,507	64.93%		
Abstentions	4,159	18.61%	7,837	35.07%		
Registered voters	22,344		22,344			
Source: National Independent Election Commission (CENI)

==== M'Bout ====
Party	Votes	%	Seats	±
El Insaf	8,455	30.07%	1	=
El Karama	8,403	29.89%	1	=
National Democratic Alliance (AND)	3,319	11.81%	1	+1
Sawab and allies (Sawab+)	1,779	6.33%	0	=
Burst of Youth for the Nation (PSJN)	1,659	5.90%	0	=
Union for Democracy and Progress (UDP)	1,306	4.65%	0	-1
Party of Conciliation and Prosperity (HIWAR)	930	3.31%	0	New
Union of the Forces of Progress (UFP)	870	3.09%	0	=
National Rally for Reform and Development (Tewassoul)	476	1.69%	0	=
El Vadila	207	0.74%	0	=
El Islah	199	0.71%	0	New
People's Progressive Alliance (APP)	168	0.60%	0	New
Alliance for Justice and Democracy/Movement for Renewal and allies (AJD/MR+)	46	0.16%	0	=
National Cohesion for Rights and the Construction of Generations (Ribat)	45	0.16%	0	New
Blank votes	252	0.89%		
Valid votes	28,114	86.02%		
Null votes	4,568	13.98%		
Seats			3	=
Turnout	32,682	76.48%		
Abstentions	10,051	23.52%		
Registered voters	42,733			
Source: National Independent Election Commission (CENI)

==== Monguel ====
Party	First round		Second round		Seats	±
Party	Votes	%	Votes	%	Seats	±
El Insaf	6,872	47.04%	6,959	50.17%	2	=
Union for Democracy and Progress (UDP)	5,354	36.65%	6,396	46.11%	0	=
Republican Party for Democracy and Renewal and Union of the Forces of Progress (PRDR-UFP)	1,950	13.35%			0	=
Alliance for Justice and Democracy/Movement for Renewal and allies (AJD/MR+)	250	1.71%			0	=
Party of Construction and Progress (PCP)	63	0.43%			0	New
Blank votes	120	0.82%	517	3.72%		
Valid votes	14,609	92.18%	13,872	98.40%		
Null votes	1,239	7.82%	226	1.60%		
Seats					2	=
Turnout	15,848	79.19%	14,098	70.44%		
Abstentions	4,165	20.81%	5,915	29.56%		
Registered voters	20,013		20,013			
Source: National Independent Election Commission (CENI)

=== Guidimaka ===
==== Ghabou ====
Party	First round		Second round		Seats	±
Party	Votes	%	Votes	%	Seats	±
Union for Democracy and Progress (UDP)	3,890	25.00%	7,329	51.53%	2	+2
El Insaf	3,808	24.47%	6,237	43.85%	0	-2
National Democratic Alliance (AND)	2,235	14.36%			0	New
Sawab and allies (Sawab+)	1,909	12.27%			0	=
National Rally for Reform and Development (Tewassoul)	1,552	9.97%			0	=
El Vadila	1,205	7.74%			0	New
People's Progressive Alliance (APP)	284	1.82%			0	=
El Karama	141	0.91%			0	New
Alliance for Justice and Democracy/Movement for Renewal and allies (AJD/MR+)	86	0.55%			0	=
National Cohesion for Rights and the Construction of Generations (Ribat)	39	0.25%			0	New
Blank votes	413	2.66%	658	4.62%		
Valid votes	15,562	82.51%	14,224	93.99%		
Null votes	3,298	17.49%	909	6.01%		
Seats					2	=
Turnout	18,860	82.71%	15,133	66.37%		
Abstentions	3,942	17,29%	7,669	33.63%		
Registered voters	22,802		22,802			
Source: National Independent Election Commission (CENI)

==== Ould Yengé ====
Party	First round		Second round		Seats	±
Party	Votes	%	Votes	%	Seats	±
Union for Democracy and Progress (UDP)	7,844	42.50%	11,088	58.76%	2	+2
El Insaf	5,347	28.97%	6,982	37.00%	0	-2
Sawab and allies (Sawab+)	2,969	16.09%			0	=
National Rally for Reform and Development (Tewassoul)	653	3.54%			0	=
El Islah	334	1.81%			0	New
National Cohesion for Rights and the Construction of Generations (Ribat)	251	1.36%			0	New
Alliance for Justice and Democracy/Movement for Renewal and allies (AJD/MR+)	245	1.33%			0	=
Blank votes	820	4.40%	801	4.24%		
Valid votes	18,457	80.14%	18,871	97.29%		
Null votes	4,574	19.86%	525	2.71%		
Seats					2	=
Turnout	23,031	81.73%	19,396	68.83%		
Abstentions	5,149	18.27%	8,784	31.17%		
Registered voters	28,180		28,180			
Source: National Independent Election Commission (CENI)

==== Sélibaby ====
Party	First round		Second round		Seats	±
Party	Votes	%	Votes	%	Seats	±
El Insaf	6,847	37.28%	8,269	50.07%	2	+1
Union for Democracy and Progress (UDP)	4,622	25.16%	7,532	45.60%	0	-1
Sawab and allies (Sawab+)	2,614	14.23%			0	=
National Rally for Reform and Development (Tewassoul)	1,888	10.28%			0	-1
People's Progressive Alliance, Republican Front for Unity and Democracy and allies (APP-FRUD+)	806	4.39%			0	=
National Democratic Alliance (AND)	349	1.90%			0	=
Party of the Mauritanian Masses (PMM)	197	1.07%			0	New
El Karama	190	1.03%			0	New
National Cohesion for Rights and the Construction of Generations (Ribat)	131	0.71%			0	New
Alliance for Justice and Democracy/Movement for Renewal and allies (AJD/MR+)	128	0.70%			0	=
El Vadila	103	0.56%			0	=
Union for Planning and Building and allies (State of Justice)	60	0.33%			0	New
Blank votes	432	2.36%	715	4.33%		
Valid votes	18,367	90.66%	16,516	97.54%		
Null votes	1,893	9.34%	416	2.46%		
Seats					2	-1
Turnout	20,260	78.38%	16,932	65.51%		
Abstentions	5,588	21.62%	8,916	34.49%		
Registered voters	25,848		25,848			
Source: National Independent Election Commission (CENI)

==== Wompou ====
Party	First round		Second round		Seats	±
Party	Votes	%	Votes	%	Seats	±
El Insaf	3,947	35.75%	5,757	57.91%	2	New
Union for Democracy and Progress (UDP)	3,297	29.86%	3,747	37.69%	0	New
National Democratic Alliance (AND)	1,810	16.39%			0	New
Sawab and allies (Sawab+)	756	6.85%			0	New
El Karama	432	3.91%			0	New
National Rally for Reform and Development (Tewassoul)	344	3.12%			0	New
Union of the Forces of Progress (UFP)	244	2.21%			0	New
Alliance for Justice and Democracy/Movement for Renewal and allies (AJD/MR+)	92	0.83%			0	New
National Cohesion for Rights and the Construction of Generations (Ribat)	25	0.23%			0	New
Blank votes	95	0.85%	437	4.40%		
Valid votes	11,042	87.70%	9,941	98.22%		
Null votes	1,549	12.30%	180	1.78%		
Seats					2	+2
Turnout	12,591	83.96%	10,121	67.49%		
Abstentions	2,405	16.04%	4,875	32.51%		
Registered voters	14,996		14,996			
Source: National Independent Election Commission (CENI)

=== Hodh Ech Chargui ===
==== Adel Begrou ====
Party	First round		Second round		Seats	±
Party	Votes	%	Votes	%	Seats	±
El Insaf	6,468	54.73%			2	New
Union for Democracy and Progress (UDP)	4,575	38.71%			0	New
Sawab and allies (Sawab+)	483	4.09%			0	New
Blank votes	293	2.47%				
Valid votes	11,819	86.99%				
Null votes	1,768	13.01%				
Seats					2	+2
Turnout	13,587	72.57%				
Abstentions	5,136	27.43%				
Registered voters	18,723					
Source: National Independent Election Commission (CENI)

==== Amourj ====
Party	First round		Second round		Seats	±
Party	Votes	%	Votes	%	Seats	±
El Insaf	7,611	50.70%			2	+1
El Islah	5,079	33.83%			0	=
National Democratic Alliance (AND)	1,706	11.36%			0	=
Sawab and allies (Sawab+)	194	1.29%			0	=
Union for Planning and Building, allies and People's Progressive Alliance (UPC+-APP)	182	1.21%			0	=
Blank votes	241	1.61%				
Valid votes	15,013	84.59%				
Null votes	2,736	15.41%				
Seats					2	-1
Turnout	17,749	78.02%				
Abstentions	5,000	21.98%				
Registered voters	22,749					
Source: National Independent Election Commission (CENI)

==== Bassiknou ====
Party	First round		Second round		Seats	±
Party	Votes	%	Votes	%	Seats	±
El Insaf	9,579	65.60%			2	=
Mauritanian Party of Union and Change (HATEM)	3,853	26.39%			0	New
Burst of Youth for the Nation (PSJN)	333	2.28%			0	New
Sawab and allies (Sawab+)	296	2.03%			0	New
People's Progressive Alliance (APP)	219	1.50%			0	=
Blank votes	322	2.20%				
Valid votes	14,602	71.94%				
Null votes	5,696	28.06%				
Seats					2	=
Turnout	20,298	78.99%				
Abstentions	5,398	21.01%				
Registered voters	25,696					
Source: National Independent Election Commission (CENI)

==== Djigueni ====
Party	First round		Second round		Seats	±
Party	Votes	%	Votes	%	Seats	±
El Insaf	9,883	48.32%	11,987	54.60%	2	=
Mauritanian Party of Union and Change (HATEM)	7,409	36.22%	9,168	41.76%	0	New
Union for Democracy and Progress (UDP)	1,873	9.16%			0	=
National Rally for Reform and Development (Tewassoul)	423	2.07%			0	=
Union of the Forces of Progress (UFP)	215	1.05%			0	New
National Cohesion for Rights and the Construction of Generations (Ribat)	147	0.72%			0	New
Sawab and allies (Sawab+)	104	0.51%			0	=
Blank votes	401	1.95%	800	3.64%		
Valid votes	20,455	83.02%	21,955	97.66%		
Null votes	4,184	16.98%	526	2.34%		
Seats					2	=
Turnout	24,639	82.39%	22,481	75.18%		
Abstentions	5,265	17.61%	7,423	24.82%		
Registered voters	29,904		29,904			
Source: National Independent Election Commission (CENI)

==== N'beiket Lahwach ====
Party	First round		Second round		Seats	±
Party	Votes	%	Votes	%	Seats	±
El Insaf	3,206	52.05%			1	=
Union for Democracy and Progress (UDP)	2,823	45.84%			0	New
National Democratic Alliance (AND)	48	0.78%			0	=
El Vadila	32	0.52%			0	New
Blank votes	50	0.81%				
Valid votes	6,159	95.05%				
Null votes	321	4.95%				
Seats					1	=
Turnout	6,480	76.26%				
Abstentions	2,017	23.74%				
Registered voters	8,497					
Source: National Independent Election Commission (CENI)

==== Néma ====
Party	First round		Second round		Seats	±
Party	Votes	%	Votes	%	Seats	±
El Insaf	17,313	68.41%			2	=
National Rally for Reform and Development (Tewassoul)	3,477	13.74%			0	=
National Democratic Alliance (AND)	614	2.43%			0	=
El Karama	593	2.34%			0	New
El Vadila	567	2.24%			0	New
El Ravah	565	2.23%			0	=
People's Progressive Alliance (APP)	563	2.22%			0	=
Sawab and allies (Sawab+)	445	1.76%			0	New
Party of Unity and Development (PUD)	349	1.38%			0	New
Blank votes	821	3.25%				
Valid votes	25,307	77.24%				
Null votes	7,456	22.76%				
Seats					2	=
Turnout	32,763	72.50%				
Abstentions	12,428	27.50%				
Registered voters	45,191					
Source: National Independent Election Commission (CENI)

==== Oualata ====
Party	First round		Second round		Seats	±
Party	Votes	%	Votes	%	Seats	±
El Insaf	2,468	45.09%	3,329	55.33%	1	=
El Islah	955	17.45%	2,494	41.45%	0	=
Rally of Democratic Forces (RFD)	880	16.08%			0	New
Nida El Watan	535	9.77%			0	New
El Ravah	520	9.50%			0	New
El Karama	34	0.62%			0	New
Blank votes	82	1.49%	194	3.22%		
Valid votes	5,474	88.45%	6,017	97.93%		
Null votes	715	11.55%	127	2.07%		
Seats					1	=
Turnout	6,189	69.93%	6,144	69.42%		
Abstentions	2,661	30.07%	2,706	30.58%		
Registered voters	8,850		8,850			
Source: National Independent Election Commission (CENI)

==== Timbédra ====
Party	First round		Second round		Seats	±
Party	Votes	%	Votes	%	Seats	±
El Insaf	14,611	53.47%			2	=
Union for Democracy and Progress (UDP)	10,765	39.39%			0	New
National Rally for Reform and Development (Tewassoul)	1,045	3.82%			0	=
Rally of Democratic Forces (RFD)	522	1.91%			0	=
Sawab and allies (Sawab+)	172	0.63%			0	New
Blank votes	212	0.78%				
Valid votes	27,327	89.71%				
Null votes	3,135	10.29%				
Seats					2	=
Turnout	30,462	79.14%				
Abstentions	8,027	20.86%				
Registered voters	38,489					
Source: National Independent Election Commission (CENI)

=== Hodh El Gharbi ===
==== Aïoun El Atrous ====
Party	First round		Second round		Seats	±
Party	Votes	%	Votes	%	Seats	±
El Insaf	17,395	68.92%			2	=
Mauritanian Party of Union and Change (HATEM)	6,610	26.19%			0	=
Sawab and allies (Sawab+)	646	2.56%			0	New
Rally of Democratic Forces (RFD)	197	0.78%			0	New
Blank votes	393	1.55%				
Valid votes	25,241	87.81%				
Null votes	3,503	12.19%				
Seats					2	=
Turnout	28,744	74.79%				
Abstentions	9,688	25.21%				
Registered voters	38,432					
Source: National Independent Election Commission (CENI)

==== Koubenni ====
Party	Votes	%	Seats	±
El Insaf	7,801	26.78%	1	-2
Union for Democracy and Progress (UDP)	7,344	25.21%	1	+1
Nida El Watan	4,159	14.28%	1	New
National Rally for Reform and Development (Tewassoul)	3,684	12.65%	0	=
Party of the Mauritanian Masses (PMM)	3,153	10.82%	0	=
El Islah	2,025	6.95%	0	New
Party of Unity and Development (PUD)	333	1.14%	0	New
El Ravah	220	0.76%	0	New
Party of Construction and Progress (PCP)	118	0.41%	0	New
National Cohesion for Rights and the Construction of Generations (Ribat)	86	0.30%	0	New
Blank votes	206	0.70%		
Valid votes	29,129	85.63%		
Null votes	4,888	14.37%		
Seats			3	=
Turnout	34,017	83.85%		
Abstentions	6,499	16.15%		
Registered voters	40,570			
Source: National Independent Election Commission (CENI)

==== Tamchekett ====
Party	First round		Second round		Seats	±
Party	Votes	%	Votes	%	Seats	±
El Insaf	8,606	72.54%			2	=
National Rally for Reform and Development (Tewassoul)	1,888	15.91%			0	=
Mauritanian Party of Union and Change (HATEM)	1,148	9.68%			0	New
Blank votes	222	1.87%				
Valid votes	11,864	75.19%				
Null votes	3,915	24.81%				
Seats					2	=
Turnout	15,779	77.27%				
Abstentions	4,642	22.73%				
Registered voters	20,421					
Source: National Independent Election Commission (CENI)

==== Tintane ====
Party	First round		Second round		Seats	±
Party	Votes	%	Votes	%	Seats	±
El Insaf	15,680	56.99%			2	=
El Islah	7,470	27.15%			0	New
National Rally for Reform and Development (Tewassoul)	3,834	13.94%			0	=
Blank votes	529	1.92%				
Valid votes	27,513	90.65%				
Null votes	2,837	9.35%				
Seats					2	=
Turnout	30,350	73.74%				
Abstentions	10,806	26.26%				
Registered voters	41,156					
Source: National Independent Election Commission (CENI)

==== Touil ====
Party	First round		Second round		Seats	±
Party	Votes	%	Votes	%	Seats	±
Union for Democracy and Progress (UDP)	2,805	35.94%	4,014	45.11%	0	New
Nida El Watan	2,526	32.36%	4,388	49.31%	1	New
El Insaf	2,360	30.24%			0	New
Sawab and allies (Sawab+)	54	0.69%			0	New
Blank votes	80	0.77%	497	5.59%		
Valid votes	7,805	84.22%	8,899	98.03%		
Null votes	1,462	15.78%	179	1.97%		
Seats					1	+1
Turnout	9,267	79.35%	9,078	77.74%		
Abstentions	2,411	20.65%	2,600	22.26%		
Registered voters	11,678		11,678			
Source: National Independent Election Commission (CENI)

=== Inchiri ===
==== Akjoujt ====
Party	First round		Second round		Seats	±
Party	Votes	%	Votes	%	Seats	±
El Insaf	3,501	69.85%			1	=
Union of the Forces of Progress, Alliance for Justice and Democracy/Movement for Renewal, allies and Rally of Democratic Forces (UFP–AJD/MR+-RFD)	480	9.58%			0	New
Sawab and allies (Sawab+)	343	6.84%			0	=
National Cohesion for Rights and the Construction of Generations (Ribat)	197	3.93%			0	=
El Islah	153	3.05%			0	=
Blank votes	338	6.75%				
Valid votes	5,012	84.78%				
Null votes	900	15.22%				
Seats					1	=
Turnout	5,912	70.58%				
Abstentions	2,464	29.42%				
Registered voters	8,376					
Source: National Independent Election Commission (CENI)

==== Bénichab ====
Party	First round		Second round		Seats	±
Party	Votes	%	Votes	%	Seats	±
El Insaf	3,539	65.32%			1	=
National Cohesion for Rights and the Construction of Generations (Ribat)	1,216	22.44%			0	New
Sawab and allies (Sawab+)	247	4.56%			0	New
Rally of Democratic Forces (RFD)	237	4.37%			0	=
Blank votes	179	3.31%				
Valid votes	5,418	88.28%				
Null votes	719	11.72%				
Seats					1	=
Turnout	6,137	53.77%				
Abstentions	5,276	46.23%				
Registered voters	11,413					
Source: National Independent Election Commission (CENI)

=== Nouakchott ===
==== Nouakchott-Nord ====
Party	Votes	%	Seats	±
El Insaf	17,473	27.57%	2	New
National Rally for Reform and Development (Tewassoul)	9,644	15.21%	1	New
National Democratic Alliance (AND)	4,073	6.43%	1	New
Sawab and allies (Sawab+)	3,132	4.94%	1	New
Republican Front for Unity and Democracy and allies (Hope Mauritania)	2,778	4.38%	1	New
Union for Democracy and Progress (UDP)	2,711	4.28%	1	New
El Islah	2,424	3.82%	0	New
Union for Planning and Building and allies (State of Justice)	1,550	2.45%	0	New
Party of Unity and Development (PUD)	1,523	2.40%	0	New
National Cohesion for Rights and the Construction of Generations (Ribat)	1,511	2.38%	0	New
Rally of Democratic Forces (RFD)	1,443	2.28%	0	New
El Ravah	1,415	2.23%	0	New
Party of Construction and Progress (PCP)	1,365	2.15%	0	New
Party of the Mauritanian Masses (PMM)	1,225	1.93%	0	New
Republican Party for Democracy and Renewal (PRDR)	1,202	1.90%	0	New
People's Progressive Alliance (APP)	1,167	1.84%	0	New
El Vadila	1,157	1.83%	0	New
Union of the Forces of Progress (UFP)	1,133	1.79%	0	New
Mauritanian Party of Union and Change (HATEM)	912	1.44%	0	New
Burst of Youth for the Nation (PSJN)	905	1.43%	0	New
El Karama	785	1.24%	0	New
Party of Conciliation and Prosperity (HIWAR)	690	1.09%	0	New
Nida El Watan	659	1.04%	0	New
Alliance for Justice and Democracy/Movement for Renewal and allies (AJD/MR+)	619	0.98%	0	New
Centre through Action for Progress (CAP)	458	0.72%	0	New
Blank votes	1,432	2.26%		
Valid votes	63,386	86.26%		
Null votes	10,093	13.74%		
Seats			7	+7
Turnout	73,479	61.04%		
Abstentions	46,908	38.96%		
Registered voters	120,387			
Source: National Independent Election Commission (CENI)

==== Nouakchott-Ouest ====
Party	Votes	%	Seats	±
El Insaf	18,366	24.62%	2	New
National Rally for Reform and Development (Tewassoul)	7,736	10.37%	1	New
Republican Front for Unity and Democracy and allies (Hope Mauritania)	4,485	6.01%	1	New
El Islah	4,224	5.66%	1	New
Union for Planning and Building, allies and El Vadila (UPC+-El Vadila)	4,130	5.54%	1	New
National Democratic Alliance (AND)	3,557	4.77%	1	New
Sawab and allies (Sawab+)	2,756	3.69%	0	New
Nida El Watan	2,736	3.67%	0	New
Party of Unity and Development (PUD)	2,702	3.62%	0	New
Union for Democracy and Progress (UDP)	2,416	3.24%	0	New
Rally of Democratic Forces (RFD)	2,358	3.16%	0	New
Alliance for Justice and Democracy/Movement for Renewal and allies (AJD/MR+)	2,333	3.13%	0	New
Mauritanian Party of Union and Change (HATEM)	2,096	2.81%	0	New
Union of the Forces of Progress (UFP)	2,002	2.68%	0	New
National Cohesion for Rights and the Construction of Generations (Ribat)	1,576	2.11%	0	New
El Karama	1,539	2.06%	0	New
Party of Construction and Progress (PCP)	1,428	1.91%	0	New
Party of the Mauritanian Masses (PMM)	1,289	1.73%	0	New
Centre through Action for Progress (CAP)	1,214	1.63%	0	New
El Ravah	1,191	1.60%	0	New
People's Progressive Alliance (APP)	654	0.88%	0	New
Burst of Youth for the Nation (PSJN)	541	0.73%	0	New
Republican Party for Democracy and Renewal (PRDR)	531	0.71%	0	New
Party of Conciliation and Prosperity (HIWAR)	420	0.56%	0	New
Blank votes	2,327	3.11%		
Valid votes	74,607	86.40%		
Null votes	11,748	13.60%		
Seats			7	+7
Turnout	86,355	60.85%		
Abstentions	55,559	39.15%		
Registered voters	141,914			
Source: National Independent Election Commission (CENI)

==== Nouakchott-Sud ====
Party	Votes	%	Seats	±
El Insaf	25,844	37.74%	3	New
National Rally for Reform and Development (Tewassoul)	9,979	14.57%	1	New
Republican Front for Unity and Democracy and allies (Hope Mauritania)	5,281	7.71%	1	New
Sawab and allies (Sawab+)	3,379	4.93%	1	New
El Karama	2,880	4.21%	1	New
Alliance for Justice and Democracy/Movement for Renewal and allies (AJD/MR+)	2,334	3.41%	0	New
El Islah	2,151	3.14%	0	New
People's Progressive Alliance (APP)	1,774	2.59%	0	New
National Democratic Alliance (AND)	1,510	2.20%	0	New
Mauritanian Party of Union and Change (HATEM)	1,460	2.13%	0	New
Nida El Watan	1,437	2.10%	0	New
Union for Democracy and Progress (UDP)	1,378	2.01%	0	New
Union of the Forces of Progress (UFP)	1,258	1.84%	0	New
Union for Planning and Building and allies (State of Justice)	1,051	1.53%	0	New
Centre through Action for Progress (CAP)	711	1.04%	0	New
El Ravah	689	1.01%	0	New
National Cohesion for Rights and the Construction of Generations (Ribat)	595	0.87%	0	New
El Vadila	495	0.72%	0	New
Rally of Democratic Forces (RFD)	478	0.70%	0	New
Party of the Mauritanian Masses (PMM)	472	0.69%	0	New
Party of Unity and Development (PUD)	448	0.65%	0	New
Party of Construction and Progress (PCP)	445	0.65%	0	New
Party of Conciliation and Prosperity (HIWAR)	387	0.57%	0	New
Burst of Youth for the Nation (PSJN)	282	0.41%	0	New
Blank votes	1,767	2.58%		
Valid votes	68,485	86.10%		
Null votes	11,053	13.90%		
Seats			7	+7
Turnout	79,538	66.63%		
Abstentions	39,829	33.37%		
Registered voters	119,367			
Source: National Independent Election Commission (CENI)

=== Tagant ===
==== Moudjéria ====
Party	First round		Second round		Seats	±
Party	Votes	%	Votes	%	Seats	±
El Insaf	13,657	70.06%			2	=
El Ravah	4,012	20.58%			0	New
El Islah	694	3.56%			0	New
Sawab, allies and National Rally for Reform and Development (Sawab+-Tewassoul)	658	3.38%			0	=
National Cohesion for Rights and the Construction of Generations (Ribat)	93	0.48%			0	New
Blank votes	379	1.94%				
Valid votes	19,493	92.70%				
Null votes	1,535	7.30%				
Seats					2	=
Turnout	21,028	74.50%				
Abstentions	7,196	25.50%				
Registered voters	28,224					
Source: National Independent Election Commission (CENI)

==== Tichitt ====
Party	First round		Second round		Seats	±
Party	Votes	%	Votes	%	Seats	±
El Insaf	1,884	54.67%			1	=
El Islah	1,467	42.57%			0	=
Blank votes	95	2.76%				
Valid votes	3,446	92.16%				
Null votes	293	7.84%				
Seats					1	=
Turnout	3,739	75.25%				
Abstentions	1,230	24.75%				
Registered voters	4,969					
Source: National Independent Election Commission (CENI)

==== Tidjikja ====
Party	First round		Second round		Seats	±
Party	Votes	%	Votes	%	Seats	±
El Insaf	9,792	63.30%			2	=
Union for Democracy and Progress (UDP)	2,482	16.05%			0	New
El Islah	1,371	8.86%			0	New
National Rally for Reform and Development (Tewassoul)	1,283	8.29%			0	New
People's Progressive Alliance (APP)	343	2.22%			0	=
Blank votes	197	0.98%				
Valid votes	15,468	92.24%				
Null votes	1,302	7.76%				
Seats					2	=
Turnout	16,770	74.06%				
Abstentions	5,873	25.94%				
Registered voters	22,643					
Source: National Independent Election Commission (CENI)

=== Tiris Zemmour ===
==== Bir Moghrein ====
Party	First round		Second round		Seats	±
Party	Votes	%	Votes	%	Seats	±
El Islah	1,659	64.63%			1	New
El Insaf	812	31.63%			0	-1
Sawab and allies (Sawab+)	28	1.09%			0	New
Blank votes	68	2.65%				
Valid votes	2,567	93.28%				
Null votes	185	6.72%				
Seats					1	=
Turnout	2,752	69.83%				
Abstentions	1,189	30.17%				
Registered voters	3,941					
Source: National Independent Election Commission (CENI)

==== F'Déirick ====
Party	First round		Second round		Seats	±
Party	Votes	%	Votes	%	Seats	±
El Insaf	1,927	62.16%			1	=
Mauritanian Party of Union and Change (HATEM)	759	24.48%			0	New
Sawab, allies and People's Progressive Alliance (Sawab+-APP)	123	3.97%			0	New
El Ravah	115	3.71%			0	New
National Cohesion for Rights and the Construction of Generations (Ribat)	93	3.00%			0	New
Blank votes	83	2.68%				
Valid votes	3,100	90.12				
Null votes	340	9.88%				
Seats					1	=
Turnout	3,440	78.11%				
Abstentions	964	21.89%				
Registered voters	4,404					
Source: National Independent Election Commission (CENI)

==== Zouérate ====
Party	First round		Second round		Seats	±
Party	Votes	%	Votes	%	Seats	±
El Insaf	5,308	42.31%	6,736	53.17%	2	=
People's Progressive Alliance, Republican Front for Unity and Democracy and allies (APP-FRUD+)	2,229	17.77%	5,708	45.05%	0	New
Sawab, allies and National Rally for Reform and Development (Sawab+-Tewassoul)	1,997	15.92%			0	New
Union for Democracy and Progress (UDP)	994	7.92%			0	New
El Islah	792	6.31%			0	New
Union of the Forces of Progress, Alliance for Justice and Democracy/Movement for Renewal and allies (UFP-AJD/MR+)	546	4.35%			0	New
National Cohesion for Rights and the Construction of Generations (Ribat)	263	2.10%			0	New
National Democratic Alliance (AND)	134	1.07%			0	=
Blank votes	283	2.25%	225	1.78%		
Valid votes	12,546	90.19%	12,669	97.39%		
Null votes	1,331	9.81%	340	2.61%		
Seats					2	=
Turnout	13,910	69.96%	13,009	65.58%		
Abstentions	5,927	30.04%	6,828	34.42%		
Registered voters	19,837		19,837			
Source: National Independent Election Commission (CENI)

=== Trarza ===
==== Boutilimit ====
Party	First round		Second round		Seats	±
Party	Votes	%	Votes	%	Seats	±
El Insaf	21,738	71.80%			2	=
National Rally for Reform and Development (Tewassoul)	5,225	17.26%			0	=
Rally of Democratic Forces (RFD)	1,588	5.25%			0	=
Sawab and allies (Sawab+)	499	1.65%			0	New
National Democratic Alliance (AND)	402	1.33%			0	New
Republican Front for Unity and Democracy and allies (Hope Mauritania)	313	1.03%			0	New
Blank votes	509	1.68%				
Valid votes	30,274	91.92%				
Null votes	2,661	8.08%				
Seats					2	=
Turnout	32,935	66.50%				
Abstentions	16,589	33.50%				
Registered voters	49,524					
Source: National Independent Election Commission (CENI)

==== Keur Macène ====
Party	First round		Second round		Seats	±
Party	Votes	%	Votes	%	Seats	±
El Insaf	12,854	71.27%			2	=
National Rally for Reform and Development (Tewassoul)	2,565	14.22%			0	=
Sawab and allies (Sawab+)	1,293	7.17%			0	=
Rally of Democratic Forces (RFD)	458	2.54%			0	=
National Democratic Alliance (AND)	354	1.96%			0	New
Blank votes	511	2.84%				
Valid votes	18,035	90.40%				
Null votes	1,916	9.60%				
Seats					2	=
Turnout	19,951	69.71%				
Abstentions	8,669	30.29%				
Registered voters	28,620					
Source: National Independent Election Commission (CENI)

==== Méderdra ====
Party	First round		Second round		Seats	±
Party	Votes	%	Votes	%	Seats	±
El Insaf	10,345	65.70%			2	=
Rally of Democratic Forces and National Rally for Reform and Development (RFD-Tewassoul)	2,175	13.81%			0	=
Party of Conciliation and Prosperity (HIWAR)	1,137	7.22%			0	New
Sawab and allies (Sawab+)	819	5.20%			0	New
El Islah	699	4.44%			0	New
National Democratic Alliance (AND)	193	1.23%			0	New
Blank votes	378	2.40%				
Valid votes	15,746	89.72%				
Null votes	1,805	10.28%				
Seats					2	=
Turnout	17,551	71.43%				
Abstentions	7,019	28.57%				
Registered voters	24,570					
Source: National Independent Election Commission (CENI)

==== Ouad Naga ====
Party	First round		Second round		Seats	±
Party	Votes	%	Votes	%	Seats	±
El Insaf	20,330	70.54%			2	=
National Rally for Reform and Development (Tewassoul)	5,126	17.79%			0	=
El Islah	2,299	7.98%			0	New
National Democratic Alliance (AND)	312	1.08%			0	=
Blank votes	752	2.61%				
Valid votes	28,819	90.01%				
Null votes	3,197	9.99%				
Seats					2	=
Turnout	32,016	62.27%				
Abstentions	19,396	37.73%				
Registered voters	51,412					
Source: National Independent Election Commission (CENI)

==== R'Kiz ====
Party	First round		Second round		Seats	±
Party	Votes	%	Votes	%	Seats	±
El Insaf	11,334	66.04%			2	=
El Islah	2,501	14.57%			0	New
Sawab and allies (Sawab+)	1,122	6.54%			0	=
National Democratic Alliance (AND)	1,118	6.51%			0	=
People's Progressive Alliance (APP)	406	2.37%			0	=
National Cohesion for Rights and the Construction of Generations (Ribat)	313	1.82%			0	New
Blank votes	369	2.15%				
Valid votes	17,163	87.98%				
Null votes	2,345	12.02%				
Seats					2	=
Turnout	19,508	65.48%				
Abstentions	10,283	34.52%				
Registered voters	29,791					
Source: National Independent Election Commission (CENI)

==== Rosso ====
Party	First round		Second round		Seats	±
Party	Votes	%	Votes	%	Seats	±
El Insaf	7,821	41.30%	9,482	55.58%	2	=
Centre through Action for Progress (CAP)	5,671	29.95%	7,018	41.14%	0	New
Sawab and allies (Sawab+)	2,126	11.23%			0	=
Republican Front for Unity and Democracy and allies (Hope Mauritania)	756	3.99%			0	New
National Rally for Reform and Development (Tewassoul)	595	3.14%			0	=
People's Progressive Alliance (APP)	326	1.72%			0	=
El Ravah	302	1.59%			0	=
Rally of Democratic Forces (RFD)	230	1.21%			0	=
El Islah	217	1.15%			0	=
Party of Conciliation and Prosperity (HIWAR)	211	1.11%			0	New
National Democratic Alliance (AND)	178	0.94%			0	=
Alliance for Justice and Democracy/Movement for Renewal and allies (AJD/MR+)	148	0.78%			0	=
National Cohesion for Rights and the Construction of Generations (Ribat)	135	0.71%			0	New
Blank votes	222	1.18%	560	3.28%		
Valid votes	18,938	88.47%	17,060	97.18%		
Null votes	2,467	11.53%	495	2.82%		
Seats					2	=
Turnout	21,405	72.05%	17,555	59.09%		
Abstentions	8,305	27.95%	12,155	40.91%		
Registered voters	29,710		29,710			
Source: National Independent Election Commission (CENI)

==== Tékane ====
Party	First round		Second round		Seats	±
Party	Votes	%	Votes	%	Seats	±
El Insaf	8,977	61.01%			2	New
National Rally for Reform and Development, Sawab and allies (Tewassoul-Sawab+)	3,488	23.70%			0	New
Republican Front for Unity and Democracy and allies (Hope Mauritania)	1,389	9.44%			0	New
National Democratic Alliance (AND)	311	2.11%			0	New
Alliance for Justice and Democracy/Movement for Renewal and allies (AJD/MR+)	159	1.08%			0	New
Rally of Democratic Forces (RFD)	103	0.70%			0	New
Blank votes	288	1.96%				
Valid votes	14,715	87.47%				
Null votes	2,108	12.53%				
Seats					2	+2
Turnout	16,823	72.79%				
Abstentions	6,289	27.21%				
Registered voters	23,112					
Source: National Independent Election Commission (CENI)

=== Diaspora ===
==== Africa ====
Party	First round		Second round		Seats	±
Party	Votes	%	Votes	%	Seats	±
El Insaf	1,429	35.25%	2,180	55.19%	1	=
National Rally for Reform and Development (Tewassoul)	1,118	27.58%	1,723	43.62%	0	New
Sawab and allies (Sawab+)	1,034	25.51%			0	New
Mauritanian Party of Union and Change (HATEM)	351	8.66%			0	New
Rally of Democratic Forces (RFD)	66	1.63%			0	New
Blank votes	56	1.37%	47	1.19%		
Valid votes	4,054	91.41%	3,950	97.08%		
Null votes	381	8.59%	119	2.92%		
Seats					1	=
Turnout	4,435	61.10%	4,069	56.06%		
Abstentions	2,823	38.90%	3,189	43.94%		
Registered voters	7,258		7,258			
Source: National Independent Election Commission (CENI)

==== America ====
Party	First round		Second round		Seats	±
Party	Votes	%	Votes	%	Seats	±
Alliance for Justice and Democracy/Movement for Renewal and allies (AJD/MR+)	618	33.55%	840	47.38%	0	New
Republican Front for Unity and Democracy and allies (Hope Mauritania)	481	26.11%	903	50.93%	1	New
National Rally for Reform and Development (Tewassoul)	346	18.78%			0	New
El Insaf	330	17.92%			0	-1
Party of Conciliation and Prosperity (HIWAR)	32	1.74%			0	New
Union of the Forces of Progress (UFP)	10	0.54%			0	New
El Islah	7	0.38%			0	=
Blank votes	20	0.98%	30	1.69%		
Valid votes	1,842	94.70%	1,773	97.42%		
Null votes	103	5.30%	47	2.58%		
Seats					1	=
Turnout	1,945	72.14%	1,820	67.51%		
Abstentions	751	27.86%	876	32.49%		
Registered voters	2,696		2,696			
Source: National Independent Election Commission (CENI)

==== Asia ====
Party	First round		Second round		Seats	±
Party	Votes	%	Votes	%	Seats	±
National Rally for Reform and Development (Tewassoul)	1,059	36.08%	2,002	55.30%	1	New
El Insaf	988	33.66%	1,521	42.02%	0	-1
El Islah	429	14.62%			0	New
El Karama	142	4.84%			0	New
National Democratic Alliance (AND)	88	3.00%			0	New
Union for Democracy and Progress (UDP)	68	2.32%			0	New
El Vadila	35	1.19%			0	New
Mauritanian Party of Union and Change (HATEM)	25	0.85%			0	New
Party of Conciliation and Prosperity (HIWAR)	18	0.61%			0	New
People's Progressive Alliance (APP)	11	0.37%			0	New
Blank votes	73	2.64%	97	2.68%		
Valid votes	2,936	92.41%	3,620	98.13%		
Null votes	241	7.59%	69	1.87%		
Seats					1	=
Turnout	3,177	49.91%	3,689	57.95%		
Abstentions	3,189	50.09%	2,677	42.05%		
Registered voters	6,366		6,366			
Source: National Independent Election Commission (CENI)

==== Europe ====
Party	First round		Second round		Seats	±
Party	Votes	%	Votes	%	Seats	±
El Insaf	1,110	28.02%	1,733	57.79%	1	=
Sawab and allies (Sawab+)	729	18.40%	1,211	40.38%	0	New
Alliance for Justice and Democracy/Movement for Renewal and allies (AJD/MR+)	645	16.28%			0	New
Union for Democracy and Progress (UDP)	397	10.02%			0	New
Republican Front for Unity and Democracy and allies (Hope Mauritania)	340	8.58%			0	New
Rally of Democratic Forces (RFD)	285	7.19%			0	New
National Rally for Reform and Development (Tewassoul)	199	5.02%			0	New
El Ravah	67	1.69%			0	New
National Democratic Alliance (AND)	47	1.19%			0	New
Union of the Forces of Progress (UFP)	43	1.09%			0	New
People's Progressive Alliance (APP)	29	0.73%			0	New
Nida El Watan	27	0.68%			0	New
Mauritanian Party of Union and Change and El Islah (HATEM-El Islah)	15	0.38%			0	New
Party of Conciliation and Prosperity (HIWAR)	14	0.35%			0	New
El Karama	3	0.08%			0	New
Blank votes	12	0.30%	55	1.83%		
Valid votes	3,962	90.79%	2,999	97.31%		
Null votes	402	9.21%	83	2.69%		
Seats					1	=
Turnout	4,364	73.11%	3,082	51.63%		
Abstentions	1,605	26.89%	2,887	48.37%		
Registered voters	5,969		5,969			
Source: National Independent Election Commission (CENI)

== National list results' per wilaya ==
=== Overall ===
Party	AD	AS	BR	DN	GO	GU	HC	HG	IN	NN	NO	NS	TA	TZ	TR	XM	MRT		
Party		El Insaf	37.42%	33.59%	37.54%	23.41%	28.49%	29.25%	40.13%	30.02%	46.30%	28.41%	26.00%	37.87%	49.67%	30.17%	48.70%	20.04%	35.26%
Tewassoul	7.61%	17.13%	6.34%	7.93%	4.02%	6.18%	9.16%	13.33%	6.30%	16.32%	10.90%	14.26%	6.42%	10.71%	10.07%	20.25%	10.25%		
UDP	2.32%	2.19%	4.08%	4.07%	15.54%	25.50%	10.35%	6.60%	8.02%	2.71%	2.74%	1.82%	3.60%	4.87%	0.90%	4.03%	6.06%		
Sawab+	1.96%	2.86%	1.88%	5.59%	3.75%	13.39%	1.55%	1.15%	2.72%	5.28%	3.98%	5.65%	0.88%	3.30%	4.86%	13.83%	4.10%		
Hope Mauritania	1.03%	0.79%	4.93%	4.77%	3.04%	1.55%	0.47%	0.77%	1.20%	3.84%	6.67%	8.02%	0.59%	8.73%	3.14%	5.50%	3.33%		
AND	2.22%	2.79%	1.01%	2.91%	6.26%	6.51%	2.59%	0.87%	2.76%	7.08%	4.50%	1.78%	1.99%	1.63%	3.55%	1.58%	3.30%		
El Islah	13.26%	3.34%	1.71%	2.17%	1.54%	0.48%	4.70%	5.34%	2.08%	2.80%	4.24%	2.15%	3.11%	10.71%	2.35%	2.65%	3.28%		
HATEM	1.76%	3.37%	0.98%	3.03%	0.38%	0.35%	5.74%	11.79%	1.54%	2.18%	2.07%	3.41%	1.43%	3.01%	1.32%	1.49%	2.90%		
El Karama	0.62%	0.46%	5.55%	13.07%	8.99%	0.96%	1.22%	1.35%	0.51%	0.94%	1.14%	1.67%	0.45%	0.37%	0.56%	1.05%	2.62%		
Nida El Watan	0.69%	8.03%	0.59%	0.73%	0.75%	0.24%	2.64%	7.00%	1.29%	1.32%	3.01%	1.31%	0.63%	1.12%	2.79%	1.35%	2.50%		
AJD/MR+	0.37%	0.23%	6.50%	5.71%	4.42%	0.61%	0.15%	0.15%	1.46%	0.89%	3.08%	3.26%	0.09%	2.00%	0.35%	9.88%	2.18%		
HIWAR	6.48%	3.87%	3.44%	2.20%	1.76%	1.62%	3.10%	1.71%	1.85%	0.88%	0.60%	0.77%	0.88%	2.08%	1.41%	0.67%	2.08%		
PMM	3.87%	1.54%	0.66%	1.29%	0.46%	0.56%	1.97%	3.65%	1.26%	2.41%	4.07%	1.39%	1.43%	3.43%	3.35%	1.23%	2.08%		
PRDR	1.06%	5.70%	1.38%	2.38%	4.74%	0.18%	0.63%	1.93%	1.12%	1.97%	1.39%	0.94%	1.51%	0.94%	1.53%	1.10%	1.97%		
UFP	1.79%	2.97%	1.76%	1.69%	3.18%	1.41%	0.93%	1.04%	1.38%	2.02%	2.31%	1.91%	2.90%	1.58%	0.86%	1.16%	1.79%		
El Vadila	1.08%	2.13%	4.44%	0.81%	1.29%	2.37%	1.08%	2.27%	0.60%	1.82%	1.05%	0.99%	2.13%	1.53%	0.87%	1.81%	1.78%		
PUD	1.32%	0.65%	4.26%	0.99%	1.15%	0.42%	0.79%	3.40%	0.62%	1.93%	2.73%	0.83%	2.37%	0.70%	0.51%	1.63%	1.66%		
State of Justice	2.47%	0.73%	0.54%	1.95%	0.30%	0.27%	0.96%	0.81%	1.55%	2.38%	5.36%	1.75%	2.05%	2.24%	1.71%	2.35%	1.55%		
RFD	0.83%	0.61%	1.23%	3.68%	0.67%	0.14%	1.48%	0.90%	1.47%	2.89%	2.51%	1.09%	2.76%	1.09%	1.86%	3.23%	1.51%		
PSJN	1.89%	1.39%	3.64%	1.31%	4.61%	0.43%	0.94%	0.46%	0.46%	1.33%	0.89%	0.62%	1.55%	0.82%	0.32%	0.38%	1.48%		
El Ravah	2.94%	0.66%	0.98%	1.25%	0.36%	1.14%	1.28%	0.75%	1.00%	1.37%	1.51%	0.96%	10.04%	0.53%	1.54%	0.92%	1.43%		
APP	1.27%	0.56%	1.95%	1.47%	0.85%	1.77%	1.01%	0.55%	0.46%	1.91%	0.98%	2.58%	1.07%	2.52%	0.72%	0.67%	1.25%		
Ribat	1.45%	0.25%	0.41%	3.39%	0.31%	0.52%	0.91%	0.30%	10.62%	2.59%	2.39%	0.95%	0.57%	2.30%	0.45%	0.85%	1.07%		
PCP	0.72%	1.38%	1.13%	0.88%	0.60%	0.23%	1.19%	1.37%	0.57%	1.64%	1.33%	0.86%	0.42%	0.50%	0.61%	0.52%	0.96%		
CAP	0.33%	0.25%	0.23%	0.56%	0.45%	0.31%	0.25%	0.24%	0.30%	0.65%	1.18%	0.71%	0.19%	0.38%	3.75%	0.14%	0.91%		
Blank votes	3.24%	2.53%	2.84%	2.76%	2.09%	3.61%	4.78%	2.25%	2.56%	2.44%	3.37%	2.45%	1.27%	2.74%	1.92%	1.69%	2.70%		
Valid votes	81.73%	64.79%	79.47%	86.82%	76.72%	78.37%	51.47%	67.24%	85.86%	85.33%	85.43%	85.76%	77.95%	86.63%	86.10%	86.30%	75.88%		
Null votes	18.27%	35.21%	20.53%	13.18%	23.28%	21.63%	48.53%	32.76%	14.14%	14.67%	14.57%	14.24%	22.05%	13.37%	13.90%	13.70%	24.12%		
Turnout	71.27%	73.41%	76.82%	69.64%	77.37%	81.74%	75.69%	77.23%	61.24%	61.22%	61.46%	66.83%	74.15%	71.33%	67.58%	62.49%	71.59%		
Abstentions	28.73%	26.59%	23.18%	30.36%	22.63%	18.26%	24.31%	22.77%	38.76%	38.78%	38.54%	33.17%	25.85%	28.67%	32.42%	37.51%	28.41%		
Registered voters	53,331	164,442	180,078	66,423	135,491	91,826	198,099	152,255	19,789	120,387	141,914	119,367	55,836	28,182	236,739	22,289	1,786,448		
Source: National Independent Election Commission (CENI)

== Elected deputies ==
Electoral district	Deputy	Affiliation
National list	Mohamed Bemba Meguett	El Insaf
National list	Siham Mohamed Yahya Najem	El Insaf
National list	Mohamed Lemine Hamoud Amar	El Insaf
National list	Mariem El Hacen Oumar	El Insaf
National list	Youssouf Tijani Sylia	El Insaf
National list	Hamadi Khatary Hamadi	El Insaf
National list	Nouha Oumar Abidine Sidi	El Insaf
National list	Ahmedou Mohamed Mahfoudh M'Balla	Tewassoul
National list	Seddave Sidi Brahim Adda	Tewassoul
National list	Ousmane Racine Sanghott	UDP
National list	Biram Dah Dah Abeid	Sawab+
National list	El Id Mohameden M'Bareck	Hope Mauritania
National list	Yacoub Mohamed Abderrahmane Moine	AND
National list	Mohamed Ahmed Salem Talebna	El Islah
National list	Saleh Mohamedou Hanana	HATEM
National list	Nagi Mohamed Eterekzi	El Karama
National list	Daoud Abdallahi Ahmed Aicha	Nida El Watan
National list	Ibrahima Moctar Sarr	AJD/MR+
National list	Mohamed Ahmed Mohamed Cheikh Sid' Ahmed Wejih	HIWAR
National list	El Khalil Mohamedou Ennahoui	PMM
Women's national list	Fatimetou Khlivit Amour Habib	El Insaf
Women's national list	Saadani Mohamed Khaitour	El Insaf
Women's national list	Djeinaba Abdoul Samba Korka	El Insaf
Women's national list	Fatimetou Mohamed Abdellahi El Hacen	El Insaf
Women's national list	Mamah Mahfoudh Lemrabott	El Insaf
Women's national list	Salma Ramadhane Amar Cheine	El Insaf
Women's national list	Loula Ahmed Zarough	El Insaf
Women's national list	Mounina Ahmed Salem J'Reivine	Tewassoul
Women's national list	Zehoura Cheikhna Beidiya	Tewassoul
Women's national list	Naha Hamdi Mouknass	UDP
Women's national list	Mariem Cheikh Samba Dieng	Sawab+
Women's national list	Kadiata Malick Diallo	Hope Mauritania
Women's national list	Messouda Baham Mohamed Laghdaf	El Islah
Women's national list	Oumeya Said Abd El Ghader	HATEM
Women's national list	Aminetou Sidi Mohmad Hamadi	AND
Women's national list	Khaire Sidaty El Wedani	Nida El Watan
Women's national list	Tahra Mohamed Sidi Aly	El Karama
Women's national list	Mouna Sid'Ahmed Sebty	El Vadila
Women's national list	Vala Seidna Aly Miny	HIWAR
Women's national list	Saoudatou Mamadou Wane	AJD/MR+
Youth's national list	Khadijetou Abdoulaye Wane	El Insaf
Youth's national list	Isselmou Khatry Mohamed Jiddou	El Insaf
Youth's national list	Mohamed Vih El Barka Bah	El Insaf
Youth's national list	Jemile Mohamedou Nehah	El Insaf
Youth's national list	El Mourtadha Essalem T'Feil	Tewassoul
Youth's national list	El Hacen Kaber Sidi Brahim	UDP
Youth's national list	Aminetou El Hacen Boughel	Sawab+
Youth's national list	Khally Mamadou Diallo	Hope Mauritania
Youth's national list	Mohamed Sid'El Moctar Oumar	El Islah
Youth's national list	Mohamed Yayha Elmoustapha	HATEM
Youth's national list	Sid'Ahmed Ahmed Megaya	AND
Adel Begrou	Ahmoudeitt Abderrahmane Chein	El Insaf
Adel Begrou	El Vadil Siddaty Ahmed Louly	El Insaf
Aïoun	Oumar Abdi Ahmed Said	El Insaf
Aïoun	El Ghassem Sidi Ghoueizi	El Insaf
Akjoujt	Sid'Ahmed Mohamed El Hassen Doueiry	El Insaf
Aleg	El Bou Emoud Gelaa	El Insaf
Aleg	Fatimetou Blal M'Bareck	El Insaf
Amourj	Ahmed Deyt Mohamed El Moctar M'Heimed	El Insaf
Amourj	Mohamed Lemine Mohamed Guiye	El Insaf
Aoujeft	Mohamed Abdalahy Ely Telmoudy	El Insaf
Atar	El Houssein Mahfoudh Bouboutt	El Insaf
Atar	Ahmed Louleid Abdalla	El Insaf
Bababé	Oumar Abdoulaye Sow	El Insaf
Bababé	Adama Boubou Dieng	El Insaf
Barkéol	Moussa El Bechir Mohamed El Mehdy	El Insaf
Barkéol	Mohamedou Boukhreysse Abdallahi	El Insaf
Bassiknou	Mohamed Mahmoud Sidi Hanana	El Insaf
Bassiknou	Vih El Mane Khaina Ghacha	El Insaf
Bénichab	Ali Sidi Mohamed Dewla	El Insaf
Bir Moghrein	Mohamed Salem Ahmed Ahmed Noueygued	El Islah
Boghé	Moctar Al Housseynou Lam	El Insaf
Boghé	El Atigh Mohamed Mohamed	El Insaf
Boumdeid	Mohamed Lemine Mohamed Abdellahi El Ghazwany	El Insaf
Boutilimit	El Vouad Ahmed Salem Bouna Moctar	El Insaf
Boutilimit	Aboul Maouahib Mohamed El Houssein Habiboullah	El Insaf
Chami	Lemrabott Houmeya Tanji	El Insaf
Chinguetti	El Bou Hamdy Abdarrahmane	El Insaf
Djiguenni	Taleb Moustaphe Mohamed Lemine Sidi Abdalla	El Insaf
Djiguenni	Syedna Aly Hamady El Kowry	El Insaf
F'Déirick	Khaddad Lemrabott Moctar	El Insaf
Ghabou	Hajiratou Khalidou Ba	UDP
Ghabou	Abibou Moussa Dramé	UDP
Guerou	El Moukhtar Mohamed Limam	Tewassoul
Guerou	El Ghassem Mohamed Ahmed Taleb Ebeidy	El Vadila
Kaédi	Moussa Demba Sow	El Insaf
Kaédi	Mohamed Abdoul N'Diaye	UDP
Kaédi	Ousmane Oumar Ba	AJD/MR+
Kankoussa	Ibrahim Kaba Barick	El Insaf
Kankoussa	Chriv Sidi Ali Sidi Ali	El Insaf
Keur Macène	Ailoune Mohameden Mahmoud	El Insaf
Keur Macène	Weitate Sidi Yaaraf M'boirick	El Insaf
Kiffa	Lemrabott Mohamed Mohamed	Nida El Watan
Kiffa	Khattry Cheikh Mahmoud	El Insaf
Kiffa	Mohamed Mahmoud Cheikh El Ghouth	HIWAR
Koubenni	Babah Cheikhne Ahmed Babou	El Insaf
Koubenni	Fatma Sidi Mohamed Ely Mahmoud	UDP
Koubenni	Behaida Khouade Khattry	Nida El Watan
Lexeiba	Mohamed Abdallahi Mamoudou Kane	El Insaf
M'Bagne	Amadou Moctar Ibra Niang	El Insaf
M'Bagne	Ibrahima Mamadou Kebé	El Insaf
M'Bout	Jaafar Melaynine Hachem	El Insaf
M'Bout	El Hacen Cheikh Baha	El Karama
M'Bout	Yarba Sidi Breick	AND
Maghama	Mamadou Mamadou Niang	El Insaf
Maghama	Hachem Samoury M'Bareck Sebkha	El Insaf
Magta Lahjar	Ahmed El Mally Mohamed Menane	El Insaf
Magta Lahjar	Fatimetou Salma Mohamedou Sidi Hamoud	El Insaf
Male	Sidna Sidi Mohamed Ahmed Ely	El Insaf
Male	Zein El Abidine Sidi Ahmed Ahmed El Hadi	El Insaf
Méderdra	Mohamed El Khamess Sidi Abdallah Sidi Abdallah	El Insaf
Méderdra	Moustapha Boulah Souheib	El Insaf
Monguel	H'bib Brahim Diah	El Insaf
Monguel	Sidi Ahmed Ghaber	El Insaf
Moudjéria	Oumoukelthoum El Yassa El Yassa Soueid Ahmed	El Insaf
Moudjéria	Elyakher Yesslem Sidi El Moctar	El Insaf
N'beiket Lahwach	Salek Dah Ena	El Insaf
Néma	Mohamed El Ghaith El Hadrami Cheikh Mohamed Vadel	El Insaf
Néma	Vatimetou Mohamed Yarbe Jiyid	El Insaf
Nouadhibou	El Ghassem Bellali Bellali	El Karama
Nouadhibou	Mohamed Abdellahi El Mamy El Ghailany	El Insaf
Nouadhibou	Aziza Saleck Jiddou	Tewassoul
Nouadhibou	Khalidou Samba Sow	AJD/MR+
Nouakchott-Nord	Ahmed Jiddou Zein Limane	El Insaf
Nouakchott-Nord	Zeine Alabidine El Mounir Toulba	El Insaf
Nouakchott-Nord	Isselkou Mohamed Salem Bahah	Tewassoul
Nouakchott-Nord	Cheikh Mohamed Abderrahmane Moine	AND
Nouakchott-Nord	Abd Selam Horma Horma	Sawab+
Nouakchott-Nord	Mohamed Lemine El Moctar Sidi Maouloud	Hope Mauritania
Nouakchott-Nord	Mohamed El Moctar Sidi Zoghmane	UDP
Nouakchott-Ouest	Baba Mohamed El Moctar Ahmed Lebrahim	El Insaf
Nouakchott-Ouest	Rabya Cherif Haïdara	El Insaf
Nouakchott-Ouest	Mamadou Demba Ba	Tewassoul
Nouakchott-Ouest	Balla Abdou Touré	Hope Mauritania
Nouakchott-Ouest	El Wedia Mohamed Al Vagha	El Islah
Nouakchott-Ouest	Mohamed Bouya Cheikh El Mamoune Cheikh Mohamed Vadel	State of Justice
Nouakchott-Ouest	Mohamed El Moctar Mohamed El Moustapha Mohamed El Hassene	AND
Nouakchott-Sud	Maimouna Ahmed Salem Yahdhih	El Insaf
Nouakchott-Sud	El Moctar Khalifa Khalifa	El Insaf
Nouakchott-Sud	El Hacen Mohamed Belid	El Insaf
Nouakchott-Sud	Yahya Aboubecrine Sid Elemine	Tewassoul
Nouakchott-Sud	Amadou Tidjane Abou Diop	Hope Mauritania
Nouakchott-Sud	Ghame Achour Salem	Sawab+
Nouakchott-Sud	Mohamed El Moctar Mohamed Mahmoud El Moktar	El Karama
Ouad Naga	Jemal Mohamed Yedaly	El Insaf
Ouad Naga	Saleck Mohameden Haden	El Insaf
Ouadane	Abdou Louleid Wadad	El Islah
Oualata	Sidi Cheikh Diajouh	El Insaf
Ould Yengé	Almamy Ilo Ba	UDP
Ould Yengé	Tombé Amara Camara	UDP
R'Kiz	Mohamed Mohamed Abdallahi El Moustapha	El Insaf
R'Kiz	Abdellahi El Wely El Hacen Cheikh Mohamedou Yahya	El Insaf
Rosso	Mohamedhen Vall Mohamed El Alem	El Insaf
Rosso	Amet Mohamed Badien Fall	El Insaf
Sélibaby	Sidney Dramane Sokhona	El Insaf
Sélibaby	Habsa Yaya Kane	El Insaf
Tamchekett	Ahamdy Hamadi Ahamdy	El Insaf
Tamchekett	Mohamed Abderrahmane Mohamed Mahmoud Sabar	El Insaf
Tékane	Aly Mamoudou Kane	El Insaf
Tékane	Ahmed Mohamed Abbe	El Insaf
Tichitt	Bouya Ahmed Chrif Chrif El Mokhtar	El Insaf
Tidjikja	Ghleywa Eman Lahdhana	El Insaf
Tidjikja	Moustapha Sidi Hamoud	El Insaf
Timbédra	Sidelemine Sid M'Hamed Emine	El Insaf
Timbédra	Mohamedou Ahmedou Ahmedou	El Insaf
Tintane	Sidi Mohamed Mohamed Lemine Seyidi	El Insaf
Tintane	Moulkhaïry Mohamed Lemine Cheikh El Ghazwany	El Insaf
Touil	Mohamed Cheikh Sidiya Toulba	Nida El Watan
Wompou	Yakharé Biranté Soumaré	El Insaf
Wompou	Moussa Mamadou Dia	El Insaf
Zouérate	Hamoud Ely El Malha	El Insaf
Zouérate	Idoumou Mohamed Haky	El Insaf
Africa	Ahmedou Mohamed Bouvecha	El Insaf
America	Yahya Loud Seffah	Hope Mauritania
Asia	Abdallahi Sidi Mohamed Bouka	Tewassoul
Europe	Issa Mansega Ansoumane Diawara	El Insaf
Source: National Independent Election Commission (CENI)

=== Demographics ===
Deputies by gender
Men	76.7%
Women	23.3%

Deputies by age
25-35	7.39%
35-45	21.59%
45-55	32.95%
55-65	27.84%
65+	10.23%
