= Nouakchott-Ouest (National Assembly district) =

Constituency of the National Assembly of Mauritania

- electoral district for the National Assembly
- Location of Nouakchott-Ouest in Mauritania
- Moughataa: Ksar; Sebkha; Tevragh Zeina
- Wilaya: Nouakchott-Ouest
- Electorate: 141,914 (2023)

Current electoral district
- Created: 2023
- Seats: 7
- Deputies: El Insaf (2); Tewassoul (1); Hope MR (1); El Islah (1); CED (1); AND (1)
- Created from: Nouakchott

Nouakchott-Ouest (Arabic: نواكشوط الغربية) is one of the 60 electoral districts represented in the National Assembly. The constituency currently elects 7 deputies. Its boundaries correspond to those of the Mauritanian wilaya of Nouakchott-Ouest. The electoral system uses the largest remainder method and a closed-list proportional representation, with no minimum threshold.

== Historic representation ==
Historic composition of the district
Key to parties Hope Mauritania AND El Islah El Insaf State of Justice Tewassoul
Legislature	Election	Distribution
10th	2023	1 / 1 / 1 / 2 / 1 / 1

=== List of deputies ===
Legislature	Member	Party
10th	Baba Mohamed El Moctar Ahmed Lebrahim	El Insaf
10th	Rabya Cherif Haïdara	El Insaf
10th	Mamadou Demba Ba	Tewassoul
10th	Balla Abdou Touré	Hope Mauritania
10th	El Wedia Mohamed Al Vagha	El Islah
10th	Mohamed Bouya Cheikh El Mamoune Cheikh Mohamed Vadel	State of Justice
10th	Mohamed El Moctar Mohamed El Moustapha Mohamed El Hassene	AND

== Election results ==
=== 2023 ===
Parliamentary Election 2023: Nouakchott-Ouest
Party	Votes	%	Seats
El Insaf	18,375	24.61	2
National Rally for Reform and Development	7,754	10.39	1
Hope Mauritania	4,488	6.01	1
El Islah	4,224	5.66	1
State of Justice and El Vadila	4,151	5.56	1
National Democratic Alliance	3,481	4.66	1
Nida El Watan	2,773	3.71	0
Democratic Alternation Pole (Sawab–RAG)	2,756	3.69	0
Party of Unity and Development	2,707	3.63	0
Union for Democracy and Progress	2,416	3.24	0
Rally of Democratic Forces	2,366	3.17	0
Alliance for Justice and Democracy/Movement for Renewal	2,331	3.12	0
Mauritanian Party of Union and Change	2,096	2.81	0
Union of the Forces of Progress	2,005	2.69	0
National Cohesion for Rights and the Construction of Generations	1,583	2.12	0
El Karama	1,552	2.08	0
Party of Construction and Progress	1,432	1.92	0
Party of the Mauritanian Masses	1,292	1.73	0
Centre through Action for Progress	1,212	1.62	0
El Ravah	1,191	1.60	0
People's Progressive Alliance	655	0.88	0
Burst of Youth for the Nation	542	0.73	0
Republican Party for Democracy and Renewal	536	0.72	0
Party of Conciliation and Prosperity	414	0.55	0
Blank votes	2,318	3.11	–
Total	74,650	100.00	7
Valid votes	74,650	86.40	
Invalid votes	11,752	13.60	
Total votes	86,402	100.00	
Registered voters/turnout	141,914	60.88	
Source: National Independent Election Commission
