= Nouakchott-Sud (National Assembly district) =

Constituency of the National Assembly of Mauritania

- electoral district for the National Assembly
- Location of Nouakchott-Sud in Mauritania
- Moughataa: Arafat; El Mina; Riyad
- Wilaya: Nouakchott-Sud
- Electorate: 119,367 (2023)

Current electoral district
- Created: 2023
- Seats: 7
- Deputies: El Insaf (3); Tewassoul (1); Hope MR (1); Sawab–RAG (1); El Karama (1)
- Created from: Nouakchott

Nouakchott-Sud (Arabic: نواكشوط الجنوبية) is one of the 60 electoral districts represented in the National Assembly. The constituency currently elects 7 deputies. Its boundaries correspond to those of the Mauritanian wilaya of Nouakchott-Sud. The electoral system uses the largest remainder method and a closed-list proportional representation, with no minimum threshold.

== Historic representation ==
Historic composition of the district
Key to parties Hope Mauritania Sawab–RAG El Karama El Insaf Tewassoul
Legislature	Election	Distribution
10th	2023	1 / 1 / 1 / 3 / 1

=== List of deputies ===
Legislature	Member	Party
10th	Maimouna Ahmed Salem Yahdhih	El Insaf
10th	El Moctar Khalifa Khalifa	El Insaf
10th	El Hacen Mohamed Belid	El Insaf
10th	Yahya Aboubecrine Sid Elemine	Tewassoul
10th	Amadou Tidjane Abou Diop	Hope Mauritania
10th	Ghame Achour Salem	Sawab–RAG
10th	Mohamed El Moctar Mohamed Mahmoud El Moktar	El Karama

== Election results ==
=== 2023 ===
Parliamentary Election 2023: Nouakchott-Sud
Party	Votes	%	Seats
El Insaf	25,844	37.74	3
National Rally for Reform and Development	9,979	14.57	1
Hope Mauritania	5,281	7.71	1
Democratic Alternation Pole (Sawab–RAG)	3,379	4.93	1
El Karama	2,880	4.21	1
Alliance for Justice and Democracy/Movement for Renewal	2,334	3.41	0
El Islah	2,151	3.14	0
People's Progressive Alliance	1,774	2.59	0
National Democratic Alliance	1,510	2.20	0
Mauritanian Party of Union and Change	1,460	2.13	0
Nida El Watan	1,437	2.10	0
Union for Democracy and Progress	1,378	2.01	0
Union of the Forces of Progress	1,258	1.84	0
State of Justice	1,051	1.53	0
Centre through Action for Progress	711	1.04	0
El Ravah	689	1.01	0
National Cohesion for Rights and the Construction of Generations	595	0.87	0
El Vadila	495	0.72	0
Rally of Democratic Forces	478	0.70	0
Party of the Mauritanian Masses	472	0.69	0
Party of Unity and Development	448	0.65	0
Party of Construction and Progress	445	0.65	0
Party of Conciliation and Prosperity	387	0.57	0
Burst of Youth for the Nation	282	0.41	0
Blank votes	1,768	2.58	–
Total	68,486	100.00	7
Valid votes	68,486	86.10	
Invalid votes	11,052	13.90	
Total votes	79,538	100.00	
Registered voters/turnout	119,367	66.63	
Source: National Independent Election Commission
