= Chami (National Assembly district) =

Electoral district in Mauritania

- electoral district for the National Assembly
- Location of Chami within Mauritania.
- Moughataa: Chami
- Wilaya: Dakhlet Nouadhibou
- Electorate: ▼10,669 (2023)

Current electoral district
- Created: 2013
- Seats: 1
- Party: El Insaf (1)
- Deputy: Lemrabott Houmeya Tanji
- Created from: Nouadhibou

Chami (Arabic: الشامي) is one of the 60 electoral districts represented in the National Assembly. The constituency currently elects 7 deputies. Its boundaries correspond to those of the Mauritanian moughataa of Chami. The electoral system uses the largest remainder method and a closed-list proportional representation, with no minimum threshold.

== Historic representation ==
Election	Member	Party
2013	Lemrabott Houmeya Tanji	UPR
2018	Lemrabott Houmeya Tanji	UPR
2023	Lemrabott Houmeya Tanji	El Insaf

== Election results ==
=== 2023 ===
Parliamentary Election 2023: Bénichab
Party	Votes	%	Seats
El Insaf	3,727	68.26	1
National Rally for Reform and Development	735	13.46	0
National Democratic Alliance	401	7.34	0
Democratic Alternation Pole (Sawab–RAG)	245	4.49	0
Rally of Democratic Forces	69	1.26	0
Alliance for Justice and Democracy/Movement for Renewal	55	1.01	0
Party of Unity and Development	32	0.59	0
Blank votes	196	3.59	–
Total	5,460	100.00	1
Valid votes	5,460	86.78	
Invalid votes	832	13.22	
Total votes	6,292	100.00	
Registered voters/turnout	10,669	58.97	
Source: National Independent Election Commission

=== 2018 ===
Parliamentary Election 2018: Chami
Party	Votes	%	Seats
Union for the Republic	4,969	68.43	1
Union for Democracy and Progress	1,529	21.06	0
National Rally for Reform and Development	373	5.14	0
Democratic Alternation Pole (Sawab–RAG)	107	1.47	0
National Democratic Alliance	49	0.67	0
New Vision	44	0.61	0
Rally for Freedom and Democracy	13	0.18	0
Blank votes	177	2.44	–
Total	7,261	100.00	1
Valid votes	7,261	91.17	
Invalid votes	703	8.83	
Total votes	7,964	100.00	
Registered voters/turnout	12,874	61.86	
Source: National Independent Election Commission

=== 2013 ===
Parliamentary Election 2013: Chami
Party	Votes	%	Seats
Union for the Republic	2,203	57.76	1
National Rally for Reform and Development	324	8.50	0
Burst of Youth for the Nation	310	8.13	0
El Wiam	308	8.08	0
People's Progressive Alliance	283	7.42	0
Democratic Concertation Party	172	4.51	0
Rally for Unity	104	2.73	0
Democratic Socialist Party	23	0.60	0
Blank votes	87	2.28	–
Total	3,814	100.00	1
Valid votes	3,814	90.49	
Invalid votes	401	9.51	
Total votes	4,215	100.00	
Registered voters/turnout	5,913	71.28	
Source: National Independent Election Commission
