= Akjoujt (National Assembly district) =

Constituency of the National Assembly of Mauritania

- electoral district for the National Assembly
- Location of Akjoujt within Mauritania.
- Moughataa: Akjoujt
- Wilaya: Inchiri
- Electorate: ▼8,376 (2023)

Current electoral district
- Seats: 1
- Party: El Insaf (1)
- Deputy: Sid'Ahmed Mohamed El Hassen Doueiry

Akjoujt (Arabic: اكجوجت) is one of the 60 electoral districts represented in the National Assembly. The constituency currently elects 1 deputy. Its boundaries correspond to those of the Mauritanian moughataa of Akjoujt. The electoral system uses the two-round system.

== Historic representation ==
Election	Member	Party
1992	Maurice Benza	PRDS
1996	Maurice Benza	PRDS
2001	Maurice Benza	PRDS
2006	Abdel Aziz Ould Moustapha	Independent
2013	Sid'Ahmed Mohamed El Hassen Doueiry	UPR
2018	Sid'Ahmed Mohamed El Hassen Doueiry	UPR
2023	Sid'Ahmed Mohamed El Hassen Doueiry	El Insaf

== Election results ==
=== 2023 ===
Parliamentary Election 2023: Akjoujt
Candidate	Party	Votes	%	Seats
Sid'Ahmed Mohamed El Hassen Doueiry	El Insaf	3,501	69.85	1
Vetiya Sid' Ahmed Samba	UFP–AJD/MR–RFD	480	9.58	0
Abdallahi Sid'Ahmed Yargue	Democratic Alternation Pole (Sawab–RAG)	343	6.84	0
Mohamed El Jewde Hawatt	National Cohesion for Rights and the Construction of Generations	197	3.93	0
Sid'Ahmed Abderrahmane Mohamed M'Bareck	El Islah	153	3.05	0
Blank votes		338	6.74	–
Total		5,012	100.00	1
Valid votes		5,012	84.78	
Invalid votes		900	15.22	
Total votes		5,912	100.00	
Registered voters/turnout		8,376	70.58	
Source: National Independent Election Commission

=== 2018 ===
Parliamentary Election 2018: Akjoujt
Party	Votes	%	Seats
Union for the Republic	4,329	68.13	1
El Karama	1,022	16.08	0
Party of Dignity and Action	296	4.66	0
National Democratic Alliance	167	2.63	0
Rally of Democratic Forces	142	2.23	0
Democratic Alternation Pole (Sawab–RAG)	129	2.03	0
El Islah	79	1.24	0
National Cohesion for Rights and the Construction of Generations	53	0.83	0
Blank votes	137	2.16	–
Total	6,354	100.00	1
Valid votes	6,354	90.78	
Invalid votes	645	9.22	
Total votes	6,999	100.00	
Registered voters/turnout	9,472	73.89	
Source: National Independent Election Commission

=== 2013 ===
Parliamentary Election 2013: Akjoujt
Party	Votes	%	Seats
Union for the Republic	4,874	52.95	1
El Wiam	1,956	21.25	0
Burst of Youth for the Nation	839	9.11	0
National Rally for Reform and Development	588	6.39	0
People's Progressive Alliance	542	5.89	0
Party of Civilisation and Development	179	1.94	0
Democratic Socialist Party	39	0.42	0
Blank votes	188	2.04	–
Total	9,205	100.00	1
Valid votes	9,205	91.17	
Invalid votes	891	8.83	
Total votes	10,096	100.00	
Registered voters/turnout	13,941	72.42	
Source: National Independent Election Commission
