= Bénichab (National Assembly district) =

Constituency of the National Assembly of Mauritania

- electoral district for the National Assembly
- Location of Bénichab within Mauritania.
- Moughataa: Bénichab
- Wilaya: Inchiri
- Electorate: ▲11,413 (2023)

Current electoral district
- Created: 2018
- Seats: 1
- Party: El Insaf (1)
- Deputy: Ali Sidi Mohamed Dewla
- Created from: Akjoujt

Bénichab (Arabic: بنشاب) is one of the 60 electoral districts represented in the National Assembly. The constituency currently elects 1 deputy. Its boundaries correspond to those of the Mauritanian moughataa of Bénichab. The electoral system uses the two-round system.

== Historic representation ==
Election	Member	Party
2018	Ali Sidi Mohamed Dewla	UPR
2023	Ali Sidi Mohamed Dewla	El Insaf

== Election results ==
=== 2023 ===
Parliamentary Election 2023: Bénichab
Candidate	Party	Votes	%	Seats
Ali Sidi Mohamed Dewla	El Insaf	3,539	69.72	1
Ahmedou Ahmed Yacoub Chach	National Cohesion for Rights and the Construction of Generations	874	17.22	0
Bounene Sidi Zeini	Democratic Alternation Pole (Sawab–RAG)	247	4.87	0
Meilemnine Abdel Ghoudouss Ismail	Rally of Democratic Forces	237	4.67	0
Blank votes		179	3.53	–
Total		5,076	100.00	1
Valid votes		5,076	87.59	
Invalid votes		719	12.41	
Total votes		5,795	100.00	
Registered voters/turnout		11,413	50.78	
Source: National Independent Election Commission

=== 2018 ===
Parliamentary Election 2018: Bénichab
Party	Votes	%	Seats
Union for the Republic	3,817	76.45	1
National Rally for Reform and Development	874	17.50	0
Rally of Democratic Forces	123	2.46	0
National Democratic Alliance	72	1.44	0
Party of the Democratic People	41	0.82	0
Blank votes	66	1.32	–
Total	4,993	100.00	1
Valid votes	4,993	89.19	
Invalid votes	605	10.81	
Total votes	5,598	100.00	
Registered voters/turnout	8,112	69.01	
Source: National Independent Election Commission
