= Timbédra (National Assembly district) =

Constituency of the National Assembly of Mauritania

- electoral district for the National Assembly
- Location of Timbédra within Mauritania.
- Moughataa: Timbédra
- Wilaya: Hodh Ech Chargui
- Electorate: ▲38,489 (2023)

Current electoral district
- Seats: 2
- Party: El Insaf (2)
- Deputies: Sidelemine Sid M'Hamed Emine; Mohamedou Ahmedou Ahmedou

Timbédra (Arabic: تمبدغة) is one of the 60 electoral districts represented in the National Assembly. The constituency currently elects 2 deputies. Its boundaries correspond to those of the Mauritanian moughataa of Timbédra. The electoral system uses the two-round general ticket system.

== Historic representation ==
Legislature	Member	Party
8th	Mohamed Mohamedou Abdellahi	UPR
8th	Mohamedou Ahmedou Ahmedou	UPR
9th	Mohamedou Ahmedou Ahmedou	UPR
9th	El Bou Mohamed Khatoury	UPR
10th	Sidelemine Sid M'Hamed Emine	El Insaf
10th	Mohamedou Ahmedou Ahmedou	El Insaf

== Election results ==
=== 2023 ===
Parliamentary Election 2023: Timbédra
Party	Votes	%	Seats
El Insaf	14,661	53.55	2
Union for Democracy and Progress	10,765	39.32	0
National Rally for Reform and Development	1,045	3.82	0
Rally of Democratic Forces	522	1.91	0
Democratic Alternation Pole (Sawab–RAG)	172	0.63	0
Blank votes	212	0.77	–
Total	27,377	100.00	2
Valid votes	27,377	89.73	
Invalid votes	3,135	10.27	
Total votes	30,512	100.00	
Registered voters/turnout	38,489	79.27	
Source: National Independent Election Commission

=== 2018 ===
Parliamentary Election 2018: Timbédra
Party	Votes	%	Seats
Union for the Republic	8,675	52.63	2
National Rally for Reform and Development	2,702	16.39	0
National Democratic Alliance	1,337	8.11	0
Union for Development and Democracy Party	1,024	6.21	0
Party of Civilisation and Development	550	3.34	0
Rally of Democratic Forces	441	2.68	0
New Generation	429	2.60	0
Party of Dignity and Action	373	2.26	0
People's Progressive Alliance	363	2.20	0
Blank votes	590	3.58	–
Total	16,484	100.00	2
Valid votes	16,484	72.11	
Invalid votes	6,376	27.89	
Total votes	22,860	100.00	
Registered voters/turnout	30,349	75.32	
Source: National Independent Election Commission

=== 2013 ===
Parliamentary Election 2018: Timbédra
Party	Votes	%	Seats
Union for the Republic	12,167	57.96	2
Burst of Youth for the Nation	5,463	26.03	0
National Rally for Reform and Development	1,598	7.61	0
Democratic and Social Ribat Party	580	2.76	0
People's Progressive Alliance	421	2.01	0
El Wiam	214	1.02	0
El Vadila	187	0.89	0
Unitary Party for the Construction of Mauritania	150	0.71	0
Blank votes	211	1.01	–
Total	20,991	100.00	2
Valid votes	20,991	89.69	
Invalid votes	2,413	10.31	
Total votes	23,404	100.00	
Registered voters/turnout	27,605	84.78	
Source: National Independent Election Commission

=== 2006 ===
Parliamentary Election 2006: Timbédra
Party	First round		Second round		Seats
Party	Votes	%	Votes	%	Seats
Independent list: Democratic Rally for Building	6,855	38.52	9,418	50.91	2
Independent list: Union of the Forces of Change	6,172	34.68	8,553	46.23	0
People's Progressive Alliance	2,144	12.05			0
Rally of Democratic Forces	1,104	6.20			0
Rally for Democracy and Unity	557	3.13			0
Popular Front	319	1.79			0
Union of the Democratic Centre	307	1.73			0
Union for Democracy and Progress	181	1.02			0
Blank votes	156	0.88	530	2.86	–
Total	17,795	100.00	18,501	100.00	2
Valid votes	17,795	89.87			
Invalid votes	2,006	10.13			
Total votes	19,801	100.00			
Registered voters/turnout	25,522	77.58	25,522	–	
Source: Mauritanian News Agency and University of Nouakchott Al Aasriya
