= Action for Change =

Political party in Mauritania

Action for Change Action pour le changement العمل من أجل التغيير
- Leader: Messaoud Ould Boulkheir
- Founder: Messaoud Ould Boulkheir
- Founded: 1996
- Dissolved: January 2002
- Succeeded by: People's Progressive Alliance
- Ideology: Haratin interests Minority politics

The Action for Change (AC) (French: Action pour le changement) was a political party in Mauritania. The party was led by Messaoud Ould Boulkheir, and campaigned for greater rights for Mauritania's Haratin and black populations. The party was banned and dissolved in January 2002.

== History ==
=== Electoral history ===
The first election contested by the AC was the 1996 parliamentary election, with the party coming third, with 5.3% of the vote and 1 seat in Parliament.

The party also participated in the 2001 parliamentary election, winning 5.5% of the popular vote and 4 out of 81 seats.

=== Dissolution ===
The party was banned and officially dissolved in January 2002 following accusations by the Mauritanian Government that the party threatened Mauritanian national unity and was threatening Mauritania's relations with Senegal. Communications Minister Chyakh Ould Ely accused the party of being racist and violent. The party was allowed to keep its four parliamentary seats.

Messaoud Ould Boulkheir, the leader of the dissolved AC strongly denied the allegations made against the party and claimed that the party was instead being banned as part of a "crackdown" in dissent by the Government, and also because of the party's recent electoral gains.
