= Akjoujt (department) =

- Department
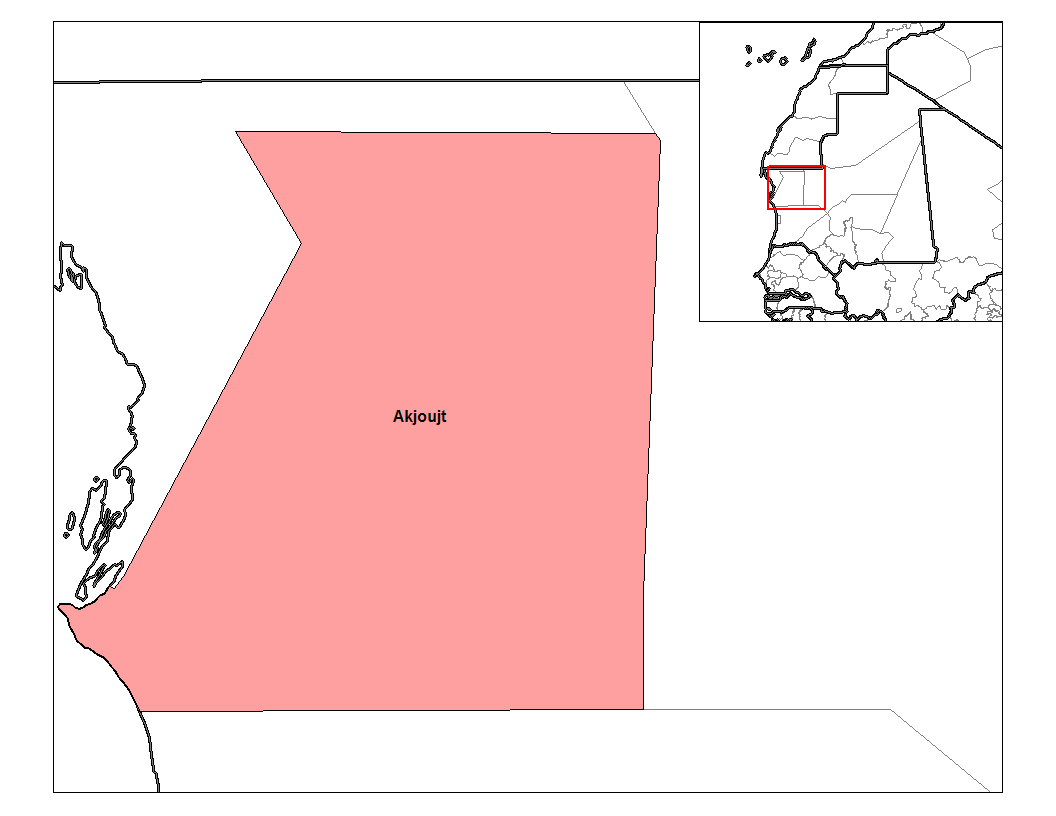
- Coordinates: 19°44′0″N 14°23′0″W
- Country: Mauritania

Area
  - Total: 15,531 sq mi (40,224 km^{2})

Population (2013 census)
  - Total: 19,639
  - Density: 1.2645/sq mi (0.48824/km^{2})

Akjoujt is a department of Inchiri in Mauritania.

The capital lies at Akjoujt. The other village is Benichab.
