= Non-attached members (Mauritania) =

Parliament members not belonging to any group in the North-West African country

The non-attached members (Arabic: النواب الغير مسجلين, French: députés non-inscrits) are the deputies who are not members of any parliamentary group of the National Assembly of Mauritania. They are recognized by the Article 23.2 of the Rules of the National Assembly.

== Membership ==
=== 10th National Assembly (2023-present) ===
10 deputies sat as non-attached members during the 10th National Assembly.

Electoral district	Deputy	Affiliation
National list	Biram Dah Dah Abeid	Sawab–RAG
National list	Ibrahima Moctar Sarr	AJD/MR+
Women's national list	Mariem Cheikh Samba Dieng	Sawab–RAG
Women's national list	Saoudatou Mamadou Wane	AJD/MR+
Youth's national list	Aminetou El Hacen Boughel	Sawab–RAG
Kaédi	Ousmane Oumar Ba	AJD/MR+
Nouadhibou	Khalidou Samba Sow	AJD/MR+
Nouakchott-Nord	Abd Selam Horma Horma	Sawab–RAG
Nouakchott-Ouest	Mohamed Bouya Cheikh El Mamoune Cheikh Mohamed Vadel	State of Justice
Nouakchott-Sud	Ghame Achour Salem	Sawab–RAG
Source: National Independent Election Commission (CENI)
