= Benichab =

Town in Mauritania

- Commune and city
- Location in Mauritania
- Coordinates: 19°26′N 15°21′W
- Country: Mauritania
- Region: Inchiri

Area
  - Total: 5,370 sq mi (13,908 km^{2})

Population (2013 census)
  - Total: 5,096
  - Density: 0.9490/sq mi (0.3664/km^{2})
- Time zone: UTC+0 (GMT)

Benichab is a town and urban commune in the Inchiri Region of southern-central Mauritania.
