= Electoral districts of Mauritania =

Mauritania is divided into several electoral districts (Arabic: دوائر إنتخابية) for the election of deputies to the National Assembly, based on the departments of the country, with the exception of the capital city of Nouakchott, where the electoral districts are based on the three regions the city is divided in.

== Electoral system ==
The 176 members of the National Assembly are elected by two methods (with Mauritanians being able to cast four different votes in a parallel voting system); 125 are elected from single- or multi-member electoral districts based on the departments (or moughataas) that the country is subdivided in (which the exception of Nouakchott, which is divided in three 7-seat constituencies based on the three regions (or wilayas) the city is subdivided in), using either the two-round system or proportional representation; in single-member constituencies candidates require a majority of the vote to be elected in the first round and a plurality in the second round. In two-seat constituencies, voters vote for a party list; if no list receives more than 50% of the vote in the first round, a second round is held, with the winning party taking both seats. In constituencies with three or more seats, closed list proportional representation is used, with seats allocated using the largest remainder method. For three-seat constituencies, party lists must include a female candidate in first or second on the list; for larger constituencies a zipper system is used, with alternate male and female candidates.

The Mauritania diaspora gets allocated four seats, with the 2023 election being the first time Mauritanians in the diaspora are able to directly elect their representatives.

The remaining 51 seats are elected from three nationwide constituencies, also using closed list proportional representation: a 20-seat national list (which uses a zipper system), a 20-seat women's national list and a 11-seat youth list (with two reserved for people with special needs), which also uses a zipper system to guarantee the representation of women.

=== Distribution of seats ===
Every department gets a set number of seats based on their population.

Population	Seats	Election system
Equal or less than 31,000	1	Two-round system
More than 31,000 but no more than 90,000	2	Two-round general ticket
More than 90,000 but no more than 120,000	3	Largest remainder method without an electoral threshold
More than 120,000	4	Largest remainder method without an electoral threshold
Districts of Nouakchott (pre-assigned)	7	Largest remainder method without an electoral threshold

== Electoral districts ==
Map of the electoral districts in use since 2023

List of districts in Mauritania since 2023
Wilaya	District	Registered voters	Seats
Adrar	Aoujeft	12,657 (2023)	1
Adrar	Atar	26,486 (2023)	2
Adrar	Chinguetti	10,523 (2023)	1
Adrar	Ouadane	3,428 (2023)	1
Assaba	Barkéol	37,795 (2023)	2
Assaba	Boumdeid	10,763 (2023)	1
Assaba	Guerou	25,828 (2023)	2
Assaba	Kankossa	28,954 (2023)	2
Assaba	Kiffa	61,102 (2023)	3
Brakna	Aleg	37,250 (2023)	2
Brakna	Bababé	19,898 (2023)	2
Brakna	Boghé	33,725 (2023)	2
Brakna	Magta Lahjar	42,026 (2023)	2
Brakna	Male (new)	24,809 (2023)	2
Brakna	M'Bagne	22,377 (2023)	2
Dakhlet Nouadhibou	Chami	10,669 (2023)	1
Dakhlet Nouadhibou	Nouadhibou	55,754 (2023)	4
Gorgol	Kaédi	35,785 (2023)	3
Gorgol	Lexeiba (new)	14,616 (2023)	1
Gorgol	Maghama	22,344 (2023)	2
Gorgol	M'Bout	42,733 (2023)	3
Gorgol	Monguel	20,013 (2023)	2
Guidimaga	Ghabou	22,802 (2023)	2
Guidimaga	Ould Yengé	28,180 (2023)	2
Guidimaga	Sélibaby	25,847 (2023)	2
Guidimaga	Wompou (new)	14,996 (2023)	2
Hodh Ech Chargui	Amourj	22,745 (2023)	2
Hodh Ech Chargui	Bassiknou	25,291 (2023)	2
Hodh Ech Chargui	Djigueni	29,897 (2023)	2
Hodh Ech Chargui	N'Beiket Lehwach (new)	8,333 (2023)	1
Hodh Ech Chargui	Néma	45,191 (2023)	2
Hodh Ech Chargui	Oualata	8,850 (2023)	1
Hodh Ech Chargui	Timbédra	38,489 (2023)	2
Hodh El Gharbi	Aïoun	38,430 (2023)	2
Hodh El Gharbi	Koubenni	40,570 (2023)	3
Hodh El Gharbi	Tamchekett	20,421 (2023)	2
Hodh El Gharbi	Tintane	41,156 (2023)	2
Hodh El Gharbi	Touil (new)	11,678 (2023)	1
Inchiri	Akjoujt	8,326 (2023)	1
Inchiri	Bénichab	11,414 (2023)	1
Nouakchott-Nord (new)		120,387 (2023)	7
Nouakchott-Ouest (new)		141,921 (2023)	7
Nouakchott-Sud (new)		119,368 (2023)	7
Tagant	Moudjéria	28,224 (2023)	2
Tagant	Tichitt	4,966 (2023)	1
Tagant	Tidjikja	22,643 (2023)	2
Tiris Zemmour	Bir Moghrein	3,863 (2023)	1
Tiris Zemmour	F'Déirick	4,152 (2023)	1
Tiris Zemmour	Zouérate	19,838 (2023)	2
Trarza	Boutilimit	49,529 (2023)	2
Trarza	Keur Macène	28,619 (2023)	2
Trarza	Méderdra	24,533 (2023)	2
Trarza	Ouad Naga	51,217 (2023)	2
Trarza	R'Kiz	29,791 (2023)	2
Trarza	Rosso	29,710 (2023)	2
Trarza	Tékane (new)	23,113 (2023)	2
Diaspora	Africa	7,258 (2023)	1
Diaspora	America	2,695 (2023)	1
Diaspora	Asia	6,366 (2023)	1
Diaspora	Europe	5,969 (2023)	1
Total		1,785,036 (2023)	125
