= Rally for Democracy and Unity =

Former political party in Mauritania

Rally for Democracy and Unity Rassemblement pour la Démocratie et l'Unité
- President: Ahmed Ould Sidi Baba
- Founded: 1991
- Dissolved: 5 March 2019
- National affiliation: Coordination of the Democratic Opposition

The Rally for Democracy and Unity (RDU) (French: Rassemblement pour la Démocratie et l'Unité) was a small political party in Mauritania. The party was founded in 1991, and was led by Ahmed Ould Sidi Baba until the dissolution of the party in March 2019.

The party won 9.6% of the vote of 3 out of 81 seats at the 2001 parliamentary election. At the 2006 elections the party won only 3 out of 95 seats. The RDU was officially dissolved on March 5, 2019.
