= State of Justice Coalition =

State of Justice Coalition ائتلاف دولة العدل Coalition État de Droit
- Leader: Collective leadership
- Founded: 5 October 2022
- Headquarters: Nouakchott
- Ideology: Populism; Reformism; Anti-corruption; Anti-establishment; Youth interests Civic nationalism Social conservatism
- Political position: Big tent
- Parliamentary group: Non-attached
- Slogan: مُمْكِن (It is possible)
- Members: See composition
- National Assembly: 1 / 176
- Regional councils: 1 / 285
- Mayors: 1 / 238

Election symbol

The State of Justice Coalition (Arabic: ائتلاف دولة العدل, French: Coalition État de Droit) is a coalition of several political movements in Mauritania with the intention of running in the upcoming 2023 parliamentary, regional and local elections.

== History ==
The coalition was publicly presented on 5 October 2022 in Nouakchott by the leaders of the five political movements composing the coalition: the Union for Planning and Construction (UPC), which was until that point in the Coordination of Parties of the Majority, the Right Choice Bloc supporting independent opposition MP Mohamed Bouye Ould Cheikh Mohamed Vadel and the youth movements of Kavana (We've had enough), Forward Mauritania and the Party of National Choice. The coalition will run under the UPC label since it is the only party legally registered.

Mohamed Bouye Ould Cheikh Mohamed Vadel confirmed on a TV interview that the coalition would run candidates in all electoral districts, regional councils and municipalities, with him considering that the coalition would be able to be "competitive" in several districts.

On 30 October 2022, Forward Mauritania announced that it would lead the coalition in Nouakchott-Nord, leading the coalition's list in the parliamentary election in the National Assembly district and the lists of Teyarett, Dar-Naim and Toujounine in the local elections.

On 6 July 2023, the Kavana Movement announced its withdrawal from the State of Justice Coalition.

== Ideology ==
The coalition considers itself as a third option between the ruling coalition, which they consider as characterized by "flattery, political hypocrisy and mass corruption", and the traditional opposition that "has been unable for decades to bring about the desired change".

The coalition organizers said in a statement that they aim to "establish a state of justice, law, and institutions that guarantee the preservation of religion, identity, national cohesion, the separation of powers, and protect all sanctities and other constants stipulated in the Constitution".

Dah Yaqoub, a journalist, told Maghreb Voices that he considered that the list has great chances among the youth (which represents more than three quarters of the population) due to its "rhetoric that is different from the current coldness in the opposition's performance" and its inclusion in the political scene of young faces "who were arrested because of their struggle to improve the country's economic situation".

== Composition ==
Name
Union for Planning and Construction (UPC)
Right Choice Bloc (Khiar El Haq)
Kavana Movement
Party of the National Choice (PON)
Mauritania Forward

== See also ==
- Coordination of Parties of the Majority
- Hope Mauritania
