= El Ravah =

The Ravah Party (Arabic: حزب الرفاه) is a minor political party in Mauritania led by Mohamed Ould Vall.

== History ==
The party won three seats in the 2013 parliamentary elections. However, it lost its seat in the 2018 elections, and failed to win a seat in the 2023 elections.
