= Party of Unity and Development =

The Party of Unity and Development (French: Parti de l’Unité et du Développement, PUD) is a small political party in Mauritania led by Mohamed Baro.

== History ==
The party won three seats in the 2013 parliamentary elections. It lost all three seats in the 2018 elections, and failed to win a seat in the 2023 elections.
