= Refoundation for a Global Action =

Refoundation for a Global Action حزب إعادة التأسيس من أجل العمل الشامل Refondation pour une Action Globale
- Abbreviation: RAG (French) الرگ (Arabic)
- President: Oumar Ould Yali
- Founded: 28 April 2013
- Headquarters: Nouakchott
- Activist wing: Initiative for the Resurgence of the Abolitionist Movement
- Ideology: Anti-slavery; Anti-establishment; Haratine interests
- National affiliation: Democratic Alternation Pole
- Parliamentary group: Non-attached
- Colours: Current: Yellow; Former: Red; Black
- National Assembly: 4 / 176

The Refoundation for a Global Action, (Note: Arabic: حزب إعادة التأسيس من أجل العمل الشامل, romanized: ḥizb iʿādat at-taʾsīs min ajl alʿamal aš-šāmil French: Refondation pour une Action Globale) formerly known as the Radical Party for a Global Action (Note: Arabic: الحزب الراديكالي من أجل عمل شامل, romanized: al-ḥizb ar-rādikāli min ajl alʿamal aš-šāmil French: Parti Radical pour une Action Globale) and commonly referred to by its French acronym RAG (Arabic: الرگ or الرك), is a political party in Mauritania.

It has been connected since its inception to the anti-slavery Initiative for the Resurgence of the Abolitionist Movement (IRA) led by Biram Dah Abeid.

== History ==
The party was founded on 28 April 2013 by members of the Initiative for the Resurgence of the Abolitionist Movement (IRA) led by Biram Dah Abeid.

The party formed the Democratic Alternation Pole electoral coalition with Sawab on 31 May 2018 after failing to be legally registered as a political party by the Ministry of the Interior, thus not being allowed to field candidates under its own name.

== Electoral performance ==
President of the Islamic Republic of Mauritania
Election year	Candidate	1st round			2nd round			Result	Winning candidate
Election year	Candidate	Votes	%	Rank	Votes	%	Rank	Result	Winning candidate
2014	Biram Dah Abeid	61,218	8.67%	2nd	—N/a			Lost	Mohamed Ould Abdel Aziz
2019	Biram Dah Abeid	172,649	18.59%	2nd	—N/a			Lost	Mohamed Ould Ghazouani
2024	Biram Dah Abeid	218,427	22.10%	2nd	—N/a			Lost	Mohamed Ould Ghazouani

=== National Assembly ===
National Assembly
Election	Party leader	National list		Seats	+/–	Government
Election	Party leader	Votes	%	Seats	+/–	Government
2018	Biram Dah Abeid	Part of Sawab–RAG		2 / 157	▲2	Opposition
2023	Biram Dah Abeid	Part of Sawab–RAG		4 / 176	▲2	Opposition
