= Alliance for Justice and Democracy/Movement for Renewal =

Alliance for Justice and Democracy/Movement for Renewal Alliance pour la justice et la démocratie/ Mouvement pour la rénovation التحالف من أجل العدالة والديمقراطية / حركة التجديد
- Abbreviation: AJD/MR
- Leader: Mamadou Bocar Ba
- Founder: Ibrahima Moctar Sarr
- Founded: August 2007
- Ideology: Fulani interests
- National affiliation: Coalition Living Together
- Parliamentary group: Non-attached
- Colours: Black; White; Beige
- National Assembly: 4 / 176
- Regional councils: 3 / 285
- Mayors: 0 / 238

Website
- ajdmr.org

The Alliance for Justice and Democracy/Movement for Renewal (French: Alliance pour la justice et la démocratie/Mouvement pour la rénovation, AJD/MR; Arabic: التحالف من أجل العدالة والديمقراطية / حركة التجديد, romanized: at-taḥāluf min ajl al-ʿadāla wad-dīmuqrāṭiya / ḥarakat at-tajdīd) is a small political party in Mauritania. It represents the black minority population of the south of the country, centered on the Senegal River valley, and was formed and was led by rights activist and former presidential candidate Ibrahima Moctar Sarr.

The party's colors are black and white, and its symbol is a Zebu bull, livestock being associated with the traditionally pastoralist Fula people who make up much of its constituency.

== Founding ==
The party was founded in August 2007 by a merger of Ibrahima Moctar Sarr's Movement for National Reconciliation and the Alliance for Justice and Democracy (AJD) party, with Sarr elected as the leader of the new party. Sarr, a Fulani journalist, had been an activist since the 1980s, and his party defined itself as campaigning for equal rights for Pulaar-speakers, Soninké and Wolof people alongside Moors, and the return of Mauritanian refugees from Senegal. Sarr had stood as an independent in the March 2007 presidential election on an anti-racist platform, came in fifth place with 7.95% of the vote in the first round and supported Ahmed Ould Daddah for the second round.

== 2008 break with government ==
On May 10, 2008, the AJD/MR announced they would not participate in the government of Prime Minister Yahya Ould Ahmed El Waghef due to many policy differences.

== 2008 coup ==
Following the August 2008 military coup, Sarr and the AJD/MR expressed support for the military junta.

But on August 26, 2008, the AJD/MR, along with the Rally of Democratic Forces (RFD) and the Movement for Direct Democracy (MDD) all announced their decision to not participate in the Laghdaf's government because the junta had not clarified whether or not someone serving in the military would be allowed to stand as a presidential candidate and had not specified how long it intended to remain in power. The new government led by Laghdaf was appointed on August 31.

== 2009 elections ==
Sarr announced on 11 April 2009, that he would be the AJD/MR candidate in the controversial June 2009 presidential election, which was being organized by the military junta and which opposition parties were planning to boycott. Sarr said that "the conditions are there for a free poll" and that Mauritania did not have democracy under Abdallahi's presidency.
