= National Independent Election Commission =

- Arabic: اللجنة الوطنية المستقلة للإنتخابات; French: Commission électorale nationale indépendante

Agency overview
- Formed: November 14, 2005
- Type: Election commission
- Jurisdiction: Mauritania
- Status: Active
- Headquarters: Nouakchott, Mauritania
- Motto: For credible and transparent elections Arabic: من أجل إنتخابات شفافة وذات مصداقية; French: Pour des élections crédibles et transparentes
- Annual budget: 500 million MRU (2023)
- Agency executives: Dah Ould Abdel Jelil, President; Mohamed Lemine Ould Dahi, Vice-President
- Website: ceni.mr

The National Independent Election Commission (Arabic: اللجنة الوطنية المستقلة للإنتخابات, French: Commission électorale nationale indépendante, CENI) is the election commission of Mauritania. It is responsible for preparing, organising and supervising the entire electoral process.

== Objectives ==
The main objective of the commission is ensuring that the voting process is smooth, correct and transparent. The Electoral Commission has total independence to prepare, organise and supervise the entire electoral process, As part of its mission, the Electoral Commission has all the powers to prepare, organise and supervise the entire electoral process, not receiving any instructions from any public or private authorities or institutions.

As part of its objectives, the CENI:

- takes care of observing the principle of equal access for all competing candidates to the official organs of the written, audio and visual press, and on this basis it can direct any observation or recommendation to the competent authorities.
- participates in the media sector to educate citizens about the voting process.
- takes the necessary measures to facilitate the tasks of the national observers and the invited international observers in consultation with the competent diplomatic departments of the State.

== Organisation ==
=== Committee of Elders ===
The CENI is a collegial authority, with the Committee of Elders being its design, orientation and decision-making body. It has 11 members, nominated by both the government and the opposition. They have an irrevocable non-renewable term of five years.

This is the current composition of the Committee of Elders since 31 October 2022.

Name	Position	Nominated by
Mr. Dah Ould Abdel Jelil	President	Presidential majority
Mr. Mohamed Lemine Ould Dahi	Vice-president	RFD
Mr. Ebbe Ould Mbari	Member	APP
Mr. Babocar Souley	Member	Presidential majority
Mr. Baba Ould Boumeiss	Member	Presidential majority
Mr. Bilal Ould Werzeg	Member	Presidential majority
Ms. Djeinaba Tandia	Member	Presidential majority
Ms. Koumba Sy	Member	UFP
Ms. Lamina Mohamed Bouya Momme	Member	Presidential majority
Mr. Mohamed Mokhtar Melil	Member	Sawab
Mr. Moulaye Ould Brahim	Member	Tewassoul
Mr. Amadou Moussa Diallo	Secretary-General	Non-partisan

==== President of CENI ====
The President of the CENI is oldest member of the Committee of Elders and acts as the Head of Administration of the CENI. They have authority over all technical and administrative staff and are the authorising officer of the CENI budget.

=== Chambers ===
==== Juridic chamber ====
The legal chamber is responsible for assisting the Committee of Elders in the exercise of the legal powers of the CENI, with regard to administrative and financial matters, legal affairs and litigation. It gives a prior opinion on draft decisions of a legal nature.

==== Technical chamber ====
The Technical Chamber is responsible for assisting the Committee of Elders within the framework of the technical attributions of the CENI, with regard to questions relating to logistics, electoral material, electoral operations, communication and education. citizenship and relations with regional and local branches.

=== Regional and local branches ===
The CENI has regional and local branches in the regions, departments and districts whose attributions, organisation and functioning are determined by deliberation of the CENI Steering Committee.

The members of the regional and local branches are appointed, on the occasion of each election, by deliberation of the Committee of Elders of the CENI. Their functions end fifteen days after the proclamation of the final results of the corresponding election.
