= Sawab (Mauritania) =

Right Path Party حزب الصواب Parti Sawab
- President: Abdesselam Ould Horma
- Vice President: Mohamed El Moctar Ould Melil
- Founded: 23 May 2004
- Headquarters: Nouakchott
- Ideology: Ba'athism; Saddamism; Arab nationalism
- National affiliation: Sawab–RAG
- International affiliation: Ba'ath Party (Iraqi-dominated faction)
- Parliamentary group: Non-attached
- National Assembly: 1 / 176

Website
- Facebook profile

Sawab (Arabic: حزب الصواب, romanized: ḥizb aṣ-ṣawāb, lit. 'Party of the Right Path'), is a Ba'athist and Arab nationalist political party in Mauritania. The party leader is Abdesselam Ould Horma.

The party was formed and founded on 23 May 2004 by supporters of former Mauritanian Head of State Mohamed Khouna Ould Haidalla, although the party denies any links with Ould Haidalla.

Most of the party's Ba'athists were formerly associated with the Iraqi dominated faction. Support for the party is mainly confined to a small Arab group.

In 2013, the party was led by Abdesselam Ould Horma and was a member of the opposition Coalition for Pacific Alternation, along with People's Progressive Alliance and El-Wiam.

During the 2023 parliamentary elections, the Sawab party won five seats in the National Assembly; the party is still part of the opposition.

== See also ==
- National Vanguard Party
