= Democratic Alternation Pole =

Mauritanian political coalition

Democratic Alternation Pole قطب التناوب الديمقراطي Pôle de l'Alternance Démocratique
- Abbreviation: DAP
- Leader: Biram Dah Abeid
- Founded: 31 May 2018
- Headquarters: Nouakchott
- Ideology: Anti-establishment; Factions: Anti-slavery; Haratin interests Arab nationalism Ba'athism; Saddamism
- Parliamentary group: Non-attached
- Members: See composition
- National Assembly: 5 / 176
- Regional councils: 12 / 285
- Mayors: 1 / 238

Election symbol

The Democratic Alternation Pole (Arabic: قطب التناوب الديمقراطي, romanized: qiṭb at-tanāwwub ad-dīmuqrāṭi, French: Pôle de l'Alternance Démocratique) is a Mauritanian political coalition between Sawab and the legally unrecognized Refoundation for a Global Action parties founded on 31 May 2018 ahead of the 2018 parliamentary and 2019 presidential elections.

== History ==
The alliance was founded on 31 May 2018 as a pragmatic alliance between the Ba'athist Sawab and the Initiative for the Resurgence of the Abolitionist Movement (IRA) led by anti-slavery and Haratin interests activist Biram Dah Abeid, who saw his Refoundation for a Global Action (RAG) party legally unrecognized by the Ministry of Interior, thus not being allowed to contest elections on its own.

== Composition ==
Party	Leader
Sawab	Abdesselam Ould Horma
Refoundation for a Global Action (RAG)	Oumar Ould Yali
Organisations
Initiative for the Resurgence of the Abolitionist Movement (IRA)	Biram Dah Abeid

== Electoral performance ==
President of the Islamic Republic of Mauritania
Election year	Candidate	1st round			2nd round			Result	Winning candidate
Election year	Candidate	Votes	%	Rank	Votes	%	Rank	Result	Winning candidate
2019	Biram Dah Abeid	172,649	18.59%	2nd	—N/a			Lost	Mohamed Ould Ghazouani
2024	Biram Dah Abeid	218,427	22.10%	2nd	—N/a			Lost	Mohamed Ould Ghazouani

=== National Assembly ===
National Assembly
Election	Party leader	National list		Seats	+/–	Government
Election	Party leader	Votes	%	Seats	+/–	Government
2018	Biram Dah Abeid	12,265	1.75%	3 / 157	▲3	Opposition
2023	Biram Dah Abeid	39,807	4.10%	5 / 176	▲2	Opposition
