= People's Progressive Alliance (Mauritania) =

People's Progressive Alliance Alliance populaire progressiste
- President: Messoud Ould Boulkheir
- Headquarters: Nouakchott
- Ideology: Nasserism; Social democracy Haratin interests
- Political position: Centre-left
- Seats in the National Assembly: 0 / 176

Website
- APP website

The People's Progressive Alliance (French: Alliance populaire progressiste, APP) is a small political party in Mauritania.

The President of the APP is Messoud Ould Boulkheir, who was a candidate in the November 2003 presidential election, which was won by President Maaouya Ould Sid'Ahmed Taya.

After Taya's ouster in August 2005, Boulkheir stood as the APP candidate again in the March 2007 presidential election. In this election, held on March 11, he placed fourth, receiving 9.79% of the vote; he subsequently backed Sidi Ould Cheikh Abdallahi for the second round, despite the participation of the APP in the Coalition of the Forces for Democratic Change along with the other second round candidate, Ahmed Ould Daddah. Abdallahi won the election, and in April 2007, Boulkheir was elected as President of the National Assembly.

The APP won 5 seats in the National Assembly of Mauritania in the 2006 parliamentary election, along with another two seats won jointly with the Mauritanian Party for Union and Change (HATEM). In the government of Prime Minister Zeine Ould Zeidane, named in April 2007, three members of the APP were appointed as ministers. In the 21 January and 4 February 2007 Senate election, the APP won only one out of 56 seats.

On September 2, 2007, Boulkheir said that the APP would not join a new party being formed to support Abdallahi.

Following the August 2008 military coup d'état, the APP, along with the pro-Abdallahi National Pact for Democracy and Development (PNDD-ADIL), joined the four-party National Front for the Defense of Democracy, which opposed the coup.

As of 2023, the APP party has no representation in the Mauritanian Parliament, it has zero seats.
