= Elections in Mauritania =

Elections in Mauritania encompass four different types: presidential elections, parliamentary elections, regional elections and local elections.

This article only lists elections held after the introduction of multi-party politics with the 1991 Constitution, introduced after a referendum. During the authoritarian regime of Ould Daddah elections that were not up to democratic standards were held under a one-party state, while elections weren't held during a period of military junta rule after Mauritania's participation in the Western Sahara War.

Mauritania has a presidential election every five years, in which a president of Mauritania is elected in two rounds on the basis of a direct popular vote.

Parliamentary elections for the National Assembly are held every five years with a parallel voting system combining several national lists and an electoral district vote, with a two-round system used for one-seat districts, a general ticket used for two-seat districts, with larger districts using the proportional largest remainder method. Mauritania has a multi-party system with a dominant ruling party holding an absolute majority supported by several minor parties (with this bloc being referred to as the "presidential majority"). Mauritania has a high number of parties, with a peak of 105 parties running in 2018.

Regional and local elections are also held every five years (usually at the same time as parliamentary elections) to elect Mauritania's regional and local councils using a proportional largest remainder method. The presidency of said councils is held by the leader of the largest list in the election.

== Presidential elections ==
The president is elected by popular vote in a two-round system for a five-year term. The latest election was held on 22 June 2019, marking Mauritania's first peaceful transfer of power in the presidency. Mohamed Ould Ghazouani (UPR) won the election in the first round, securing 52% of votes.

- 2024 Mauritanian presidential election
- 2019 Mauritanian presidential election
- 2014 Mauritanian presidential election
- 2009 Mauritanian presidential election
- 2007 Mauritanian presidential election
- 2003 Mauritanian presidential election
- 1997 Mauritanian presidential election
- 1992 Mauritanian presidential election

== Parliamentary elections ==
Parliamentary elections are held to Mauritania's unicameral parliament, the National Assembly. The National Assembly is elected through a parallel voting system combining several national lists and an electoral district vote, with a two-round system used for one-seat districts, a general ticket used for two-seat districts, with larger districts using the proportional largest remainder method.

- 2023 Mauritanian parliamentary election
- 2018 Mauritanian parliamentary election
- 2013 Mauritanian parliamentary election
- 2006 Mauritanian parliamentary election
- 2001 Mauritanian parliamentary election
- 1996 Mauritanian parliamentary election
- 1992 Mauritanian parliamentary election

=== Senate elections ===
Mauritania's Parliament was bi-cameral between 1991 and 2017, with an indirectly elected upper house (the Senate) being abolished after a 2017 constitutional reform approved through a referendum. The Senate's term lasted six years, with one-third of the senators being renewed in indirect elections every two years.

- 2009 Mauritanian Senate election
- 2007 Mauritanian Senate election

== Regional elections ==
Regional councils were created in Mauritania to replace the Senate abolished in 2017. Regional elections are held every five years (usually at the same time as parliamentary elections) using a proportional largest remainder method. The presidency of the regional councils is held by the leader of the largest list in the election.

- 2023 Mauritanian regional elections
- 2018 Mauritanian regional elections

== Local elections ==
- 2023 Mauritanian local elections
- 2018 Mauritanian local elections
- 2013 Mauritanian local elections
- 2006 Mauritanian local elections
- 2001 Mauritanian local elections
- 1996 Mauritanian local elections
- 1991 Mauritanian local elections

== Referendums ==
- 2017 Mauritanian constitutional referendum
- 2006 Mauritanian constitutional referendum
- 1991 Mauritanian constitutional referendum

== Election organization ==
All elections are prepared, organized and supervised by the National Independent Election Commission (CENI), which:

- takes care of observing the principle of equal access for all competing candidates to the official organs of the written, audio and visual press, being allowed to direct any observation or recommendation to the competent authorities,
- participates in the media sector to educate citizens about the voting process,
- and takes the necessary measures to facilitate the tasks of the national observers and the invited international observers in consultation with the competent diplomatic departments of the State.

== See also ==
- Electoral calendar
- Electoral system
