= Oualata (National Assembly district) =

Constituency of the National Assembly of Mauritania

- electoral district for the National Assembly
- Location of Oualata within Mauritania.
- Moughataa: Oualata
- Wilaya: Hodh Ech Chargui
- Electorate: ▲8,850 (2023)

Current electoral district
- Seats: 1
- Party: El Insaf (1)
- Deputy: Sidi Cheikh Diajouh

Oualata (Arabic: ولاته) is one of the 60 electoral districts represented in the National Assembly. The constituency currently elects 1 deputy. Its boundaries correspond to those of the Mauritanian moughataa of Oualata. The electoral system uses the two-round system.

== Historic representation ==
| Election | Member | Party |
|---|---|---|
| 1992 | Sidaty Ould Deh | RDU |
| 1996 | Bolla Ould Baba Ahmed Ould Sidina | PRDS |
| 2001 | Bolla Ould Baba Ahmed Ould Sidina | PRDS |
| 2006 | Sidi Cheikh Diajouh | Independent |
| 2013 | Sidi Cheikh Diajouh | UPR |
| 2018 | Sidi Cheikh Diajouh | UPR |
| 2023 | Sidi Cheikh Diajouh | El Insaf |

== Election results ==
=== 2023 ===
Parliamentary Election 2023: Oualata
| Party | First round | | Second round | | Seats |
| Party | Votes | % | Votes | % | Seats |
|---|---|---|---|---|---|
| El Insaf | 2,468 | 45.09 | 3,329 | 55.33 | 1 |
| El Islah | 955 | 17.45 | 2,494 | 41.45 | 0 |
| Rally of Democratic Forces | 880 | 16.08 | | | 0 |
| Nida El Watan | 535 | 9.77 | | | 0 |
| El Ravah | 520 | 9.50 | | | 0 |
| El Karama | 34 | 0.62 | | | 0 |
| Blank votes | 82 | 1.50 | 194 | 3.22 | – |
| Total | 5,474 | 100.00 | 6,017 | 100.00 | 1 |
| Valid votes | 5,474 | 88.45 | 6,017 | 97.93 | |
| Invalid votes | 715 | 11.55 | 127 | 2.07 | |
| Total votes | 6,189 | 100.00 | 6,144 | 100.00 | |
| Registered voters/turnout | 8,850 | 69.93 | 8,850 | 69.42 | |
Source: National Independent Election Commission

=== 2018 ===
Parliamentary Election 2018: Oualata
| Party | Votes | % | Seats |
|---|---|---|---|
| Union for the Republic | 1,744 | 56.60 | 1 |
| Union for Democracy and Progress | 943 | 30.61 | 0 |
| National Rally for Reform and Development | 245 | 7.95 | 0 |
| Democratic Concertation Party | 56 | 1.82 | 0 |
| National Democratic Alliance | 26 | 0.84 | 0 |
| National Democratic Convergence | 24 | 0.78 | 0 |
| El Islah | 18 | 0.58 | 0 |
| Blank votes | 25 | 0.81 | – |
| Total | 3,081 | 100.00 | 1 |
| Valid votes | 3,081 | 92.03 | |
| Invalid votes | 267 | 7.97 | |
| Total votes | 3,348 | 100.00 | |
| Registered voters/turnout | 5,031 | 66.55 | |
Source: National Independent Election Commission

=== 2013 ===
Parliamentary Election 2013: Oualata
| Party | First round | | Second round | | Seats |
| Party | Votes | % | Votes | % | Seats |
|---|---|---|---|---|---|
| Union for the Republic | 1,948 | 46.19 | 2,403 | 50.17 | 1 |
| El Wiam | 1,911 | 45.32 | 2,363 | 49.33 | 0 |
| People's Progressive Alliance | 143 | 3.39 | | | 0 |
| El Ravah | 84 | 1.99 | | | 0 |
| El Vadila | 49 | 1.16 | | | 0 |
| Mauritanian Wava Party | 35 | 0.83 | | | 0 |
| Sawab | 30 | 0.71 | | | 0 |
| Blank votes | 17 | 0.40 | 24 | 0.50 | – |
| Total | 4,217 | 100.00 | 4,790 | 100.00 | 1 |
| Valid votes | 4,217 | 94.28 | 4,790 | 96.96 | |
| Invalid votes | 256 | 5.72 | 150 | 3.04 | |
| Total votes | 4,473 | 100.00 | 4,940 | 100.00 | |
| Registered voters/turnout | 5,796 | 77.17 | 5,796 | 85.23 | |
Source: National Independent Election Commission

=== 2006 ===
Parliamentary Election 2006: Oualata
| Party | First round | | Second round | | Seats |
| Party | Votes | % | Votes | % | Seats |
|---|---|---|---|---|---|
| Independent list: Welfare and Progress | 929 | 30.07 | | | 1 |
| Rally for Democracy and Unity | 571 | 18.48 | | | 0 |
| Independent list: Victory | 452 | 14.63 | | | 0 |
| Rally of Democratic Forces | 319 | 10.33 | | | 0 |
| Social Democratic Party | 298 | 9.65 | | | 0 |
| Sawab | 189 | 6.12 | | | 0 |
| Democratic Renovation | 166 | 5.37 | | | 0 |
| Mauritanian Party of Union and Change | 97 | 3.14 | | | 0 |
| Alternative | 42 | 1.36 | | | 0 |
| Blank votes | 26 | 0.84 | | | – |
| Total | 3,089 | 100.00 | | | 1 |
| Valid votes | 3,089 | 93.72 | | | |
| Invalid votes | 207 | 6.28 | | | |
| Total votes | 3,296 | 100.00 | | | |
| Registered voters/turnout | 4,412 | 74.71 | 4,412 | – | |
Source: Mauritanian News Agency
