= N'Beiket Lahwach (National Assembly district) =

Constituency of the National Assembly of Mauritania

- electoral district for the National Assembly
- Location of N'Beiket Lahwach within Mauritania.
- Moughataa: N'Beiket Lahwach
- Wilaya: Hodh Ech Chargui
- Electorate: ▲8,497 (2023)

Current electoral district
- Created: 2013
- Seats: 1
- Party: El Insaf (1)
- Deputy: Salek Dah Ene
- Created from: Oualata

N'Beiket Lahwach (Arabic: انبيكت لحواش) is one of the 60 electoral districts represented in the National Assembly. The constituency currently elects 1 deputy. Its boundaries correspond to those of the Mauritanian moughataa of N'Beiket Lahwach. The electoral system uses the two-round system.

== Historic representation ==
Election	Member	Party
2013	Yarbe El Mane Elemine	PSJN
2018	Salek Dah Ene	UPR
2023	Salek Dah Ene	El Insaf

== Election results ==
=== 2023 ===
Parliamentary Election 2023: N'Beiket Lahwach
Party	Votes	%	Seats
El Insaf	3,206	52.05	1
Union for Democracy and Progress	2,823	45.84	0
National Democratic Alliance	48	0.78	0
El Vadila	32	0.52	0
Blank votes	50	0.81	–
Total	6,159	100.00	1
Valid votes	6,159	95.05	
Invalid votes	321	4.95	
Total votes	6,480	100.00	
Registered voters/turnout	8,497	76.26	
Source: National Independent Election Commission

=== 2018 ===
Parliamentary Election 2018: N'Beiket Lahwach
Party	Votes	%	Seats
Union for the Republic	2,090	57.86	1
National Democratic Alliance	1,388	38.43	0
Rally of Democratic Forces	102	2.82	0
Blank votes	32	0.89	–
Total	3,612	100.00	1
Valid votes	3,612	92.76	
Invalid votes	282	7.24	
Total votes	3,894	100.00	
Registered voters/turnout	5,061	76.94	
Source: National Independent Election Commission

=== 2013 ===
Parliamentary Election 2018: N'Beiket Lahwach
Party	Votes	%	Seats
Burst of Youth for the Nation	2,300	51.70	1
Union for the Republic	2,088	46.93	0
People's Progressive Alliance	52	1.17	0
Blank votes	9	0.20	–
Total	4,449	100.00	1
Valid votes	4,449	93.70	
Invalid votes	299	6.30	
Total votes	4,748	100.00	
Registered voters/turnout	6,605	71.88	
Source: National Independent Election Commission
