= Tichitt (National Assembly district) =

- Electoral district for the National Assembly
- Departments: Tichitt
- Wilaya: Tagant
- Electorate: ▼2,471 (2018)
- Major settlements: Tichitt

Current Electoral district
- Created: 2013
- Seats: 1
- Party: UPR (1)
- Member(s): Bouya Ahmed Chrif Chrif El Moctar (UPR)

Tichitt is one of the districts (Arabic: دوائر إنتخابية) represented in the National Assembly, the unicameral chamber of the Parliament of Mauritania. The district currently elects one deputy using a two-round system. Its boundaries correspond to those of the department of Tichitt, in the wilaya of Tagant.

== Historic representation ==
Historic composition of the constituency
Key to parties UPR
Legislature	Election	Distribution
10th	2013	1
11th	2018	1

== Election results ==
=== 2018 ===
Party	First round		Second round	
Party	Votes	%	Votes	%
Union for the Republic (UPR)	1,408	82.53		
El Islah	277	16.24		
Blank votes	21	1.23		
Votes	1,706	100.00		
Valid votes	1,706	95.15		
Null votes	87	4.85		
Turnout	1,793	72.56		
Abstentions	678	27.44		
Registered voters	2,471			
Union for the Republic hold				
Source: Independent National Electoral Commission

=== 2013 ===
Party	First round		Second round	
Party	Votes	%	Votes	%
Union for the Republic (UPR)	1,567	51.03		
El Wiam	1,494	48.65		
Blank votes	10	0.32		
Votes	3,814	100.00		
Valid votes	3,071	97.68		
Null votes	73	2.32		
Turnout	3,144	89.24		
Abstentions	379	10.76		
Registered voters	3,523			
Union for the Republic gain				
Source: Independent National Electoral Commission
