= 2018 Mauritanian regional elections =

First elections to regional councils in Mauritania

| 1 September 2018 (first round); 15 September 2018 (second round) | 2023 → |
- 283 seats in 13 regional councils
- Turnout: 1,020,115 (72.62%, first round)
| Party | Seats |
|---|---|
| UPR | 167 |
| Tewassoul | 29 |
| UDP | 24 |
| HATEM–Tewassoul | 21 |
| FNDU | 18 |
| AJD/MR–Tewassoul | 5 |
| El Vadila | 2 |
| UFP–Tewassoul | 2 |
| El Karama | 2 |
| Tewassoul–RDU | 2 |
| PTG | 2 |
| AJD/MR | 1 |
| APP | 1 |
| Sawab–RAG | 1 |
| RFD | 1 |
| AND | 1 |
| APP–El Wiam | 1 |
| UFP–Sawab–RAG | 1 |
| El Wiam | 1 |
| APP–AND | 1 |
This lists parties that won seats. See the complete results below.
Control of regional administrations after the election
UPR-led government

Regional elections were held in Mauritania on 1 and 15 September 2018, alongside parliamentary and local elections. They were the first elections to the newly created regional councils.

== Background ==
Regional councils were created in Mauritania following a 2017 constitutional referendum that abolished the Senate, replacing it with regional councils in every wilaya and a single one for the city of Nouakchott.

== Election system ==
Regional councils in Mauritania are elected using the proportional representation system of the largest remainder method with two rounds. In the first round, voters choose from one of several lists running. If one list obtains an absolute majority of votes, the council seats would be then distributed proportionally. If not, a second round must be held between the two largest lists. The president of the Regional Council is elected by the Regional Council from one of their members.

== Regional governments ==
The following table lists party control in each regional council after the election.

| Region | New control |
|---|---|
| Adrar | Union for the Republic (UPR) |
| Assaba | Union for the Republic (UPR) |
| Brakna | Union for the Republic (UPR) |
| Dakhlet Nouadhibou | Union for the Republic (UPR) |
| Gorgol | Union for the Republic (UPR) |
| Guidimaka | Union for the Republic (UPR) |
| Hodh Ech Chargui | Union for the Republic (UPR) |
| Hodh El Gharbi | Union for the Republic (UPR) |
| Inchiri | Union for the Republic (UPR) |
| Nouakchott | Union for the Republic (UPR) |
| Tagant | Union for the Republic (UPR) |
| Tiris Zemmour | Union for the Republic (UPR) |
| Trarza | Union for the Republic (UPR) |

== Summary by region ==
=== Adrar ===
| Party | Votes | % | Seats |
|---|---|---|---|
| UPR | 17,925 | 60.35 | 9 |
| Tewassoul–RDU | 4,227 | 14.23 | 2 |
| PTG | 2,716 | 9.14 | 2 |
| APP–El Wiam | 1,637 | 5.51 | 1 |
| UFP–Sawab–RAG | 1,156 | 3.89 | 1 |
| Other parties | 1,323 | 4.45 | 0 |
| Blank votes | 720 | 2.42 | – |
| Total | 29,704 | 100.00 | 15 |
| Valid votes | 29,704 | 86.61 | |
| Invalid votes | 4,593 | 13.39 | |
| Total votes | 34,297 | 100.00 | |
| Registered voters/turnout | 45,595 | 75.22 | |
Source: CENI, DGCT (seat share)

=== Assaba ===
| Party | First round | | Second round | | Seats |
| Party | Votes | % | Votes | % | Seats |
|---|---|---|---|---|---|
| UPR | 37,807 | 49.56 | | | 16 |
| HATEM–Tewassoul | 13,852 | 18.16 | | | 9 |
| AND | 7,900 | 10.35 | | | 0 |
| PPPD | 6,495 | 8.51 | | | 0 |
| El Ravah | 3,926 | 5.15 | | | 0 |
| Other parties | 5,019 | 6.58 | | | 0 |
| Blank votes | 1,294 | 1.70 | | | – |
| Total | 76,293 | 100.00 | | | 25 |
| Valid votes | 76,293 | 75.17 | | | |
| Invalid votes | 25,206 | 24.83 | | | |
| Total votes | 101,499 | 100.00 | | | |
| Registered voters/turnout | 133,813 | 75.85 | 133,813 | – | |
Source: CENI (first round), DGCT (seat share)

=== Brakna ===
| Party | Votes | % | Seats |
|---|---|---|---|
| UPR | 49,164 | 56.01 | 14 |
| Tewassoul | 11,749 | 13.39 | 3 |
| El Vadila | 6,568 | 7.48 | 2 |
| AJD/MR | 4,829 | 5.50 | 1 |
| APP | 3,797 | 4.33 | 1 |
| Sawab–RAG | 2,313 | 2.64 | 1 |
| RFD | 2,077 | 2.37 | 1 |
| AND | 1,945 | 2.22 | 1 |
| El Karama | 1,624 | 1.85 | 1 |
| Other parties | 1,600 | 1.82 | 0 |
| Blank votes | 2,108 | 2.40 | – |
| Total | 87,774 | 100.00 | 25 |
| Valid votes | 87,774 | 79.72 | |
| Invalid votes | 22,332 | 20.28 | |
| Total votes | 110,106 | 100.00 | |
| Registered voters/turnout | 148,744 | 74.02 | |
Source: CENI, DGCT (seat share)

=== Dakhlet Nouadhibou ===
| Party | First round | | Second round | | Seats |
| Party | Votes | % | Votes | % | Seats |
|---|---|---|---|---|---|
| UPR | 11,625 | 34.93 | | | 11 |
| Tewassoul | 5,959 | 17.90 | | | 8 |
| AJD/MR | 2,667 | 8.01 | | | 0 |
| UDP | 2,408 | 7.23 | | | 0 |
| El Islah | 1,972 | 5.92 | | | 0 |
| Other parties | 7,540 | 22.65 | | | 0 |
| Blank votes | 1,112 | 3.34 | | | – |
| Total | 33,283 | 100.00 | | | 19 |
| Valid votes | 33,283 | 83.34 | | | |
| Invalid votes | 6,652 | 16.66 | | | |
| Total votes | 39,935 | 100.00 | | | |
| Registered voters/turnout | 63,681 | 62.71 | 63,681 | – | |
Source: CENI (first round), DGCT (seat share)

=== Gorgol ===
| Party | First round | | Second round | | Seats |
| Party | Votes | % | Votes | % | Seats |
|---|---|---|---|---|---|
| UPR | 18,181 | 29.68 | | | 16 |
| UDP | 11,338 | 18.51 | | | 9 |
| El Karama | 8,253 | 13.47 | | | 0 |
| UFP | 3,165 | 5.17 | | | 0 |
| Other parties | 18,619 | 30.39 | | | 0 |
| Blank votes | 1,711 | 2.79 | | | – |
| Total | 61,267 | 100.00 | | | 25 |
| Valid votes | 61,267 | 72.30 | | | |
| Invalid votes | 23,471 | 27.70 | | | |
| Total votes | 84,738 | 100.00 | | | |
| Registered voters/turnout | 108,319 | 78.23 | 108,319 | – | |
Source: CENI (first round), DGCT (seat share)

=== Guidimaka ===
| Party | First round | | Second round | | Seats |
| Party | Votes | % | Votes | % | Seats |
|---|---|---|---|---|---|
| UPR | 13,476 | 35.42 | | | 14 |
| UDP | 7,776 | 20.44 | | | 11 |
| Tewassoul | 4,034 | 10.60 | | | 0 |
| El Vadila | 3,003 | 7.89 | | | 0 |
| UFP–Sawab–RAG | 2,179 | 5.73 | | | 0 |
| Other parties | 6,321 | 16.62 | | | 0 |
| Blank votes | 1,252 | 3.29 | | | – |
| Total | 38,041 | 100.00 | | | 25 |
| Valid votes | 38,041 | 63.91 | | | |
| Invalid votes | 21,481 | 36.09 | | | |
| Total votes | 59,522 | 100.00 | | | |
| Registered voters/turnout | 72,946 | 81.60 | 72,946 | – | |
Source: CENI (first round), DGCT (seat share)

=== Hodh Ech Chargui ===
| Party | First round | | Second round | | Seats |
| Party | Votes | % | Votes | % | Seats |
|---|---|---|---|---|---|
| UPR | 33,745 | 40.90 | | | 17 |
| Tewassoul | 10,426 | 12.64 | | | 8 |
| PUCM | 9,795 | 11.87 | | | 0 |
| UDP | 7,057 | 8.55 | | | 0 |
| El Karama | 5,056 | 6.13 | | | 0 |
| Other parties | 13,714 | 16.62 | | | 0 |
| Blank votes | 2,710 | 3.28 | | | – |
| Total | 82,503 | 100.00 | | | 25 |
| Valid votes | 82,503 | 71.38 | | | |
| Invalid votes | 33,073 | 28.62 | | | |
| Total votes | 115,576 | 100.00 | | | |
| Registered voters/turnout | 159,990 | 72.24 | 159,990 | – | |
Source: CENI (first round), DGCT (seat share)

=== Hodh El Gharbi ===
| Party | First round | | Second round | | Seats |
| Party | Votes | % | Votes | % | Seats |
|---|---|---|---|---|---|
| UPR | 31,252 | 39.99 | | | 13 |
| HATEM–Tewassoul | 15,418 | 19.73 | | | 12 |
| UDP | 7,939 | 10.16 | | | 0 |
| El Wiam | 6,137 | 7.85 | | | 0 |
| HIWAR | 4,195 | 5.37 | | | 0 |
| Other parties | 11,782 | 15.07 | | | 0 |
| Blank votes | 1,434 | 1.83 | | | – |
| Total | 78,157 | 100.00 | | | 25 |
| Valid votes | 78,157 | 78.05 | | | |
| Invalid votes | 21,986 | 21.95 | | | |
| Total votes | 100,143 | 100.00 | | | |
| Registered voters/turnout | 126,565 | 79.12 | 126,565 | – | |
Source: CENI (first round), DGCT (seat share)

=== Inchiri ===
| Party | Votes | % | Seats |
|---|---|---|---|
| UPR | 7,187 | 63.23 | 7 |
| Tewassoul | 1,331 | 11.71 | 2 |
| El Karama | 1,293 | 11.38 | 1 |
| El Wiam | 743 | 6.54 | 1 |
| Other parties | 614 | 5.40 | 0 |
| Blank votes | 198 | 1.74 | – |
| Total | 11,366 | 100.00 | 11 |
| Valid votes | 11,366 | 90.13 | |
| Invalid votes | 1,244 | 9.87 | |
| Total votes | 12,610 | 100.00 | |
| Registered voters/turnout | 17,584 | 71.71 | |
Source: CENI, DGCT (seat share)

=== Nouakchott ===
| Party | First round | | Second round | | Seats |
| Party | Votes | % | Votes | % | Seats |
|---|---|---|---|---|---|
| UPR | 34,104 | 23.79 | 50,435 | 49.09 | 19 |
| FNDU | 32,281 | 22.52 | 48,188 | 46.90 | 18 |
| RFD | 9,737 | 6.79 | | | 0 |
| Sawab–RAG | 8,442 | 5.89 | | | 0 |
| Other parties | 54,057 | 37.70 | | | 0 |
| Blank votes | 4,749 | 3.31 | 4,114 | 4.00 | – |
| Total | 143,370 | 100.00 | 102,737 | 100.00 | 37 |
| Valid votes | 143,370 | 80.22 | 102,737 | 89.81 | |
| Invalid votes | 35,350 | 19.78 | 11,654 | 10.19 | |
| Total votes | 178,720 | 100.00 | 114,391 | 100.00 | |
| Registered voters/turnout | 280,627 | 63.69 | 280,627 | 40.76 | |
Source: CENI (first round), AMI (second round), DGCT (seat share)

=== Tagant ===
| Party | Votes | % | Seats |
|---|---|---|---|
| UPR | 17,876 | 56.74 | 8 |
| UDP | 7,558 | 23.99 | 4 |
| UFP–Tewassoul | 4,462 | 14.16 | 2 |
| APP–AND | 1,284 | 4.08 | 1 |
| Blank votes | 326 | 1.03 | – |
| Total | 31,506 | 100.00 | 15 |
| Valid votes | 31,506 | 90.45 | |
| Invalid votes | 3,325 | 9.55 | |
| Total votes | 34,831 | 100.00 | |
| Registered voters/turnout | 44,844 | 77.67 | |
Source: CENI, DGCT (seat share)

=== Tiris Zemmour ===
| Party | First round | | Second round | | Seats |
| Party | Votes | % | Votes | % | Seats |
|---|---|---|---|---|---|
| UPR | 6,031 | 36.80 | | | 6 |
| AJD/MR–Tewassoul | 3,681 | 22.46 | | | 5 |
| APP–El Wiam–RIBAT | 2,144 | 13.08 | | | 0 |
| El Islah | 893 | 5.45 | | | 0 |
| Other parties | 3,219 | 19.64 | | | 0 |
| Blank votes | 420 | 2.56 | | | – |
| Total | 16,388 | 100.00 | | | 11 |
| Valid votes | 16,388 | 88.88 | | | |
| Invalid votes | 2,051 | 11.12 | | | |
| Total votes | 18,439 | 100.00 | | | |
| Registered voters/turnout | 25,078 | 73.53 | 25,078 | – | |
Source: CENI (first round), DGCT (seat share)

=== Trarza ===
| Party | First round | | Second round | | Seats |
| Party | Votes | % | Votes | % | Seats |
|---|---|---|---|---|---|
| UPR | 50,193 | 54.15 | | | 17 |
| Tewassoul | 3,681 | 3.97 | | | 8 |
| El Wiam | 8,264 | 8.92 | | | 0 |
| RFD | 6,335 | 6.83 | | | 0 |
| Other parties | 22,401 | 24.17 | | | 0 |
| Blank votes | 1,822 | 1.97 | | | – |
| Total | 92,696 | 100.00 | | | 25 |
| Valid votes | 92,696 | 83.20 | | | |
| Invalid votes | 18,716 | 16.80 | | | |
| Total votes | 111,412 | 100.00 | | | |
| Registered voters/turnout | 176,948 | 62.96 | 176,948 | – | |
Source: CENI (first round), DGCT (seat share)
