= 2023 Nouadhibou local election =

| ← 2018 | 13 May 2023 | 2028 → |
- All 21 seats in the Municipal Council of Nouadhibou; 11 seats needed for a majority
- Turnout: 72.76% (▲5.4pp)
| Party | Leader | Vote % | Seats | +/– |
|---|---|---|---|---|
| El Karama | El Ghassem Ould Bellali | 28.83 | 6 | −6 |
| El Insaf | Ahmed Ould Khattry | 23.34 | 5 | −4 |
| AJD/MR | Louise Lindor Ly | 7.00 | 2 | +2 |
| RFD–UFP | El Moctar Ould Sidiya | 5.99 | 1 | +1 |
| Tewassoul | Cheikh Lekbir Ould Bousseif | 5.94 | 1 | +1 |
| Sawab–RAG | M. Mahmoud Ould Sidibe | 5.27 | 1 | +1 |
| Hope MR | El Maaloum Ould Hemedy | 4.56 | 1 | +1 |
| HATEM | Mohamed Ould Lebrahim | 2.71 | 1 | +1 |
| HIWAR | El Meimoum Ould Ethmane | 1.80 | 1 | +1 |
| UDP | Abou Samba Dia | 1.77 | 1 | +1 |
| El Islah | Bettar Ould Abdellahi | 1.58 | 1 | +1 |
This lists parties that won seats. See the complete results below.
| Mayor before | Mayor after |
|---|---|
| El Ghassem Ould Bellali; El Karama | El Ghassem Ould Bellali; El Karama |

Local elections were held on 13 May 2023 to elect the 21 members of the Municipal Council of Nouadhibou, as part of the 2023 Mauritanian local elections.

Mayor El Ghassem Ould Bellali was re-elected with a two-point increase on his party El Karama's vote share compared to the first round of the 2018 local election.

== Election system ==
On 26 September 2022 all Mauritanian political parties reached an agreement sponsored by the Ministry of Interior and Decentralisation to reform the election system ahead of the upcoming elections after weeks of meetings between all parties.

In this election, local councils will be elected in a single round using proportional representation through the largest remainder method, with no threshold being applied. The head of the list that gets the most votes will automatically become mayor of the city council.

== Results ==
Local Election 2023: Nouadhibou
| Party | Lead candidate | Votes | % | Seats |
|---|---|---|---|---|
| El Karama | El Ghassem Bellali Bellali | 8,991 | 28.83 | 6 |
| El Insaf | Ahmed Khattry Khattry | 7,278 | 23.34 | 5 |
| Alliance for Justice and Democracy/Movement for Renewal | Louise Lindor Dethi Souleimane Ly | 2,182 | 7.00 | 2 |
| Rally of Democratic Forces and Union of the Forces of Progress | El Moctar Cheikh Sidiya | 1,869 | 5.99 | 1 |
| National Rally for Reform and Development | Cheikh Lekbir Alioune Bousseif | 1,852 | 5.94 | 1 |
| Democratic Alternation Pole (Sawab–RAG) | Mohamed Mahmoud Boilil Sidibe | 1,645 | 5.27 | 1 |
| Hope Mauritania | El Maaloum Aoubeck Hemedy | 1,423 | 4.56 | 1 |
| Mauritanian Party of Union and Change | Mohamed Dah Ahmed Lebrahim | 845 | 2.71 | 1 |
| Party of Conciliation and Prosperity | El Meimoun Ahmed Taleb Ethmane | 560 | 1.80 | 1 |
| Union for Democracy and Progress | Abou Samba Dia | 551 | 1.77 | 1 |
| El Islah | Bettar Elarby Abdellahi | 494 | 1.58 | 1 |
| People's Progressive Alliance | M'Boiricka Amar M'Haimid | 463 | 1.48 | 0 |
| National Democratic Alliance | Taghy Brahim Gharayna | 434 | 1.39 | 0 |
| National Cohesion for Rights and the Construction of Generations | Bamba Abdellahi Soueidatt | 333 | 1.07 | 0 |
| El Ravah | Djibril Sandigui Ba | 329 | 1.05 | 0 |
| Burst of Youth for the Nation | Mohamed El Hacen Ehaimed | 253 | 0.81 | 0 |
| Party of Construction and Progress | Hamidou Harouna N'Diaye | 227 | 0.73 | 0 |
| Party of Unity and Development | Zid Bih Sidi Brahim Ahmedy | 215 | 0.69 | 0 |
| Party of the Mauritanian Masses | El Hadrami Chighaly El Kory | 163 | 0.52 | 0 |
| Centre through Action for Progress | Hassen Alioune Mohamed El Abd | 137 | 0.44 | 0 |
| El Vadila | Amadou Souweidi Toubelle | 128 | 0.41 | 0 |
| Blank votes | | 814 | 2.61 | – |
| Total | | 31,186 | 100.00 | 21 |
| Valid votes | | 31,186 | 88.34 | |
| Invalid votes | | 4,116 | 11.66 | |
| Total votes | | 35,302 | 100.00 | |
| Registered voters/turnout | | 48,518 | 72.76 | |
Source: National Independent Election Commission

== See also ==
- 2023 Mauritanian parliamentary election
- 2023 Mauritanian regional elections
