= Democratic People's Party (Mauritania) =

Political party in Mauritania

The Democratic People's Party (French: Parti du Peuple Démocratique, PPD) is a minor political party in Mauritania.

== History ==
The party won one seat in the 2013 parliamentary elections. It failed to win a seat in the 2018 elections and did not contest the 2023 elections.
