= Al-Mithaq =

Al-Mithaq is the collective name for coalition of independents and parties associated with the former regime in Mauritania. Al-Mithaq won in the 19 November and 3 December 2006 National Assembly election 41 out of 95 seats and in the 21 January and 4 February 2007 Senate election 34 out of 56 seats.

On January 28, 2007, Al-Mithaq announced its support for Sidi Ould Cheikh Abdallahi in the March 2007 presidential election.

== See also ==
- Mauritanian parliamentary election, 2006
- Mauritanian Senate election, 2007
- Sidi Ould Cheikh Abdallahi
- Senate of Mauritania
