= Party of Mauritanian Authenticity =

Political party in Mauritania

The Party of Mauritanian Authenticity (French: Parti de l’Authenticité Mauritanienne, PAM) is a minor political party in Mauritania. It is led by Mohamed Mahmoud El Gharachi.

== History ==
The party won one seat in the 2013 parliamentary elections. It failed to win a seat in the 2018 elections and did not contest the 2023 elections.
