= Party of Dignity and Action =

Political party in Mauritania

The Dignity and Action Party (French: Parti Dignité et Action, PDA) is a minor political party in Mauritania.

== History ==
The party won one seat in the 2013 parliamentary elections. It failed to win a seat in the 2018 elections and did not contest the 2023 elections.
