= Khadijatou Bint Ahmed =

Mauritanian politician

Khadijatou Bint Ahmed, sometimes known as Khadija Mint Ahmed Aïche, is a Mauritanian politician, who in 1987, as Minister of Mines and Industry, became the country's first woman Cabinet Minister.

She is a native of Boutilimit.

In 1987, Mauritania's President, Maaouya Ould Sid'Ahmed Taya, named three women to cabinet-level posts to "correct countless managerial mistakes committed in the past". Bint Ahmed Aiche was appointed Minister of Mines and Industries, Lalla Mariam Bint Moulaye was appointed associate Director of the presidential cabinet, and N'Deye Tabar Fall became General-Secretary of the Ministry of Health and Social Affairs. Her tenure lasted until 1990.

Speaking to the Inter Press Service, Abass Braham, a blogger and social critic, said, "It seems a long way since the country got its first woman minister in the person of Khadijatou Bint Ahmed in 1987. Since then, the rapid pace of urbanization and increased outside influence that came with economic modernization made it possible to question and even challenge customary behavior patterns in some parts of the country. The expansion of modernization meant that traditional nomadic customs were subjected to close scrutiny ... Thus, you see many women doing business or other jobs traditionally reserved for men."
