= Lalla Mariam Bint Moulaye Idriss =

Mauritanian politician

- Born: 1957 (age 68–69); Ayon El Atrous
- Citizenship: Mauritania
- Education: Doctorate degree in financial engineering
- Occupation: Politician
- Known for: Ran in 2014 presidential election as the only female candidate
- Notable work: In 2097, led the counsel d' Administration de L' Agence
- Children: 4

Lalla Mariam Bint Moulaye Idriss (Arabic: لالة مريم بنت مولاي إدريس; born in 1957) is a Mauritanian politician. Born in Ayoun el Atrous, she began her studies in that town before continuing them in Nouakchott, eventually gaining a doctoral degree in financial engineering.

In 1987, President Maaouya Ould Sid'Ahmed Taya, desiring to "correct countless managerial mistakes committed in the past", named Idriss as one of three women appointed to the cabinet, in which she served as Associate Director of the presidential cabinet. The other two were Khadijatou Bint Ahmed, who as Minister of Mines and Industry became the first woman cabinet Minister in the country's history, and N'Deye Tabar Fall, who became the General-Secretary of the Ministry of Health and Social Affairs. She served in the role until 1995.

Beginning in 2007, she led the Conseil d’Administration de L’Agence mauritanienne d’information, the official information agency of Mauritania.

She ran in the 2014 presidential election, in which she was the only female candidate; at the time she had already spent more than twenty years of her career in government service. Her platform was focused largely on bringing more visibility to issues affecting women in Mauritania. During the campaign, she admitted that total transparency was impossible to achieve given the constrictions of Mauritanian society and the influence of tribal elders on the political system. Ultimately, she came in last in the election, in which she ran as an independent. Idriss is married, and she has four children.
