= 2023 Mauritanian local elections =

- 13 May 2023 (Note: Delayed in R'Kiz Department until municipal boundaries are delimited.)

235 local councils (Note: (excluding 55 seats in 3 local councils in R'Kiz))

Local elections were held in Mauritania on 13 May 2023, alongside parliamentary and regional elections.

The elections were the first local elections held after the first peaceful transition of power in the country as a result of the 2019 presidential elections, in which Mohamed Ould Ghazouani was elected president after incumbent Mohamed Ould Abdel Aziz was not able to run due to the two-term constitutional limit.

== Background ==
On 26 September 2022 an agreement between the Ministry of the Interior and Decentralisation and all political parties registered in Mauritania was reached in order to renew the Independent National Electoral Commission and hold the elections in the first semester of 2023, with parties justifying it due to climatic and logistical conditions.

On 8 May 2023 the Administrative Chamber of the Supreme Court suspended the local elections in the R'Kiz Department of the Trarza Region due to unclear municipal border delimitations, with the election being "suspended in these municipalities until an organizational text is issued that enables the residents of these villages to exercise their constitutionally guaranteed electoral right by demarcating them within the borders of one of the county’s municipalities".

== Election system ==
On 26 September 2022 all Mauritanian political parties reached an agreement sponsored by the Ministry of Interior and Decentralisation to reform the election system ahead of the upcoming elections after weeks of meetings between all parties.

In this election, local councils will be elected in a single round using proportional representation through the largest remainder method, with no threshold being applied. The head of the list that gets the most votes will automatically become mayor.

== See also ==
- 2023 Nouadhibou local election
