= National Rally for Democracy, Liberty and Equality =

Political party in Mauritania

The National Rally for Democracy, Liberty and Equality (Rassemblement national pour la liberté, la démocratie et l'égalité) is a political party in Mauritania. The party won in the 19 November and 3 December 2006 elections 1 out of 95 seats.
