= N'Deye Tabar Fall =

Mauritanian politician

N'Deye Tabar Fall is a Mauritanian politician. She was one of three women named to the cabinet in 1987 by President Maaouya Ould Sid'Ahmed Taya, desiring to "correct countless managerial mistakes committed in the past". She became the General-Secretary of the Ministry of Health and Social Affairs; Khadijatou Bint Ahmed was named Minister of Mines and Industry, becoming the first woman to hold a cabinet post in the country's history, while Lalla Mariam Bint Moulaye Idriss was named Associate Director of the presidential cabinet.
