= 2014 Mauritanian presidential election =

← 2009	21 June 2014	2019 →
- Registered: 1,328,168
- Turnout: 56.46% (▼5.05pp)
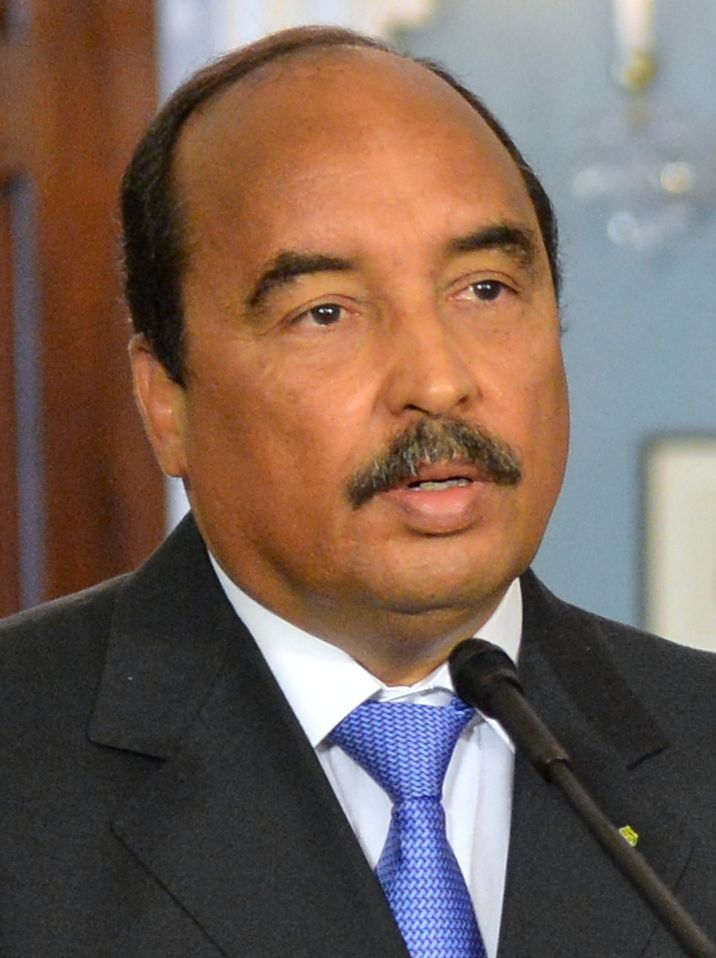

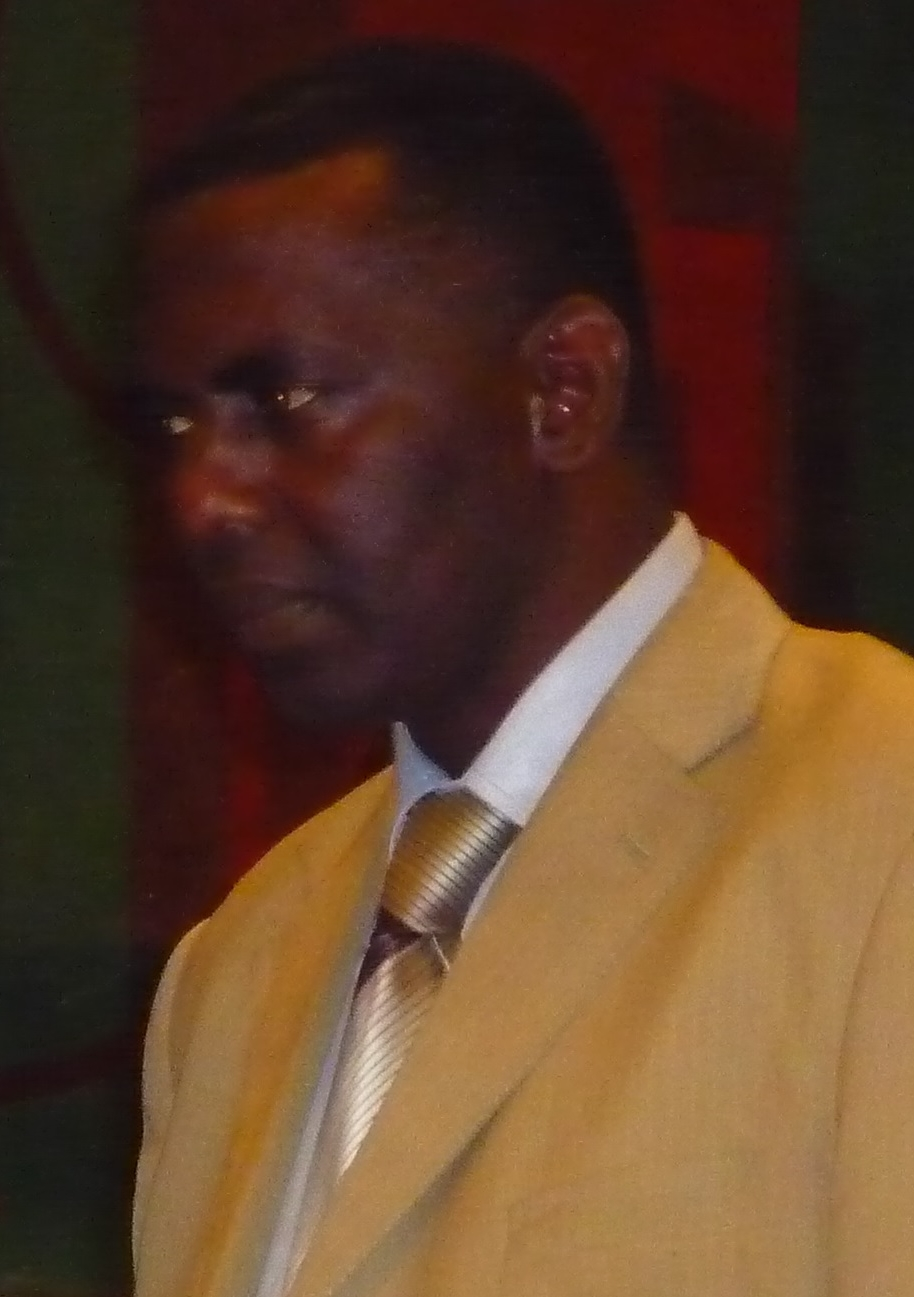
Nominee	Mohamed Ould Abdel Aziz	Biram Dah Abeid
Party	UPR	RAG
Popular vote	577,995	61,218
Percentage	81.89%	8.67%
- Results by wilaya
President before election
Abdel Aziz
UPR
Elected President
Abdel Aziz
UPR

Presidential elections were held in Mauritania on 21 June 2014, with a second round planned for 5 July if no candidate received more than 50% of the vote. The result was a first round victory for incumbent President Mohamed Ould Abdel Aziz of the Union for the Republic, who received 82% of the vote. Most of the opposition parties boycotted the election.

== Background ==
Mohamed Ould Abdel Aziz was the incumbent President of Mauritania at the time of the election and had been in office since 2009. A career soldier and high-ranking officer, he was a leading figure in the August 2005 coup that deposed President Maaouya Ould Sid'Ahmed Taya, and in August 2008 he led another coup, which toppled President Sidi Ould Cheikh Abdallahi. Following the 2008 coup, Abdel Aziz became President of the High Council of State as part of what was described as a political transition leading to a new election. He resigned from that post in April 2009 in order to stand as a candidate in the July 2009 presidential election, which he won. He stood as a candidate again in the 2014 election.

== Conduct ==
Although boycotted by opposition groups, the African Union praised the elections for taking place relatively peacefully. Turnout was estimated at 56%.

== Results ==
Candidate	Party	Votes	%
Mohamed Ould Abdel Aziz	Union for the Republic	577,995	81.89
Biram Dah Abeid	Radical Party for a Global Action	61,218	8.67
Boïdiel Ould Houmeit	El Wiam	31,773	4.50
Ibrahima Moctar Sarr	Alliance for Justice and Democracy/Movement for Renewal	31,368	4.44
Lalla Mariam Bint Moulaye Idriss	Independent	3,434	0.49
Total		705,788	100.00
Valid votes		705,788	94.12
Invalid/blank votes		44,077	5.88
Total votes		749,865	100.00
Registered voters/turnout		1,328,168	56.46
Source: CENI, IDEA
