= Democratic Justice Party (Mauritania) =

Political party in Mauritania

The Democratic Justice Party (French: Parti de la Justice Démocratique, PJD) is a political party in Mauritania.

== History ==
The party won two seats in the 2013 parliamentary elections.
