= Oualata (department) =

- Department
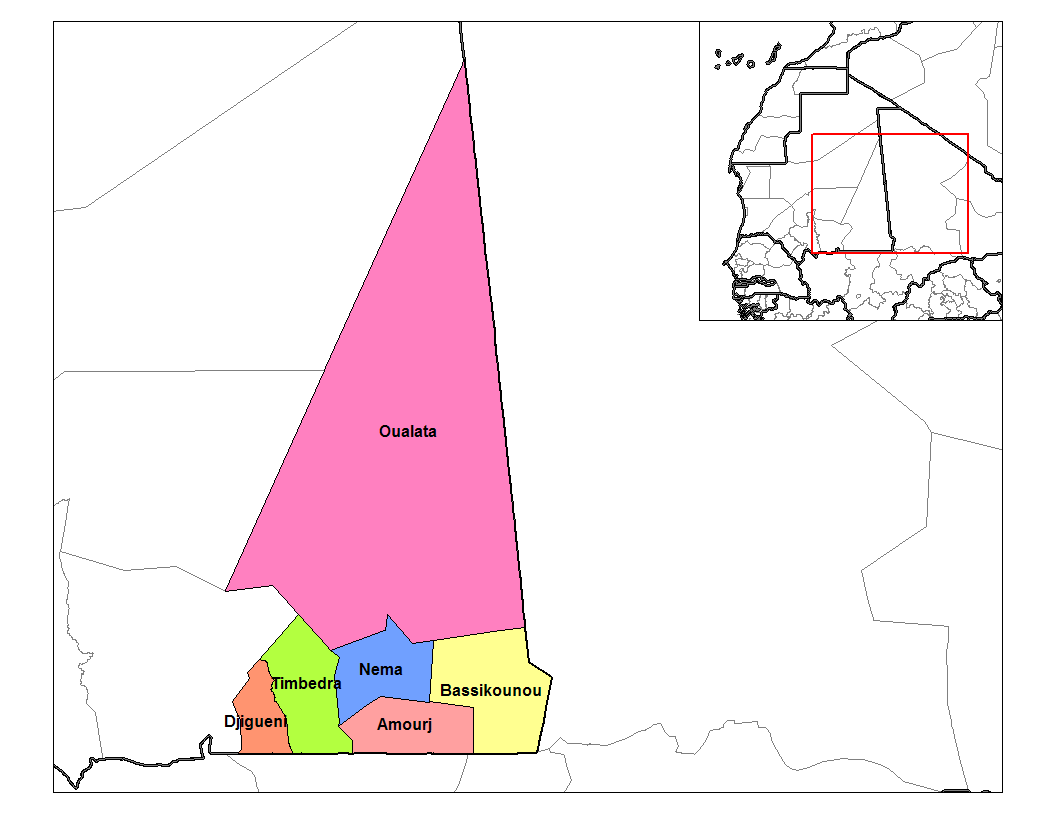

- Location within Mauritania
- Country: Mauritania

Area
  - Total: 137,165 km^{2} (52,960 sq mi)

Population (2013 census)
  - Total: 13,086
  - Density: 0.095403/km^{2} (0.24709/sq mi)

Oualata is a department of Hodh Ech Chargui Region in Mauritania.
