= Socialist Democratic Unionist Party =

Socialist Democratic Unionist Party الحزب الوحدوي الاشتراكي الديمقراطي Parti unioniste démocratique et socialiste
- Secretary General: Mahfoudh Ould El Azizi
- Founded: 20 September 1994; 31 years ago
- Ideology: Neo-Ba'athism
- National affiliation: National Front of Mauritania
- International affiliation: Ba'ath Party (Syrian-dominated faction)
- Colors: Black, Red, Green
- Slogan: "Unity, Democracy, Socialism"
- National Assembly: 0 / 176

Party flag

The Socialist Democratic Unionist Party (French: Parti unioniste démocratique et socialiste, PUDS) was an Arab nationalist political party in Mauritania. As of 2013, the party was led by Mahfouz Weld al-Azizi.

== History ==
The party was founded on 20 September 1994 by a mixture of Arab nationalists and members of a secret Ba'ath party association in Mauritania. The party's name was inspired by the slogan of the Ba'ath party: "Unity, Liberty, Socialism," because Mauritanian electoral law prevents a party's from sharing the name of non-Mauritanian parties. The party's first conference, held in Nouakchott on 11 July 2010, was attended by Abdullah al-Ahmar, the Assistant Secretary General of the National Command of the Arab Socialist Ba'ath Party.

The party won a seat in the 19 November and 3 December 2006 elections. In the most recent elections in 2018, the party received only 0.31% of the vote.

== Ideology ==
The party has strongly supported the Syrian government throughout the Syrian Civil War, and was a member of the National Front of Mauritania, an association of other Mauritanian parties supportive of the Syrian government. The other parties in the Front include the Socialist Party, the Popular Front movement, the Welfare Party, the Social Democratic Party, and the Reform Party.

The party slogan is "Unity, Democracy, Socialism."
