= 2018 Mauritanian parliamentary election =

← 2013	1 September 2018 (first round); 15 September 2018 (second round)	2023 →
- All 157 seats in the National Assembly; 79 seats needed for a majority
- Turnout: 72.46% (▼1.44pp)
Party	Leader	Vote %	Seats	+/–
UPR	M. Mahmoud O. M. Lemine	19.47	93	+18
Tewassoul	Mohamed Jemil O. Mansour	11.28	14	−2
UDP	Naha Mint Mouknass	4.34	6	0
El Karama	Cheikhna Ould Hajbou	3.52	6	0
AND	Yacoub Ould Moine	3.15	4	New
UFP	Mohamed Ould Maouloud	2.80	3	New
RFD	Ahmed Ould Daddah	2.74	3	New
Choura	Med. Lemine O. Sidi Maouloud	2.19	3	+3
PUCM	Hamadi O. Khatary O. Hamadi	2.00	4	+4
APP	Messaoud Ould Boulkheir	1.84	3	−4
Sawab–RAG	Biram Dah Abeid	1.75	3	+3
PSJN	Lalla Mint Cheriva	1.60	3	−1
ADIL	Yahya Ould Ahmed El Waghef	1.40	2	New
El Wiam	Boïdel Ould Houmeit	1.31	2	−8
HIWAR	Valle Mint Mini	1.12	1	New
AJD/MR	Ibrahima Moctar Sarr	1.01	1	−3
UDN	Aly Ould Abass	0.80	1	+1
El Islah	Mohamed Ould Talebna	0.76	1	0
AFCD	Outouma Soumaré	0.67	1	New
El Ghad	Sid'Ahmed Ould Hamadi	0.60	1	New
CMP	Brahim Ould Abdellahi	0.52	1	+1
PPPD	Mohamed Ould Tomy	0.48	1	New
This lists parties that won seats. See the complete results below.
Seat map per constituency
Prime Minister before	Prime Minister-designate
Yahya Ould Hademine; Independent (UPR)	Mohamed Salem Ould Béchir; UPR

Parliamentary elections were held in Mauritania in September 2018; the first round took place on 1 September, with a second round held on 15 September. At the national level, elections were held in 157 constituencies, each electing one member to the National Assembly. Elections were also held in 13 regional councils and 219 municipalities.

As a result of the election, Union for Republic (UPR) remained the single largest party at the national level both in terms of popular vote and seats.

== Electoral system ==
The 157 members of the National Assembly are elected by two methods; 113 are elected from single- or multi-member constituencies using either the two-round system or proportional representation; in single-member constituencies candidates require a majority of the vote to be elected in the first round and a plurality in the second round. In two-seat constituencies, voters vote for a party list (which must contain one man and one woman); if no list receives more than 50% of the vote in the first round, a second round is held, with the winning party taking both seats. In constituencies with three or more seats, closed list proportional representation is used, with seats allocated using the largest remainder method. For three-seat constituencies, party lists must include a female candidate in first or second on the list; for larger constituencies a zipper system is used, with alternate male and female candidates.

The other 40 seats are elected from a single nationwide constituency, also using closed list proportional representation, with half elected on separate lists reserved for women. A further four members are elected by the diaspora.

== Preliminary results ==
Party	National PR seats			Women's seats			Constituency seats						Total seats
Party	National PR seats			Women's seats			First round			Second round			Total seats
Party	Votes	%	Seats	Votes	%	Seats	Votes	%	Seats	Votes	%	Seats	Total seats
Union for the Republic	136,809	19.47		135,831	19.60								93
Tewassoul	79,283	11.28		87,473	12.62								14
Union for Democracy and Progress	30,495	4.34		32,625	4.71								6
El Karam	24,761	3.52		24,131	3.48								6
National Democratic Alliance	22,148	3.15		20,257	2.92								4
Union of the Forces of Progress	19,664	2.80		23,275	3.36								3
Rally of Democratic Forces	19,273	2.74		18,335	2.65								3
Shura Party for Development	15,409	2.19		9,941	1.43								3
Unitary Party for the Construction of Mauritania	14,063	2.00		15,802	2.28								4
People's Progressive Alliance	12,899	1.84		13,045	1.88								3
Sawab	12,265	1.75		9,880	1.43								3
Burst of Youth for the Nation	11,273	1.60		12,299	1.77								3
National Pact for Democracy and Development	9,865	1.40		12,228	1.76								2
El Wiam	9,188	1.31		8,499	1.23								2
Party for Conciliation and Prosperity	7,878	1.12		5,210	0.75								1
AJD/MR	7,102	1.01		5,895	0.85								1
Party of Unity and Development	6,890	0.98		3,877	0.56								0
Ravah Party	6,749	0.96		8,562	1.24								0
Mauritanian Party for the Union and Reform	6,521	0.93		4,178	0.60								0
El Vadila	6,265	0.89		5,658	0.82								0
Party of Mauritanian Authenticity	6,256	0.89		7,874	1.14								0
Mauritanian Party for Justice and Democracy	5,994	0.85		3,772	0.54								0
National Democratic Union	5,655	0.80		9,182	1.32								1
El Moustaghbel	5,570	0.79		8,472	1.22								0
Republican Party for Democracy and Renewal	5,533	0.79		8,315	1.20								0
El Islah	5,334	0.76		9,008	1.30								1
Rally for Mauritania	4,855	0.69		3,243	0.47								0
Avant-Garde Party of the Forces of Democratic Reform	4,717	0.67		4,443	0.64								1
Movement for Refoundation	4,709	0.67		4,032	0.58								0
Mauritanian Liberal Democratic Party	4,607	0.66		4,342	0.63								0
National Union for Democracy and Development	4,538	0.65		–	–	–							0
Rally for Freedom and Democracy	4,338	0.62		4,479	0.65								0
Mauritanian Party for Tomorrow	4,196	0.60		5,156	0.74								1
Mauritanian People's Congress	4,063	0.58		2,889	0.42								0
WAVA Mauritanian Party	4,006	0.57		2,915	0.42								0
Social Democrat Union	3,915	0.56		–	–	–							0
Party of Conservatives	3,850	0.55		2,003	0.29								0
Party of the Mauritanian Masses	3,771	0.54		4,907	0.71								0
Current Party of Renewing Thought	3,706	0.53		3,198	0.46								0
Coalition of Mauritainians for the Fatherland	3,675	0.52		–	–	–							1
Dignity and Action Party	3,520	0.50		3,177	0.46								0
Party of Labour and Equality	3,448	0.49		3,058	0.44								0
Democratic Justice Party	3,441	0.49		3,358	0.48								0
Democratic Alliance Party	3,431	0.49		5,237	0.76								0
Party of Peace and Democratic Progress	3,392	0.48		4,515	0.65								1
Mauritanian Party of Renewal	3,384	0.48		4,316	0.62								0
Democratic Renewal	3,370	0.48		3,622	0.52								0
Nida El Watan	3,366	0.48		2,907	0.42								0
Democratic Socialist Party	3,359	0.48		6,015	0.87								0
National Agreement Party	3,270	0.47		–	–	–							0
Direct Democracy Movement	3,230	0.46		4,270	0.62								0
Popular Front	3,201	0.46		3,218	0.46								0
Mauritanian Party for Justice and Development	3,102	0.44		3,608	0.52								0
Mauritanian Congress Party	3,066	0.44		2,184	0.32								0
National Democratic Convergence	3,056	0.43		2,658	0.38								0
New Generation Party	2,942	0.42		3,126	0.45								0
Rally for Unity	2,803	0.40		3,974	0.57								0
Dialogue and Democracy Party	2,715	0.39		2,555	0.37								0
Democratic Khiyar Party	2,677	0.38		3,778	0.55								0
Third Generation Party	2,671	0.38		2,994	0.43								0
National Ribat Party for Rights and Generation Construction	2,610	0.37		1,816	0.26								0
Mauritanian Party for Renewal and Harmony	2,491	0.35		4,039	0.58								0
Justice and Equality Party	2,385	0.34		2,354	0.34								0
Democratic Consultation Party	2,380	0.34		2,826	0.41								0
Union for the Construction of Mauritania	2,340	0.33		1,250	0.18								0
Socialist Democratic Unionist Party	2,198	0.31		2,046	0.30								0
Mauritanian Party for the Defence of the Environment	2,169	0.31		1,344	0.19								0
National Development Party	2,166	0.31		1,698	0.24								0
Movement of Mauritanian Patriots	2,092	0.30		1,991	0.29								0
Parti Ribat Démocratique et Social	2,036	0.29		2,290	0.33								0
New Vision	2,034	0.29		3,103	0.45								0
Democratic People's Party	2,024	0.29		1,639	0.24								0
Party of Generations of the Democratic Future	2,004	0.29		–	–	–							0
Union for Justice and Development	1,943	0.28		–	–	–							0
Democratic Union of Youth	1,926	0.27		1,105	0.16								0
People's Rally Party	1,845	0.26		1,450	0.21								0
Republican Front for Unity and Democracy	1,829	0.26		–	–	–							0
Mauritanian Hope Party	1,824	0.26		2,709	0.39								0
Rally for Democracy and Unity	1,819	0.26		1,710	0.25								0
Parti du Concret, Arc en ciel	1,808	0.26		1,249	0.18								0
Party for Equity and the Defence of Rights	1,664	0.24		–	–	–							0
Parti de la Mauritanie Comptemporaine	1,658	0.24		–	–	–							0
El Inma National Party	1,630	0.23		1,502	0.22								0
People's Democratic Party	1,621	0.23		1,433	0.21								0
Union for Planning and Construction	1,596	0.23		–	–	–							0
Union for Development and Democracy	1,523	0.22		1,352	0.20								0
Union of the Democratic Center	1,487	0.21		1,031	0.15								0
Party of Construction and Progress	1,407	0.20		2,851	0.41								0
Mauritanian Party for Renewal and Democracy	1,269	0.18		818	0.12								0
Party for Freedom, Equality and Justice	1,265	0.18		1,124	0.16								0
Party of Civilisation and Development	1,249	0.18		2,683	0.39								0
Rally for Equality and Justice	1,235	0.18		1,360	0.20								0
Mauritanian People's Movement	1,132	0.16		1,373	0.20								0
Alliance for Democracy in Mauritania	1,122	0.16		1,493	0.22								0
National Construction	1,061	0.15		1,199	0.17								0
Mauritanian Party for Reform and Equality	1,049	0.15		1,363	0.20								0
Mauritanian Union of Social Forces	1,032	0.15		1,099	0.16								0
Blank votes	21,374	3.14	–	23,521	3.39	–			–			–	–
Invalid votes	324,659	–	–	333,298	–	–		–	–		–	–	–
Total	1,027,367	100	20	1,026,371	100	20							157
Registered voters/turnout	1,417,823	72.46	–	1,417,823	72.43	–			–			–	–
Source: CENI, CENI

== Aftermath ==
After the election, 76 parties from both the presidential majority and opposition camps were dissolved for not obtaining more than 1% or not participating twice in two consecutive local elections, based on an election law passed the year before, with only 28 parties remaining in the political arena. Some of the dissolved parties include the first party founded after the establishment of multi-party politics, the Rally of Democracy and Unity, and the Movement of Reformation led by Kane Hamidou Baba.

=== Election of the President of the National Assembly ===
The election of the President of the National Assembly took place on 8 October 2018, a week after its original scheduled date. Cheikh Ahmed Baye was elected president in the first round.

Candidate	Party	Votes obtained
Required majority →		79 out of 157
Cheikh Ahmed Baye	Union for the Republic	118
Assouvi Ould Cheibani	Tewassoul	27
Abstentions		4
Null votes		2
Absentees		6 (Note: Includes the 4 representatives of Mauritanians overseas, who were yet to be elected by the electoral college.)
