= 2013 Mauritanian parliamentary election =

- 23 November 2013 (first round); 21 December 2013 (second round)
- All 146 seats in the National Assembly; 74 seats needed for a majority
- Turnout: 73.90% (▲0.48pp)
Party	Leader	Vote %	Seats	+/–
UPR	M. Mahmoud Ould M. Lemine	21.34	75	New
Tewassoul	Mohamed Jemil Ould Mansour	13.68	16	New
APP	Messaoud Ould Boulkheir	7.48	7	+2
PSJN	Lalla Mint Cheriva	4.30	4	New
El Wiam	Boïdel Ould Houmeit	3.83	10	New
UDP	Naha Mint Mouknass	3.42	6	+3
AJD/MR	Ibrahima Moctar Sarr	2.61	4	New
El Karama	Cheikhna Ould Hajbou	2.54	6	New
El Vadila	Ethmane Ould Eboul Mealy	2.32	3	New
PUD	Mohamed Baro	2.30	3	New
PAM	Med. Mahmoud O. El Gharachi	1.85	1	New
PUDS	Mahfoudh Ould El Azizi	1.60	1	0
El Ravah	Mohamed Ould Vall	1.40	3	New
PRDR	Sidi Med. Ould Mohamed Vall	1.40	3	−4
PJD		1.39	1	New
PDA	El Hadrami Ould Ahmed	1.07	1	New
PPD	Cheikh Ahmed Ould Ebnou	0.66	1	New
El Islah	Sidna Ould Maham	0.66	1	New
This lists parties that won seats. See the complete results below.
Prime Minister before	Prime Minister-designate
Moulaye Ould Mohamed Laghdaf; Independent (UPR)	Moulaye Ould Mohamed Laghdaf; Independent (UPR)

Parliamentary elections were held in Mauritania on 23 November. The opposition has vowed to boycott the election unless the president steps down beforehand. A total of 1,096 candidates have registered to compete for the leadership of 218 local councils across Mauritania, whilst 438 candidates are contesting for the 146 parliamentary seats. Some 1.2 million Mauritanians were eligible to vote in the election. The first round results yielded a landslide victory for the ruling UPR winning 56 seats and their 14 coalition partners winning 34 seats. The Islamist Tewassoul party won 12 seats. The remaining seats were contested in a runoff on 21 December 2013. The UPR won the majority with 75 seats in the Assembly.

== Background ==
The elections were originally set for 1 October 2011, then delayed several times to 16 October 2011, 31 March 2012, May 2012, October 2013 and November/December 2013, due to continuous disputes between the government and opposition parties.

== Electoral system ==
The 146 members of the National Assembly are elected by two methods (with Mauritanians being able to cast three different votes in a parallel voting system); 106 are elected from single- or multi-member electoral districts based on the departments (or moughataas) that the country is subdivided in (with the exception of Nouakchott, with the nine departments of the city being treated as a single 18-seat electoral district) using either the two-round system or proportional representation; in single-member constituencies candidates require a majority of the vote to be elected in the first round and a plurality in the second round. In two-seat constituencies, voters vote for a party list (which must contain one man and one woman); if no list receives more than 50% of the vote in the first round, a second round is held, with the winning party taking both seats. In constituencies with three or more seats, closed list proportional representation is used, with seats allocated using the largest remainder method. For three-seat constituencies, party lists must include a female candidate in first or second on the list; for larger constituencies a zipper system is used, with alternate male and female candidates.

The other 40 seats are elected from a single nationwide constituency, also using closed list proportional representation, with half elected on a newly introduced separate list reserved for women.

== Contesting parties ==
A total of 74 parties took part. Tewassoul was the only member of the 11 party opposition alliance known as the Coordination of the Democratic Opposition (COD) to take part. The COD's boycott had been criticised by the ruling UPR, with Ould Mohamed Lemine saying such action was unjustifiable "in view of the political and electoral reforms accomplished."

The main contestants are seen to be the UPR, Tewassoul, and the People's Progressive Alliance.

== Campaign ==
The two-week campaign period began on Friday 8 November. The beginning of the campaign was greeted with fireworks, car honking, and loud music in the streets, in the capital of Nouakchott.

Mohamed Mahmoud Ould Mohamed Lemine called for Mauritanians to give the Union for the Republic a majority in parliament so that they could support the program of President Mohamed Ould Abdel Aziz. The UPR is also the only party fielding a contestant in every constituency. The UPR has also criticized Tewassoul for its links to the Muslim Brotherhood, and has called for the movement to dissociate itself from Islamists elsewhere.

Tewassoul has described its participation as a struggle against what it deems the dictatorship of President Mohamed Oul Abdel Aziz, and Party President Mohamed Jemil Ould Mansour has called for a huge turnout by Tewassoul supporters.

Thousands of supporters of the COD marched in Nouakchott on 6 November to protest against the election.

== Results ==
President Ould Abdel Aziz's party, the Union for the Republic (UPR), secured a one-seat majority in its first ever election; while the Islamist National Rally for Reform and Development secured 16 seats, becoming the second largest political force in Mauritania and leading the opposition.

Party	National PR seats			Women's seats			Constituency seats						Total seats
Party	National PR seats			Women's seats			First round			Second round			Total seats
Party	Votes	%	Seats	Votes	%	Seats	Votes	%	Seats	Votes	%	Seats	Total seats
Union for the Republic	127,580	21.34	4	138,651	24.74	5	299,605	39.21	44	124,656	55.11	22	75
Tewassoul	81,744	13.68	3	88,014	15.70	3	102,404	13.4	6	31,103	13.75	4	16
People's Progressive Alliance	44,700	7.48	2	53,610	9.57	2	55,874	7.31	3	9,987	4.42	0	7
Burst of Youth for the Nation	25,706	4.3	1	34,850	6.22	1	54,857	7.18	2	12,934	5.72	0	4
El Wiam	22,888	3.83	1	32,142	5.74	1	59,847	7.83	6	11,369	5.03	2	10
Union for Democracy and Progress	20,470	3.42	1	25,539	4.56	1	25,828	3.38	4	8,458	3.74	0	6
APJD/MPR	15,577	2.61	1	18,029	3.22	1	13,068	1.71	2	–	–	–	4
El Karam	15,193	2.54	1	21,649	3.86	1	25,922	3.39	4	5,002	2.21	0	6
El Vadila	13,893	2.32	1	14,026	2.50	1	8,915	1.17	1	–	–	–	3
Party of Unity and Development	13,748	2.30	1	17,311	3.09	1	23,153	3.03	1	14,752	6.52	0	3
Party of Mauritanian Authenticity	11,072	1.85	1	–	–	–	–	–	–	–	–	–	1
Socialist Democratic Unionist Party	9,551	1.60	1	–	–	–	–	–	–	–	–	–	1
Ravah Party	8,378	1.40	1	9,091	1.62	1	4,752	0.62	1	–	–	–	3
Republican Party for Democracy and Renewal	8,367	1.40	1	14,170	2.53	1	5,082	0.67	1	–	–	–	3
Democratic Justice Party	8,286	1.39	0	8,691	1.55	1	–	–	–	–	–	–	1
Sawab	7,180	1.20	0	7,699	1.37	0	6,648	0.87	0	–	–	–	0
Dignity and Action Party	6,385	1.07	0	5,464	0.97	0	3,645	0.48	1	–	–	–	1
National El Inma Party	6,073	1.02	0	4,302	0.77	0	1,964	0.26	0	–	–	–	0
Democratic Renovation	6,002	1.00	0	8,216	1.47	0	5,105	0.67	0	–	–	–	0
People's Rally Party	5,169	0.86	0	–	–	–	846	0.11	0	–	–	–	0
Popular Front	5,123	0.86	0	–	–	–	2,879	0.38	0	–	–	–	0
Democratic Social Union Party	5,108	0.85	0	6,398	1.14	0	–	–	–	–	–	–	0
Partie Congre de Mauritanie	4,860	0.81	0	4,820	0.86	0	1,414	0.19	0	–	–	–	0
Democratic Socialist Party	4,819	0.81	0	–	–	–	62	0.01	0	–	–	–	0
Mauritanian Hope Party	4,766	0.80	0	6,134	1.09	0	1,571	0.21	0	–	–	–	0
PMRC	4,615	0.77	0	4,196	0.75	0	1,261	0.17	0	–	–	–	0
Mauritanian Party for Renewal	4,172	0.70	0	–	–	–	–	–	–	–	–	–	0
RNLDE Party	4,073	0.68	0	–	–	–	–	–	–	–	–	–	0
Democratic Peace and Progress Party	4,059	0.68	0	–	–	–	–	–	–	–	–	–	0
Shura Party for Development	4,000	0.67	0	–	–	–	821	0.11	0	–	–	–	0
Democratic People's Party	3,969	0.66	0	–	–	–	2,072	0.27	1	–	–	–	1
El Islah	3,885	0.66	0	3,853	0.69	0	2,663	0.35	1	–	–	–	1
Rally for Equality Party	3,703	0.62	0	–	–	–	–	–	–	–	–	–	0
People's Democratic Party	3,600	0.60	0	–	–	–	761	0.10	0	–	–	–	0
Mauritanian Liberal Democratic Party	3,459	0.58	0	–	–	–	–	–	–	–	–	–	0
Rally for Unity Party	3,385	0.57	0	2,856	0.51	0	2,629	0.34	0	–	–	–	0
National Agreement Party	3,296	0.55	0	–	–	–	464	0.06	0	–	–	–	0
Parti RibatDémocratique et Social	3,107	0.51	0	7,490	1.34	0	2,805	0.37	0	–	–	–	0
PMC and CPR Coalition	3,057	0.51	0	6,333	1.13	0	–	–	–	–	–	–	0
National Union for Democracy and Development	3,031	0.51	0	–	–	–	447	0.06	0	–	–	–	0
Mauritanian People's Movement Party	2,865	0.48	0	–	–	–	–	–	–	–	–	–	0
Democratic Consultation Party	2,861	0.48	0	4,663	0.83	0	1,832	0.24	0	–	–	–	0
Dialogue and Democracy Party	2,789	0.47	0	–	–	–	–	–	–	–	–	–	0
Equity and Defence of Right Party	2,781	0.47	0	–	–	–	–	–	–	–	–	–	0
Union for the Construction of Mauritania	2,707	0.45	0	4,588	0.82	0	1,104	0.14	0	–	–	–	0
Third Generation Party	2,623	0.44	0	–	–	–	1,381	0.18	0	–	–	–	0
Democratic Union of Youth	2,602	0.44	0	–	–	–	706	0.09	0	–	–	–	0
Civilisation and Development Party	2,490	0.42	0	3,478	0.62	0	1,764	0.23	0	–	–	–	0
Alliance for Democracy in Mauritania	2,479	0.41	0	–	–	–	1,817	0.24	0	–	–	–	0
National Democratic Union	2,307	0.41	0	–	–	–	–	–	–	–	–	–	0
Direct Democracy Union	2,266	0.38	0	–	–	–	1,756	0.23	0	–	–	–	0
Mauritanian Party for Reform and Equality	2,163	0.36	0	–	–	–	662	0.09	0	–	–	–	0
Union of the Democratic Center	2,123	0.36	0	–	–	–	506	0.07	0	–	–	–	0
Party of Labour and Equality	1,943	0.33	0	–	–	–	1,306	0.17	0	–	–	–	0
New Vision Party	1,581	0.26	0	–	–	–	–	–	–	–	–	–	0
Mauritanian Party for Democracy and Prosperity	1,547	0.26	0	–	–	–	191	0.02	0	–	–	–	0
Mauritanian Party for Justice and Democracy	1,345	0.23	0	4,172	0.74	0	614	0.08	0	–	–	–	0
Coalition of Mauritanians for the Fatherland	1,117	0.19	0	–	–	–	–	–	–	–	–	–	0
Mauritanian Party for Justice and Development	–	–	–	–	–	–	1,234	0.16	0	–	–	–	0
Party for a Contemporary Mauritania	–	–	–	–	–	–	1,167	0.15	0	–	–	–	0
Union of Social Forces	–	–	–	–	–	–	1,006	0.13	0	–	–	–	0
Rally of National Youth	–	–	–	–	–	–	925	0.12	0	–	–	–	0
Generation of a Democratic Future Party	–	–	–	–	–	–	681	0.09	0	–	–	–	0
Social Democratic Party	–	–	–	–	–	–	50	0.01	0	–	–	–	0
Wava Mauritanian Party	–	–	–	–	–	–	35	0.00	0	–	–	–	0
Coalitions	–	–	–	–	–	–	28,045	3.67	0	7,943	3.51	0	0
Invalid/blank votes	300,005	–	–	288,476	–	–	130,264	–	–	17,794	–	–	–
Total	878,693	100	20	848,911	100	20	894,410	100	78	243,998	100	28	146
Registered voters/turnout	1,189,105	73.90	–	1,189,105	71.39	–	1,179,384	75.84	–	311,940	78.22	–	–
Source: CENI

== Aftermath ==
Following the first round of voting, on 23 November, Tewassoul president Jemil Ould Mansour claimed at a party news conference that the party had found "serious irregularities" including ballot stuffing and voting being carried out after the count. Mansour claimed these irregularities could discredit the election, and stated that the party had sent a delegation to the electoral commission to complain. He did not say which parties he believed to have benefited from the alleged irregularities.
