= Democratic Renovation =

Political party in Mauritania

Democratic Renovation Rénovation Démocratique
- Chairman: Moustapha Ould Abeiderrahmane
- National affiliation: Patriotic Alliance
- Seats in the National Assembly: 0 / 95
- Seats in the Senate: 0 / 56

The Democratic Renovation (Rénovation Démocratique) is a political party in Mauritania. The party won 2 out of 95 seats in the 19 November and 3 December 2006 elections.
