= Mohamed Mahmoud Ould Mohamed Lemine =

Mauritanian politician (born 1952)

President of the Union for the Republic party
- In office 2 August 2009 – 29 December 2019
- Preceded by: Mohamed Ould Abdel Aziz
- Succeeded by: Sidi Mohamed Ould Taleb Amar

Minister of Defense
- In office 28 April 2007 – 6 August 2008
- President: Sidi Ould Cheikh Abdallahi
- Prime Minister: Zeine Ould Zeidane; Yahya Ould Ahmed El Waghef

Minister of Interior, Posts, and Telecommunications
- In office 30 March 2007 – 28 April 2007
- President: Ely Ould Mohamed Vall
- Prime Minister: Sidi Mohamed Ould Boubacar

Personal details
- Born: 1952 (age 73–74) Hodh El Gharbi Region, Mauritania, French West Africa
- Party: Union for the Republic (UPR)
- Education: University of Cairo
- Occupation: Politician, professor, economist

Mohamed Mahmoud Ould Mohamed Lemine (born in 1952) is a Mauritanian politician.

Born in the Hodh El Gharbi region, Ould Mohamed Lemine graduated from the University of Cairo with a diploma in economics and has worked as a professor at the University of Nouakchott.

He served as Minister of Defense under Prime Minister's Zeine Ould Zeidane and Yahya Ould Ahmed El Waghef until the August 2008 coup which overthrew President Sidi Ould Cheikh Abdallahi and created a new government with Moulaye Ould Mohamed Laghdaf as Prime Minister.

Lemine was the President of the Union for the Republic party from 2009 to 2019.
