= Burst of Youth for the Nation =

Political party in Mauritania

Burst of Youth for the Nation الحراك الشبابي من أجل الوطن Sursaut de la jeunesse pour la nation
- Leader: Lalla Mint Cheriva
- Founded: 2011
- Dissolved: 19 October 2023
- Ideology: Youth politics
- National affiliation: Coordination of Parties of the Majority
- National Assembly: 0 / 176
- Regional councils: 1 / 285
- Mayors: 1 / 238

Election symbol

Burst of Youth for the Nation (Arabic: حزب الحراك الشبابي من أجل الوطن; French: Parti du sursaut de la jeunesse pour la nation, PSJN or Sursaut) was a minor political party in Mauritania.

== History ==
The party was founded in 2011 by a group of youth activists inspired by the Arab Spring seeking to involve young Mauritanians into active politics. It won four seats in the 2013 parliamentary elections.

The party was reduced to three seats in the 2018 elections. Following the elections the party split. A faction of the party led by Varha Mint Ahmed Ely removed leader Lalla Mint Cheriva and elected Mint Ahmed Ely instead on 21 October 2018, a move condemned by the Lalla-led faction. In December 2018 the Lalla faction released a statement confirming that Varha's faction had only four members and that the move was illegal and not to be recognised.

In 2019 it was rumoured that ex-President Mohamed Ould Abdel Aziz would join the party to become its leader, although this did not happen.

The party failed to win a seat in the May 2023 parliamentary elections and was legally deregistered on 19 October 2023 together with four other parties after failing to obtain 1% in two consecutive local elections.
