= 2006 Mauritanian parliamentary election =

- 19 November 2006 (first round); 3 December 2006 (second round)
- All 95 seats in the National Assembly; 48 seats needed for a majority
- Turnout: 73.42% (▲18.97pp)
Party	Leader	Seats	+/–
RFD	Ahmed Ould Daddah	16	+13
UFP	Mohamed Ould Maouloud	9	+6
PRDR	Sidi Mohamed Ould Mohamed Vall	7	−57
APP	Messaoud Ould Boulkheir	6	+2
RDU	Ahmed Ould Sidi Baba	3	0
UDP	Naha Mint Mouknass	3	0
HATEM	Saleh Ould Hanenna	3	New
RD	Moustapha Ould Abeiderrahmane	2	New
Alternative	Med. Yehdih O. El Moctar El Hassen	1	New
RNLDE	Sidi Med. Haidra O. Ahmed Salem	1	New
FP	Med. Lemine Ch'bih O. C. Melainine	1	0
PUDS	Mahfoudh Ould El Azizi	1	+1
UCD	Cheikh Sid'Ahmed Ould Baba	1	New
Independents	–	41	+41
This lists parties that won seats. See the complete results below.
Prime Minister before	Prime Minister-designate
Sidi Mohamed Ould Boubacar; PRDS	Sidi Mohamed Ould Boubacar; Independent

Parliamentary elections were held in Mauritania on 19 November 2006, with a second round on 3 December. At least 28 political parties competed for seats in the National Assembly, the lower house of Parliament. Islamist parties were banned, but many Islamists ran as independent candidates. 95 seats in the National Assembly were at stake in the election, along with over 200 local councils.

About 600 independent candidates ran in the election, many of whom were grouped into the National Rally of Independents (RNI). Many members of the RNI were formerly members of the Democratic and Social Republican Party (PRDS), which had ruled the country under President Maaouya Ould Sid'Ahmed Taya.

== Results ==
Before the first round's count was complete, Ahmed Ould Daddah claimed victory for his party, the Rally of Democratic Forces (RFD), saying that it was "the country's biggest political force", and claiming that the eight-party coalition including the RFD had won a majority. The People's Progressive Alliance (APP), a party for former slaves that is also part of the coalition, and the renamed former ruling party, the Republican Party for Democracy and Renewal, were also reported to have performed well.

Results from the first round confirmed a strong showing for the RFD, which won 12 out of the 43 declared seats; independent candidates also did well, taking 24 seats. For 52 seats, however, candidates did not receive majorities and these seats had to be decided in the second round. After the second round was held on 3 December, the coalition of former opposition parties had 39 seats (including 15 for the RFD), with an additional two seats for independents supporting the coalition. Independents won 41 seats, 39 of which were part of the RNI. The former ruling party won seven seats.

17.89% of the deputies elected were female.

Messaoud Ould Boulkheir of the APP was elected as President of the National Assembly on April 26, 2007. There were 93 deputies present for the vote, and 91 of them voted for Ould Boulkheir; two other deputies, Babah Ould Ahmed Babou and El Arbi Ould Jideyne, each received one vote.

Party	First round			Second round			Total seats
Party	Votes	%	Seats	Votes	%	Seats	Total seats
Rally of Democratic Forces			12			3	15
Union of the Forces of Progress			3			5	8
Republican Party for Democracy and Renewal			4			3	7
People's Progressive Alliance			4			1	5
Rally for Democracy and Unity			2			1	3
Union for Democracy and Progress			1			2	3
APP–HATEM			0			2	2
Democratic Renovation			2			0	2
Mauritanian Party of Union and Change			2			0	2
RFP–UFP			0			2	2
Alternative			0			1	1
National Rally for Democracy, Liberty and Equality			1			0	1
Popular Front			1			0	1
Socialist Democratic Unionist Party			1			0	1
Union of the Democratic Centre			0			1	1
Independents			10			31	41
Total			43			52	95
Valid votes	665,313	84.43		412,546	93.80		
Invalid/blank votes	122,716	15.57		27,289	6.20		
Total votes	788,029	100.00		439,835	100.00		
Registered voters/turnout	1,073,287	73.42		632,956	69.49		
Source: IPU
