= Union of the Democratic Centre (Mauritania) =

Political party in Mauritania

Union of the Democratic Centre اتحاد الوسط الديمقراطي Union du centre démocratique
- Abbreviation: UDC
- Dissolved: 2018
- Ideology: Centrism; Zionism (alleged)
- Political position: Centre

The Union of the Democratic Centre (Arabic: اتحاد الوسط الديمقراطي; French: Union du centre démocratique, UCD) was a political party in Mauritania.

== History ==
The party was founded by former members of the government of Maaouiya Ould Sid'Ahmed Taya after failed attempts to merge with the Mauritanian Party of Union and Change.

The party was commonly mockingly referred to as Kadima (after the then ruling Israeli party) by its detractors due to the leaders of the party traditionally lobbying for and supporting the establishment of diplomatic relations with the State of Israel, which led to the party being extremely unpopular among Mauritanians. The name was heavily rejected by the leadership.

== Ideology ==
The Union of the Democratic Centre sought to represent the political centre by adopting an intermediate position between the formerly ruling Democratic and Social Republican Party and the opposition.
