= 2019 Mauritanian presidential election =

- 22 June 2019
- Registered: 1,544,132 (▲16.26%)
- Turnout: 62.63% (▲6.17pp)
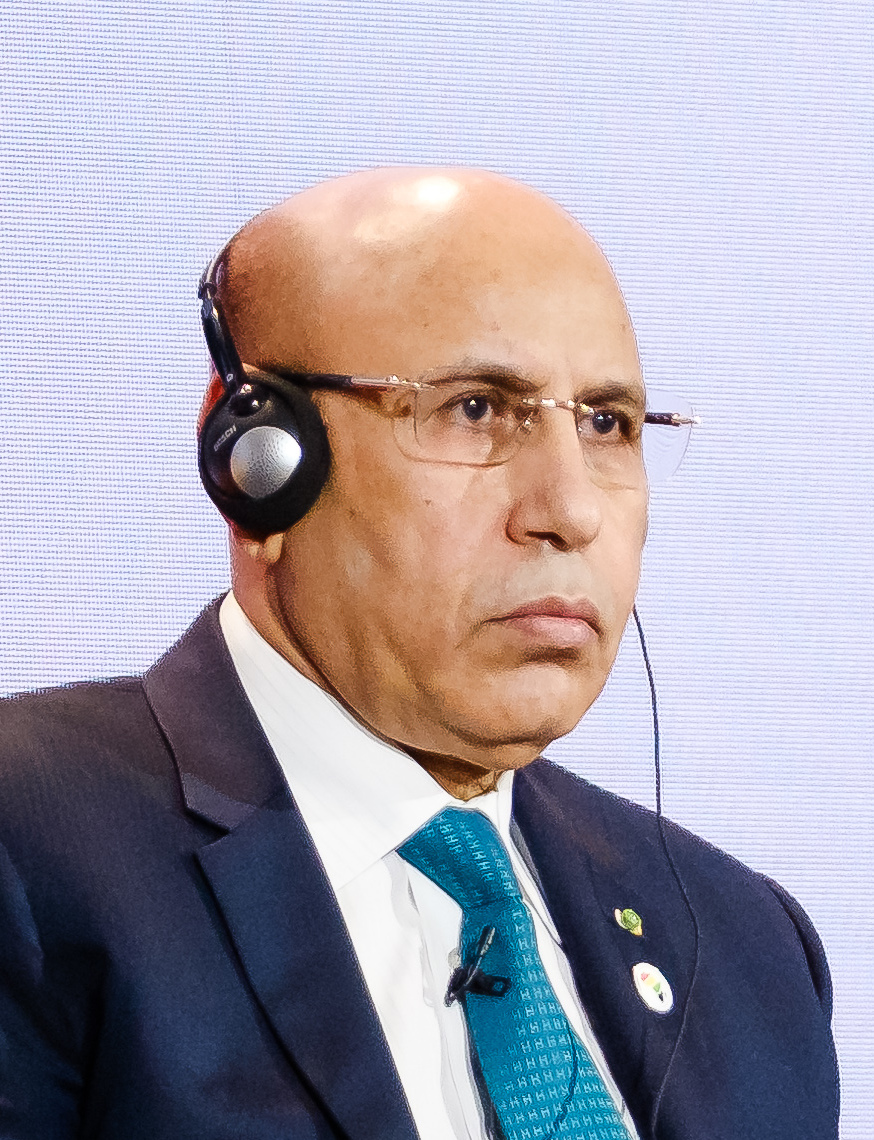

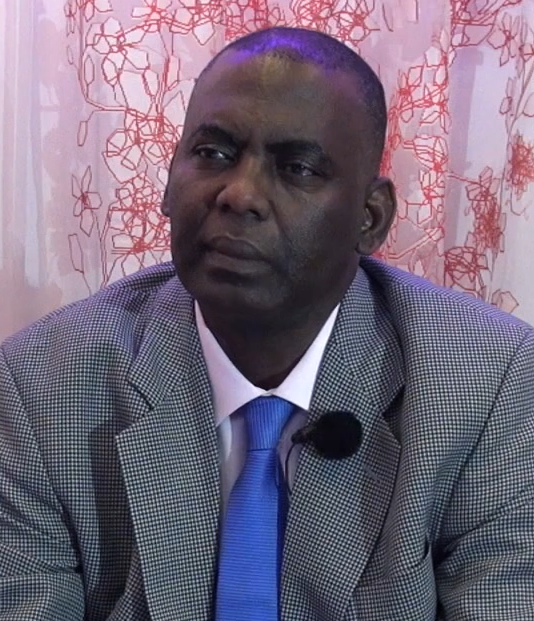

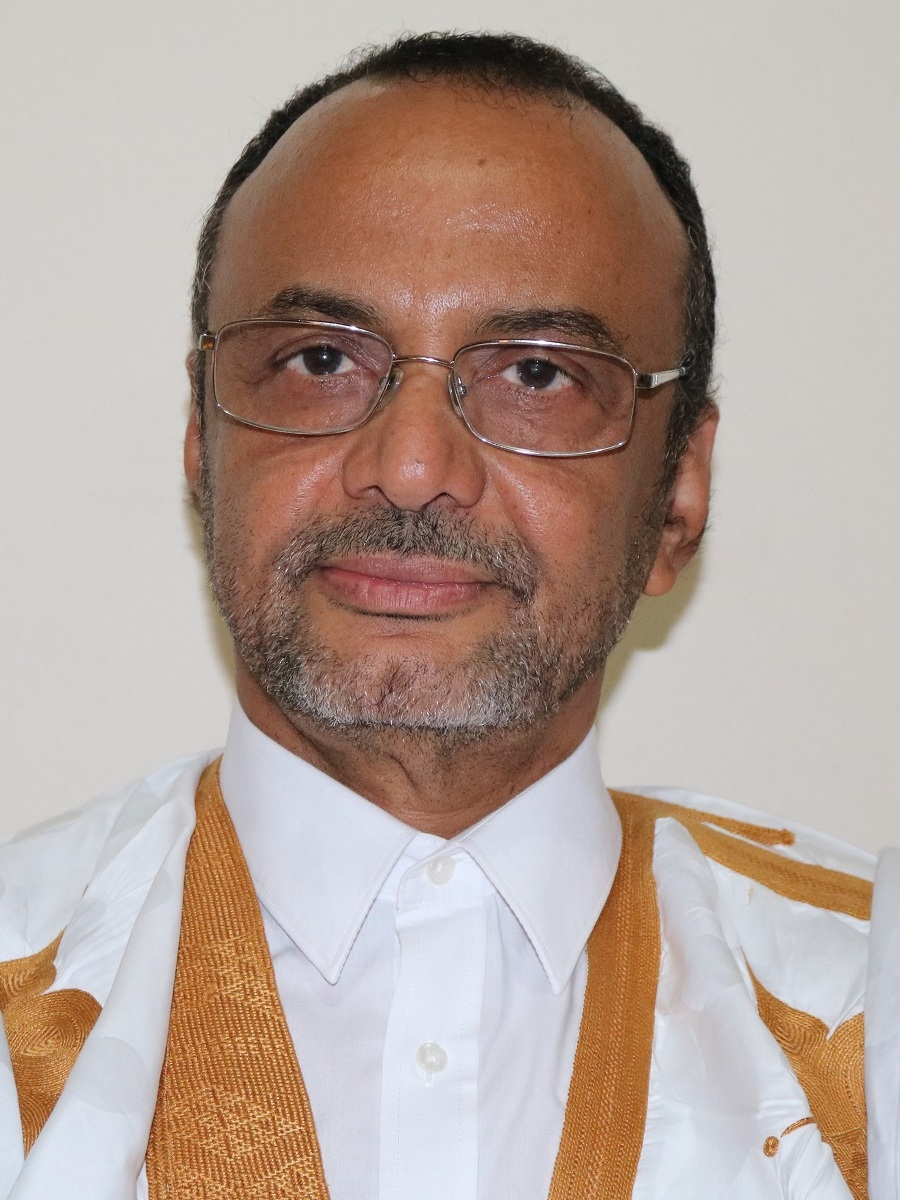

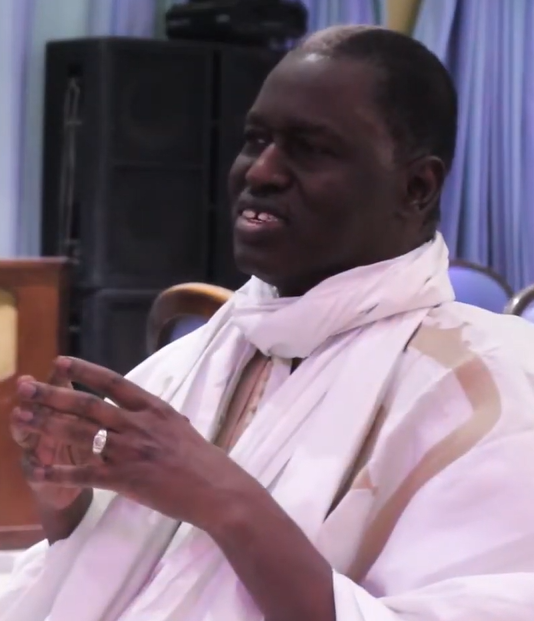
Candidate	Mohamed Ould Ghazouani	Biram Dah Abeid
Party	UPR	RAG
Alliance	CPM	Sawab–RAG
Popular vote	483,007	172,649
Percentage	52.00%	18.59%
Candidate	Sidi Mohamed Ould Boubacar	Kane Hamidou Baba
Party	Independent	MPR
Alliance	Tewassoul–HATEM+	CVE
Popular vote	165,995	80,777
Percentage	17.87%	8.70%
- Results by wilaya and moughataa
President before election
Mohamed Ould Abdel Aziz
UPR
President-elect
Mohamed Ould Ghazouani
UPR

Presidential elections were held in Mauritania on 22 June 2019, with a second round planned for 6 July if no candidate had received more than 50% of the vote. The result was a first round victory for Mohamed Ould Ghazouani who won with 52 percent of the vote. However, opposition rejected the results, calling it "another army coup." On 1 July 2019, Mauritania's constitutional council confirmed Ghazouani as president and rejected a challenge by the opposition.

With incumbent President Mohamed Ould Abdel Aziz not running, the elections were reported to be the first peaceful transfer of power since the country's independence from France in 1960.

== Electoral system ==
Under Article 26 of the constitution, the president is elected for a five-year term using the two round system. If no candidate receives an absolute majority of the vote in the first round, a second round is held two weeks later between the two candidates who received the most votes.

Candidacy is restricted to citizens by birth aged between 40 and 75 (on the day of the first round) who have not had their civil and political rights removed. Article 23 also stipulates that the president has to be a Muslim. Article 28 establishes a term limit of two mandates, allowing the president to only be re-elected once.

The election of a new president is required to take place between 30 and 45 days before the expiration of the term of the incumbent president.

== Candidates ==
- Mohamed Ould Ghazouani, Union for the Republic.
- Sidi Mohamed Ould Boubacar, supported by Tewassoul.
- Biram Dah Abeid, Independent.
- Mohamed Ould Maouloud, Union of the Forces of Progress, supported by the Rally of Democratic Forces.
- Kane Hamidou Baba, Independent, supported by the Vivre Ensemble coalition.
- Mohamed Lemine El Mourteji El Wafi, Independent.

== Campaign ==
=== Candidate slogans ===
Candidate	Original slogan		English translation	Ref.
Candidate	In Arabic	In French	English translation	Ref.
Mohamed Ould Ghazouani	من أجل الوطن	Pour la patrie	For the homeland	
Biram Dah Abeid	التغيير الآن	Le changement, c'est maintenant	Change now	
Sidi Mohamed Ould Boubacar	استعادة الأمل التغيير الآن وليس غدا!	Ressuciter l'espoir Le Changement, c'est maintenant et non demain !	Restore hope Change now, not tomorrow!	

== Opinion polls ==
Polling firm	Fieldwork date	Sample size							Blank	Undecided	Refused to answer
Polling firm	Fieldwork date	Sample size	Ghazouani UPR	Boubacar Ind.	Dah Abeid Sawab–RAG	Maouloud UFP	Baba CVE	El Wafi Ind.	Blank	Undecided	Refused to answer
CMERS	15 Jun 2019	2,056	29.5%	23.0%	9.5%	3.7%	2.6%	2.1%	2.0%	14.9%	12.7%

== Results ==
Candidate	Party	Votes	%
Mohamed Ould Ghazouani	Union for the Republic	483,007	52.00
Biram Dah Abeid	Democratic Alternation Pole	172,649	18.59
Sidi Mohamed Ould Boubacar	Independent	165,995	17.87
Kane Hamidou Baba	Coalition Living Together	80,777	8.70
Mohamed Ould Maouloud	Union of the Forces of Progress	22,656	2.44
Mohamed Lemine El Mourteji El Wafi	Independent	3,688	0.40
Total		928,772	100.00
Valid votes		928,772	96.04
Invalid votes		28,796	2.98
Blank votes		9,504	0.98
Total votes		967,072	100.00
Registered voters/turnout		1,544,132	62.63
Source: Constitutional Council

=== Tables ===
Results by wilaya
Wilaya	Ghazouani		Abeid		Boubacar		Baba		Maouloud		El Wavi		Neutral		Null	
Wilaya	Votes	%	Votes	%	Votes	%	Votes	%	Votes	%	Votes	%	Votes	%	Votes	%
Adrar	16,743	68.88%	1,514	6.23%	5,009	20.61%	226	0.93%	751	3.09%	63	0.26%	178	0.71%	668	2.66%
Assaba	47,275	68.19%	10,702	15.44%	8,805	12.70%	921	1.33%	1,418	2.05%	203	0.29%	305	0.42%	2,496	3.46%
Brakna	46,038	50.64%	10,643	11.71%	15,947	17.54%	16,836	18.52%	1,291	1.42%	160	0.18%	1,350	1.42%	2,753	2.90%
Dakhlet Nouadhibou	14,248	30.04%	15,587	32.86%	10,713	22.59%	5,534	11.67%	1,075	2.27%	273	0.58%	491	1.00%	1,010	2.06%
Gorgol	23,594	35.95%	21,429	32.65%	3,451	5.26%	15,196	23.16%	1,795	2.74%	158	0.24%	937	1.36%	2,435	3.53%
Guidimagha	19,454	41.69%	16,131	34.56%	4,021	8.62%	6,461	13.84%	529	1.13%	73	0.16%	573	1.16%	1,958	3.98%
Hodh Ech Chargui	75,463	81.80%	2,877	3.12%	12,156	13.18%	367	0.40%	594	0.64%	799	0.87%	336	0.35%	2,809	2.94%
Hodh El Gharbi	52,350	75.07%	3,421	4.91%	11,647	16.70%	625	0.90%	1,430	2.05%	266	0.38%	243	0.34%	1,849	2.57%
Inchiri	5,659	60.67%	753	8.07%	2,244	24.06%	472	5.06%	180	1.93%	19	0.20%	94	0.98%	193	2.01%
Nouakchott-Nord	29,055	39.77%	15,003	20.54%	22,558	30.88%	2,776	3.80%	3,133	4.29%	534	0.73%	824	1.08%	2,368	3.11%
Nouakchott-Ouest	25,379	34.89%	20,055	27.57%	13,468	18.51%	10,124	13.92%	3,414	4.69%	306	0.42%	1,164	1.53%	2,386	2,386
Nouakchott-Sud	30,889	31.39%	30,621	31.12%	18,742	19.05%	15,054	15.30%	2,667	2.71%	433	0.44%	1,472	1.43%	3,203	3.11%
Tagant	19,467	73.47%	1,105	4.17%	4,622	17.44%	73	0.28%	1,186	4.48%	44	0.17%	152	0.56%	549	2.02%
Tiris Zemmour	8,772	44.07%	2,991	15.03%	5,690	28.59%	1,834	9.21%	539	2.71%	77	0.39%	174	0.84%	556	2.69%
Trarza	65,068	57.77%	17,150	15.23%	25,021	22.22%	2,808	2.49%	2,369	2.10%	211	0.19%	1,119	0.96%	3,352	2.86%
Diaspora	3,553	35.73%	2,667	26.82%	1,901	19.12%	1,470	14.78%	285	2.87%	69	0.69%	92	0.90%	211	2.06%
Total	483,007	52.00%	172,649	18.59%	165,995	17.87%	80,777	8.70%	22,656	2.44%	3,688	0.40%	9,504	0.98%	28,796	2.98%
Source: Constitutional Council

Results by moughataa
Moughataa	Ghazouani		Abeid		Boubacar		Baba		Maouloud		El Wavi		Neutral		Null	
Moughataa	Votes	%	Votes	%	Votes	%	Votes	%	Votes	%	Votes	%	Votes	%	Votes	%
Aïoun	12,673	71.01%	897	5.03%	3,779	21.17%	40	0.22%	379	2.12%	80	0.45%	52	0.28%	451	2.46%
Akjoujt	3,422	59.27%	300	5.20%	1,622	28.09%	288	4.99%	128	2.22%	14	0.24%	64	1.08%	95	1.60%
Aleg	20,143	64.45%	2,324	7.44%	8,027	25.68%	286	0.92%	427	1.37%	49	0.16%	137	0.42%	935	2.89%
Amourj																
Aoujeft	4,413	77.75%	81	1.43%	797	14.04%	19	0.33%	355	6.25%	11	0.19%	24	0.42%	73	1.26%
Arafat	19,730	44.28%	7,486	16.80%	12,439	27.92%	2,859	6.42%	1,725	3.87%	318	0.71%	508	1.10%	1,289	2.78%
Atar	9,333	63.89%	1,237	8.47%	3,629	24.84%	190	1.30%	181	1.24%	38	0.26%	138	0.90%	516	3.38%
Bababé	3,487	36.52%	1,121	11.74%	483	5.06%	4,378	45.85%	63	0.66%	16	0.17%	328	3.24%	263	2.59%
Barkéol																
Bassiknou																
Bénichab	2,237	62.96%	453	12.75%	622	17.51%	184	5.18%	52	1.46%	5	0.14%	30	0.82%	98	2.66%
Bir Moghrein																
Boghé	5,820	30.29%	3,834	19.96%	1,738	9.05%	7,433	38.69%	346	1.80%	41	0.21%	482	2.38%	551	2.72%
Boumdeid																
Boutilimit																
Chami	1,818	54.40%	441	13.20%	977	29.23%	38	1.14%	55	1.65%	13	0.39%	53	1.52%	84	2.41%
Chinguetti	1,611	67.13%	167	6.96%	386	16.08%	16	0.67%	207	8.63%	13	0.54%	9	0.36%	63	2.55%
Dar Naïm	8,927	37.59%	6,327	26.64%	6,145	25.87%	1,455	6.13%	835	3.52%	61	0.26%	303	1.21%	900	3.61%
Djiguenni																
El Mina	5,985	20.37%	13,193	44.90%	3,142	10.69%	6,619	22.52%	391	1.33%	56	0.19%	543	1.75%	1,047	3.38%
F'Déirick																
Ghabou																
Guerou																
Kaédi																
Kankoussa																
Keur Macène																
Kiffa																
Koubenni	12,456	67.02%	1,470	7.91%	3,646	19.62%	300	1.61%	630	3.39%	84	0.45%	84	0.44%	614	3.18%
Ksar	9,623	46.13%	3,862	18.51%	5,395	25.86%	923	4.42%	971	4.65%	87	0.42%	304	1.39%	747	3.41%
M'Bagne																
M'Bout																
Maghama																
Magta Lahjar																
Méderdra																
Monguel																
Moudjéria																
N'Beiket Lahwach																
Néma																
Nouadhibou	12,430	28.19%	15,146	34.35%	9,736	22.08%	5,496	12.47%	1,020	2.31%	260	0.59%	438	0.96%	926	2.04%
Ouad Naga																
Ouadane	1,386	85.45%	29	1.79%	197	12.15%	1	0.06%	8	0.49%	1	0.06%	7	0.43%	16	0.97%
Oualata																
Ould Yengé																
R'Kiz																
Riyad	5,174	21.15%	9,942	40.64%	3,161	12.92%	5,576	22.79%	551	2.25%	59	0.24%	421	1.63%	867	3.37%
Rosso																
Sebkha	2,720	13.04%	9,795	46.97%	983	4.71%	7,018	33.65%	304	1.46%	35	0.17%	386	1.75%	780	3.54%
Sélibaby																
Tamchekett	9,449	83.90%	399	3.54%	1,297	11.52%	25	0.22%	74	0.66%	18	0.16%	23	0.20%	188	1.64%
Tevragh Zeina	13,036	42.01%	6,398	20.62%	7,090	22.85%	2,183	7.04%	2,139	6.89%	184	0.59%	474	1.46%	859	2.65%
Teyarett	8,493	40.08%	3,808	17.97%	6,659	31.43%	985	4.65%	1,099	5.19%	144	0.68%	266	1.21%	596	2.70%
Tichitt																
Tidjikja																
Timbédra																
Tintane	17,772	80.62%	655	2.97%	2,925	13.27%	260	1.18%	347	1.57%	84	0.38%	84	0.37%	596	2.62%
Toujounine	11,635	41.37%	4,868	17.31%	9,754	34.69%	336	1.19%	1,199	4.26%	329	1.17%	255	0.87%	872	2.98%
Zouérate																
Africa																
America																
Asia																
Europe																
Total	483,007	52.00%	172,649	18.59%	165,995	17.87%	80,777	8.70%	22,656	2.44%	3,688	0.40%	9,504	0.98%	28,796	2.98%
Source: Constitutional Council

== Aftermath ==
Following Ould Ghazouani's declaration of victory, protests were held in Nouakchott, leading to around 100 arrests. The government started to reduce mobile internet services on the day after the elections, with fixed-line internet services ceasing on 25 June; both were fully restored on 3 July.
