= 2023 Mauritanian parliamentary election =

- 13 May 2023 (first round); 27 May 2023 (second round)
- All 176 seats in the National Assembly; 89 seats needed for a majority
- Turnout: 71.59% (▼0.87pp)
Party	Leader	Vote %	Seats	+/–
El Insaf	Mohamed Ould Meguett (Note: Mohamed Melainine Ould Eyih was the party leader, but Ould Meguett led the national list and was ultimately elected President of the National Assembly.)	35.25	107	+14
Tewassoul	Hamadi Ould Sid'El Moctar	10.24	11	−3
UDP	Naha Mint Mouknass	6.06	10	+4
Sawab–RAG	Biram Dah Abeid	4.10	5	+2
Hope MR	Collective leadership	3.33	7	+7
AND	Yacoub Ould Moine	3.30	6	+2
El Islah	Mohamed Ould Talebna	3.28	6	+5
HATEM	Saleh Ould Hanenna	2.90	3	+3
El Karama	Cheikhna Ould Hajbou	2.62	5	−1
NW	Daoud Ould Ahmed Aicha	2.50	5	+5
AJD/MR+	Ibrahima Moctar Sarr	2.18	4	+3
HIWAR	Valle Mint Mini	2.08	3	+2
PMM	El Khalil Ould Ennahoui	2.08	1	+1
El Vadila	Ethmane Ould Eboul Mealy	1.78	2	+2
CED	Collective leadership	1.55	1	+1
This lists parties that won seats. See the complete results below.

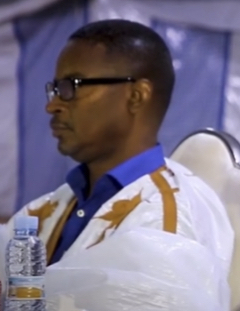

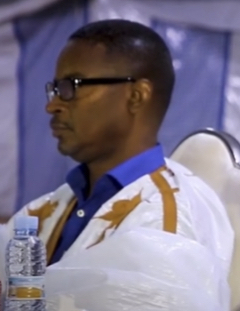
Prime Minister before	Prime Minister-designate
Mohamed Ould Bilal; El Insaf	Mohamed Ould Bilal; El Insaf

Parliamentary elections were held in Mauritania on 13 and 27 May 2023, alongside regional and local elections.

The elections were the first parliamentary elections held after the first peaceful transition of power in the country as a result of the 2019 presidential elections, in which Mohamed Ould Ghazouani was elected president after incumbent Mohamed Ould Abdel Aziz was not able to run due to the two-term constitutional limit.

Ruling El Insaf (Equity Party) managed to secure a majority in the National Assembly and increase its national list vote percentage, in part due to the smaller number of parties contesting this election. The party was forced into several runoffs and didn't sweep into all constituencies elected through a general ticket as in 2018. The opposition was completely restructured, with left-wing Union of the Forces of Progress, centre-left Rally of Democratic Forces and Haratine minority interests People's Progressive Alliance losing all of their seats in the National Assembly, with left-leaning Hope Mauritania replacing them as the hegemonic left-wing opposition.

== Background ==
The previous parliamentary elections in 2018 saw the incumbent Union for the Republic (UPR) re-elected with an absolute majority, forming a coalition government with the Union for Democracy and Progress (UDP) with support of parties from the presidential majority, giving the UPR a comfortable majority in the National Assembly.

After the elections, 76 parties from both the presidential majority and opposition camps were dissolved for not obtaining more than 1% or not participating in two consecutive local elections, based on an election law passed the year before, with only 28 parties left registered.

Mohamed Ould Ghazouani from the UPR was elected president in the 2019 presidential elections, leading to the first peaceful transition of power in the country. Ghazouani quickly distanced himself from outgoing president Mohamed Ould Abdel Aziz, a divide that was made effective when Sidi Mohamed Ould Taleb Omar was elected president of the UPR, with Ould Abdel Aziz leaving the party. Ould Abdel Aziz was subsequently charged with "corruption, money laundering, illicit enrichment and abuse of influence" by the Public Prosecutor in March 2021 and referred to court in June 2022. He had been jailed in June 2021, until a bail was granted in January 2022 over health concerns.

After the split between Ghazouani and Aziz, the parties of the presidential majority reaffirmed their support to Ghazouani when creating the Coordination of Parties of the Majority in April 2021, as the new alliance gathering the parties of the presidential majority heavily criticised the legacy of the former president.

Four major political parties merged into the Union for the Republic. On 18 October 2018, a month after the previous parliamentary elections, the Unionist Party for the Construction of Mauritania (PUCM) voted to merge into the UPR. On 21 October Choura for Development made the same decision, while centrist El Wiam, a moderate opposition party, did the same on 29 October. The last party to merge into the UPR was the National Pact for Democracy and Development (PNDD-ADIL), which was the ruling party from 2007 until the 2008 coup. PNDD-ADIL merged into the UPR on 27 December 2019.

During the legislative term there were several cabinet reshuffles, the first one due to ministers appearing in papers from a parliamentary commission investigating corruption during the Aziz era, leading to the fall of Ismail Ould Bedde Ould Cheikh Sidiya's government in August 2020 and Mohamed Ould Bilal becoming the new PM. The second one was in May 2021 to restructure several ministries. The third one was in March–April 2022 after the resignation of Prime Minister Mohamed Ould Bilal, who was re-appointed the following day with a new cabinet. The fourth and fifth ones were in September 2022, the first due to the government wanting to fit in former PM Moulaye Ould Mohamed Laghdaf since he was seen as more capable of negotiating with the opposition and helping the government win the next elections, with the second one happening two weeks later.

On 26 September 2022 an agreement between the Ministry of the Interior and Decentralisation and all political parties registered in Mauritania was reached to renew the Independent National Electoral Commission and hold the elections in the first semester of 2023, with parties justifying it due to climatic and logistical conditions.

== Electoral system ==
The signing ceremony of the final document of the consultation between the parties and the Ministry of Interior

On 26 September 2022 all Mauritanian political parties reached an agreement sponsored by the Ministry of Interior and Decentralisation to reform the election system ahead of the upcoming elections after weeks of meetings between all parties.

The 176 members (an increase of 19 members compared to 2018) of the National Assembly will be elected by two methods (with Mauritanians being able to cast four different votes in a parallel voting system); 125 are elected from single- or multi-member electoral districts based on the departments (or moughataas) that the country is subdivided in (Note: Six new departments were created in September 2021, which have led to an increase in seats representing them.) (which the exception of Nouakchott, which has been divided in three 7-seat constituencies for this election based on the three regions (or wilayas) the city is subdivided in instead of the single 18-seat constituency that was used in 2018), using either the two-round system or proportional representation; in single-member constituencies candidates require a majority of the vote to be elected in the first round and a plurality in the second round. In two-seat constituencies, voters vote for a party list (which must contain one man and one woman); if no list receives more than 50% of the vote in the first round, a second round is held, with the winning party taking both seats. In constituencies with three or more seats, closed list proportional representation is used, with seats allocated using the largest remainder method. For three-seat constituencies, party lists must include a female candidate in first or second on the list; for larger constituencies a zipper system is used, with alternate male and female candidates.

The Mauritanian diaspora gets allocated four seats, with this election being the first time Mauritanians in the diaspora are able to directly elect their representatives.

The remaining 51 seats are elected from three nationwide constituencies, also using closed list proportional representation: a 20-seat national list (which uses a zipper system), a 20-seat women's national list and a new 11-seat youth list (with two reserved for people with special needs), which also uses a zipper system to guarantee the representation of women.

=== "One vote" system ===
In November 2022 President Ould Ghazouani called the parties supporting him to support the introduction of a single ballot system in the election, reducing the number of ballots from four to one. It has been suggested that Ghazouani started to further push for this reform after ex-president Ould Abdel Aziz starting working on his election strategy, as the ruling party wants to ensure a victory in the upcoming elections.

Political analyst Abdellahi Ould Mohamed Lemine told Maghreb Voices that he believes that adopting this option in voting will cancel the current method of election, which relies on ability of voters in choosing different parties per ballot (national lists and constituency), and that such reform would benefit the largest parties, especially El Insaf, which is capable of fielding candidates in all constituencies. This reform would also open the door to further disputes between the government and the opposition, which strongly opposed this method.

Tewassoul called on political parties to coordinate to stand up to "the circumvention of the agreement", expressing their surprised at "the recent confusion about issues that were decided by the agreement", in reference to the "one vote" system. The party's spokesperson, Salek Ould Sidi Mahmoud, affirmed that he considers the issue as "an indication that does not encourage confidence in the government's commitment to the [election reform] agreement" and said that "the proposal to unify the card was put forward under the pretext of reducing the void cards, but it is a fact that greatly limits the voter's freedom of choice".

On 16 February 2023, the National Independent Election Commission and the political parties agreed to ditch the idea of a unified ballot, deciding to keep the ballot design as it was.

== Parliamentary composition ==
The table below shows the composition of the parliamentary groups in the chamber when the National Assembly was dissolved on 13 March 2023.

Parliamentary composition at dissolution
Groups	Parties	Legislators	
Groups	Parties	Seats	Total
El Insaf's Parliamentary Group	El Insaf	103	103
Balance Parliamentary Group	UDP	6	24
Balance Parliamentary Group	El Karama	6	24
Balance Parliamentary Group	AND	4	24
Balance Parliamentary Group	PSJN	3	24
Balance Parliamentary Group	HIWAR	1	24
Balance Parliamentary Group	El Islah	1	24
Balance Parliamentary Group	Independent	3 (Note: Representatives of parties disbanded in 2018: El Ghad, UDN and El Wafah + ACD)	24
Tewassoul's Parliamentary Group	Tewassoul	14	14
Sawab-APP's Parliamentary Group	APP	3	7
Sawab-APP's Parliamentary Group	RAG	2 (Note: RAG isn't legally recognised as a political party, and its MPs run with Sawab.)	7
Sawab-APP's Parliamentary Group	Sawab	1	7
Sawab-APP's Parliamentary Group	AJD/MR	1	7
UFP-RFD's Parliamentary Group	RFD	3	7
UFP-RFD's Parliamentary Group	UFP	3	7
UFP-RFD's Parliamentary Group	Independent	1 (Note: MP Mohamed Lemine Ould Sidi Maouloud, elected as member of the now disbanded Choura for Development.)	7
Non-Inscrits	Independent	2 (Note: Representatives of parties disbanded in 2018: El Moustaghbel + PPPD)	2

== Parties and alliances ==
The table below lists parties with parliamentary representation in the 9th National Assembly at the time of dissolution.

Name		Main ideology	Position	Party leader	Deputies	Government
El Insaf		Populism; Liberal conservatism	Centre-right	Mohamed Melainine Ould Eyih	103 / 157	Government
Tewassoul		Sunni Islamism; Religious conservatism	Right-wing	Hamadi Ould Sidi Mokhtar	14 / 157	Opposition
UDP		Centrism; Civic nationalism	Centre	Naha Mint Mouknass	6 / 157	Government
El Karama		Social liberalism Social democracy	Centre	Cheikhna Ould Hajbou	6 / 157	External support
AND		Social democracy	Centre	Yacoub Ould Moine	4 / 157	External support
UFP		Left-wing nationalism Democratic socialism	Left-wing	Mohamed Ould Maouloud	3 / 157	Opposition
RFD		Social democracy	Centre-left	Ahmed Ould Daddah	3 / 157	Opposition
APP		Haratine interests Social liberalism	Centre-left	Messaoud Ould Boulkheir	3 / 157	Opposition
Sawab	RAG	Haratine interests Social democracy	Centre-left	Biram Dah Abeid	2 / 157	Opposition
Sawab	Sawab	Ba'athism; Arab nationalism	Syncretic	Ahmed Salem Ould Horma	1 / 157	Opposition
PSJN		Populism; Youth interests	Big tent	Lalla Mint Cheriva	3 / 157	External support
CVE–CVE/VR	AJD/MR	Black minority interests	Big tent	Ibrahima Moctar Sarr	1 / 157	Opposition
HIWAR		Youth interests Social conservatism	Right-wing	Valle Mint Mini	1 / 157	External support
El Islah		Populism; Reformism	Centre	Mohamed Ould Talebna	1 / 157	External support

In July 2022 the UPR rebranded itself as the Equity Party (El Insaf), electing Minister of Education and government spokesperson Mohamed Melainine Ould Eyih as president of the party, with him leaving the cabinet shortly after to focus on leading the party.

On 5 October 2022 the Union for Planning and Construction (UPC), until then a member of the Coordination of Parties of the Majority, decided to form a coalition with four political movements that were not allowed to be registered as political parties, forming the State of Justice Coalition, which would run under the UPC party label.

On 22 December 2022, Hope Mauritania was presented as a left-leaning opposition alliance which was joined by several major politicians, including ex-MP Kadiata Malick Diallo (ex-UFP) and MPs Mohamed Lemine Ould Sidi Maouloud (ex-Choura) and Elid Ould Mohameden (RFD).

On 25 December 2022, Tewassoul chose MP for Kiffa Hamadi Ould Sidi Mokhtar as the new party leader, replacing Mohamed Mahmoud Ould Seyidi.

== Campaign ==
=== Election debates ===
Private TV channel El Mourabitoun organised several television debates for candidates and representatives of major parties to talk about the election and its campaign and to debate about electoral issues.

2023 Mauritanian parliamentary election debates
Date	Organisers	P Present (Note: Denotes an official party leader.) R Representative NI Not invited													
Date	Organisers	El Insaf	Tewassoul	El Karama	UFP	RFD	APP	Sawab	HIWAR	El Islah	HATEM	CED	Ribat	CAP	Ref.
30 April	El Mourabitoun TV; The Electoral Scene	R Sidi Heiba	R Ahmed Salek	NI	NI	NI	NI	NI	NI	NI	NI	NI	NI	NI	
1 May	El Mourabitoun TV; The Electoral Scene	NI	NI	R Naha	R Dedde	NI	NI	NI	NI	NI	NI	NI	NI	NI	
2 May	El Mourabitoun TV; The Electoral Scene	NI	NI	NI	NI	R El Mehdi	NI	NI	NI	NI	R Deide	NI	NI	NI	
3 May	El Mourabitoun TV; The Electoral Scene	NI	NI	NI	NI	NI	NI	NI	NI	R El Nejib	NI	P Lemrabet	NI	NI	
4 May	El Mourabitoun TV; The Electoral Scene	NI	NI	R Sidi	NI	NI	NI	R Abeid	NI	NI	NI	NI	NI	NI	
5 May	El Mourabitoun TV; The Electoral Scene	R Arafat	NI	NI	NI	NI	R Barka	NI	NI	NI	NI	NI	NI	NI	
7 May	El Mourabitoun TV; The Electoral Scene	R El Ghassem	NI	NI	NI	NI	NI	NI	R Baba Ahmed	NI	NI	NI	NI	NI	
10 May	El Mourabitoun TV; The Electoral Scene	NI	NI	NI	NI	NI	NI	NI	NI	NI	NI	NI	R Eilal	R Nebagha	

== Opinion polls ==
Polling firm	Fieldwork date	Sample size	Abs.	UPR	RNRD	UDP	El Karama	AND	UFP	APP	HATEM	Others	N/A	Lead
Arab Barometer	21 November 2021 – 25 January 2022	2,000	10.40	18.60	5.95	2.50	1.35	1.50	3.05	3.20	1.65	1.85% El Wiam on 1.15% PNDD-ADIL on 0.7%	49.0	12.65
2018 election	1 Sep 2018	–	27.54	19.47	11.28	4.34	3.52	3.15	2.80	1.84	0.93	–	–	8.19

== Conduct ==
Polling stations opened at 7AM local time (GMT). Armed and security forces voted on the same day as the rest of eligible voters, breaking an old tradition of them voting the day before the scrutiny. An election observation mission was sent by the African Union.

Voting was stopped on at least three polling stations in Magta Lahjar after a grievance was submitted by El Insaf due to ballots missing for the local elections in these polling stations.

Tewassoul asked for voting to be stopped in four polling stations in a village of Boutilimit and the dismissal of the head of the National Independent Election Commission (CENI) in the department of Boutlimit. In a statement, the party said it was "surprised" by the replacement of the heads of the four offices, "after the spread of audio clips of the head of CENI's branch in Boutilimit, directed by some of the activists and leaders of El Insaf in the department". The party pointed out that "under these suspicious changes, the head of El Insaf's youth wing in Boutilimit was appointed head of one of the four polling stations, while the remaining three appointed are activists known for their relations with the leadership of El Insaf and influential military figures, unlike the heads of the polling stations who remained accredited until yesterday [12 May] afternoon".

Polling stations closed at 7PM local time, with polling stations that opened late being opened for the same duration of the delay. Both parties in government and opposition parties complained about the voting process, with Tewassoul's leader qualifying the election as "messy" and "disorganised"; while El Insaf also insisted on them being affected by the delays and some of their representatives being prevented from entering polling stations. Meanwhile, the National Independent Election Commission praised the election for being conducted in a "calm and responsible atmosphere", insisting that there were no significant incidents that could impact the results or the credibility of the election.

CENI announced during the scrutiny of votes that it detected the manipulation of the results of the El Mina department of Nouakchott where some votes were transferred from the null and neutral cards to a particular candidate, confirming that the matter had been corrected, and judicial procedures had taken its course after a candidate complained about the results and an inner investigation was launched.

== Voter turnout ==
=== Turnout updates ===
Time
12:00	16:00	18:30
18.00%	31.24%	41.12%

=== Turnout by wilaya ===
Wilaya	N	W	Y	D
Adrar	71.27%	71.57%	71.61%	71.64%
Assaba	73.41%	73.01%	73.22%	73.87%
Brakna	76.82%	76.66%	76.49%	76.90%
Dakhlet Nouadhibou	69.64%	69.66%	69.42%	69.51%
Gorgol	77.37%	77.13%	77.36%	77.07%
Guidimagha	81.74%	81.70%	81.49%	81.40%
Hodh Ech Chargui	75.69%	75.87%	75.71%	76.86%
Hodh El Gharbi	77.23%	77.35%	77.19%	77.66%
Inchiri	61.24%	60.91%	77.19%	60.89%
Nouakchott-Nord	61.22%	61.29%	61.29%	61.10%
Nouakchott-Ouest	61.46%	61.19%	61.14%	60.88%
Nouakchott-Sud	66.83%	67.04%	66.76%	66.63%
Tagant	74.15%	73.91%	74.12%	74.39%
Tiris Zemmour	71.33%	71.18%	71.33%	71.21%
Trarza	67.58%	67.47%	67.53%	67.61%
Diaspora	62.49%	62.42%	62.52%	62.46%
Total	71.59%	71.53%	71.50%	71.71%

=== Turnout by district ===
District	N	W	Y	D
Adel Begrou	72.02%	72.26%	72.35%	72.57%
Aïoun	74.86%	74.64%	74.42%	74.79%
Akjoujt	70.55%	70.59%	70.63%	70.58%
Aleg	76.93%	76.74%	76.56%	77.35%
Amourj	76.17%	76.65%	76.46%	78.02%
Aoujeft	76.64%	77.03%	77.77%	77.83%
Atar	69.23%	69.72%	69.48%	69.59%
Bababé	76.09%	76.31%	76.05%	76.26%
Barkéol	75.39%	74.95%	75.26%	76.56%
Bassiknou	79.46%	79.60%	78.90%	78.99%
Bénichab	54.40%	53.81%	54.26%	53.77%
Bir Moghrein	70.03%	69.22%	70.39%	69.83%
Boghé	78.18%	78.05%	78.30%	78.00%
Boumdeid	70.24%	70.32%	69.76%	70.83%
Boutilimit	65.82%	66.04%	66.05%	66.50%
Chami	59.09%	59.04%	58.85%	58.97%
Chinguetti	67.58%	67.39%	67.27%	67.25%
Djiguenni	82.98%	83.08%	82.83%	82.73%
F'Déirick	78.22%	78.11%	78.34%	78.11%
Ghabou	83.19%	83.19%	82.72%	82.71%
Guerou	75.14%	75.02%	74.86%	74.99%
Kaédi	74.89%	74.92%	75.07%	74.56%
Kankoussa	73.92%	73.39%	73.81%	73.67%
Keur Macène	70.03%	69.82%	70.10%	69.71%
Kiffa	71.77%	71.26%	71.60%	72.35%
Koubenni	83.21%	84.24%	83.38%	83.85%
Lexeiba	75.66%	75.66%	75.06%	75.46%
M'Bagne	75.39%	74.88%	74.76%	75.45%
M'Bout	77.06%	76.54%	77.39%	76.48%
Maghama	81.72%	81.74%	81.49%	81.39%
Magta Lahjar	76.37%	76.62%	76.42%	76.34%
Male	77.46%	76.57%	76.00%	77.52%
Méderdra	71.88%	71.94%	71.94%	71.43%
Monguel	78.87%	78.25%	78.43%	79.19%
Moudjéria	73.86%	73.24%	73.75%	74.50%
N'beiket Lahwach	71.05%	70.93%	71.39%	76.26%
Néma	71.93%	72.02%	71.94%	72.50%
Nouadhibou	71.65%	71.69%	71.44%	71.52%
Nouakchott-Nord	61.22%	61.29%	61.29%	61.10%
Nouakchott-Ouest	61.46%	61.19%	61.14%	60.88%
Nouakchott-Sud	66.83%	67.04%	66.76%	66.63%
Ouad Naga	61.83%	61.39%	61.40%	62.02%
Ouadane	78.72%	78.69%	78.80%	78.13%
Oualata	67.86%	67.89%	67.90%	69.93%
Ould Yengé	81.63%	81.65%	81.19%	81.73%
R'Kiz	65.86%	65.83%	65.91%	65.48%
Rosso	72.18%	72.16%	72.13%	72.06%
Sélibaby	79.36%	79.16%	79.43%	78.38%
Tamchekett	77.29%	77.44%	77.31%	77.27%
Tékane	72.87%	72.53%	72.68%	72.81%
Tichitt	75.17%	74.98%	75.55%	75.25%
Tidjikja	74.30%	74.50%	74.26%	74.05%
Timbédra	76.24%	76.55%	76.40%	79.14%
Tintane	72.91%	72.48%	73.08%	73.74%
Touil	79.34%	79.36%	79.12%	79.35%
Wompou	83.86%	83.88%	83.70%	83.96%
Zouérate	70.06%	70.04%	69.96%	69.96%
Africa	60.64%	60.82%	60.20%	61.10%
America	73.37%	72.44%	73.70%	72.14%
Asia	50.14%	49.58%	50.14%	49.91%
Europe	73.01%	73.53%	73.50%	73.11%
Total	71.59%	71.53%	71.50%	71.71%

== Results ==
El Insaf secured a majority in the National Assembly and increased its national list vote percentage, in part due to the smaller number of parties contesting this election. The party was forced into several runoffs and did not sweep into all constituencies elected through a general ticket as in 2018. The opposition saw a complete restructuring, with the left-wing UFP, the centre-left RFD and the APP, which represents Haratine interests, losing all of their seats in the National Assembly, with the left-leaning Hope Mauritania replaced them as the hegemonic left-wing opposition.

Party	National mixed list			National women's list			National youth list			Seats		
Party	Votes	%	Seats	Votes	%	Seats	Votes	%	Seats	Districts	Total	+/−
El Insaf	342,153	35.25	7	329,354	34.37	7	333,398	34.62	4	89	107	+14
National Rally for Reform and Development	99,431	10.24	2	103,363	10.79	2	103,056	10.70	1	6	11	−3
Union for Democracy and Progress	58,823	6.06	1	59,397	6.20	1	58,983	6.12	1	7	10	+4
Sawab and allies	39,807	4.10	1	38,546	4.02	1	38,480	4.00	1	2	5	+2
Republican Front for Unity and Democracy and allies	32,296	3.33	1	35,722	3.73	1	33,847	3.51	1	4	7	New
National Democratic Alliance	32,027	3.30	1	26,312	2.75	1	29,143	3.03	1	3	6	+2
El Islah	31,877	3.28	1	33,314	3.48	1	32,946	3.42	1	3	6	+5
Mauritanian Party of Union and Change	28,124	2.90	1	32,660	3.41	1	31,988	3.32	1	0	3	+2
El Karama	25,437	2.62	1	23,592	2.46	1	24,318	2.52	0	3	5	−1
Nida El Watan	24,268	2.50	1	25,020	2.61	1	25,316	2.63	0	3	5	+5
Alliance for Justice and Democracy/Movement for Renewal and allies	21,163	2.18	1	19,550	2.04	1	19,666	2.04	0	2	4	+3
Party of Conciliation and Prosperity	20,208	2.08	1	20,053	2.09	1	18,539	1.92	0	1	3	+2
Party of the Mauritanian Masses	20,206	2.08	1	13,901	1.45	0	11,218	1.16	0	0	1	+1
Republican Party for Democracy and Renewal	19,110	1.97	0	15,880	1.66	0	15,291	1.59	0	0	0	0
Union of the Forces of Progress	17,387	1.79	0	16,379	1.71	0	15,709	1.63	0	0	0	−3
El Vadila	17,303	1.78	0	20,589	2.15	1	16,850	1.75	0	1	2	+2
Party of Unity and Development	16,134	1.66	0	15,608	1.63	0	18,950	1.97	0	0	0	0
Union for Planning and Building and allies	15,028	1.55	0	16,550	1.73	0	25,089	2.60	0	1	1	+1
Rally of Democratic Forces	14,648	1.51	0	12,040	1.26	0	13,937	1.45	0	0	0	−3
Burst of Youth for the Nation	14,345	1.48	0	10,374	1.08	0	10,728	1.11	0	0	0	−3
El Ravah	13,858	1.43	0	13,838	1.44	0	16,224	1.68	0	0	0	0
People's Progressive Alliance	12,115	1.25	0	13,123	1.37	0	12,553	1.30	0	0	0	−3
National Cohesion for Rights and the Construction of Generations	10,420	1.07	0	13,532	1.41	0	10,437	1.08	0	0	0	0
Party of Construction and Progress	9,281	0.96	0	10,628	1.11	0	6,052	0.63	0	0	0	0
Centre through Action for Progress	8,813	0.91	0	10,699	1.12	0	13,294	1.38	0	0	0	New
Blank votes	26,291	2.71	–	28,138	2.94	–	27,120	2.82	–	–	–	–
Total	970,553	100.00	20	958,162	100.00	20	963,132	100.00	11	125	176	+19
Valid votes	970,553	75.88		958,162	74.98		963,132	75.41				
Invalid/blank votes	308,433	24.12		319,673	25.02		314,128	24.59				
Total votes	1,278,986	100.00		1,277,835	100.00		1,277,260	100.00				
Registered voters/turnout	1,786,448	71.59		1,786,448	71.53		1,786,448	71.50				
Source: National Independent Election Commission (CENI)

=== National list results by wilaya ===
Party	AD	AS	BR	DN	GO	GU	HC	HG	IN	NN	NO	NS	TA	TZ	TR	XM	MRT
El Insaf	37.42%	33.59%	37.54%	23.41%	28.49%	29.25%	40.13%	30.02%	46.30%	28.41%	26.00%	37.87%	49.67%	30.17%	48.70%	20.04%	35.26%
Tewassoul	7.61%	17.13%	6.34%	7.93%	4.02%	6.18%	9.16%	13.33%	6.30%	16.32%	10.90%	14.26%	6.42%	10.71%	10.07%	20.25%	10.25%
UDP	2.32%	2.19%	4.08%	4.07%	15.54%	25.50%	10.35%	6.60%	8.02%	2.71%	2.74%	1.82%	3.60%	4.87%	0.90%	4.03%	6.06%
Sawab–RAG	1.96%	2.86%	1.88%	5.59%	3.75%	13.39%	1.55%	1.15%	2.72%	5.28%	3.98%	5.65%	0.88%	3.30%	4.86%	13.83%	4.10%
Hope MR	1.03%	0.79%	4.93%	4.77%	3.04%	1.55%	0.47%	0.77%	1.20%	3.84%	6.67%	8.02%	0.59%	8.73%	3.14%	5.50%	3.33%
AND	2.22%	2.79%	1.01%	2.91%	6.26%	6.51%	2.59%	0.87%	2.76%	7.08%	4.50%	1.78%	1.99%	1.63%	3.55%	1.58%	3.30%
El Islah	13.26%	3.34%	1.71%	2.17%	1.54%	0.48%	4.70%	5.34%	2.08%	2.80%	4.24%	2.15%	3.11%	10.71%	2.35%	2.65%	3.28%
HATEM	1.76%	3.37%	0.98%	3.03%	0.38%	0.35%	5.74%	11.79%	1.54%	2.18%	2.07%	3.41%	1.43%	3.01%	1.32%	1.49%	2.90%
El Karama	0.62%	0.46%	5.55%	13.07%	8.99%	0.96%	1.22%	1.35%	0.51%	0.94%	1.14%	1.67%	0.45%	0.37%	0.56%	1.05%	2.62%
NW	0.69%	8.03%	0.59%	0.73%	0.75%	0.24%	2.64%	7.00%	1.29%	1.32%	3.01%	1.31%	0.63%	1.12%	2.79%	1.35%	2.50%
AJD/MR+	0.37%	0.23%	6.50%	5.71%	4.42%	0.61%	0.15%	0.15%	1.46%	0.89%	3.08%	3.26%	0.09%	2.00%	0.35%	9.88%	2.18%
HIWAR	6.48%	3.87%	3.44%	2.20%	1.76%	1.62%	3.10%	1.71%	1.85%	0.88%	0.60%	0.77%	0.88%	2.08%	1.41%	0.67%	2.08%
PMM	3.87%	1.54%	0.66%	1.29%	0.46%	0.56%	1.97%	3.65%	1.26%	2.41%	4.07%	1.39%	1.43%	3.43%	3.35%	1.23%	2.08%
PRDR	1.06%	5.70%	1.38%	2.38%	4.74%	0.18%	0.63%	1.93%	1.12%	1.97%	1.39%	0.94%	1.51%	0.94%	1.53%	1.10%	1.97%
UFP	1.79%	2.97%	1.76%	1.69%	3.18%	1.41%	0.93%	1.04%	1.38%	2.02%	2.31%	1.91%	2.90%	1.58%	0.86%	1.16%	1.79%
El Vadila	1.08%	2.13%	4.44%	0.81%	1.29%	2.37%	1.08%	2.27%	0.60%	1.82%	1.05%	0.99%	2.13%	1.53%	0.87%	1.81%	1.78%
PUD	1.32%	0.65%	4.26%	0.99%	1.15%	0.42%	0.79%	3.40%	0.62%	1.93%	2.73%	0.83%	2.37%	0.70%	0.51%	1.63%	1.66%
CED	2.47%	0.73%	0.54%	1.95%	0.30%	0.27%	0.96%	0.81%	1.55%	2.38%	5.36%	1.75%	2.05%	2.24%	1.71%	2.35%	1.55%
RFD	0.83%	0.61%	1.23%	3.68%	0.67%	0.14%	1.48%	0.90%	1.47%	2.89%	2.51%	1.09%	2.76%	1.09%	1.86%	3.23%	1.51%
PSJN	1.89%	1.39%	3.64%	1.31%	4.61%	0.43%	0.94%	0.46%	0.46%	1.33%	0.89%	0.62%	1.55%	0.82%	0.32%	0.38%	1.48%
El Ravah	2.94%	0.66%	0.98%	1.25%	0.36%	1.14%	1.28%	0.75%	1.00%	1.37%	1.51%	0.96%	10.04%	0.53%	1.54%	0.92%	1.43%
APP	1.27%	0.56%	1.95%	1.47%	0.85%	1.77%	1.01%	0.55%	0.46%	1.91%	0.98%	2.58%	1.07%	2.52%	0.72%	0.67%	1.25%
Ribat	1.45%	0.25%	0.41%	3.39%	0.31%	0.52%	0.91%	0.30%	10.62%	2.59%	2.39%	0.95%	0.57%	2.30%	0.45%	0.85%	1.07%
PCP	0.72%	1.38%	1.13%	0.88%	0.60%	0.23%	1.19%	1.37%	0.57%	1.64%	1.33%	0.86%	0.42%	0.50%	0.61%	0.52%	0.96%
CAP	0.33%	0.25%	0.23%	0.56%	0.45%	0.31%	0.25%	0.24%	0.30%	0.65%	1.18%	0.71%	0.19%	0.38%	3.75%	0.14%	0.91%
Blank votes	3.24%	2.53%	2.84%	2.76%	2.09%	3.61%	4.78%	2.25%	2.56%	2.44%	3.37%	2.45%	1.27%	2.74%	1.92%	1.69%	2.70%
Valid votes	81.73%	64.79%	79.47%	86.82%	76.72%	78.37%	51.47%	67.24%	85.86%	85.33%	85.43%	85.76%	77.95%	86.63%	86.10%	86.30%	75.88%
Null votes	18.27%	35.21%	20.53%	13.18%	23.28%	21.63%	48.53%	32.76%	14.14%	14.67%	14.57%	14.24%	22.05%	13.37%	13.90%	13.70%	24.12%
Turnout	71.27%	73.41%	76.82%	69.64%	77.37%	81.74%	75.69%	77.23%	61.24%	61.22%	61.46%	66.83%	74.15%	71.33%	67.58%	62.49%	71.59%
Abstentions	28.73%	26.59%	23.18%	30.36%	22.63%	18.26%	24.31%	22.77%	38.76%	38.78%	38.54%	33.17%	25.85%	28.67%	32.42%	37.51%	28.41%
Registered voters	53,331	164,442	180,078	66,423	135,491	91,826	198,099	152,255	19,789	120,387	141,914	119,367	55,836	28,182	236,739	22,289	1,786,448
Source: National Independent Election Commission (CENI)

=== Results by electoral district ===
Wilaya	District	Seats won											Total	
Wilaya	District	El Insaf	Tewassoul	UDP	Sawab+	Hope MR	AND	El Islah	El Karama	NW	AJD/MR+	Others	Total	
Adrar	Aoujeft	1											1	5
Adrar	Atar	2											2	5
Adrar	Chinguetti	1											1	5
Adrar	Ouadane							1					1	5
Assaba	Barkéol	2											2	10
Assaba	Boumdeid	1											1	10
Assaba	Guerou		1									1 (Note: El Vadila (elected in coalition with Tewassoul) (1))	2	10
Assaba	Kankoussa	2											2	10
Assaba	Kiffa	1								1		1 (Note: HIWAR (1))	3	10
Brakna	Aleg	2											2	12
Brakna	Bababé	2											2	12
Brakna	Boghé	2											2	12
Brakna	Magta Lahjar	2											2	12
Brakna	Male	2											2	12
Brakna	M'Bagne	2											2	12
Dakhlet Nouadhibou	Chami	1											1	5
Dakhlet Nouadhibou	Nouadhibou	1	1						1		1		4	5
Gorgol	Kaédi	1		1							1		3	11
Gorgol	Lexeiba	1											1	11
Gorgol	Maghama	2											2	11
Gorgol	M'Bout	1					1		1				3	11
Gorgol	Monguel	2											2	11
Guidimagha	Ghabou			2									2	8
Guidimagha	Ould Yengé			2									2	8
Guidimagha	Sélibaby	2											2	8
Guidimagha	Wompou	2											2	8
Hodh Ech Chargui	Adel Begrou	2											2	14
Hodh Ech Chargui	Amourj	2											2	14
Hodh Ech Chargui	Bassiknou	2											2	14
Hodh Ech Chargui	Djigueni	2											2	14
Hodh Ech Chargui	N'Beiket Lahwach	1											1	14
Hodh Ech Chargui	Néma	2											2	14
Hodh Ech Chargui	Oualata	1											1	14
Hodh Ech Chargui	Timbédra	2											2	14
Hodh El Gharbi	Aïoun El Atrous	2											2	10
Hodh El Gharbi	Koubenni	1		1						1			3	10
Hodh El Gharbi	Tamchekett	2											2	10
Hodh El Gharbi	Tintane	2											2	10
Hodh El Gharbi	Touil									1			1	10
Inchiri	Akjoujt	1											1	2
Inchiri	Bénichab	1											1	2
Nouakchott-Nord		2	1	1	1	1	1						7	21
Nouakchott-Ouest		2	1			1	1	1				1 (Note: CED (elected in coalition with El Vadila) (1))	7	21
Nouakchott-Sud		3	1		1	1			1				7	21
Tagant	Moudjéria	2											2	5
Tagant	Tichitt	1											1	5
Tagant	Tidjikja	2											2	5
Tiris Zemmour	Bir Moghrein							1					1	4
Tiris Zemmour	F'Déirick	1											1	4
Tiris Zemmour	Zouérate	2											2	4
Trarza	Boutilimit	2											2	14
Trarza	Keur Macéne	2											2	14
Trarza	Méderdra	2											2	14
Trarza	Ouad Naga	2											2	14
Trarza	R'Kiz	2											2	14
Trarza	Rosso	2											2	14
Trarza	Tékane	2											2	14
Diaspora	Africa	1											1	4
Diaspora	America					1							1	4
Diaspora	Asia		1										1	4
Diaspora	Europe	1											1	4
Total		89	6	7	2	4	3	3	3	3	2	3	125	
Source: National Independent Election Commission (CENI)

=== Maps ===
Winner per wilaya (national list vote).

== Aftermath ==
Hope Mauritania endorsed the rest of opposition parties qualified in the runoff (Tewassoul, Sawab+, AJD/MR+).

President Mohamed Ould Ghazouani welcomed the results.

=== Accusations of election fraud ===
The opposition called for elections to be repeated in Nouakchott and Boutilimit due to "massive fraud", calling for nationwide protests on 25 May. The opposition also announced their intention to form a committee to jointly file appeals on the election results and warned that the "current electoral crisis", if not dealt with wisely and quickly in a consultative framework, would turn into a political one.

On the other side, parties belonging to the Coordination of Parties of the Majority, supportive of President Ghazouani, and other unaligned parties signed a petition demanding the immediate halt of the counting process and a complete repeat election nationwide due to the alleged "violations" the parties monitored and that "have characterized all the course of this process, from the first moments of the electoral census".

=== Arrest of Biram Dah Abeid ===
Leader of the Democratic Alternation Coalition and re-elected deputy for Sawab+ Biram Dah Abeid was arrested on 24 May after he declared that if the results of the elections are accepted, then "the free Mauritanians will carry weapons against the current regime" during a political rally the day before. He also said in his speech that he was "committed to peace" but that he "wouldn't lie to the Mauritanian people" and that "election fraud was the reason the army couped former president Maaouya Ould Sid'Ahmed Taya".

The arrest was condemned by opposition parties RAG, Sawab, Hope Mauritania, the Union of the Forces of Progress, the Rally of Democratic Forces, and the People's Progressive Alliance.

A protest was held in front of the Security Department by members and supporters of the Initiative for the Resurgence of the Abolitionist Movement, which Dah Abeid heads. The protest saw the arrest of another elected deputy (Aminetou El Hacen Boughel, elected on the youth national list for Sawab+), Dah Abeid's wife and a number of activists and protestors.

Sawab's leader and his deputy were allowed to visit Dah Abeid during his arrest in a police station in Dar Naïm, while his wife and his lawyesrs denounced that they weren't allowed to visit him.

The spokesperson of the Mauritanian government justified Dah Abeid's arrest saying that his words "crossed a line" and that "no one is above the law, everyone is equal before the law, and the government's task is to apply the law equally to everyone".

Biram Dah Abeid was released after two days of arrest on 26 May, with him returning to his house in Riyadh, Nouakchott. He declared after his release that he expected to be detained until after the 2024 presidential election as part of an operation to "prevent a peaceful transfer of power" and that his arrest was done to thwart or disrupt the opposition rally held on 25 May. He said that he would continue to "fight peacefully" but that he was not going to stop from "alerting Mauritanians of the risks facing the country".

=== Election of the President of the National Assembly ===
The election of the President of the National Assembly took place on 19 June 2023. Mohamed Bemba Meguett was elected president in the first round.

Candidate	Party	Votes obtained
Required majority →		89 out of 176
Mohamed Bemba Meguett	El Insaf	137
Ahmedou Mohamed Mahfoudh M'Balla	Tewassoul	27
Abstentions		2
Null votes		3
Absentees		7

=== Deregistration of political parties ===
Five political parties were legally deregistered on 19 October 2023 after failing to obtain 1% in two consecutive local elections. The parties were:

- Party of the Mauritanian Masses (PMM), holding one deputy and two regional councillours;
- Republican Party for Democracy and Renewal (PRDR), holding one regional councillour;
- Burst of Youth for the Nation (PSJN), holding one regional councillour;
- National Cohesion for Rights and the Construction of Generations (Ribat), holding three regional councillours;
- Party of Construction and Progress (PCP), holding no national or regional elected office.
