= El Wiam =

Political party in Mauritania

El Wiam (French: Parti de l'Entente Démocratique et Sociale, lit. 'Party of the Democratic and Social Agreement', PEDS) was a centrist political party in Mauritania led by former minister Boydiel Ould Houmeid. It was made up mainly of officials from the government of President Maaouya Ould Taya.

== History ==
El Wiam was one of the many opposition groups which took part in the 2011–2012 protests against the authoritarian rule of Mohamed Ould Abdel Aziz. The party won ten seats in the 2013 parliamentary elections, emerging as the third largest party in the National Assembly. It nominated Boydiel Ould Houmeid as its candidate for the 2014 presidential elections. Ould Houmeid finished third out of five candidates with 4.5% of the vote. Ould Houmeid was elected vice-president of the National Assembly in 2018.

The party merged into the governing Union for the Republic on 28 October 2018 after losing several seats on the September 2018 parliamentary elections.
