= Union for the Republic (Mauritania) =

Defunct political party in Mauritania

Union for the Republic الاتحاد من أجل الجمهورية
- President: Sidi Mohamed Ould Taleb Omar
- Founder: Mohamed Ould Abdel Aziz
- Founded: 5 May 2009
- Dissolved: 3 July 2022
- Succeeded by: Equity Party
- Headquarters: Nouakchott
- Ideology: Populism; Economic liberalism
- Political position: Centre to centre-right
- National affiliation: Coalition of the Majority
- International affiliation: Centrist Democrat International

Website
- www.upr.mr

The Union for the Republic (Arabic: الاتحاد من أجل الجمهورية; French: Union pour la République, UPR) was a political party in Mauritania. The party was formed on 5 May 2009 by Mohamed Ould Abdel Aziz after he resigned from the military, to run for President of Mauritania. Aziz resigned as chairman of the party on 2 August 2009 after winning the presidential election, as the President of Mauritania cannot be a member of any party. The party also won 13 of the 17 seats up for re-election to the Mauritanian Senate in 2009, giving the UPR control of a total of 38 of the 53 Senate seats.

As a result of the 2018 parliamentary election, UPR became the largest political party in Mauritania. Four major political parties merged into the UPR after the election. On October 18, 2018, a month after the previous legislative election, the Unionist Party for the Construction of Mauritania voted to merge itself into the UPR. On the 21st, Choura for Development adopted the same decision, while centrist El Wiam, which used to be on the moderate opposition, did the same on the 29th. The last party to merge into the UPR was the National Pact for Democracy and Development, which was the previous ruling party from 2007 until 2008's coup. PNDD-ADIL merged into the UPR on December 27, 2019.

The party refounded itself as the Equity Party on 3 July 2022.

== Election results ==
=== Presidential ===
President of the Islamic Republic of Mauritania
Election year	Candidate	1st round			2nd round			Result	Winning candidate
Election year	Candidate	Votes	%	Rank	Votes	%	Rank	Result	Winning candidate
2009	Mohamed Ould Abdel Aziz	409,024	52.54	1st	—N/a			Won	Mohamed Ould Abdel Aziz
2014	Mohamed Ould Abdel Aziz	577,995	81.89	1st	—N/a			Won	Mohamed Ould Abdel Aziz
2019	Mohamed Ould Ghazouani	483,007	52.00	1st	—N/a			Won	Mohamed Ould Ghazouani

=== National Assembly elections ===
Election	Party leader	PR seats		Women's seats		Constituency seats				Seats	+/–	Position
Election	Party leader	Votes	%	Votes	%	First round		Second round		Seats	+/–	Position
Election	Party leader	Votes	%	Votes	%	Votes	%	Votes	%	Seats	+/–	Position
2013	Mohamed Mahmoud Ould Mohamed Lemine	127,580	21.34%	138,651	24.74%	299,605	39.21%	124,656	55.11%	75 / 146	▲75	▲1st
2018	Mohamed Mahmoud Ould Mohamed Lemine	136,809	19.47%	135,831	19.60%					93 / 157	▲18	1st

== Presidents of the Union for the Republic ==
- Mohamed Ould Abdel Aziz, 5 May 2009 – 2 August 2009
- Mohamed Mahmoud Ould Mohamed Lemine, 2 August 2009 – 29 December 2019
- Sidi Mohamed Ould Taleb Omar, 29 December 2019 – 3 July 2022.
