= List of candidates in the 2023 Mauritanian parliamentary election =

Candidates in the upcoming Mauritanian parliamentary election

This is the list of candidates for the 2023 Mauritanian parliamentary election, per constituency. 25 parties were legally registered by the National Independent Election Commission and thus allowed to run in the election, with some coalitions running under the lists of a party.

The provisional lists were published by the National Independent Election Commission on a website on 12 April 2023, as the deadline expired on 13 April 2023.

== National lists ==
National list

#	List
1	Mauritanian Party of Union and Change (HATEM): 1. Saleh Mohamedou Hanana; 2. Abdalahi Barar Side Lemeine Side Lemin; 3. M'Kemeltou Cheikh Sidi Mohamed Cheikhna Hamahoullah; 4. Mohamed El Moctar Cheikh Sidi Ely Abdella; 5. Mariem Ely Ethmane; 6. Mohamed Saleh Sidi Ould Ramdhan; 7. Lekhaile Ethmane Abderrahmane; 8. Ely Mahmoud Mohamed Lemine Mohamed Lemine; 9. Sid'Elemin Mohamed Abdellahi; 10. Teghle Mohamed Abeid; 11. Emna Saleh Hanana; 12. El Arabiya El Moctar Sidi Ahmed Naghi; 13. Ethmane Sid'Ahmed Ahmed Aida; 14. Fatimetou Cheikh Saad Bouh Cheikh Mohamed Vadel; 15. Khaled Mahfoudh Sidi Mhamed; 16. Toutou Yahya Karime; 17. Ekleithem Ahmed Lemrabet; 18. Aicha Mohamed El Bechir El Jili; 19. Sid'Ahmed Taleb Ely Keiri; 20. Mohamed Ahmed Mohamed El Moctar Khaye; Substitutes
2	Party of Conciliation and Prosperity (HIWAR): 1. Mohamed Ahmed Mohamed Cheikh Sid' Ahmed Wejih; 2. Mohamed El Moctar Mohamed Mahmoud Abd El Maleck; 3. Miny Sidi Brahim; 4. Vatma Salka Sidi Lemttoura; 5. Demba Remdhane Sid; 6. Cheikhna Amar Boudadda; 7. Mariem Mohamed Baba Tawf; 8. Mariem Sidi Didi; 9. Hamdy Sidi Guettay; 10. Sid'Ahmed Ely Babah; 11. Selem Arbi Bakar M'Bareck; 12. Vatimetou Cheikhna; 13. Taleb Sedigh Hademine Abdel Jebar; 14. Mohemed Ahmed Mahem Taleb Sidi; 15. Mareim Mohamed Cheikhna; 16. Vatimetou Lekwar Jamea; 17. Mohamed Mahmoud Lekbir Beya; 18. Abd El Jebar Hademine Abd El Jebar; 19. Taghla Lekwar Jamee; 20. Achata Mohamed Cheikhna; Substitutes: 1. Ahmed Hademine Abdel Jebar; 2. Mariem Sidi Bobacar Maham
3	Republican Party for Democracy and Renewal (PRDR): 1. Yacoub Mohamed Abd El Wedoud El Benya; 2. Mohamed El Hacen Mohamed Ahmed Taleb; 3. Aïcha Mohamed El-Mokhtar Ebnou; 4. Mariem Mohamed Abdallahi Jed Oummou; 5. El Hecene Sid' Elemine Lehzam; 6. Cheibani Sid'Ahmed El Meydane; 7. Khayi Lekbeid Ahmed Zeidane; 8. Tata Brahim Khayar; 9. Sidi Mohamed Houssein Hobed; 10. Mohamed Fall Mohamed El Hadj Sidi; 11. Mariem Messoud Abeidy; 12. Amineta Hamadi Sow; 13. Sidi Moctar Hemet Abeid; 14. Khadijetou Sidi Abdallah El Waly; 15. Sidi Mohamed Mohamed Mahmoud Didi; 16. Fatimetou Mohamed Maouloud Abbou; 17. Aly El Khadhar M'Boirick; 18. Mounina Sidi Boune; 19. Mohamed El Moustapha Sidi Abdalla El Wely; 20. Aishetou Mohamed Mahmoud Abd El Ghoudousse; Substitutes: 1. Aminetou Mohamed Aliyene Khatry; 2. Mohamed Abdallahi Sid El Moctar Taye
4	Party of Construction and Progress (PCP): 1. Mohamed Vall Mohamed Issa; 2. Ahmed Tall Brahim Mohamed Vall; 3. Toutou Ahmedou Bamba Sidi Ahmed; 4. Ahmed Aboubekrine Abdarahmae; 5. Bebana Bah Abdy; 6. Demba Baradji Soumare; 7. Aichetou N'Diaye Mohamed Alada; 8. Maghlaha Ahmedou Mohamed Vall; 9. Teyib Mahfoud Issa; 10. Ramatoulaye Abdarrahmane Bâ; 11. Ahmed Ra'i Mahmoud; 12. Fatimetou Isselmou Nebach; 13. Isselmou M'Bareck M'Bareck; 14. Cheikhna Nekhterou El Moctar; 15. Hindou Ely Bousselhab; 16. Oum Kelthoum Djeih Mohamdi; 17. Rcky Mamadou Bsoyk Sy; 18. Jibril Mohamed Moussa; 19. Brahim El Khalil Aboubekrine Abderrahmane; 20. Cheikh Saleh Mohamed Vall Issa; Substitutes: 1. Aichetou Mohamed Issa; 2. Aichetou Ely Mery
5	El Karama: 1. Nagi Mohamed Eterkzi; 2. Ahmed Mahfoudh Hassny; 3. Aminetou Amadou Kane; 4. Hemy Mohamedena Lemrabott; 5. Ahmed Salem Ahmedou Zeidan; 6. Sidi El Moctar Lehbouss; 7. Zeinabou El Hacen Bari; 8. Mohamed Lemine Hamed Nasser Dine; 9. Ahmed Taleb Taleb; 10. Aminetou Ahmedou Achour; 11. Nebghouhe Taleb Elwely; 12. Yahfdhou Sidi Mouhamed Mohamed Lemine; 13. Sidi Mohamed Brahim Sidi Abdella; 14. Salma El Hacen Bilal; 15. Mohamed Saiid Yehdih Brahim; 16. Ahmed Kacheif Bilal; 17. Tahya Mahfoudh H'meiti; Substitutes: 1. Taleb Mohamed Jeode Maaloum; 2. Cheikh Abdou Mohamdi
6	El Islah: 1. Mohamed Ahmed Salem Talebna; 2. Mohamed Mahmoud Zoubeir Zoubeir; 3. Fatimetou Lebchara Hedye; 4. Techkille Amar Salem Egouchatt; 5. Ousmane El Hacen Yongane; 6. Saleck Sidi Mohamed Ebbali Fadili; 7. Aychetou Abdel Waddoud Mohamed; 8. Meinat Youba Camara; 9. Sidi Mohamed Mohamed Yacoub M'Hamed; 10. Moctar Meissara Meissara; 11. Fatimetou Karamako Sidibé; 12. Aicha Emy Cheikhna Ille; 13. Moctar Abderahim Sakho; 14. Yahya Hamed Ouda'A; 15. Zeinebou Tourad Ahmedou; 16. S'Bah Mohamed Avouchal; 17. Sidi Mohamed Cheikh Eberraz; 18. Nouha Mohamed Belkhair; 19. Fatimetou S'Digh M'Bareck; 20. Djiby Yaya Diop
7	El Ravah: 1. Mohamed Ahmed Vall; 2. Ahmed Mohamed Ahmed Taleb; 3. Hanane Sidi Mohamed Zeine; 4. Oumoulkheir Moustapha Moulaye El Abass; 5. Cheikh Malainine El Wely Lechiakh Cheikh Mohamed Vadel Cheikh Malainine; 6. Cheikh Mohamed Vadhel El Khalifa Heiba Ould Bekar; 7. Oumoul Mouminine Mouhameden Amar; 8. Khadjetou Abdallahi Ahmed; 9. Minetou Mohameden Amar; 10. Ahmed Kory Mohamed Lemine Sidi Yaaraf; 11. Bouh Hmeymid Hbeyeb; 12. Ahmed El Houbab Abderrahmane; 13. Bacar Mohamed Vall; 14. Itawal Amrou Brahim Devnaj; 15. Mohamed Vadel Demba Abeid El Barka; 16. Ne Tidjani Ne; 17. Fatimetou Zahra Isselmou Ibrahime; 18. Khedaja Bouh H'Meimid; 19. Haine M'Bareck M'Heimid; 20. Sidi Mohamed Cheikh Abdi Cheikh; Substitutes: 1. El Khalifa Sidi El Moctar Amar Alemine; 2. Yahya Mohamed Lemine Mohamedha
8	National Democratic Alliance (AND): 1. Ahmedou Bemba Mohamed Abdellahi Ahmed El Mokhtar; 2. Maimouna Mohamed Abdellahi Cheikh Mohamedou; 3. Zeinebou Abdellahi Ahmed Soultane; 4. Kemal Mohamed El Moustapha Ely Taleb; 5. Sedigh Abderrahmane Abderrahmane; 6. Sena Mohamed Laghlal; 7. Leila Khaled Zeid Messoud; 8. Marouf Abdel Kader Diop; 9. Chighaly Chighaly Chighaly; 10. Sendaye Bilal M'Bareck; 11. M'Barcka Essrine Bilal; 12. Khaled Zakaria Sy; 13. Abdellahi Mohamed Lemine Boukry; 14. Oum El Khair Khalemou Mohamed Lemin; 15. Mariem Mohamedou Haidara; 16. Mohamed Abdallahi Cheddad Eydji; 17. Abdellahi Salem Mohamed El Abd; 18. Azza Sidi Mohamed Cheikh El Alem; 19. Zahra Mohamed Yahya Emmin; Substitutes: 1. Jeyede Ane Ahmed; 2. Nouh Mohamed Lemine M'Bareck
9	National Rally for Reform and Development (Tewassoul): 1. Ahmedou Mohamed Mahfoudh M'Balla; 2. Seddave Sidi Brahim Adda; 3. Mounina Mohameden Soueilem; 4. Oumekelthoum Sid'Elemine Bebeni; 5. Abdarrahmane Fodié Marega; 6. Tekeyber Sidi Babya; 7. Chrive Ahmed Mohamed Yille; 8. Toutou Bah Hamed; 9. Mohamed El Moctar Mohamed El Moustapha Bouh; 10. Zeinebou Mohamed Cheikh; 11. Mohamed Brahim Hamed; 12. Zeynata Abdellahi Awbal; 13. Babe Ahmedou Ahmed; 14. Salma Ahmed Salimou; 15. Moctar Abderrahime H'Meidy; 16. Fatimetou Inalla Bilal; 17. Mohamed Abdellahi Mohamed Mahmoud H'baly; 18. Astou Abd El Kerim Wade; 19. Mohamed Mahmoud Lemrabott Ebou; 20. Zahra Ahmed Waled; Substitutes: 1. Mohamed Ahmedou Checha; 2. Aminetou Mohamed El Baghwy
10	Union for Planning and Building (UPC) (Note: The State of Justice Coalition is running through the Union for Planning and Building party.): 1. Zeinebou Mohmed Mahmoud Taghi; 2. Ahmedou Mostapha Abdellahi; 3. Messoude Mohamed Salem Demba; 4. El Moctar Ahmed Eka; 5. Mohamed Ahmed Dermaze; 6. Hayatty Mohamed El Moustapha Sidi; 7. Mohamed Demba Sow; 8. Nessiba Mohamed El Hafedh Maouloud; 9. Ebeyah Ahmed Zeidane Ahmed Zeidane; 10. Mariem Mohamed El Havedh Biye; 11. Mohamed Mahmoud Taleb Abeid; 12. Senghaniya Ely Said; 13. Djimbara Ramdane M'Beirick; 14. Imane Isselmou Deimany; 15. Eide El Mana Cheikh Mohamed Taghiou Allah; 16. Soultana Mohamed Mahmoud Maouloud; 17. Sidi Mohamed Taleb Mohamed El Moctar; 18. Tbeira Mohamed El Hafedh Biya; 19. Mohamed Ainina Mohamed Abeidi; 20. Oumekelthoume Boubacar Darra; Substitutes: 1. Ahmed Yeloul Khlifa; 2. Aminetou El Hoissein Bilal
11	Party of the Mauritanian Masses (PMM): 1. El Khalil Mohamedou Ennahoui; 2. Aminetou Mohamed Abba; 3. Mohamed Aly Mohamed Babe Ebou El Maali; 4. Fatimetou Mohamed Abdellahi El Khalifa; 5. Boubacar Yatma M'Barek; 6. Mahfoudha Sidi Ely Taleb; 7. Elbou Dah Mousbah Dine; 8. Rabia Yesslem Bah; 9. Mohamed Didi Abderrezagh; 10. Chemma Bembi Chedad; 11. Ahmed El Moustapha Ahmed Mohamed; 12. Zeinebou Amadou Niang; 13. Barou Demba Ba; 14. Magatte Lamine M'Baye; 15. Mohamed Yeslem Ahmedou Moussa; 16. Vatimetou Moulaye Abdy Sambe; 17. Mamady El Hacen Dia; 18. Mariem Djibi Sow; 19. Ibrahima Mamadou; 20. Aminata Alpha Diallo; Substitutes: 1. Ouman Alassan; 2. Zahra Ibrahim Saw
12	Republican Front for Unity and Democracy (FRUD) (Note: The Hope Mauritania coalition is running through the Republican Front for Unity and Democracy party.): 1. El Id Mohameden M'Bareck; 2. Coumba Dada Ousmane Kane; 3. Esma Abderrahmane Khouna; 4. El Mokhtar Ely Meissarata; 5. Ousmane Abderrahmane Lo; 6. Mohamed Saleck Brahim; 7. Maryama Bilal Bilal; 8. Khady Yehdhih Hamadiya; 9. Bah Mbareck R'Chid; 10. El Hadj Malick Boubou Niane; 11. Yassmine Sidi Mohamed M'Bareck; 12. Amainata Bouki Gueye; 13. Ahmedou Ebhoum Yesar; 14. Ahmed Mohamed Abdarrahmane Ehbib; 15. Mariem Almamy M'Ailime; 16. Teslem El Maouloud Yassar; 17. Aliou Yero Ba; 18. Mamma Ahmed Jedla; 19. Ismail Mohamed Mohamed El Khadjil; 20. Zeynna Sid'Ahmed M'Bareck; Substitutes: 1. El Hacen Hamada Askairy; 2. Abdoulaye Seiga Bâ
13	Centre through Action for Progress (CAP): 1. Mohamed Mahmoud Oumar Zaid; 2. Ahmed Abdel Kader Ahmed Bakar; 3. Fatou Mamadou Kane; 4. Raghiya Ahmed Mohamed; 5. Amadou Hreitine Sow; 6. Taghi Mohamed Ahmedatt; 7. Aichetou Fodié Tandia; 8. Salma Ahmedou Mohamedhen Meyloud; 9. Abou Amadou Ba; 10. Vadhila Idoumou Ely Salem; 11. Oum Kelthoum El Hadramy Tedjih; 12. El Hassen Ahmed Vall Amar Ould Sidi; 13. Oumou Alseyni Touré; 14. Fal Nour Din Oumar Zaid; 15. Aminetou Baba Hamar Vall; 16. Ahmedou Mohamedou Abdallahi Zerghani; 17. Khadijetou El Moctar Sy; 18. Maata Mbareck Maouloud; 19. Aminetou Isselmou Sid Oumou; Substitutes: 1. M'Bareck Vall Salem Hassene; 2. Asiye Sidi Ethmane Moulaye Abdarahmane
14	Rally of Democratic Forces (RFD): 1. Abderrahmane Sidina Mini; 2. Sidi Mohamed Mohamed El Kory El Kori; 3. Khadijetou Sidatti Chevagha; 4. Mariem Nevissa Mohameden Ahmedou Vall; 5. Vall Abderrahmane Mohamed; 6. Aminetou Abd El Ghader Abeid; 7. Aly Oumar Ahmed; 8. Zeinebou Alioune Ahmed; 9. El Housseine Ahmed Mohamed El Hecen; 10. Aminetou Ahmedoubamba Z'Eighem; 11. Hamza Yacoub Ahmed; 12. Khadijetou Sidi Ahmed; 13. Ely Ahmed Boilil; 14. Mariem Sid' Elemine Sid' Elemine; 15. Daouda Oumar Ahmed; 16. Fatimetou Rajel Sidi Elemine; 17. Aly Mohamed El Khanveri; 18. Fatimetou Mohamed N'Beiga; 19. Ahmed Chawghi Sidi El Mokhtar Mini; 20. Fenana M'Bareck M'Bareck; Substitutes: 1. Oumar Adberrahmane Hemed; 2. Yacoub Mohamed Lemine Samba
15	Nida El Watan: 1. Daoud Abdallahi Ahmed Aicha; 2. Make Isselmou Dendeni; 3. Lekweidem Ahmed Toueilib; 4. Aminetou Taleb Moustaph Mohamed; 5. Hammoud Sidi Mohmed Sidinne; 6. Deda Ahmed Zeidane; 7. Fatimetou Ahmedou Brahim El Kory; 8. Oum El Mouminine Beddah El Guewar; 9. Isselmou Mohamed Habib Allah Ammar; 10. Sidna El Moctar Feil; 11. Aissata Amadou Thiam; 12. Fatimetou Larabass Mekioune; 13. Mohamed Cheine Ethmane Ethmane; 14. Ghary Issa Cheiguer; 15. El Ghaitha Ahmed Zein Dine; 16. Khadijetou Yacoub El Mostapha; 17. Mohamed Sidi Sidi Brahim; 18. Hamoud Sidi Mohamed Hawatt; 19. Loum Ahmedou El Mokhtar; 20. Nevissa Saad Bouh Ahmed Salm; Substitutes: 1. Limame Rida Sidi Limame; 2. Had M'Hady Ahmed Laabeid
16	Burst of Youth for the Nation (PSJN): 1. Mounir Sid' Ahmed Ahmed El Hadi; 2. Bouye Ahmed Mohamed Demane; 3. Zeye Amar Noueiss; 4. Saima Brahime Bilal; 5. Amadou Samba Barry; 6. Mohamadou Demba N'Diaye; 7. Lalla Moulay Ismail Moulaye Ismail; 8. Zeinebou Cheikh El Moctar; 9. Mohamed Alioune N'Theim; 10. Aboubekrine Ahmed Mahmoud; 11. Ezi Mohamed El Mamoune Abdellahi; 12. Aminetou Soueilik Abeid El Barka; 13. Mohamed El Maaloum Jaavar Jaavar; 14. Abass Moulay Ismail Moulaye Ismail; 15. Salma Bouh Blal; 16. Aichetou Aly Samba; 17. Jegueine Mohamed Sidi; 18. Lehbib M'Bareck M' Bareck; 19. Aichetou Abou Konté; 20. Khira Lemrabott El Eyil; Substitutes: 1. Malainine Nemine Abeidi; 2. Adjem Abou Konté
17	Alliance for Justice and Democracy/Movement for Renewal (AJD/MR) (Note: The Coalition Living Together-Coalition Living Together/Truth and Reconciliation is running through the Alliance for Justice and Democracy/Movement for Renewal party.): 1. Ibrahima Moctar Sarr; 2. Moussa Mamadou Diallo; 3. Khadijetou Ibrahima Ba; 4. Binta Ibrahima Wane; 5. Issagha Bocar Diallo; 6. Abou Alassane M'Bodj; 7. Aissata Abdoulaye N'diye; 8. Djeinaba Mourtada Tall; 9. Bocar Kalido Lam; 10. Abdoul Mamadou Sy; 11. Salamata Ba Alassane Ba; 12. Mariam Boubou N'Dongo; 13. Mamoudou Abderrahmane Sy; 14. Alpha Oumar Sarr; 15. Aichetou Elhacene Sarr; 16. Diewba El Hadj N'diaye; 17. El Housseinou Abdoulaye Diop; 18. Ousmane Cheikh Diol; 19. Fatimata Khalidou Sarr; 20. Oumou Samba Diop; Substitutes: 1. Adama Amadou Tijane Sall; 2. Djeiny Ibrahima Niang
18	Party of Unity and Development (PUD): 1. Kleithima Nekhteirou El Fadel; 2. El Moctar Mohamed Abdellahi Mohamed; 3. Mariem Vall Cheikh Enami; 4. El Aliya Maouloud Ahmed; 5. Mohamed Salem Sidi El Bane; 6. Ibrahim Mohamed El Ghadhi; 7. Yemhelha Mohamed Abdel Jelil; 8. Mariem Taleb Maloum; 9. Hamdi Khlifa Bekri; 10. Sidi Mohamed Abdellahi Dhaakr; 11. Mana Ikhalihne Khliva; 12. Lemneya Maouloud Maouloud; 13. Mohamed Adda Mohamed; 14. Sidi Mohamed Gue Ahmed Ely; 15. Lalla Khouna Abd El Jelil; 16. Mariem Ahmedou Hadene; 17. El Hassen Babou Legneid; 18. Sidi Mohamed Mohamed Salem Aleya; 19. Lalle Mohamed Abd El Berka; 20. Mariem Mohamed Theiratt; Substitutes: 1. Bakari Mohamed Awerchane; 2. Khdeija Mohamed Abd El Berka
19	People's Progressive Alliance (APP): 1. Ahmed Abdellahi Abdou; 2. Peinda Ely Samba; 3. Abderrahmane Mahmoud Messoud; 4. Zekha Meissara M'Bareck; 5. Samba Aly Aly Sow; 6. Lalla Abdoul N'Diaye; 7. Mohamed Yahya Malainine Ahmed; 8. Aminetou El Khater Eman; 9. Mohamed Ahmed Mory; 10. Roughayetou Mechine Messoud; 11. Mohamed Aly Abderahmane Enahoui; 12. Fatimetou Messaoud Belkhair; 13. Cheye Ahmed Salem Eblal; 14. Vatimetou El Ghassim Moissa; 15. Sidi Abdella Saleck Mohamed; 16. Fatimatou Mouhmed Lchftt Leytug; 17. Ramdhane M'Beirik M'Beirik; 18. Lalla Vatimetou M'Barek M'Bareck; 19. Matalla Salem Salem; 20. Vatimetou Maouloud Baba Elhadj; Substitutes: 1. Youssouf Oumar Moctar; 2. Abdallahi Alioune Elmaloum
20	Sawab (Note: The Sawab–RAG Coalition is running through the Sawab party.): 1. Biram Dah Dah Abeid; 2. Yeslem Ely Abeily; 3. Zahra Mohamed M'Khaitratt; 4. Fatimata Amadou Bass; 5. Samba Aliou Diagana; 6. Moussa Hamet Soumaré; 7. Lemhasser El Housseine Jaber; 8. Oumou Farba N'Daw; 9. Souleimane Abass Moctar; 10. Amadou Kolly Traore; 11. Mariem El Mabrouk Rayess; 12. Salma Mbareck Salem Brahim; 13. Mohamed Alyoune Samba; 14. El Hadramy Mougna Deymani Bouhoubeiny; 15. Fatimetou Mohamed Babe; 16. Eneye Habib Zaid; 17. Yaly Abed Salam N'Diaye; 18. Ibrahima Seydi Ba; 19. Fatma Jemal Achour Salem; 20. Aiche Mohamed Yahya Mohamed El Barke; Substitutes: 1. Vetate Brahim Mohamed; 2. Sidaty Ahmed Taleb Saleck
21	Union of the Forces of Progress (UFP): 1. Gourmo Abdoul Elimane Lô; 2. Mohamed El Kebir Mohamed Abdellahi Seyid; 3. Zeinebou Taleb Abd Rahman; 4. Aichetou Hameth Fall; 5. Brahim Khattar M'Bedde; 6. Zeinabou Houdou Ba; 7. Rabya Tar Achour; 8. Habsa Gourmo Lô; 9. Mohamed Lemine Mohamed El Hanevi Etvagha Lemine; 10. Isselmou El Mamy Jidou; 11. Sidi Mohamed Mohamed M'bareck El Kory; 12. Ramata Mamadou Anne; 13. Niouma Ousmane Diagana; 14. Cheikh Amadou Gueye; 15. Cheikh Isselmou Emmed; 16. Fatimetou Brahim M'Bida; 17. Rabya Mohamed El Mokhtar Khoueilem; 18. Mariem Moussa Korera; 19. Hasmiyou Mamoudou Diop; 20. Mohamed Ahmed Babou Maham; Substitutes: 1. Mohamed El Moustapha Mohamed D'Ahid Hanafy; 2. Mohamed Lemine El Hadj Maleck
22	El Insaf: 1. Mohamed Bemba Meguett; 2. Siham Mohamed Yahya Najem; 3. Mohamed Lemine Hamoud Amar; 4. Mariem El Hacen Oumar; 5. Youssouf Tijani Sylla; 6. Hamadi Khatary Hamadi; 7. Mariem Oumar Abidine Sidi; 8. Aissata Alassane N'Gaédé; 9. Ely Salem Ely Mounah; 10. Dialla Biranté Sidibé; 11. Nejib Dah Ebhoum; 12. Binta Cheikh Dieye; 13. Cheikh Maata Owbej; 14. Mahfoudh El Bane Bowba Jedou; 15. Saviya Bemba Mohamady; 16. Hawa Yero Dia; 17. Ndahmoudi Khatari Abdellahi; 18. Eby Mohamed Aly Abeibeck; 19. Mana Sidi Sidi Boubacar; 20. Pinda Srine Saleck; Substitutes: 1. Brahim Chamekh Kheyna; 2. Chriv Ahmed Sidi Mohamed Moulaye Ahmed
23	El Vadila: 1. Ethmane Cheihkh Ahmed Eboul Mealy Cheikh Ahmed Eboul Mealy; 2. Khadijetou Mohamed Saghir H'Bibi; 3. Mohamed Cheikh Saad Bouh Cheikh Ahmed Ebou Elmaaly; 4. Hasina Sid'Ahmed El Varough; 5. Cheikh Saad Bouh Mohamed El Moustapha Cheikh Abderrahmane; 6. Toutou Mohameden Hemeinna; 7. Yacoub Habib Mailim; 8. Maimouna Ahmedou Hemeina; 9. El Mokhtar Mohamed Lemine Ebbe; 10. Khadijetou Ahmedou Hemeina; 11. Cheikh El Hadrami Mohamed El Moustapha Cheikh Abderrhamane; 12. Meimouna Mohameden Hemeinna; 13. Mohamed Fadel Dahi Dahi; 14. Aichetou Mohameden Al Mahbouby; 15. Sidi Ahmedou Bilal; 16. Oumel Vadly Mohameden Al Mahboub; 17. Ivoukou Taleb Khiyar Taleb Mohamed; 18. Mariem Dahy Dahi; 19. Mohamed El Moctar El Ithnayne Amar; 20. Oumoulhassen Lemrabott El Varough; Substitutes: 1. Idoumou Ramdane Faiy; 2. Ematy Ahmedou Hemeina
24	National Cohesion for Rights and the Construction of Generations (Ribat): 1. Saad Louleid Nave; 2. Fatma Mohamed Haidara Abeidy; 3. Mohamed Salem Mohamed Vadhel Elkhoumany; 4. Salka Mohamed Lemine Tekrour; 5. M'Niha Mohamed Salem Soulé; 6. Adama Sambouldou Kome; 7. Mahbouba Mohamed Sidi Nejib; 8. Ethmane Sidi Dewa; 9. Mariem Moussa N'Diaye; 10. Dahi Sidi Hemed Vall; 11. Deida Sidi Mohamed Abeidella; 12. Mohamed Lemine Mohamed Mahmoud Khatar; 13. Nejah Ahmed Baba Lemlih; 14. Limam Saleh Samba; 15. Tekeiber Dah Sabar; 16. Mohamed Abdellahi Youssouf; 17. El Khatter Mohamed Oubeid Meidou; 18. Mohamed Mahmoud Eje Moussa; 19. Koriya Meiloud Sambe; 20. Aicha Sidi M'Bareck Cheiguer; Substitutes: 1. Jibril Maeta Maeta; 2. Ahmed Baba Mohamed Abdallahi El Kharchi

Women's national list

#	List
1	Centre through Action for Progress (CAP): 1. Teslem Sedigh Fall; 2. Mariem Saleck Zaid; 3. Houleye Abou Diallo; 4. Haby Abdel Kerim M'Bodj; 5. Aichetou Mohamed Mahmoud; Substitutes
2	Mauritanian Party of Union and Change (HATEM): 1. Oumeya Said Abd El Ghader; 2. Hemi Taleb Aheimed; 3. Mahjoube Mohamed Vall Sidi Mohamed; 4. Zeinebou Mohamed Lemine El Ghasstalani; 5. Aichetou Yowba Toulba; 6. Mariem Mohamedhen Bayeni; 7. Nassra Sidi Abdella Sidi Mahmoud; 8. Aminetou Sidi Mohamed El Khalifa; 9. Mariem Mohamed Meouloud Abdouly; 10. Zeinebou Mohamed Mahmoud Loudaa; 11. Aichetou Said Abd Elghader; 12. Mekfoula Aly Hamoud; 13. Fatimetou Mohamed Moussa Louly; 14. Fatimetou Tar Khattra; 15. Aichetou Mohamed Marouki; 16. Kertoume Mohamed Lemine Abeidi; 17. Khadijetou S'Oueilim M'Kajar; 18. Mariem Mama Mohamedne Vall Ahmed Bibi; 19. Aminetou Said Abdel Kader; 20. Zeinebou Abdellahi Bouchame; Substitutes: 1. Isselemha Sidi Mohamed Sedigh
3	Party of Conciliation and Prosperity (HIWAR): 1. Vatimetou Ahmedou Mohamedou; 2. Mentata Abidine Zeine; 3. Aichetou Haroun Cheikh Sidiya; 4. Aissata Mamadou Ba; 5. Gualiya H'Babou Ahmed; 6. Aichetou Mohamed Jadiya; 7. Khadijetou Abdelaziz Cheikh Mohamed El Mami; 8. Varha Seidna Aly Miny; 9. Teslem Mohamed El Hadj Ahmed; 10. Enemme Mohamed Baba Mohamed Vall; 11. Nahe Deih El Abouni; 12. Hana Mohamed Lemine Mohamed Salem; Substitutes
4	Republican Party for Democracy and Renewal (PRDR): 1. Mintata Khlil Heddeid; 2. Fatma Mohamed Belkeir; 3. Mariem Mohamed Mohamed Vall; 4. Kemmala Cheikh Mohamed El Benya; 5. Zeinebou Ahmed Salem Elvadel; 6. Zemzem Sidi Dendeni; 7. Mouna Mohamed Mahmoud Mohamed Lemere; 8. Khadijetou Bamba Brahim; 9. Garmi Samba Soumaré; 10. Nene Oumar Merzoug; 11. Nouha Mohamed Ahmeida; 12. Ami Doudou Diop; 13. Wissal Deddahi Heyine; 14. Mariem Ahmed Houbed; 15. Khaitna Beyay El Moustapha; 16. Fatimetou Mohamed Mohamed Taleb; 17. Baba Cheikh El Maaloum; 18. Mouna Mohamed Mohamed Navva; 19. Khaita Bahah Guenvoud; 20. Khadijetou Mohamed Vall Elhaj; Substitutes: 1. Youma Cheikh Mohamed Mahmoud Elbenya; 2. Mariem Saadne Ahmed Bouna
5	El Karama: 1. Kertouma Mohamed El Moustapha Jaevar; 2. Fatimetou Naji Terekzi; 3. Dveila Mohamed Mahmoud Abacker; 4. Toutou Sidi Mohamed Mohamed Vall; 5. Mekfoule Mahfoudh Bneijara; 6. Zeinebou Mahfoudh Bneijara; 7. Zeinabou Mohamed Lemine T'Feil; 8. Idoumha Sidatt Sabar; 9. Hayaty Abderrahmane El Valy; 10. Zeinebou Aly T'Feil; 11. Mariem Itawel Oumrou Seghiri; 12. Merieme Mohamed El Moctar Cheikh; 13. Houleye Mata Bile Coulibaly; 14. Meimouna El Hacen Bari; 15. Zeinebou Hamahoullah Ahemdi; 16. Mariem Yarba Mohamed Sidi; 17. Tahra Mohamed Sidi Aly; 18. Roukheye Mohamed H'Meity; 19. Meija Oudat Allah Soueidi; 20. Zeinebou Mohamed El Moctar Cheikh; Substitutes: 1. Noura Mohamed Yahya Ahmed Jedou; 2. Fatimetou Mohamed Lemine Yacoub
6	El Islah: 1. Messouda Baham Mohamed Laghdaf; 2. Marieme Abdallahi Wane; 3. Remla Mohamed Al Vagha; 4. Sefira Mohamed Salem Mah; 5. Aichetou Kara N'Dari; 6. Fatimetou Amadou Diop; 7. Mariem Cheikhna Mohamed Laghdaf; 8. Mariem Mahjoub Idrissa; 9. Fatimetou Mohamed Abdellahi Aly; 10. Zeinebou Moussa Diallo; 11. Zeinebou Ethmane El Valy; 12. Nouha Isselmou Bleyil; 13. Lamity Mohamed Lemine Abeih; 14. Habsa Kassoum Bâ; 15. Oum Lekhoutt Mansour Bella; 16. Loubna Ahmed Yacoub Mohamed El Khader; 17. Deinaba Amadou N'Diaye; 18. Hawa Alioune Gaye; 19. Farmeta El Hassen Mahmoud; 20. Couro Abdoulaye Wane; Substitutes: 1. Aminetou El Hacen Seleyman; 2. Aichatou El Arby Boubacar Amou
7	El Ravah: 1. Yenna Ahmed Leih; 2. Mariem Mohameden Amar; 3. Aminetou Mohamed Dahi; 4. Vatma Dah Aghmoguit; 5. Takou Jeireb Beilil; 6. Salma Lemrabett Habiba; 7. Meime Ahmed Lah; 8. Meima Mohamed Cheikh Mohamed Cheikh; 9. Moymine Vetene Vetene; 10. Maimouna Mohamed Abdellahi Cherif; 11. Mouna Abderrahman Ouwahou; 12. Aichetou Mohamed Yeslem Elmoustapha; 13. Aichetou Oumar N'Guezou; 14. Jemila Cheikh Taleb Moustapha; 15. Mina Mohamed Horma; 16. Zeinebou Abderrahmane Tedih; 17. Vatimetou Ainina Sid Brahim; 18. Aichetou Sidi Rabanni; 19. Aminetou Ainina Sidi Brahim; 20. Behsene Taleb Boubacar Taleb Boubacar; Substitutes: 1. El Alya Dah Aghmoguit; 2. Mariem Oumar N'Guezou
8	National Democratic Alliance (AND): 1. Aminetou Sidi Mohmad Hamadi; 2. Lalla Fatma Ahmed Taher; 3. Niagna Guellaye Sow; 4. Roughaya Mohamed M'barck Beinni; 5. Vetya Sidi Mohamed Cheikh El Alem; 6. Lemina Sidi Mohamed Cheikh El Alem; 7. Aminetou Sidi Mohamed Cheikh El Alem; 8. Oumekelthoum Hadamine Abderahmane; 9. Emal Mohamed Mahmoud Tolba; 10. Mariem Mohamed Abderrahmane Moine; 11. Inejiha Isselem Khalou Mamady; 12. Garmi Aly Bra Ella; 13. Tama Ely Brahalla; 14. Aichetou Dah Sidi Mahmoud; 15. Hayaty Dah Sidi Mahmoud; 16. Salem Khawalha Saleme Ehel Salem; 17. Oum Vadli Dah Sidi Mahmoud; 18. Marieme Abdellahi Cheikh Ahmed; 19. Oum El Khairy Dah Sidi Mahmoud; 20. Leila M'Bareck Salem; Substitutes: 1. Zahra Mohamed Mahmoud Tolba; 2. Esma Mohamed Nah
9	Republican Front for Unity and Democracy (FRUD): 1. Kadiata Malick Diallo; 2. Mame El Bou Mohamed; 3. Soultana Mohamed Lemine Ejwad; 4. Djeinaba Amadou Diallo; 5. Aissata Mamadou Djigo; 6. Mettou Djibril Bâ; 7. Saedane Brahim Mohamed Lemine; 8. Aminetou Brahim Lein; 9. Fatimata Niang Niang; 10. Aichetou Niama Traoré; 11. Aminata Yéro Diallo; 12. Marieme Abdallahi Cheikh Ahmed; 13. Haby Mamadou Dia; 14. Fatimetou Mody Dabo; 15. Maimouna Mohamed Amar; 16. Aminata Pathe Bâ; 17. Mariam Ousmane Gueye; 18. Oumou Habi Cheikh Moktar; 19. Djeinaba Thierno Diaw; 20. Moliguel Sidi Diallo; Substitutes: 1. Bara Cheikh Malaïnine Taleb Nahwy; 2. Mariem Mahmoud Sile
10	National Rally for Reform and Development (Tewassoul): 1. Mounina Ahmed Salem J'Reivine; 2. Zehoura Cheikhna Beidiya; 3. Aminata Diadie Sakera; 4. Fatimetou Ahmedou El Hilal; 5. El Ghaida Eghweyli N'Beya; 6. Aiche El Hadj El Hassan El Hadj El Hassan; 7. El Aliya Sidi Mohamed Chemmad; 8. Ramatoulaye Amadou M'Baye; 9. Mana Sidi El Moctar Abdallahi; 10. M'Barcka Samba Mahmoud; 11. Toutou Sidi Mohamed Mohamed Rara; 12. Toubba Oumar Fall; 13. Toumana Deih Zein; 14. Boukah Matalla Imigine; 15. Aissata Ibrahima Kane; 16. Aminetou Mohamed Ech Fagha El Mokhtar; 17. Lalla Aicha Mohamed Ahmed Lab; 18. Fatimetou Mohamed Yeslem Lemsaydef; 19. Lehbibe Ahmedou Eleitt; 20. Raya El Alem El Atigh; Substitutes: 1. Haja Mouhamed Malainine El Moussaid; 2. El Megboula Dah Jeddou
11	Union for Planning and Building (UPC): 1. L'Malouma Bilal Said; 2. Fatimetou Mohamed Yahya M'Boirik; 3. Mariem Ba Alassane Ba; 4. Yehjeb Bouha Melainine Mohamed Ghoulam; 5. Mariem Brahim Sow; 6. Haja Aboubecrine Messoud; 7. Zeinebou Mohamed Maatalla; 8. Oumoul El Mouminine El Moctar Foundiougma; 9. Hasniya Mohamed Ghanem; 10. Aminata Harouna Kane; 11. Temlass El Ghassem Aleyatt; 12. Aminetou Babe Maouloud; 13. Mariem Mohamed Yahye Mboirick; 14. Aminetou Mohamed Vall Bey; 15. Mariem Bocary Massa; 16. Aziza Yarba Salem; 17. Salma Mahmoud M'Bareck; 18. Kama Hamdane Beye; 19. Fatimetou Matalla M'Bareck; 20. Deya Mohamed Abdellahi Meissa; Substitutes: 1. Zeinebou Abdellahi Taleb Mohamed; 2. Assiyatou Ely Mohamed Salem; 3. Aminetou Bilal M'Bareck
12	Rally of Democratic Forces (RFD): 1. Mariem Brahim Samba Fall; 2. Djeinaba Yero Gueye; 3. Henaa Ahmed Haimoudan; 4. Mintata Abdellahi Diakhaté; 5. Mariem Ahmedou Hourmatallah; 6. Aminata Abdoul Gueladio Ba; 7. Selma H'Bella G'Feife; 8. Amal Ely S'Neibe; 9. Bilé Younouss Wague; 10. Mariem Mohamed Abdallahi Khlakhel; 11. Fatimetou Brahim Samba Fall; 12. Fatimetou Brahim Balla; 13. Ramata Abdoulaye Sy; 14. Oum El Vadli M'Baye Fall M'Baye Fall; 15. Hawa Dembe Ba; 16. Roughaya Khalidou N'Diaye; 17. Naha El Hassen Touré; 18. Hadia Koura Mamadou Dia; 19. Roughayetou Abdellahi Diarra; 20. Nine Mohameden Baba Sneiba; Substitutes: 1. Salma Thiery Silla; 2. Jamila Bougalett Cherif Sow
13	Nida El Watan: 1. Khaire Sidaty El Wedani; 2. Kaya Brahim Seweidi; 3. Fatimetou Sidaty Guewar; 4. Fatimetou Zahra Tengue Sidi; 5. El Vaiza Mohamed Ahmed Dem; 6. Mariem Samba Bah; 7. Mariem Larabass Mekioune; 8. El Khatre Slake Cheikh Mohamed; 9. Aicha Beddah Guewar; 10. Siham Mohamed Soueidatt; 11. Aichetou Ebah Hemdeit; 12. Mahjouba Mohamed Abdel Jelil; 13. Mariem Mohamed Lemine Sidi Heiba; 14. Lakouar Mohamed Ely Bouba; 15. Nahe Sid' Ahmed T'Feil; 16. Aichana Sid Ahmed Ahmed Zerough; 17. Haibetna Larabass Mekiyoune; 18. Mah Alioune Mohamed Lamar; 19. Vatimetou Mohamed Ely Bowba; 20. Selekha Mohamed Lemine Ivekou; Substitutes: 1. Mriem Abdallahi Ahmed Aicha; 2. Mene Brahim Cheiguer
14	Union of the Forces of Progress (UFP): 1. Kadiatou Gama Sow; 2. Nana Sidi Mohamed Namou; 3. Aminetou Abdoul Djoune; 4. Aichetou Saleck Barhoum; 5. Mariem Aboubekry Sow; 6. Aichetou Mohamed M'Bareck; 7. Minetou Boubecrane Mohamed Lemine; 8. Aicheta Mamadou Sow; 9. Fatimata Harouna Ba; 10. Sira Samba Sow; 11. Meimoune Mamadou Sow; 12. Aminetou El Hassan Dia; 13. Goundo Lassana Diallo; 14. Aissata Alassan Sow; 15. Cheya Moussa Couloubaly; 16. Maimoune Mohamed Oumarou; 17. Zeinebou Amadou Doumbia; 18. Haby Youssef Seck; 19. Salamata Mamadou Sow; 20. Ramla Sidi Ibrahima Beina; Substitutes: 1. Aichetou Samba Soumaré; 2. Aminetou Demba Mohamed
15	Burst of Youth for the Nation (PSJN): 1. Lalla Cherif Hachem; 2. Oum Elid Said Bouye; 3. Khadijetou Souleymane Mariko; 4. Marieme Hamady Sow; 5. Salma Cheikhna Eziad; 6. Vatma Lavrack Ramdhane; 7. Meleywiha Malick Telmoudy; 8. Aminata Mohamed Abdellahi Taourass; 9. Meija Ahmed Ghaber; 10. Siham Dah Kebadi; 11. Oum El Kheiry El Bechir El Abghary; 12. Lalla Sidi El Bechir; 13. Meimouna Cheikh Mohamed Fadel; 14. Zeinabou Soueilik Ahmed; 15. Fatimetou El Koury Messoud; 16. Aichettou Ngaru Daoud; 17. N'Deye Malado Toumany Sow; 18. Vatimetou El Moctar Gh'Weily; 19. Oum El Vadli Mohamed Soueileck; 20. Zeinebou Mohamed Salem Mohamed; Substitutes: 1. Lalle Aiche Rabah Rabbou Cheikh Ahmedna; 2. Bowba Taleb Ayach
16	Party of Construction and Progress (PCP): 1. L'Wene Ebabe El Ghoth; 2. Aminetou Mohamed El Moctar Yehdhih; 3. El Moumne Alioune Ahmed Ebeye; 4. Tekber Cheikh El Jeilany Elid; 5. Astou Mohamed Teicoura; 6. Oumoulkheiry Ahmed Blal; 7. Fatma Benani Abdellahi; 8. Waranka Boulaye Soumare; 9. Hindou Boilil Ely; 10. Nate Aly Aliyoune; 11. Dora El Moktar Minane; 12. Leila Oumar Ehmeide; 13. Mahjouba Brahim Feina; 14. Loueina Mohamed Messoud; 15. Chreiva Massire Boti; 16. Yaghouta Youba Sebari; 17. Fatimetou Mohamed Lemine Abderrahmane; 18. Beiche Mohamed El Hacen El Hacene; 19. Dadde Brahim Bilal; Substitutes: 1. Aichetou Mohamed Moussa; 2. Feile Saleh Abeid
17	Alliance for Justice and Democracy/Movement for Renewal (AJD/MR): 1. Saoudatou Mamadou Wane; 2. Raky Ousmane Camara; 3. Fatimata Harouna Aw; 4. Mariem Mamadou Dia; 5. Oumou El Vadly Ibrahima Diop; 6. Oumou Kelthoume Ousmane Diol; 7. Dioulde Nabel Mamadou Dia; 8. Tabe Mady Sarr; 9. Fatimata Amadou El Hadj Ly; 10. Fatimata Aboubacry Dia; 11. Hawa Khalidou Diallo; 12. Khady Abderrahime Dia; 13. Rouguiyatou Abderrahime Dia; 14. Hawa Djibril N'Gaide; 15. Salamata Moustapha Haidara; 16. Peinda Ali Niang; 17. Kadiata Boubakar Kanté; 18. Mariata Abderrahime Dia; 19. Binta Ousmane Watt; 20. Houleye Mohamedou Kane; Substitutes: 1. Fatimata Amadou Diop; 2. Bilel Mamadou Ba
18	People's Progressive Alliance (APP): 1. Lehdiya Louleide Nave; 2. Mariem Messaoud Boulkhair; 3. Vatma Sidi Mohamed K'Leib; 4. Mata Bocary Massa; 5. Mariam Mamadou Diagne; 6. Dadde El Moustapha Belkhair; 7. Diary Harouna Ba; 8. Aminetou Abdellahi Eblale; 9. Zeinebou Ibrahima N'Diaye; 10. Nouha Mahmoud Messoud; 11. Vatimetou El Moctar Amar; 12. Meimouna Mohamed Samba; 13. Minetou Mamadou Sidibé; 14. Aichetou Rabah El Man; 15. Zeinebou Sidi Mohamed Sid El Moktar; 16. Achetou M'haimid Eleya; 17. Adama Nouh Oumar; 18. Youma El Hacène Abd Oumou; 19. Oum Kelthoum M'Hady M'Hady; 20. Yehjebouha El Ghotob Elemine; Substitutes: 1. Bakar Mohamed Meissara; 2. Hendou Baba Mody
19	Party of Unity and Development (PUD): 1. Zeinebou Abd El Kader Camra; 2. Khadi Mohamed Yahya Meynouh; 3. Yakheir Babbah Ahmed Taleb; 4. Vatimetou Bouh Ahmed Sidi; 5. Mint Assass Sid'Ahmed Mewloud; 6. Djeinaba Ismaila Kane; 7. Mariem Brahim Lehbib; 8. Fatma Bouh Hamadi; 9. Mana Gaye Sangaré; 10. Soultane Mohamed Vall Mohamed Lahmed; 11. Fatimetou Cheikh Yargueina; 12. Zeinebou Idoumou Krbaly; 13. Mariem Mohamed Vall Rahel; 14. Aminetou Cheikh Saad Bouh Abdel Kader; 15. Meije Mohamed Brahim Mohamed Brahim; 16. Lalle Eby Ahmed Mohamed; 17. S'Laka Jeddou Ahmed Labeid; 18. Mariem Daouda Thiam; 19. Djeinaba Moussa Diallo; 20. Hindou Mohamed Khalid Eby; Substitutes: 1. Aminetou Mohamed Vall M'hamed Lahmed; 2. Fatimetou Ely Aleg
20	Sawab: 1. Mariem Cheikh Samba Dieng; 2. Haby Rabah Ahmed; 3. Salka Ahmed Merhbe Teinech; 4. Aissata Yahya Samba Niass; 5. Mariem Mohamed M'boukhoukha; 6. Khadijetou Boubekrine Meileck; 7. Ahmed Khouna Chamekh M'Khaittir; 8. Boye Saidou Sagna; 9. Fatimetou Mohamed M'Bareck; 10. Lalla El Kory Messoud; 11. Kenno Djiby Faye; 12. M'Beiricka Bilal Brahim; 13. Fatimetou Ahmed Edadah; 14. Khadijetou Mohamed Foud; 15. Oum Selemete Dah Beilil; 16. Aminetou Chedad Yali; 17. Kouke Yahya M'Bareck; 18. Khadijetou Moulaye Ely Kerba; 19. Komba Alioun Ndaw; 20. Tekeiber El Id Hmeimed; Substitutes: 1. Raghya Abdellahi Mamourou; 2. Mariem Ahmed Hmeida
21	Party of the Mauritanian Masses (PMM): 1. Salma Bouh Bouhe; 2. Amal Louleid Wedad; 3. Khdeijatt Abdallahi Mohamed; 4. Mariem Mahfoudh Aba; 5. Oumel Khairy El Arbi Didy; 6. El Havdha Sidi Ahmed Sidi Brahim; 7. Lemina Saad Bouh Habibou Rahmane; 8. Idoumha Mahfoudh Ely Ould Ewbeck; 9. Enetou Gueouad Demene; 10. Fatimetou Mahfoudh Ely Ould Ewbek; 11. Mariem Cheikh Saleck Lehbib; 12. Aïche Mohemd Ezein Moulay; 13. Chiminy Cheikh Saleck Lehbib; 14. Jemila Yehifdhou Sidi Brahim; 15. Yemhalhe Cheikh Saleck Lehbib; 16. Emeime Demba Elbou; 17. Zeinebou Mohamed Bouya Ahmed; 18. Aichetou Mohamed Vall Ebcar; 19. Tahya Jeddou El Hadramy; 20. Fatimetou Ahmed El Abass; Substitutes: 1. Binta Djibi Ba; 2. Khadijetou Hamy Sy
22	El Insaf: 1. Fatimetou Khlivit Amour Habib; 2. Saadani Mohamed Khaitour; 3. Djeinaba Abdoul Samba Korka; 4. Fatimetou Mohamed Abdellahi El Hacen; 5. Mamah Mahfoudh Lemrabott; 6. Salma Ramadhane Amar Cheine; 7. Loula Ahmed Zarough; 8. Melika Mohamed Chenane; 9. Oum Gouffa Aminech Soueileh; 10. Fatimetou Mohamed Mahmoud Aghrabatt; 11. Fatimata Demba Tandia; 12. Oumamete Weyade Macire; 13. Khadijetou Mohamed Lemine Ba; 14. Hawa Baba Ndiaye; 15. Leila Mohamed Deide; 16. N'Deye Fatma Mbaye Sarr; 17. Mounina Mohamed Saleck Chenedra; 18. Raghiyetou Cherif Abd El Kader Cherif Mohamed Vadel; 19. Haja Mohamed Mahmoud El Boukhary; 20. Aminetou Saghiry Embarek; Substitutes: 1. Salka Ahmed Jiddou Ammy; 2. Oumoulmouminine Memed Mohamed Brahim
23	El Vadila: 1. Mouna Sid'Ahmed Sebty; 2. Fatou Abderrahmane Soueid Ahmed; 3. Zeinebou Abdellahi Fall; 4. Halimetou Oussmane Ndoy; 5. Vaiza Elban Cheikh Ahmed; 6. N'Dey Mohamed Saleck Moussa; 7. Mame Baba Cheikh Sidiya; 8. Mariem Chighaly Mohamed; 9. Aichetou Sidi Mohamed Sidi Amar; 10. Khadijetou Sidi Ali Cherif; 11. Nefissa Mohamed Lemine Babou; 12. Oumou Kelthoum Mamady Abeidy; 13. lalla Mohamed Senhoury; 14. Meimouna Lemrabott El Varough; 15. Teye Varejou Dadi; 16. Khadjetou Sidi Mohamed Sid'Amar; 17. Aminetou Mohamed Mseidef; 18. Mouna Sidi Mohamed Didi; 19. Mariem Moustapha Sidi Aly; 20. Mariem Mohamed Lemine Babou; Substitutes: 1. Aicha Yessar Selamne; 2. Nema Demba Hamady
24	National Cohesion for Rights and the Construction of Generations (Ribat): 1. Fatma Abdel Aziz Aleya; 2. Lalla Oum El Khayri El Hadj Boubouth; 3. Salimata Yero Malal Sarr; 4. Mena Sidi M'Bareck Cheiguer; 5. Aichete Mohamed M'Bareck; 6. Ekhdeyja Abderrahmane Cheikh; 7. Fatme El Ghalya Abdellahi Ahmed Saleck; 8. Khadijetou Boukhreiss Benawf; 9. Ebba Ahmed Louli Bobbat; 10. Khadijetou Cheikhattou Moustaph; 11. Mariam Samba Sy; 12. Seoudiya Sidi Beidaly; 13. Deida Mohamed Aly Saleh; 14. Wehba Brahim Yedhatt; 15. Toutou El Khadhra Thierne; 16. Fatou Souleye Diouma Diallo; 17. Aminetou Bedy Beilil; 18. Oum El Vadly Lek'Heil Bilal; 19. Jabha Ella Saleh Bilal; 20. Youma Aliune Mohamed; Substitutes: 1. Aichetou Bedy Mohamed El Atigh; 2. Khadijetou Bellah Dahane

Youth national list

#	List
1	Centre through Action for Progress (CAP) Substitutes: 1. Meimouna Brahim Mohamed Saad; 2. Alioune Sidi Boubacar; 3. Mahmoud Lalla Ramdhan M'beirick; 4. Vatimetou Aboubacar Jiddou; 5. El Housseine El Moctar Brahim; 6. Khadijetou Samba Welé; 7. Fatimetou Ahmed Jeddou Beih; 8. Mahjouba Oumar Salem Aaleya; 9. Teslem Mahmoud M'bareck; 10. Ahmed Mohamed M'Hamdi; 11. Biye Biye Khatry
2	Mauritanian Party of Union and Change (HATEM): 1. Mohamed Yahya Elmoustapha; 2. Emina Mohamed Yeslim Jied; 3. Youba Hamahou Allah Jidou; 4. Mint Montally Brahim Brahim; 5. Mohamed Vall Dah Salem; 6. Aïchetou Ahmed Mohamed Salem; 7. Mohamed Salem Boubacar; 8. Taiba Yahya El Moustapha; 9. Mohamed Aly Dje Abeidi; 10. Khadijetou Ahmed Mohamed Salm; 11. Mohamed Salem Yahya El Moustapha; Substitutes: 1. Youba Hamahou Allah Jidou; 2. Mohamed Aly Dje Abeidi; 3. Taiba Yahya El Moustapha; 4. Aïchetou Ahmed Mohamed Salem; 5. Khadijetou Ahmed Mohamed Salm; 6. Emina Mohamed Yeslim Jied; 7. Mohamed Salem Yahya El Moustapha; 8. Mohamed Salem Boubacar; 9. Mohamed Yahya Elmoustapha; 10. Mint Montally Brahim Brahim
3	Republican Party for Democracy and Renewal (PRDR): 1. Aminetou El Mousselem Cherif; 2. Abderrahmane Oumar Diop; 3. Khadijetou Baoube Mohamed Naffe; 4. Mohamed Lemine Mohamed Mahmoud Mohamed Lamar; 5. Leille Lekbeid Ahmed Zeidane; 6. Mohamed Vadel Aly Sidi; 7. Ghoueiya Mohamed Yahya El Moustaph Mhamed; 8. Mohamed Vall Mohamed Mahmoud Mohamed Abba; 9. Mounina Saedna Hedeid; 10. Mohamed Yahya Mohamed El Mostafa Maham; 11. Deida Mohamed Abdel Jelil; Substitutes: 1. Ethmane Salem Mohamed Mahmoud; 2. Ismaile Abderrahmane Mohamedou
4	National Rally for Reform and Development (Tewassoul): 1. El Mourtadha Essalem T'Feil; 2. Zeinebou Sidi Soumaré; 3. Mouhamed Ghaly Moulaye Othmane Moulaye Ahmed; 4. Oum El Vadli Mohamed Abderrahmane Sidi Brahim; 5. El Moctar El Id M'Bareck; 6. Zeinebou Moustapha Hachimi; 7. Tafssirou Mamoudou Kane; 8. Hindou Mohamed Lemine Maham; 9. Sidi Ahmedou Sidi Oumou; 10. Aichetou El Hadramy Saad; 11. Mohamedhen Maouloud Hamar Vall; Substitutes: 1. Elhassene Mohamed El Housseine; 2. Oumkoulthoum Mohamed Salem Illa
5	Party of Conciliation and Prosperity (HIWAR): 1. Cheikh Moulaye Sidi Ely Taleb; 2. Eslaka Mohamed Vall Abd El Jelil; 3. Mariem Hamed Ebatt; 4. Sidi M'Hamed Bia Mourba; 5. Zeine Abidine Zeine; 6. Melicke Mohamed Meissa; 7. Youssouf Mohamed Jadiya; 8. Khadijetou Salima Abdel Aziz; 9. Nevissa Moulaye Sidi Ely Taleb; 10. Oumou El Khairy Magatt Aly; 11. Ejewda H'Bibi Sid El Moctar; 12. Mohamed Tiyeb Cheikh Mohamed Lemine Mohamed Lemin; Substitutes: 1. Mariem Ahmedou El Hadj Amar; 2. Sidi M'Hamed Bia Mourba
6	Union for Planning and Building (UPC): 1. Mohamed Lemine Mohamed El Agheb Salem; 2. Yacoub Ahmed Lemrabet; 3. Mohamed Mohamed Ali E'Hmein Saleme; 4. Sid Elmokhtar Mohamedou Weiss; 5. Mama Abdallahi Deihi; 6. M'Ghallouha Ahmed Vall Erebi; 7. Lemrabott Mohamed Salem Hamadi; 8. Fatimetou El Maouloud Houeiballa; 9. Fatimetou Ahmed Chaabane Habib; 10. Cheïkhna Sid Brahim Sidi Mouloud; Substitutes: 1. Mohamed El Moctar Abdi; 2. Soumeye Ismail Mohamed
7	El Islah: 1. Mohamed Sid'El Moctar Oumar; 2. El Nama Mohamed Sihla; 3. Ahmed Salem Mohamed Abdellahi Mohamed Jules; 4. Salma El Hadramy Ducros; 5. Ahmed Bezeid Ismail Seyidoun; 6. Noura Mohamedou Mohamed Laghdhaf; 7. Saleck Baba Salek Sidi Mohamed; 8. Selma Adama Maata Moulana; 9. Mohamed Sadegh El Mehdi El Kaber El Aghel; 10. Zeinebou Cheikh Oumar Sow; 11. Hamade Alioun Ouerzeg; Substitutes: 1. Khadijetou Mohamed Sabar; 2. Meimouna El Hacen Beyah
8	National Democratic Alliance (AND): 1. Sid' Ahmed Ahmed Megaya; 2. Moussa Sidi Mohamed Abderezagh; 3. Mouna Moulaye Zeine Chighaly Sidi; 4. Aichetou Mohamed El Moustapha El Gharachi; 5. Cheikh Saidbouh Essalem Abdi; 6. Oumou El Benine Soueidy M'haimid; 7. Behaida Mohamed M'Heimid; 8. Ghalia Abdellahi Sidaty; 9. Djibril Mohamed El Hady Amar; 10. Aminetou Cheikh Ahmed Cheikh El Moustaphe; 11. Abdellahi Mamadou Sy; Substitutes: 1. Makelthoum Cheikh Ahmed Cheikh El Mostaph; 2. Mohamed Mahmoud Ahmed Maouloud
9	Republican Front for Unity and Democracy (FRUD): 1. Khally Mamadou Diallo; 2. Mohamed Vall El Housseine El Mane; 3. M' Bala Sidi Mohamed Ahmedou; 4. Aminata Oumar Diallo; 5. Boubecar Djiby Sow; 6. Mohamed Vall Mohameden Aghvalite; 7. Teslem El Kory Mamadou; 8. Bouyaye Mohamed Najem Ahmad Sidi; 9. Aly Housseinou Dianka; 10. Enissa Mohamed Mohamed El Idy; 11. Cheikh Mohamed Laghdaf Mohamed El Hassen El Hadj El Kouri; Substitutes: 1. Mohamed Nedhirou Abderrahmane Wade; 2. M'Barka Salem Yessar
10	Rally of Democratic Forces (RFD): 1. Mohameden Mohamed Boussaty; 2. Saleck Mohamed Saleck; 3. El Banque Memhoul Bawaba; 4. Meimouna Moussa Diallo; 5. Moulaye Abdallah Moulay El Hacen Moulay Idriss; 6. Rachad Ahmedou Soueidi; 7. Nessime Ahmed Ramdhane; 8. Mariem Moulaye Idriss M'baka; 9. Brahim Meissare Mohmed El Eidi; 10. Ely Abdoullah Ely Taleb; 11. Saleck Ahmedou El Khattat; Substitutes: 1. Abderrahmane Ahmedou Aly; 2. Brakhoum Mohamed Boussaty
11	Union of the Forces of Progress (UFP): 1. Saleck Abdel Aziz Demba; 2. Amadou Ousmane Thiam; 3. Chegra Mohamed Yeslem Bedda; 4. Fama Boubacar Konté; 5. Mohmed Lekhlive Lehbeibe; 6. Sidi Mahmoud Elweyene Elweyene; 7. Koriya Mohamed Mohamed; 8. Hawa Mamadou Dieng; 9. Moussa Dawa El Mestehdi; 10. Aichetou Tijani Demba; 11. Yacoub Waled Beibiutt; Substitutes: 1. Aissata Mamadou Diop; 2. Mohamed Vall Bechir Mohamed Ahmed
12	Nida El Watan: 1. Cheikh Mahfoudh Neame Cheikh Tourad; 2. El Hacen Mahmedou Eybe; 3. Yassine Sidi El Hady; 4. Mohamed Yahya Mohamed Elbou El Boukhary; 5. Toutou Mohamed Mokhtar Ahmed Maouloud; 6. Aminetou Sidatna Brahim Dkhane; 7. Mohmed Lemin Fall Fall; 8. Minetou Neame Cheikh Tourad; 9. Zeinebou Ely Hamadi; 10. Tourad Mohamed Brahim Cheikh Tourade; 11. Sidi Mohamedou Beki; Substitutes: 1. Mohamed Yehdhih El Houceine Mohamed Yehdhih; 2. Mohamed Vadil El Mahmoud El Morad
13	Burst of Youth for the Nation (PSJN): 1. Lemine Ahmed Ghaber; 2. El Hadramy Rabah Rabbou Cheikh Ahmedna; 3. Bowba Baba Boye Abd; 4. Nana Moulaye Ismail Moulaye El Hassan; 5. Gaye M'Bare Traore; 6. Salka Issa Fall; 7. Alioune Sidi Mohamed Mohamed Khouna; 8. Elfater Samba Ahmeide; 9. Hapsa Cherif Amar; 10. Dah Mohamed Mohamed Abdellahi; 11. Fatimetou Sidi Elhar; Substitutes: 1. Sleimane Abdoulay Birom; 2. Aicha Ambouha Baba
14	El Karama: 1. Mohamed Sid'Ahmed Dade; 2. Aïssata Mamadou Diallo; 3. Isselmou Mohamed Seyidi; 4. Deydiha Elhadramy Mama; 5. Mohamed Lemine Oumar Abeibacar; 6. Salma El Mamy Foulan; 7. Youba Saleck Fall Dahi; 8. El Maouloud Bilal Maatalla; 9. Mama Brahim Yarguett; 10. Jili Mahfoudh Abe; 11. Ibrahim Galadio Kassé; Substitutes: 1. Mama Mohamed Maouloud; 2. Cheick Sidi Mohamed Ahmed Mohamed Beiba
15	Party of Unity and Development (PUD): 1. Mohamed Abdel Jelil Yahya Cheikh El Ghadi; 2. Aby Mahfoudh Cheikh Sidi Mohamed; 3. Mohamedou Chamy Khouye; 4. Teslem Mohamed El Moktare Hamedi; 5. Daouda Youssouf Gadio; 6. Zeinebou Brahim Ahmedou; 7. Mohamed Salem Hamidoun Abdelghader; 8. Aichetou El Housseine Ahmed; 9. Mohamed Bouye Abdoullah Soufi; 10. Fatimetou Mohamed Abdy; 11. Hamady Mohamed M'Kheitir; Substitutes: 1. Mohamed El Haj N'Daha; 2. El Housseine Mohamed El Moctar Aliyene
16	Party of Construction and Progress (PCP): 1. Aya Mohamed Moussa; 2. Mohamed Vall Ahmed Salem Eblal; 3. Aichetou Mohamed Lemin Amar Jeddou; 4. Essalek Sidi Mohamed Edlle; 5. Mariem Alpha Samba Sy; 6. Salla Alioune Ahmed Abey; 7. Vatimetou Cheikh El Jeilany El Idd; 8. Mohamed Aheimed Mohamed M'a Rock; 9. Khadijetou M'Baye Habib Seck; 10. Mama Sidi Aly Ahmed Taleb; 11. El Aliya Mohamed M'Bareck; Substitutes: 1. Sidna Izid Bih El Mebrouck; 2. Teslem M'Boirick Soueilick
17	Party of the Mauritanian Masses (PMM): 1. Mohamed Mahmoud Mini El Bechir; 2. Sidi M'Hamed Abdellahi Ijiwen; 3. Nejatt Mohamedou Mah; 4. Molo Djibi Sow; 5. Fatimetou Belkher Achour; 6. Mohamed El Moctra Mohamed Mohamed Lemine; 7. Fatimetou Lemrabett Mohamed Lemine; 8. Oumelvadli Yahye Mohamed Mahmoud; 9. Hawa Cheikhna Bechiri; 10. Mohamed Lemine El Ghassem Mohamed Abdellahi; 11. Mahjoube Werzeg Werzeg; Substitutes: 1. Mohamed Mohamed El Mehdy Maham; 2. Mohamed Mahmoud Ikabrou Sidi
18	Alliance for Justice and Democracy/Movement for Renewal (AJD/MR): 1. Salif Souleymane Dia; 2. Aissata Saidou Sy; 3. Abdellahi Oumar Ba; 4. Salamata N'Deiné Bah; 5. Mohamed El Moctar Abdarrahmane Sy; 6. Diewo Mamadou Sy; 7. Oumar Abou Aw; 8. Binta Sada Dicko; 9. Ibrahima Boubou Welé; 10. Aissata Sally Ba; 11. Amadou Demba Gueye; Substitutes: 1. Adama Moussa Dia; 2. Bintou Alassane Wone
19	Sawab: 1. Aminetou El Hacen Boughel; 2. Oumou El Moumine Semette Ebyaye; 3. Mohamed Sidi Salem Samba; 4. Hamady Thiambel Ba; 5. Fatouma Amara Diallo; 6. Hama Abdoulaye Niang; 7. Aminata Cheikhna Diagana; 8. Sidi Ahmed Brahim Souleymane; 9. Aiche Mohamed Yarkouh; 10. Mohamed Diadié Gassama; 11. Weny Ishagh El Moctar; Substitutes: 1. Salo Mohameden Dieye; 2. El Mokhtar Habib Abeid
20	People's Progressive Alliance (APP): 1. Ahmed Salem Youba Kouya Sidi Abdallah; 2. Mint Neby Mohamed Val Mohamady; 3. Sidi Mahadi Ely; 4. Diariata Samba Aly Sow; 5. Bah Abdatt Boilil; 6. Aichetou Naji Isselmou; 7. Hamza Djebril Bouh; 8. Issmail Mohamed Lemine El Mokhtar; 9. Khdeija Guewat Voulane; 10. Khadjetou Mahmoud Lallah Chadad; 11. Mariem Abdel Ghader Selmane; Substitutes: 1. El Mokhtar El Hacen Bowba; 2. Ramata Cheikh Rassoul
21	El Ravah: 1. Abdrehmane Sidi Mohamed El Idi; 2. Ahmed Mohamed Noueih; 3. Fatimatou Zahra Khatary Abdy; 4. Memme Ahmed Ahmed El Henoune; 5. Sid'Ahmed Haye Dadde; 6. Chrive Ahmed Saadna; 7. Toutou Ahmedou Sidi Ould Limam; 8. Aichetou Moustapha Moulaye El Abass; 9. Dah Mohamed Yacoub; 10. Hamoud Mohamed Abdi; 11. Aichetou Ahmed Bouhoumadi; Substitutes: 1. Brahim Elheynane Meyzizi; 2. Mohamed Nebil Ahmed Moustapha
22	El Insaf: 1. Khadijetou Abdoulaye Wane; 2. Cheikh Sidi Khattry Mohamed Jiddou; 3. Mohamed Vih El Barka Bah; 4. Jemile Mohamedou Nehah; 5. Ahmed Bezeid Ahmed Salem El Hacen; 6. Mariem Bah El Mebrouck; 7. Limam Chavi El Khalil Teyib; 8. Fatimetou Sid' Ahmed El Moctar Salem; 9. Mamadou Babacar Diagne; 10. Fatimetou Hamady Amar; 11. Matalla Hamady Coulibaly; Substitutes: 1. Fatimetou Mohamed Bacha Bache; 2. Mohameden Sidi El-Emana
23	El Vadila: 1. Ahmed Lemrabott Cheikh Mahmoud; 2. Vatme M'Baye Fall Meiloud; 3. Cheikhna Brahim Abdellahi; 4. Akhyarahoum Sidi Mohamed Sidi Horma; 5. Aboubacar Tafssirou Moustapha Diallo; 6. Aminetou Cheikh Saad Bouh Cheikh El Hadramy; 7. Alassane Abdoul Sangott; 8. Aminata El Hacen Sow; 9. Mohamed Hachim Malik Diallo; 10. Dioulde Bocar Keita; 11. Havssa Cheikh Ahmed Abi El Maali; Substitutes: 1. Mohamed Mohamed Vall Vall; 2. Assiytou Cheibany Sidatt
24	National Cohesion for Rights and the Construction of Generations (Ribat): 1. Hamza Aly Boïtigh; 2. Ali Ebeye Mohamed M'Bareck; 3. Sogho Halima Sogho; 4. Tahra Abderrahmane Abd Daim; 5. Saidou Alassane Sogho; 6. Oumou El Kheiry Mohamed Ahmed Elghady; 7. Meimouna El Jeilany Mohamed M'Bareck; 8. Mohamed Mahmoud Nehah Mouadh; 9. Abdoulaye Ifa Sy; 10. Maouloud Moctat Brahim; 11. Halime Isselmou Mahmoud; Substitutes: 1. Mohamed Salem Ely Maatala; 2. Aminetou M'Barik M'Bareck

== Departamental districts ==

- List of candidates in the electoral districts in Adrar
- List of candidates in the electoral districts in Assaba
- List of candidates in the electoral districts in Brakna
- List of candidates in the electoral districts in Dakhlet Nouadhibou
- List of candidates in the electoral districts in Gorgol
- List of candidates in the electoral districts in Guidimaka
- List of candidates in the electoral districts in Hodh Ech Chargui
- List of candidates in the electoral districts in Hodh El Gharbi
- List of candidates in the electoral districts in Inchiri
- List of candidates in the electoral districts in Nouakchott
- List of candidates in the electoral districts in Tagant
- List of candidates in the electoral districts in Tiris Zemmour
- List of candidates in the electoral districts in Trarza

== Diaspora ==
No candidacies were listed on the National Independent Election Commission's website as per 15 April 2023.
