= List of candidates in the 2023 Mauritanian parliamentary election in Inchiri =

Candidates in the upcoming Mauritanian parliamentary election

This is the list of candidates for the 2023 Mauritanian parliamentary election, in the electoral districts of the wilaya of Inchiri. 25 parties were legally registered by the National Independent Election Commission and thus allowed to run in the election, with some coalitions running under the lists of a party.

The provisional lists were published by the National Independent Election Commission on a website on 12 April 2023, as the deadline expired on 13 April 2023.

== Akjoujt ==
#	List
1	Union of the Forces of Progress and Alliance for Justice and Democracy/Movement for Renewal (UFP–AJD/MR) (Note: The Coalition Living Together-Coalition Living Together/Truth and Reconciliation is running through the Alliance for Justice and Democracy/Movement for Renewal party.): 1. Vetiya Sid' Ahmed Samba; Substitutes: 1. Aboubacri Ousmane Diallo
2	Sawab (Note: The Sawab–RAG Coalition is running through the Sawab party.): 1. Abdallahi Sid'Ahmed Yargue; Substitutes: 1. Fatma Alioun El Bembary
3	El Insaf: 1. Sid' Ahmed Mohamed El Hassen Doueiry; Substitutes: 1. Sidi Ahmed Bettar
4	El Islah: 1. Sid'Ahmed Abderrahmane Mohamed M'Bareck; Substitutes: 1. Ahmed Mohamed Dibaj
5	National Cohesion for Rights and the Construction of Generations (Ribat): 1. Mohamed El Jewde Hawatt; Substitutes: 1. Mohamed Mohamed Mahmoud Tleimidi

== Bénichab ==
#	List
1	Sawab: 1. Bounene Sidi Zeini; Substitutes: 1. Mohamed Sidi Lebchir
2	National Cohesion for Rights and the Construction of Generations (Ribat): 1. Ahmedou Ahmed Yacoub Chach; Substitutes: 1. El Haje Mohamed Jeireb
3	Rally of Democratic Forces (RFD): 1. Meilemnine Abdel Ghoudouss Ismail; Substitutes: 1. Mohamed Mohamed Mahmoud Amah
4	El Insaf: 1. Ali Sidi Mohamed Dewla; Substitutes: 1. Bouhoubeiny Abdallahi Lekbad
