= List of candidates in the 2023 Mauritanian parliamentary election in Tiris Zemmour =

Candidates in the upcoming Mauritanian parliamentary election

This is the list of candidates for the 2023 Mauritanian parliamentary election, in the electoral districts of the wilaya of Tiris Zemmour. 25 parties were legally registered by the National Independent Election Commission and thus allowed to run in the election, with some coalitions running under the lists of a party.

The provisional lists were published by the National Independent Election Commission on a website on 12 April 2023, as the deadline expired on 13 April 2023.

== Bir Moghrein ==
#	List
1	El Insaf: 1. Takioullah Eidda Eidda; Substitutes: 1. Limame Cheikh Nour Din
2	El Islah: 1. Mohamed Salem Ahmed Ahmed Noueygued; Substitutes: 1. Ahmed Salem Lahssen Jaaer
3	Sawab (Note: The Sawab–RAG Coalition is running through the Sawab party.): 1. Yacoub Oumar Ahmed; Substitutes: 1. Seyid Zehaff Mbareck

== F'Déirick ==
#	List
1	El Insaf: 1. Khaddad Lemrabott Moctar; Substitutes: 1. Cheikh Saad Bouh Mohamed El Moustapha Boyah
2	El Ravah: 1. Dieh Taleb Ahmed Mohamed Ghoulam; Substitutes: 1. Aliene Sall Dioulde

== Zouérate ==
#	List
1	El Insaf: 1. Hamoud Ely El Malha; 2. Idoumou Mohamed Haky; Substitutes: 1. Sidiya Mohamed Saad Bouh Adda; 2. Sidi Messoud Diahloul
2	Sawab and National Rally for Reform and Development (Sawab–Tewassoul): 1. Yaghoub Abdi Sabar; 2. Ahmed Vall Mohamed Abdallahi Mohamed Salem; Substitutes: 1. Aminetou Ahmed Mohmed Lembareck; 2. Sidi Saleck Beilile
3	El Islah: 1. Mohamed Abdellahi Mohamed Lemine El Mane; 2. H'Metou Sidi El Haimer; Substitutes: 1. Mohamed Ahmed S'Ghaier; 2. Ahmed Salem Cheibany Saleck
4	People's Progressive Alliance and Republican Front for Unity and Democracy (Note: The Hope Mauritania coalition is running through the Republican Front for Unity and Democracy party.) (APP–FRUD): 1. El Mahmoud Mohamed Deydi; 2. Hamady Abdoul Hamady Bah; Substitutes: 1. Bahah Mohamed El Abd M'Bareck; 2. Mariam El Ghassoum Ball
5	Union of the Forces of Progress and Alliance for Justice and Democracy/Movement for Renewal (UFP–AJD/MR) (Note: The Coalition Living Together-Coalition Living Together/Truth and Reconciliation is running through the Alliance for Justice and Democracy/Movement for Renewal party.): 1. Moussa Ibrahima Gallédou; 2. Djibril Aboubacry Dia; Substitutes: 1. Moussa Mamadou Sow; 2. Tacko Ousmane M'Boudj
6	National Democratic Alliance (AND): 1. Mohamed Abdallahi Mohamed Diallo; 2. Vatma Maata Messoud; Substitutes: 1. El Mehdi El Moubarack M'Bareck; 2. Mohamed El Kory Ghoulam Amar
7	Union for Democracy and Progress (UDP): 1. Mohamed Abdatt Bilal; 2. El Hafedh Brahime Soule; Substitutes: 1. Maouloud Hamady Sow; 2. Ahmed Sidi Boussbeia
8	National Cohesion for Rights and the Construction of Generations (Ribat): 1. Cheikh Sid' Ahmed M'Haimdatt; 2. Mohamed Saleck Bilal; Substitutes: 1. T'Varah Bouye Ayed; 2. Ataf Abderrahmane N'Dour
