= List of candidates in the 2023 Mauritanian parliamentary election in Assaba =

Candidates in the upcoming Mauritanian parliamentary election

This is the list of candidates for the 2023 Mauritanian parliamentary election, in the electoral districts of the wilaya of Assaba. 25 parties were legally registered by the National Independent Election Commission and thus allowed to run in the election, with some coalitions running under the lists of a party.

The provisional lists were published by the National Independent Election Commission on a website on 12 April 2023, as the deadline expired on 13 April 2023.

== Barkéol ==
#	List
1	Alliance for Justice and Democracy/Movement for Renewal (AJD/MR) (Note: The Coalition Living Together-Coalition Living Together/Truth and Reconciliation is running through the Alliance for Justice and Democracy/Movement for Renewal party.): 1. Amadou Tijani Samba Ali Tiam; 2. Ahmed Moctar Lamin N'Diaye; Substitutes: 1. Maïram Ibrahima N'Diaye; 2. Aissata Djiby N'Diaye
2	Union of the Forces of Progress (UFP): 1. Bouyagui Mohamed Taleb; 2. Aly Alpha Sow; Substitutes: 1. Yemma Saleck Ebeyd; 2. Daouda El Hacène Ba
3	El Insaf: 1. Moussa El Bechir Mohamed El Mehdy; 2. Mohamedou Boukhreysse Abdallahi; Substitutes: 1. Mohamed El Agheb Mossa Mahmoud; 2. Itawal Oumerou Massiré Sid'Elmokhtar
4	National Rally for Reform and Development (Tewassoul): 1. El Ghasseme Hasni Maham Bowba; 2. Mohamed Abdellahi Djibril Khatry; Substitutes: 1. Yahia El Mamy El Hour; 2. Abded'Eddayeme Salem L' Mewloud

== Boumdeid ==
#	List
1	El Insaf: 1. Mohamed Lemine Mohamed Abdellahi El Ghazwany; Substitutes: 1. Sid'Ahmed Cheikh Mohamed Ahmed Cheikh El Ghazwany
2	National Rally for Reform and Development (Tewassoul): 1. Mohamed Sid'Ahmed Mohamed Lemine Cheikhna; Substitutes: 1. Mohamed Lemine Taleb Memine
3	Sawab (Note: The Sawab–RAG Coalition is running through the Sawab party.): 1. Mohamed El Mehdi Mohamed Kaber Salihi; Substitutes: 1. Cheikh Taly M'Haimed
4	Republican Front for Unity and Democracy (FRUD) (Note: The Hope Mauritania coalition is running through the Republican Front for Unity and Democracy party.): 1. Mohamed Lemine Mohamed Mahmoud El Hady; Substitutes: 1. Mohamed Lghdaf Hadamine Khyar
5	National Cohesion for Rights and the Construction of Generations (Ribat): 1. El Ghassem Mohamed Mahmoud Dit Isselmou Aboud Aboude; Substitutes: 1. Zeineb Mohamed Ahmedou

== Guerou ==
#	List
1	El Insaf: 1. Mohamed Lemine Elalem Sidi; 2. Sidi Mohamed Mohamed Sidi Ould Habib; Substitutes: 1. Mohamed El Hassen Sidi Mohamed Mody; 2. Mohamed Mahmoud Sidi Elmine Maazouz
2	National Rally for Reform and Development and El Vadila (Tewassoul–El Vadila): 1. El Moukhtar Mohamed Limam; 2. El Ghassem Mohamed Ahmed Taleb Ebeidy; Substitutes: 1. Mohamed Yeslem Sidi Sidi Aly; 2. Mohamed Abdellahi Sidi Mohamed Eli
3	National Cohesion for Rights and the Construction of Generations (Ribat): 1. Mohamed El Moustapha Mohamed Hawyi; 2. Mohamed Yahya Sidi Mohamed; Substitutes: 1. Abderrahmane Mohamed Ahmed Hawwy; 2. Khairatt Abd Rahman Sidi Mohamed
4	Sawab: 1. Mahmoud Lillah Abdarrahmane Bilal; 2. Cheikh Mohamed Lemine Avgueiriche; Substitutes: 1. Khadgetou Yeslem M'Heimid; 2. Hayati Saleck Sleimane

== Kankossa ==
#	List
1	Sawab: 1. Saleck Jaavar M'Haimid; 2. Boubacar Saleck M' Haimid; Substitutes: 1. Said Oumar Samba; 2. Kertouma Mohamed Lemin Bekary
2	National Democratic Alliance (AND): 1. El Houssein Isselmou Mahmoud; 2. Souley Samba Ba; Substitutes: 1. Eddahah Taleb Ahmed Embeirik; 2. Demba Samba Sané
4	People's Progressive Alliance (APP): 1. Aly Mohamed Lo; 2. Emeite Mohamedou Rabi; Substitutes: 1. Mohamed Najem Ahmed Salem Eblal; 2. Halali El Moustapha Siyat
6	National Rally for Reform and Development (Tewassoul): 1. Ahmed Salem Mohamed Mahmoud Emhaymdat; 2. Ahmed Elkhalil Zerough; Substitutes: 1. Elmaloum Mohamed Mahmoud Elmaloum; 2. Elhoussene Mohamed Lemine Taleb Amar

== Kiffa ==
#	List
1	Mauritanian Party of Union and Change (HATEM): 1. Mohamed Mahmoud Sid'El Mokhtar Mohamed; 2. Oum Kelthoum Sidi Batt Mohamed Abderrahmane; 3. Mhadi Ahmoudy Ahaimed; Substitutes: 1. Brahim Sidi Senab; 2. Varha Sidi Mohamed Mohamed Mahmoud
2	Sawab and Republican Front for Unity and Democracy (Sawab–FRUD): 1. Nahah Ahmedou El Moustapha; 2. El Veche Deidy Sylla; 3. Kertome Bilal; Substitutes: 1. Sambe Waly Manke; 2. Sadvi Sidi Zeghar
3	El Islah: 1. Mohamed Abderrahmane Mohamed Abdellahi Edy; 2. Beiba Abeid El Barka Sleyman; 3. Khour Khatry Vadoua; Substitutes: 1. Ahmed Mohamed Mohamed El Hadj; 2. Aminetou Vali Ahmed Maloum
4	National Rally for Reform and Development (Tewassoul): 1. Mohamed Abdellahi Isselmou Taher; 2. Aminetou Mohamed Lemine Sidna; 3. Mohamed Ahmed Mohamed Mahmoud Dehane; Substitutes: 1. Mohamed Mahmoud Mohamed Abderrahmane El Bekay; 2. Mohamed Moulaye Ahmed Sidi El Mokhtar
5	Party of Conciliation and Prosperity (HIWAR): 1. Mohamed Mahmoud Cheikh El Ghouth; 2. Thewra Moustapha Sidatt; 3. Sidina Mohamed Lehbib Sid Brahim; Substitutes: 1. Alioun Brahim Sweilem; 2. Abdou Mohamed Salem M'Bareck
6	Union for Planning and Building (UPC) (Note: The State of Justice Coalition is running through the Union for Planning and Building party.): 1. El Veta Mohamed Mahmoud Babah; 2. Fatimettou Cheikh Ahmed Lemine Ebeye; 3. Rabah Blal Blal; Substitutes: 1. Vatimetou Abdallahi Bah; 2. Jemila Ebba Hassne El Moujteba
7	Nida El Watan: 1. Lemrabott Mohamed Mohamed; 2. Lemeyma Cheikh Kbeit Oumou; 3. Anabou Soueileck Soueileck; Substitutes: 1. Sidi Mohamed Mohamed Hama; 2. Manna Mohamed Saad Balla
8	Union of the Forces of Progress (UFP): 1. Mohamed Nouh Mouloud; 2. Aminata Moussa Sow; 3. Soumeye Ahmed Abde Eleyet; Substitutes: 1. El Moustapha M'Heimid Eblal; 2. Moustapha Saleck Salem Abeid
9	Alliance for Justice and Democracy/Movement for Renewal (AJD/MR): 1. Coumba Adama Sow; 2. Boubacar Houssein Diawara; 3. Dienaba Samba Tall; Substitutes: 1. Mohamed Mohamedou Ba; 2. Ngadou Arafan Saidou
10	El Insaf: 1. Khattry Cheikh Mahmoud; 2. El Kahla Sidi Agjeyel; 3. Moustapha Dedda Hamadi; Substitutes: 1. Abdelahi Mohamed Sidi Mahmoud; 2. Toumena Mohamed Breye
11	National Cohesion for Rights and the Construction of Generations (Ribat): 1. Fah Sadvi Hama; 2. Zahra El Houssein El Houssein; 3. Elhousein Sidi Mohamed Elhaje; Substitutes: 1. Lemat Yahya; 2. Limam Mohamed Lemine Ebeyé
12	People's Progressive Alliance (APP): 1. Mohamed Sidi Mahmoud Ahmed; 2. Aminetou Ahmed Hamedatt; 3. Mohamed Abdi Hneid; Substitutes: 1. Khadeije El Her Soueilik; 2. Mohamed Abdellahi Demba Bâ
13	Rally of Democratic Forces (RFD): 1. Ahmed Isselemou Dewla; 2. Vatimetou Naji Aheimed; 3. Cheikh Bekaye Khattary; Substitutes: 1. Baba Sidi Mohamed Soueidi; 2. El Hacen Mohamed Eminou
