= List of candidates in the 2023 Mauritanian parliamentary election in Tagant =

Candidates in the upcoming Mauritanian parliamentary election

This is the list of candidates for the 2023 Mauritanian parliamentary election, in the electoral districts of the wilaya of Tagant. 25 parties were legally registered by the National Independent Election Commission and thus allowed to run in the election, with some coalitions running under the lists of a party.

The provisional lists were published by the National Independent Election Commission on a website on 12 April 2023, as the deadline expired on 13 April 2023.

== Moudjéria ==
#	List
1	Sawab (Note: The Sawab–RAG Coalition is running through the Sawab party.) and National Rally for Reform and Development (Sawab–Tewassoul): 1. Aali Omar Khavnash; 2. Hammoud Kaber M'Bareck; Substitutes: 1. Mohamad Lemine Ali Amijen; 2. Meimoun Ahmed Meimoun
2	National Cohesion for Rights and the Construction of Generations (Ribat): 1. Sidi Bilal Sidi; 2. Mohamed Vall Mohamed Ahmed; Substitutes: 1. Sid'Ahmed Ahmed L'ouj; 2. Sid'Ahmed Hamadi Sid M'Bareck
3	El Ravah: 1. Yaacoub Ahmed Mohamed S'Ghair; 2. Mohamed El Houcein Abderrahmane Bakkar; Substitutes: 1. Sid'Ahmed Mohamed Mohamed Seyyid; 2. Mahfoudh Mohamed Lemine Brahim
4	El Islah: 1. Sidi Mohamed Rabi El Wavy; 2. Jemal Mohamed Zeidane; Substitutes: 1. Baba M'Hamed Sghair; 2. Lehraitany Messoud Soueidy
5	El Insaf: 1. Oumoukelthoum El Yassa El Yassa Soueid Ahmed; 2. Elyakher Yesslem Sidi El Moctar; Substitutes: 1. Soueid Ahmed Ahmed Hemed; 2. Bekaye Ahmed El Liwad

== Tichitt ==
#	List
1	El Insaf: 1. Bouya Ahmed Chrif Chrif El Mokhtar; Substitutes: 1. Ahmed Cherifae El Mokhtar Had
2	El Islah: 1. Cheikhna Amar Abdella; Substitutes: 1. Jedou Mohamed Magha

== Tidjikja ==
#	List
1	El Insaf: 1. Moustapha Sidi Hamoud; 2. Ghleywa Eman Lahdhana; Substitutes: 1. Mendah Bellahi Mendah; 2. Mohamed Mahmoud Abderrahmane Mohamed Ahmed
2	People's Progressive Alliance (APP): 1. Maham Ahmed M'Barck; 2. N'Guiya Ahmed Meissa; Substitutes: 1. Ahmed Moustapha Ahmeid; 2. Aichetou Ebeyik Ramdane
3	Union for Democracy and Progress (UDP): 1. Sidi Abdoullah Sidi Mohamed Leeziz; 2. Ahmed Mohamed Abd Rahman Amar Abdi; Substitutes: 1. Roughaya Eslama Mohamed M'Bareck; 2. Abderrahmane Mohamed Magha
4	National Rally for Reform and Development (Tewassoul): 1. Mohamed Lemine Mohamed Abd Rahmane El Maaloum; 2. Abderrahmane Mohamed Cheikh; Substitutes: 1. Ahmed Salimou Abderrahmane; 2. Mohamed Ahid Mohamed Nouh Mohamed Ahid
5	El Islah: 1. Mohamed Moustapha El Hafedh; 2. Mohamed Lemine Mohamed Mahmoud Ahmed Lembareck; Substitutes: 1. Senad Mohamed Ramdhane; 2. Mohamed Bouya Ahmed El Bachir
