= List of candidates in the 2023 Mauritanian parliamentary election in Adrar =

Candidates in the upcoming Mauritanian parliamentary election

This is the list of candidates for the 2023 Mauritanian parliamentary election, in the electoral districts of the wilaya of Adrar. 25 parties were legally registered by the National Independent Election Commission and thus allowed to run in the election, with some coalitions running under the lists of a party.

The provisional lists were published by the National Independent Election Commission on a website on 12 April 2023, as the deadline expired on 13 April 2023.

== Aoujeft ==
#	List
1	Union of the Forces of Progress (UFP): 1. Yahya Hamdinou El Keihel; Substitutes: 1. Ahmed Othmane Massa
2	El Karama and El Islah: 1. Ely Sid'Ahmed Betar; Substitutes: 1. El Ghassem Essuni Abdi
3	People's Progressive Alliance (APP): 1. Ennanna Slame Maham; Substitutes: 1. Slama Abeidy Mohamed M'Barek
4	National Rally for Reform and Development (Tewassoul): 1. Isselkou Ahmed Henoune; Substitutes: 1. Laghdhave Lemrabett Samba
5	El Insaf: 1. Mohamed Abdellahi Ely Telmoudy; Substitutes: 1. Mohamed Lemine Mohamed Mahmoud Ahmed
6	Union for Democracy and Progress (UDP): 1. Mohamd' El Mokhtar El Hadrami Eddehah; Substitutes: 1. Mohamed Mahmoud Ahmedou El Hady
7	National Cohesion for Rights and the Construction of Generations (Ribat): 1. Ahmedou Abdallahi Nouemane; Substitutes: 1. M'Haimidy Cheibany Mohamed M'Bareck

== Atar ==
#	List
1	El Insaf: 1. El Houssein Mahfoudh Bouboutt; 2. Ahmed Louleid Abdalla; Substitutes: 1. Mariem Moma Cheikh Mohamed Vadel; 2. Aya Ely Nene
2	El Islah: 1. Ahmed Sidi Ahmed Maouloud; 2. Mohamed Mahmoud Brahim Khyar; Substitutes: 1. Mohamed Salem Mohamed Hadi; 2. Mohamed Bouya Abdellahi Beidje
3	National Democratic Alliance (AND): 1. Abdel Azize Ahmed Abeidna; 2. El Hadramy Mohamed Salem Ahmed; Substitutes: 1. Rabia Mohamed Salem Ahmed Laama; 2. Zeinebou Mohamed Ebeilil
4	People's Progressive Alliance (APP): 1. Nagi Bah Jidou; 2. Sidi Ahmed Lekhal; Substitutes: 1. Aminetou Boujemaa Ebhayliss; 2. Minetou Ely Mahmoud
5	Sawab (Note: The Sawab–RAG Coalition is running through the Sawab party.): 1. Mohamed Yehdih Mohamed Salem Maetala; 2. Fatimetou Lemrabot Cheikh Abde Rahmen; Substitutes: 1. Abdellahi Isselmou M'Heimar; 2. Bah Cheikh Mohamed Lemine
6	National Cohesion for Rights and the Construction of Generations (Ribat): 1. Dih Louleid Boulkheir; 2. Mohamed Lehbib Maouloud Maouloud; Substitutes: 1. Jaavar Sid'Elemine Mohamedhen Habiboullah; 2. Douha Mahmoud M'Bareck
7	National Rally for Reform and Development (Tewassoul): 1. Dedahi Mohamed Boih; 2. Mekfoula Abdel Wedoud Khlifa; Substitutes: 1. Mohamed Mahmoud Mohamed Lemine El Abd; 2. Sidi Khalihenne Ahmedou

== Chinguetti ==
#	List
1	El Insaf: 1. El Bou Hamdy Abdarrahmane; Substitutes: 1. Mohamed Sidi Bigue
2	El Karama: 1. Mohamed Said Cheikh Sid'Ahmed Ahmed El Bechir; Substitutes: 1. Moulaye Didi Meissa
3	El Ravah: 1. Ahmed Amou El Arbi El Arby; Substitutes: 1. El Arby Abdi Jedeine
4	Sawab: 1. Ahmed Lemrabott Abeih; Substitutes: 1. Ebabeckrin Mohamed Salek Varajou

== Ouadane ==
#	List
1	El Insaf: 1. Ahmed Mohamed Saleck Sleimane; Substitutes: 1. Mohamed Lemine Mohamed Ali El Hadj
2	El Islah: 1. Abdou Louleid Wadad; Substitutes: 1. Mohamed El Mehdy Moulaye Zeine Moulay El Boukhary
3	People's Progressive Alliance (APP): 1. Salka Bilall Enza; Substitutes: 1. Mowloud El Id M'Barek
4	National Cohesion for Rights and the Construction of Generations (Ribat): 1. Mohamed Mohamed Salem Dowle; Substitutes: 1. Ahmed Leabeid Maatalla Maatalla
