= List of candidates in the 2023 Mauritanian parliamentary election in Dakhlet Nouadhibou =

This is the list of candidates for the 2023 Mauritanian parliamentary election, in the electoral districts of the wilaya of Dakhlet Nouadhibou. 25 parties were legally registered by the National Independent Election Commission and thus allowed to run in the election, with some coalitions running under the lists of a party.

The provisional lists were published by the National Independent Election Commission on a website on 12 April 2023, as the deadline expired on 13 April 2023.

== Chami ==
#	List
1	El Insaf: 1. Lemrabott Houmeya Tanji; Substitutes: 1. Khadijetou Baba Ely Mohamed
2	National Rally for Reform and Development (Tewassoul): 1. Bamba El Moctarr Egbe; Substitutes: 1. Sidi Mohamed Abdelahi Beyate
3	Republican Party for Democracy and Renewal (PRDR): 1. Ahmed Brahim El Moktar Fall; Substitutes: 1. Mohameden Lemrabat Ahmed Salem
4	Sawab (Note: The Sawab–RAG Coalition is running through the Sawab party.): 1. Zaid El Mouslimine Malainine Douah; Substitutes: 1. Roughiyetou Hamidou M'Bogj
5	Alliance for Justice and Democracy/Movement for Renewal (AJD/MR) (Note: The Coalition Living Together-Coalition Living Together/Truth and Reconciliation is running through the Alliance for Justice and Democracy/Movement for Renewal party.): 1. Amadou Samba Boral Datt; Substitutes: 1. Ifra Yaya Ba

== Nouadhibou ==
#	List
1	National Rally for Reform and Development (Tewassoul): 1. Aziza Saleck Jiddou; 2. Seydi Aboubakry Cissokho; 3. Said Mahmoud Memlouk; 4. Aiché Dah Noueiguidh; Substitutes: 1. Mohamed El Mamy Sidi Abeidy; 2. Mohamedou Sid Ahmed Bouhoubeiny
2	National Democratic Alliance (AND): 1. Mohamed Mahmoud El Houssein Ghaly; 2. Aminetou Sidi Vall Ely Boudgha; 3. Oumar M'Bouha Guedj; 4. Khadijetou Mohamed Mahmoud Mamadou Diop; Substitutes: 1. Yarba Sidi Mohamed Sidi El Moctar
3	Republican Front for Unity and Democracy (FRUD) (Note: The Hope Mauritania coalition is running through the Republican Front for Unity and Democracy party.): 1. Ousmane Moussa Thiam; 2. Khadijetou Ali El Keihel; 3. Elyass Bemba Sghair M'Beirick; 4. Aminata Samba Gueye
4	Union of the Forces of Progress and Rally of Democratic Forces (UFP–RFD): 1. El Moctar Cheikh Sidiya; 2. Moussa Samba Camara; 3. Fatimetou Laghdaf Barka; 4. Zeinebou Abou Diop
5	Burst of Youth for the Nation (PSJN): 1. M'Hamed Mohamed Ahmed Wahenne; 2. Dveila Cheikh Ahmed Brike; 3. Boubakar Moussa Ethman; 4. Mahjouba Mohamed El Boukhary Youssouf
6	El Islah: 1. Brahim Ahmed El Haj El Moctar; 2. Lalia Gueladio Soumaré; 3. Salem Ahmedou Hediya; 4. Fatma Mohamed Fall N'Ghaya
7	Centre through Action for Progress (CAP): 1. Sidi Abdella Mohamed Lemine Hamady; 2. Mariem Fall Fall Ahmed Werzeg; 3. Mountagha Abdellahi Sakho; 4. Zeinebou Moussa Diop
8	Alliance for Justice and Democracy/Movement for Renewal (AJD/MR): 1. Khalidou Samba Sow; 2. Mariam Dembe Wade; 3. Mahmoudou Hamady N'Diaye; 4. Yahjebouha Cheikh El Kebir Lefghih; Substitutes: 1. Amadou Demba Dia; 2. Hawa Oumar Ba
9	Sawab: 1. Mouftah Vall Sneiba; 2. Moussa Bathia Konté; 3. Aminettou Mohamed Bedy; 4. Zeinebou Sidi Traoré; Substitutes: 1. Cheikh Sidati Mohamed Hamady; 2. Dah Madiop Ebjougmane
10	Party of Conciliation and Prosperity (HIWAR): 1. El Meimoun Ahmed Taleb Ethmane; 2. Aminetou Mohamed Zein; 3. Selem El Koury Blal; 4. Cheikh Mohamed Lemine Mohamed Cheikh; Substitutes: 1. Cheikh Mohamed Merzoug; 2. Moussa Harouna Dia
11	Nida El Watan: 1. Seyedna Oumar Mohamed El Hacen; 2. Mohamed El Mehdi Sidi Elmostaphe Bebana; 3. Hayaty Mahjoub Ahmed; 4. Varha Mohamedou Bembe Lelle
12	El Karama: 1. El Ghassem Bellali Bellali; 2. Malainine Bouchraye Cheikh El Wely; 3. Maty Aly Mane Aly Mane; 4. Haby Yero Barry; Substitutes: 1. Mohamed El Michri Mohamed Alioune Ismail; 2. Taleb Mostaph Hamadi Ahemdi
13	El Insaf: 1. Mohamed Abdellahi El Mamy El Ghailany; 2. Dah Mohamed Bilal; 3. Fatou Diop Moussa Gaye; 4. Fatimetou Ezizy Abeydy; Substitutes: 1. Abba Mohamed Mahmoud Abba; 2. Fatimetou Mohamed Lemine Haidala
14	Union for Planning and Building (UPC) (Note: The State of Justice Coalition is running through the Union for Planning and Building party.): 1. Vall Sidi Mohamed Demba; 2. Mariem Brahim M'Boirick; 3. Laghdaf Belkheir Salem; 4. Moukhtara Abdallahi Birama; Substitutes: 1. Meimouna R'Chid Amar; 2. Dekouma Dah Beibou
15	Republican Party for Democracy and Renewal (PRDR): 1. Zein Abidine Sadava Cheikh Ahmed; 2. Sidiya Souleymane Messoud; 3. Heijara El Hadrami Cheikh; 4. Halima Yaya Sy; Substitutes: 1. Cheikhna Mohamed Fofana; 2. Khedeija Ali Menane
16	El Vadila: 1. Douh Baba Benyoug; 2. Tewva Lemjed Amar; 3. Maaouiya Deiche Deiche; 4. Ghlana Ahmed Ely Hadad
17	Mauritanian Party of Union and Change (HATEM): 1. Mohamed Dah Ahmed Lebrahim; 2. Tiyeb Bilal Ahmeidily; 3. Moime Didi El Hacen; 4. Souad Mohamed Blal
18	Party of Unity and Development (PUD): 1. Harouna Ismail Lebaye; 2. Mohamed Mahmoud Sid'Ahmed Ivekou; 3. Aminetou Bah El Mostapha; 4. Mame Mariem Maleck Nam; Substitutes: 1. Sidi Mohamed Senda Sidi Mohamed; 2. Mohamed Brahim Khatary Sleimane
19	Party of Construction and Progress (PCP): 1. Mohamed Lemine Mohamed Habib Mohamed Bacar; 2. Mariem Waly El Gheilany; 3. Cheikhna Jeddou El Bou; 4. Aichetou Mamadou Sy
20	Party of the Mauritanian Masses (PMM): 1. Cheikh Othmane Othmane; 2. Fatma El Moustapha Bousnine; 3. Mekfoula Mohamed Hem Salem; 4. El Mokhtar Habib Salem
21	People's Progressive Alliance (APP): 1. Cheikh Alioune Moussa; 2. Mariem Mohamedou Messoud; 3. Soueidi Sidi Abeid; 4. Aicha Dadi Moussa; Substitutes: 1. Oumar Isselmou Fall; 2. Chrif Ahmed Salem Maaloume
22	El Ravah: 1. Mansour Brahim Boidaha; 2. Mariem Mohamed Mahmoud Abdy Ould Sidi; 3. Vatma Abdou Dicko; 4. Mohamed Abdellahi Lefdhil Beida
23	National Cohesion for Rights and the Construction of Generations (Ribat): 1. Sid'Ahmed Lehreitani Maimou; 2. Mamoudou Koly Thimbo; 3. Fedala Dah M'Aibess; 4. Salma Mounak Amhaed Belle; Substitutes: 1. Mohamed Hmeid Maatalla; 2. Mohamed Hady El Housseine Gueye
24	Union for Democracy and Progress (UDP): 1. Ahmed Mahmoud Barikalla Khayratt; 2. Youssef Abdou Athié; 3. Fatimata Abdoulaye Sy; 4. Dali Amadou Thiam; Substitutes: 1. Abdel Azize Yousouf Dieye; 2. Mohamed Mahmoud Mohamed Lemine Mohamed El Abd
