= List of candidates in the 2023 Mauritanian parliamentary election in Gorgol =

Candidates in the upcoming Mauritanian parliamentary election

This is the list of candidates for the 2023 Mauritanian parliamentary election, in the electoral districts of the wilaya of Gorgol. 25 parties were legally registered by the National Independent Election Commission and thus allowed to run in the election, with some coalitions running under the lists of a party.

The provisional lists were published by the National Independent Election Commission on a website on 12 April 2023, as the deadline expired on 13 April 2023.

== Kaédi ==
#	List
1	National Democratic Alliance (AND): 1. Babe Douh Begnoug; 2. Aicha M'Barka Mohamed Mahmoud Mory; 3. Ahmed Mohamed Yahya Mohamed Sidi; Substitutes: 1. Mariam Mohamed El Moubarack; 2. Mohamed Mohamedou M'Bareck; 3. Cheikh Sidi Sedigh
2	National Rally for Reform and Development (Tewassoul): 1. El Aliya Brahim Awoinena; 2. Abou Amadou Welé; 3. Otto Abdellahi Diop; Substitutes: 1. Hamadi Houssein Sow; 2. Fatimetou Hemedi D'Weya; 3. Mohamed Salem Dhou Nouraini El Bou
3	Union of the Forces of Progress (UFP): 1. Bakary Cheikhou Wague; 2. Diariata Mokhtar Cheikh Sow; 3. Tete Mohamed Harouna; Substitutes: 1. Mama Mohamed Cheikhna Diagana; 2. Samba Amar Vendé; 3. Issa Abdoulaye Sow
4	Centre through Action for Progress (CAP): 1. Sid'Ahmed M'Haimid Elkowry; 2. Aïssata Aly Barry; 3. El Hassen Bah Sidi; Substitutes: 1. Lalla Aly Salem; 2. Mamina Kaza Outhmane; 3. Koumba M'Bareck El Moctar
5	El Islah: 1. Seybane Sidi Amadou Diagana; 2. Aissata Amadou Sow; 3. Abdoul Alassane Sy; Substitutes: 1. Djeinaba Abdoulaye Sow; 2. Maciré Sidi Marega; 3. Khoumba Tidiani Wagué
6	El Insaf: 1. Moussa Demba Sow; 2. Zeinebou Owbeck Bilal; 3. Abdoulaye Aly Oiga; Substitutes: 1. Zeinebou Mohamed Sidi Ely Mahmoud; 2. Aminetou Harouna Sow; 3. Oumar Yero Diallo
7	Republican Front for Unity and Democracy (FRUD) (Note: The Hope Mauritania coalition is running through the Republican Front for Unity and Democracy party.): 1. Amina Djibi N'Diaye; 2. Djiby Demba Sy; 3. Maya Boubou Thiam; Substitutes: 1. Elhousseinou Hamet Babou; 2. Aicha Mohamed Koussa; 3. Ousmane Mahmoud Abdi
8	Alliance for Justice and Democracy/Movement for Renewal (AJD/MR) (Note: The Coalition Living Together-Coalition Living Together/Truth and Reconciliation is running through the Alliance for Justice and Democracy/Movement for Renewal party.): 1. Ousmane Oumar Ba; 2. Leiya Oumar Fall; 3. Mamadou Saidou Kane; Substitutes: 1. Fatimata Abdarrahmane Toury; 2. Ibrahima Mamadou Aly Dia; 3. Yarya Mamadou Kane
9	People's Progressive Alliance (APP): 1. Issa Moussa N'Diaye; 2. Mariem Ahmed Mewloud; 3. Mohamed Baba Malick Mhaimid; Substitutes: 1. Oumou Amadou Sow; 2. Racine Amadou Tidiani Ly; 3. Yenge' Abeid Ahmed Deina
10	El Karama: 1. Cheikh Mohamed Moumel; 2. Lemina Mohamed Vadel Wene; 3. Nour Dine Mohamed Idda; Substitutes: 1. Souleimane Amadou Bane; 2. Vatimetou Abou Ba; 3. Mohamed Ghaber Sneibe
11	Burst of Youth for the Nation (PSJN): 1. Cheikh Ahmed Maleck Telmoudi; 2. Aminetou Mohamed Lemine El Ketab; 3. Souleimane Mohamedou N'Dongo; Substitutes: 1. Matam Alpha Ba; 2. Sedigh Ali M'Barka; 3. Billé Hamadi Sy
12	Party of Conciliation and Prosperity (HIWAR): 1. Ahmed Sidy Ahmed Diabo; 2. Fatimetou Brahim El Ghalawy; 3. Yahya Nagi Mhaimid; Substitutes: 1. Brahim Mohamed Yaly; 2. Aissata Samba Sy; 3. Othmane Mohamed Beilil
13	Union for Democracy and Progress (UDP): 1. Mohamed Abdoul N'Diaye; 2. Selem El Bechir Mohamed Sidi; 3. Cheikh Tahara Kandé Baradji; Substitutes: 1. Sileye Siguira Fall; 2. Sidi Brahim Ramdhane; 3. Abdoul Djibi Sow
14	National Cohesion for Rights and the Construction of Generations (Ribat): 1. Baba Taher Sar; 2. Oumou Nasri Cheikh Mohamed; 3. El Moctar Soueilim Dowma; Substitutes: 1. Abdoulaye Youssouf Niane; 2. Aissata Demba Sy; 3. Idi Amadou N'Diaye
15	Mauritanian Party of Union and Change (HATEM): 1. Bocar Tidjani Ly; 2. Aissata Djibril Diallo; 3. Zeiny M'Baerck Amar; Substitutes: 1. Ousmane Mamadou Thierno N'Diadé; 2. Youba Moussa Konté; 3. Alassane Fodé Djita Konaté
16	Sawab (Note: The Sawab–RAG Coalition is running through the Sawab party.): 1. Kadiatou Oumar Ba; 2. Oumar Binné Diarra; 3. Aboubecrine Salem Abeid Barka; Substitutes: 1. Harouna Mamoudou Ba; 2. Dindi Samba Simagha; 3. Ousmane Daouda Diallo
17	Party of Unity and Development (PUD): 1. Mariem Kaba Coulibaly; 2. Yahya Vadil Brahim; 3. Khayte Sidi El Yemani; Substitutes: 1. Tarba Oumar Brahim; 2. Cheibany El Moctar Abd El Wedoud
18	El Vadila: 1. Ibrahima Demba Dem; 2. Salamata Saidou Ball; 3. Tarba Meissara Salem; Substitutes: 1. Aminetou Dite Goundo Wagué Abd El Ghoudouss Diallo; 2. Hamadi Oumar Ba; 3. Tako Oumar Sow

== Lexeiba ==
#	List
1	National Rally for Reform and Development (Tewassoul): 1. Babah Mohamed Moustapha; Substitutes: 1. Mohamed Mahmoud Sall
2	El Insaf: 1. Mohamed Abdallahi Mamoudou Kane; Substitutes: 1. Maata Cheikh Erhil
3	National Cohesion for Rights and the Construction of Generations (Ribat): 1. Yahya Yenja Sidi Amar; Substitutes: 1. M'Hamed Bedi Mohamed S'Ghair
4	Mauritanian Party of Union and Change (HATEM): 1. Abdel Baghi Hama R'Hayil; Substitutes: 1. Naj Mohamed And
5	Union for Democracy and Progress (UDP): 1. Abdoulaye Alassane Ba; Substitutes: 1. Ibnou Issa Abderrhmane Ahmed
6	El Karama: 1. Mohamed Taghioullah Mamine Sidaty; Substitutes: 1. Oumar Thioiry Diallo
7	Sawab: 1. Zoubeir M' Bareck Mesoud; Substitutes: 1. Mohamed Lemine Malick Mohamed El Abd
8	Alliance for Justice and Democracy/Movement for Renewal (AJD/MR): 1. Hachem Alpha Diako; Substitutes: 1. Amadou Tidjany El Hadj Abou Sy

== Maghama ==
#	List
1	El Insaf: 1. Mamoudou Mamadou Niang; 2. Hachem Samoury M'Bareck Sebkha; Substitutes: 1. Moussa El Hadji Hamidou Barry; 2. Mamadou Abdoul Khoudouss Diallo
2	Union for Democracy and Progress (UDP): 1. Abdoulaye Demba Diop; 2. Mamoudou Daouda Gueye; Substitutes: 1. Yahya Djiby Dabo; 2. Mohamadou Samba Barry
3	Sawab: 1. Mamadou Saïdou Komé; 2. Mamadou Ousmane Ousmane Mamadou Sy; Substitutes: 1. Ousmane Abou N'Dongo; 2. Silèye Daouda Sow
4	Nida El Watan: 1. Abdoulaye Mamadou Diallo; 2. Alassane Mamadou Sow; Substitutes: 1. Aminata Samba Soumare; 2. Oum Kelthoum Cheikh Nagi Henoune
5	Alliance for Justice and Democracy/Movement for Renewal (AJD/MR): 1. Kalidou Abderrahmane Thiam; 2. Fatimata Mamadou Thiam; Substitutes: 1. Ismael Sidou; 2. Malal Amadou Fall
6	Union of the Forces of Progress (UFP): 1. Haimout Samba Ba; 2. Ousmane Oumar N'Gaidé; Substitutes: 1. Benda Camara; 2. Zakariya Ba
7	El Vadila: 1. Mamadou Samba Bâ; 2. Ibrahima Abd El Ghoudouss Diallo; Substitutes: 1. Raghiya Abd El Ghoudouss Diallo; 2. Abdoulaye Adama Thiam
8	El Ravah and Party of Unity and Development (El Ravah–PUD): 1. Mohamed Seyid Seyid; 2. Ibrahim Oumar Diop; Substitutes: 1. Ibrahima Oumar Barro; 2. Youssouf Harouna Anne

== M'Bout ==
No candidacies were listed on the National Independent Election Commission's website as per 14 April 2023.

== Monguel ==
#	List
1	El Insaf: 1. H'bib Brahim Diah; 2. Sidi Ahmed Ghaber; Substitutes: 1. Mohamed Brahim El Moctar Bilal; 2. Mohamed Hamidine Diallo
2	Sawab: 1. Oumar Mekiyen Mohamed Salem; 2. M'Barcka Ramdhane Abdatt; Substitutes: 1. Mahmoud Mohamed Messoud; 2. Zoubeir Sidi Messaoud
3	Union for Democracy and Progress (UDP): 1. Sidi Mohamed Bah Brahim; 2. Limame Isselmou Teguedi; Substitutes: 1. Meky Ahmedou Bellal; 2. Alioune Mohamed M'Heimid
4	Republican Party for Democracy and Renewal and Union of the Forces of Progress (PRDR–UFP): 1. Ahmed Abdawe Diah; 2. Dawa Ghouein El Mestehdi; Substitutes: 1. Lehbib Mahmoud Yereigh; 2. Nani Greijouma Amar
5	Party of Construction and Progress (PCP): 1. Amadou Oumar Bayal; 2. Hapsatou Belel Sow; Substitutes: 1. Maimouna Samba Ba; 2. Hamady Samba Ba
