= List of conflicts in Mali =

Location of Mali in Africa.

== Medieval Times ==
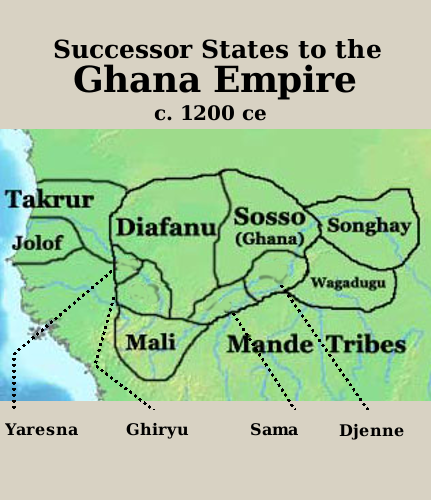
The location of the Sosso Empire in West Africa

=== Sosso Empire ===
- c. 970 — c. 1240 Decline of the Ghana Empire
  - c. 1,075 Almoravid conquest of the Ghana Empire
  - c. 1100 — c. 1235 Aftermath and Sosso Occupation
- c. 1217 — c. 1230 Pre-imperial expansion of the Mali Empire
  - c. 1217 — c. 1255 Campaigns of Sundiata Keita
    - c. 1235 Battle of Kirina
  - c. 1217 — c. 1255 Campaigns of Fakoli and Fran

=== Mali Empire ===
- 1235 — 1230 Pre-imperial expansion
  - c. 1235 — c. 1255 Campaigns of Sundiata Keita
    - c. 1235 Battle of Kirina
  - c. 1235 — c. 1255 Campaigns of Fakoli and Fran
- 1235 — 1250 Early imperial expansion of the Mali Empire
  - 1235 — 1255 Tiramakhan's western campaign
  - 1255 — 1270 Expansion under Mansa Ouali I
  - Civil war and rebellion
  - 1285 — 1300 Re-conquest and expansion under Mansa Sakura
- 1300 — 1337 The empire at its zenith
- 1337 — 1440 The fragmenting empire
  - 1337 — 1440 The secession of Gao and the Mossi raids
  - The Jolof Empire
  - 1374 The Eastern Revolt
  - c. 1400 The Sandaki usurpation and second Mossi raid
  - The Diawara Revolt
  - c. 1433 The Tuareg invasion

Approximate extent of the Mali Empire, next to the Songhai Empire, c. 1350

- 1440 — 1490 The empire on the defensive
  - The Portuguese
  - Songhai hegemony
  - Tengela War
- 1500 — 1600 Collapse of the Mali empire
  - Songhay hegemony in the Sahel
  - The Songhay respite and the battle for Bambuk
  - The Rise of the Kaabu Empire
  - The Sack of Niani
  - Further losses
  - April 26, 1599 Battle of Jenné

The Mali Empire, the Songhai Empire and surrounding states, c. 1530

=== Songhai Empire ===
- 1440 — 1490 The Mali Empire on the Defensive
  - The Portuguese
  - Songhai hegemony
  - Tengela War
- 1500 — 1600 Collapse of the Mali Empire
  - Songhay hegemony in the Sahel
  - The Songhay respite and the Battle for Bambuk
  - The Rise of the Kaabu Empire
  - The Sack of Niani
  - Further losses
  - April 26, 1599 Battle of Jenné
- 1578 — 1603 Campaigns of Ahmad al-Mansur of the Saadi dynasty of Morocco
  - October 16, 1590 — March 13, 1591 Songhai campaign
    - March 13, 1591 Battle of Tondibi
- April 26, 1599 Battle of Jenné

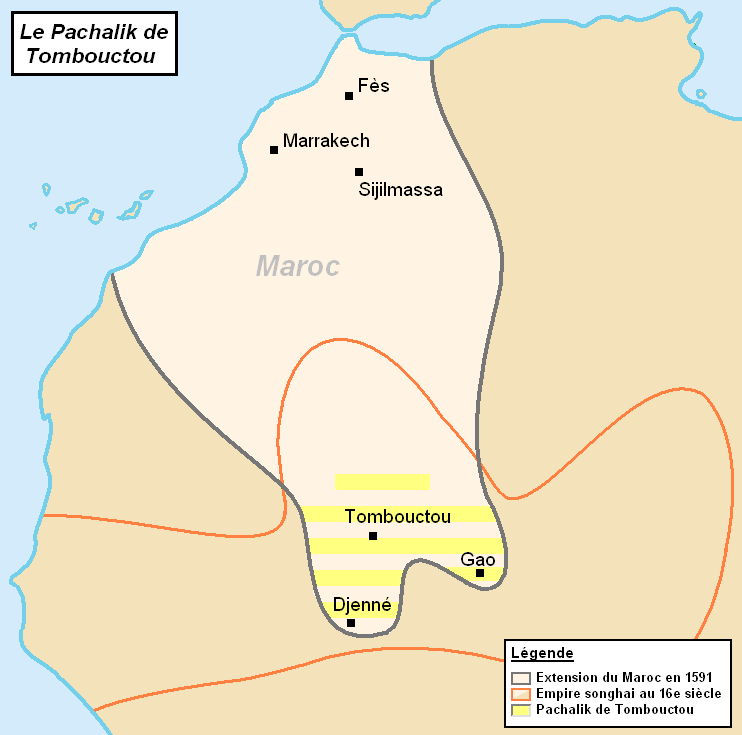
Map of the Pashalik of Timbuktu (yellow-striped) as part of the Saadi dynasty of Morocco (outlined black) within the Songhai Empire (outlined red), c. 1591

== Modern Times ==
=== Massina Empire ===
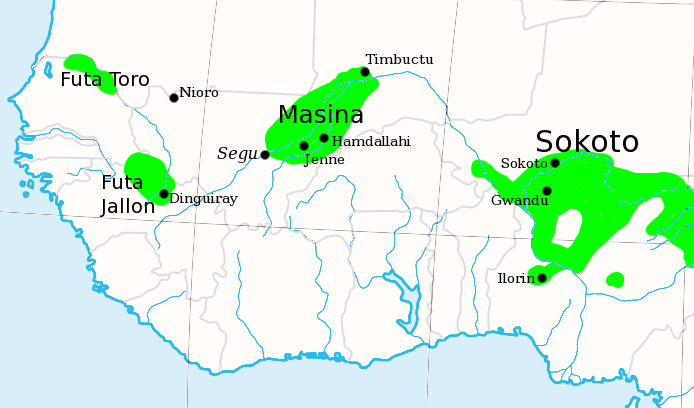
The Fulani Jihad States of West Africa, c. 1830

- c. 1776 — April 20, 1845 Campaigns of Seku Amadu
  - 1810 — 1818 Jihad of Seku Amadu

=== Toucouleur Empire ===
- c. 1797 — 1864 Campaigns of El Hadj Umar Tall
  - 1848 — 1864 Initial conquests
    - 1659 — 1958 French colonisation in Africa
      - April 1857 Siege of Medina Fort
  - March 10, 1861 — March 16, 1862 Conquest of the Bamana Empire
    - March 10, 1861 Battle of Segou

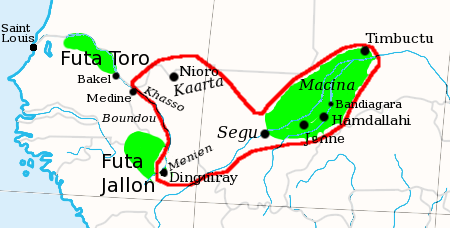
The greatest extent of the Toucouleur Empire at the time of El Hadj Umar Tall's death in 1864

=== Wassoulou Empire ===
- 1883 — 1886 Mandingo Wars

=== Republic of Mali ===
- 1916 — 2012 Tuareg rebellions
  - 1962 — 1964 First Tuareg rebellion
- 1985 Agacher Strip War
- 1990 — 1995 Azawad insurgency and Malian civil war
- October 7, 2001 — ongoing war on terror
  - 2002 — ongoing Insurgency in the Maghreb
    - February 6, 2007 — ongoing Operation Enduring Freedom – Trans Sahara
    - February 2007 — May 2009 Second Tuareg rebellion
    - December 8, 2010 — ongoing Arab Spring
      - 2012 — ongoing Northern Mali conflict
        - 2012 — Third Tuareg Rebellion
          - January 18, 2012 — March 11, 2012 Battle of Tessalit
          - January 17, 2012 — January 25, 2012 Battle of Aguelhok
          - February 7, 2012 — February 8, 2012 Battle of Tinzaouaten
        - March 21, 2012 — April 8, 2012 Malian coup d'état
        - June 27, 2012 — ongoing Internal conflict in Azawad
          - June 26, 2012 — June 27, 2012 Battle of Gao
          - November 16, 2012 — November 20, 2012 Battle of Menaka
          - February 22, 2013 — February 23, 2013 Battle of Khalil
          - March 29, 2013 — March 30, 2013 Battle of In Arab
        - January 11, 2013 — ongoing Operation Serval

== See also ==
- List of wars involving Mali
- Military of Mali
- Mali Army
- Mali Air Force
- Military history of the Mali Empire
- Military history of Africa
- African military systems to 1800
- African military systems 1800 — 1900
- African military systems after 1900
