= List of conflicts in Senegal =

Location of Senegal (dark blue).

== Medieval Times ==
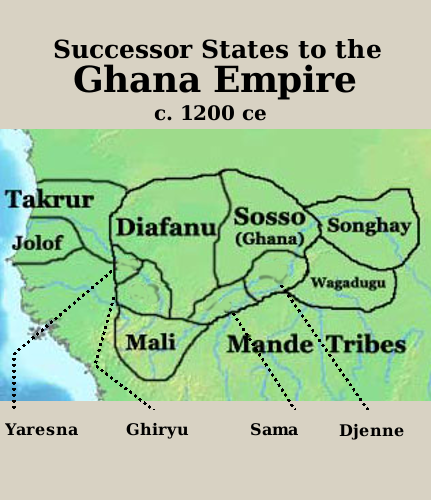
The location of the Jolof Empire in West Africa

=== Mali Empire ===
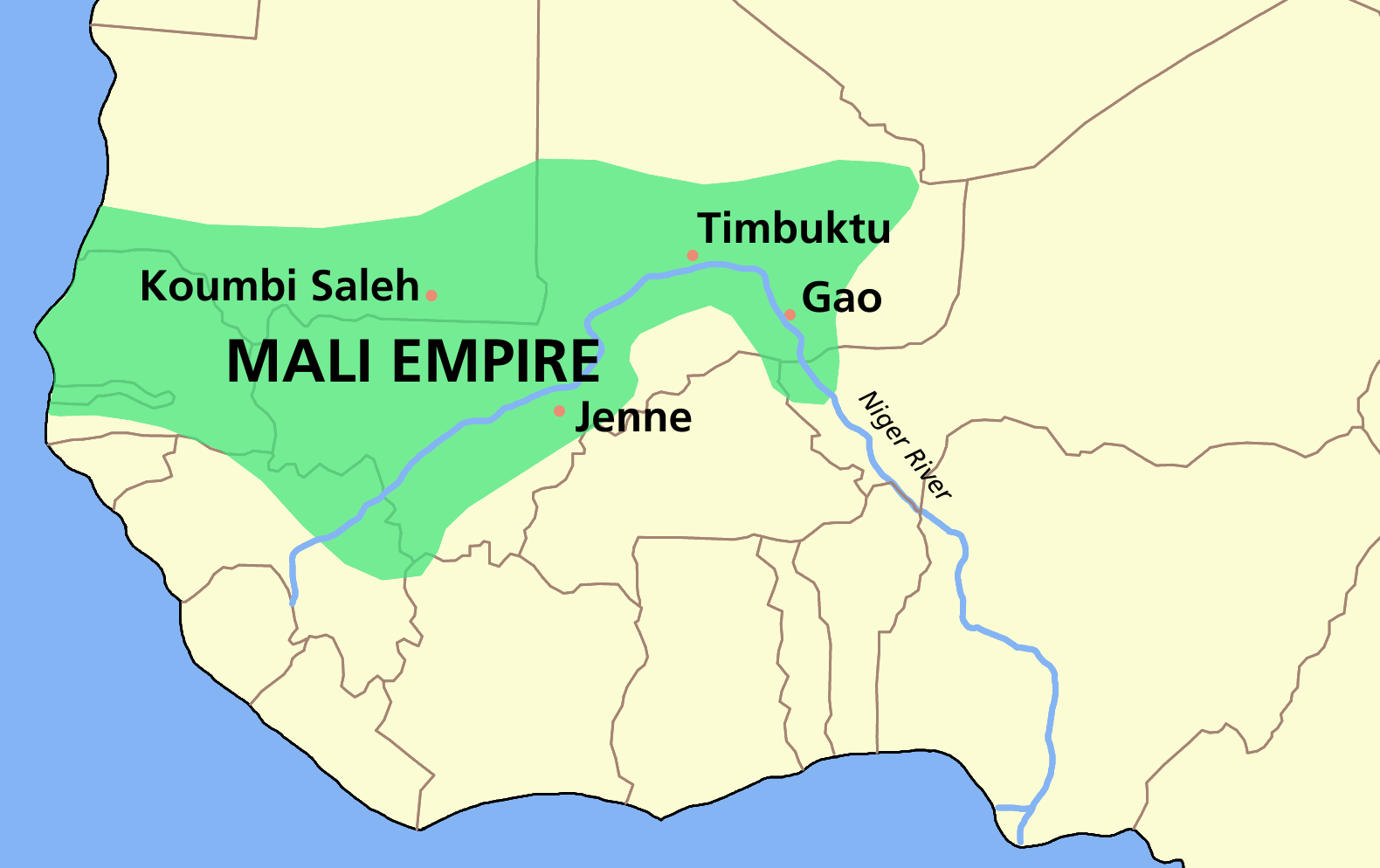
Extent of the Mali Empire (circa 1,350 C.E.)

- 1,235 C.E. — 1,250 C.E. Early imperial expansion of the Mali Empire
  - 1,235 C.E. — 1,255 C.E. Tiramakhan's western campaign
    - Tiramakhan, also known as Tiramaghan, of the Traore clan, was ordered by Sonjata to bring an army west after the king of Jolof had allowed horses to be stolen from Mandekalu merchants. The king of Jolof also sent a message to the young emperor referring to him as an upstart. By the time Tiramakhan's forces were done three kings were dead, and the Jolof ruler was reduced to a vassal. The new western portion of the empire settlement would become an outpost that encompassed not only northern Guinea-Bissau but the Gambia and the Casamance region of Senegal (named for the Mandinka province of Casa or Cassa ruled by the Casa-Mansa).

=== Songhai Empire ===
- 1,440 C.E. — 1,490 C.E. The Mali Empire on the Defensive
  - 1,444 C.E. The Portuguese arrived on the Senegambian coast in 1444, and they were not coming in peace. Using caravels to launch slave raids on coastal inhabitants,

== Modern Times ==
=== Kingdom of Waalo ===
- 1,659 C.E. French conquest of Senegal

=== French West Africa ===
- 1,754 C.E. — 1,763 C.E. Seven Years' War
  - April 1,758 C.E. — May 1,758 C.E. Capture of Senegal
  - December 1,758 C.E. Capture of Gorée
- September 1, 1,939 C.E. — September 2, 1,945 C.E. World War II
  - September 23, 1,940 C.E. — September 25, 1,940 C.E. Battle of Dakar

== See also ==
- Military of Senegal
- Senegalese Army
- Senegalese Navy
- Senegalese Air Force
- Military history of Africa
- African military systems to 1,800 C.E.
- African military systems 1,800 C.E. — 1,900 C.E.
- African military systems after 1,900 C.E.
