= Malian-Songhai Wars =

| Date | 1450s-1570 |
| Location | Sahel, West Africa |

Belligerents
| Mali Empire | Songhai Empire |

Commanders and leaders
| Uli II; Mahmud III | Sulayman Dama; Sunni Ali; Askia Muhammad I Askia Daoud |

The Malian-Songhai Wars were a series of conflicts during the 15th and 16th centuries between the Mali Empire and the Songhai Empire.

== Late Middle Age ==
The Mali Empire had begun withdrawing from the area during the 1430s, giving Sulayman Dama room to occupy Gao. During the 1450s he invaded the region of Méma. Around 1469/71 Sonni Ali successfully laid siege to Djenné, taking it out of Mali's sphere of influence. He afterwards attempted an invasion deeper into Malian territory in 1475 but was met with a serious defeat that temporarily halted the attacks into Mali's core. In 1483 Sonni Ali captured Wagadu, the region of the ancient Ghana Empire.

== Early Modern Period ==
Between the late 15th and mid 16th century, the emergence of independent dynasties such as the Askiya dynasty of Songhai and the Tengella of Futa Toro challenged Mali's control of its northern provinces, and several battles were fought in the region between the three powers. Between 1501 and 1507, Mali lost its northern provinces of Baghana, Dialan, and Kalanbut to Askia Muhammad of the Songhai Empire, just as the regions of Masina and Futa Toro in the northwest fell to the Tengella rulers and other local potentates.

In 1501 Askia Muhammad sent his brother Umar Komadiakha to Dialan to fight Qama Fati Qalli, a governor on behalf of Mahmud III. This initial attack was repelled, leading Askia Muhammad with his army to come in person, defeating Qama and sacking the town. In 1507 he continued his fight with Mali, campaigning as far as Kilanbut.

Mali still remained a threat to Songhai and would often invade the regions west of Djenné. In 1544 the Songhai general, and later ruler of Songhai Daoud, led an invasion against Mali and sacked its capital. The Askia of Songhai launched more raids against them in 1550. The two would clash again in 1558, ending in the defeat of the Malian general Ma’ Kanti Faran and the marriage of the Mansas daughter to Askia Daoud. Mali was able to push the Songhai border back by 1571, with Bendugu and Kala falling back under its authority and seemed to be sheltering opponents of the Askiya's.
