= African military systems after 1900 =

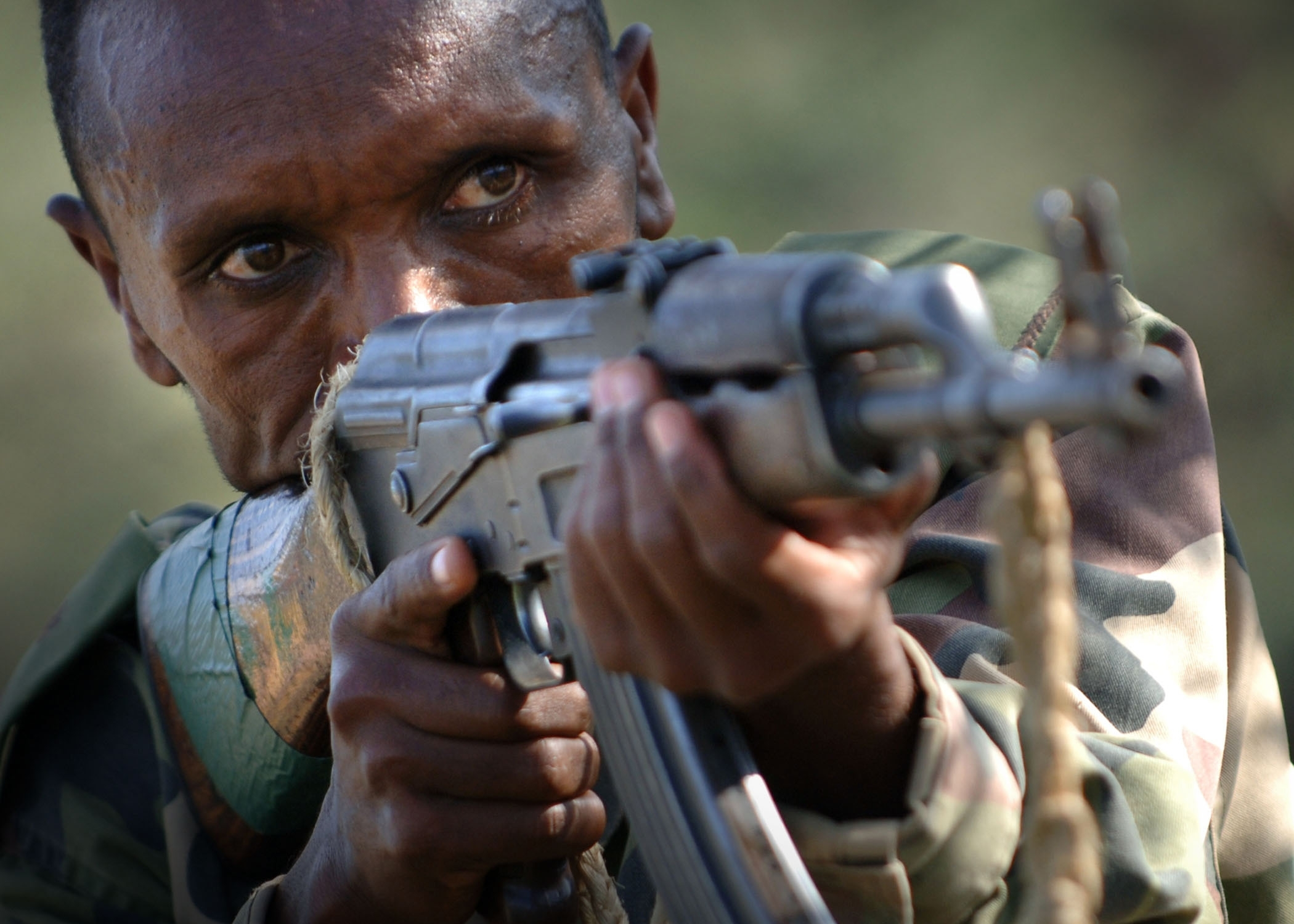
Soldier of the Ethiopian National Defense Force, 2006

Just before the 20th century began, most of Africa, with the exception of Ethiopia, and Liberia, was under colonial rule. By the 1980s, most nations were independent. Military systems reflect this evolution in several ways:

- Growth of indigenous knowledge and skill in handling modern arms
- Established colonial armies of mainly indigenous troops officered by Europeans
- Rebellions, resistance and "mop up" operations
- Weakening of European colonial power due to World War I and World War II
- Decolonization and the transition to the militaries of the new African states
- Wars of national liberation across the continent particularly the northern and southern regions
- Frequent tribal or civil wars across the continent
- Frequent military coups against the post colonial regimes
- Continued strength of regional powers like Egypt and South Africa
- The rise of asymmetric forces and failed states
- The rise of international forces and bureaucracies
- Continued challenges and evolution into the 21st century

For events prior to 1800, see African military systems to 1800. For events between 1800 and 1900, see African military systems (1800–1900). For an overall view of the military history of Africa by region, see Military History of Africa. Below are the major activities and events that shaped African military systems into the 20th and 21st century.

== Rebellions, resistance, and "mop up" operations ==
Colonial map of Africa, 1913. Belgian German Spanish French British Italian Portuguese Independent

By 1900, the imperial powers had won most of the initial major battles against indigenous powers, or had occupied strategic areas such as coastlines, to secure their dominance. Colonies were established or expanded across the landscape- sometimes eagerly, as in the case of major mineral finds- or sometimes forced on the imperial center by the outlying actions of grasping or ambitious settlers, merchants, military officers, and bureaucrats. The complexity of African responses to the new order defies a simple narrative of good versus evil. In some cases the intruders were welcomed as useful allies, saviours or counterweights in local disputes. In other cases, they were bitterly resisted. In some areas, the colonial regimes brought massive land confiscations, violence and what some see as genocide. In others they brought education, better security, new products and skills, and improved standards of infrastructure and living.

The historical record shows destructive operations by both indigenous hegemony and foreign intruders. Some of the methods used by the colonial powers are also reflected in armed European conflicts. Murdered peasants, livestock and grain seizures, arbitrary quartering of troops, and massive theft and looting by roaming armies for example, are common occurrences in various eras of European military history. Napoleon's brutal occupation of Spain is but one example. Nor did the colonial era see a complete cessation of purely internal disputes and wars. These were much reduced from the 19th century due to the colonial conquests, but still occurred in some areas with varying levels of intensity. Some limited areas of North Africa, such as Libya, were still under the sway of non-European powers like the Ottomans, adding to the complexity of the colonial situation.

Whatever the balance sheet in different areas, it is clear that consolidation and exploitation of the new territories involved a large measure of coercion, and this often provoked a military reply. The exact form of such coercion varied- it could be land seizures, forced labor, hut taxes, interference in local quarrels, monopolism of trade, small-scale punitive expeditions, or outright warfare of genocidal intensity as that waged by the Germans against the Herero and Namaqua (or Nama) in southwest Africa. African military responses in this "mop up" or "pacification" period of the century's first decades were diverse- ranging from minor rebellions and revolts, sustained guerilla warfare, and full scale clashes. Only a few of these varying responses are considered here in terms of African military systems.

- Cavalry: the demise of the Sokoto Caliphate, one of the major powers in the savannah regions of West Africa
- Guerilla warfare: the Herrero and Nama versus the Germans
- Major warfare: the massive Rif War in Spanish Morocco

=== Twilight of the mounted man ===
Last charge of the cavalry. Armed with spear, bow and sword, and accompanied by deafening music, Ouaddai's forces held to the old methods- mass cavalry charges followed by the infantry. These were insufficient against modern weapons.

West Africa's largest single state during the 19th century, the Sokoto Caliphate of northern Nigeria moved into the 20th century with its military system intact- the traditional mix of infantry and cavalry. New powers and technologies however were appearing on the scene. Some cavalry-strong states like the Tukolor, made sporadic attempts to incorporate weapons like artillery but integration was poor. Sokoto largely stuck to the old ways, was annexed and incorporated in the British Empire in 1903. Sokoto's soldiers, whether horse or foot, had very few guns. The Caliphate's tactics were to attack in a series of set-piece battles, with thundering cavalry charges leading the way, followed by infantry armed with bow, sword and spear. As the fighting men surged forward into combat, their movements were accompanied by loud music and drums These however were not enough, and assaults were quickly routed by the modern weaponry of virtually invulnerable British squares. Traditional fortified cities and forts also made a poor showing and were usually rapidly breached by British artillery. Thus ended the heyday of the centuries-old West African cavalry-infantry combination. In Southern Africa the mounted men of the Boer forces also saw defeat in 1902, as imperial troops implemented a blockade and scorched earth policy against their mobile tactics. This outcome paralleled general developments on the battlefield, as mounted forces gradually lost their relevance under modern firepower.

=== Guerilla warfare in Southwest Africa ===
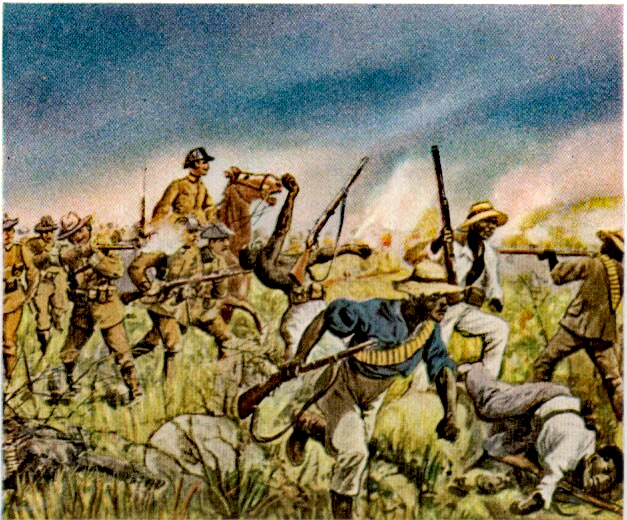
The harsh extermination methods of German commander von Trotha provoked an outcry in some areas of Germany. Thousands of Herero perished in the conflict.

Guerilla warfare was a common military response in many areas of Africa during the early colonial era. The bitter 1904–1907 war between imperial Germany and the Herero tribe in today's Namibia is an illustration of this pattern, with tragic consequences for the indigenous resistance, including concentration camps, forced labor, and a scorched earth extermination policy that even some contemporary Germans found repugnant. In August 1904, German colonial troops under commander Lothar von Trotha, carried out a ruthless cleansing campaign against the recalcitrant Herero and Nama tribes, who had risen in revolt against increasing white demands for land, labor and cattle. Several white farmers were killed in the rising and thousands of cattle were collected. General von Trotha counterattacked with well equipped modern troops, and refused Herero offers to negotiate surrender. His extermination proclamation, issued on October 2, 1904, read in part: "Every Herero found within German borders, with or without guns, with or without livestock, will be shot. I will not give shelter to any Herero women or children.." An estimated 75,000 Herero and Nama were slaughtered. Thousands were killed in battle and in the aftermath, victorious German forces chased the survivors into the waterless Omaheke Desert, physically preventing any from returning. Thousands of men, women and children died of thirst and starvation. Many of those Herero and Nama that survived this slaughter were sent to specially erected concentration camps or to forced employment on German commercial farms. Hundreds of civilians died due to the inhumane conditions in the camps and on the farms. The liquidation of the blacks opened the way for the seizure of land and cattle and consolidated European control over the territory.

=== The Rif Wars ===
Relatively small bodies of imperial regulars or European-led indigenous troops carried out most military operations in Africa during the post 1900 colonial era. The Rif wars however saw major formations deployed by both France and Spain to crush native resistance

The Rif wars are relatively obscure compared to the well known Ethiopian victory at Adowa or that of the Zulu at Isandhlwana. Nevertheless, it was a significant demonstration of large scale warfare by indigenous troops, and fighters of the Moroccan Rif and J'bala tribes dealt several defeats to Spanish forces in Morocco over their course. It took a massive collaboration by French and Spanish forces to finally liquidate resistance in 1925.

==== Early defeats of the Spanish ====
The Rif War of 1920, also called the Second Moroccan War, was fought between Spain (later assisted by France) and the Moroccan Rif and J'bala tribes. Spain moved to conquer the lands around Melilla and Ceuta and the eastern territory from the Jibala tribes during the 1920s. In 1921 Spanish troops suffered a momentous defeat — known in Spain as the disaster of Annual — by the forces of Abd el-Krim, the leader of the Rif tribes. The Spanish were pushed back and during the following five years, occasional battles were fought between the two. In a bid to break the stalemate, the Spanish military turned to the use of chemical weapons against the Riffians. The Berber tribesmen had a long tradition of fierce fighting skills, combined with high standards of fieldcraft and marksmanship. They were capably led by Abd el-Krim who showed both military and political expertise. The elite of the Riffian forces formed regular units which according to Abd el-Krim, quoted by the Spanish General Manual Goded, numbered 6–7,000. The remaining Riffians were tribal militia selected by their Caids and not liable to serve away from their homes and farms for more than fifteen consecutive days. General Goded estimates that at their peak the Riffian forces numbered about 80,000 men. Spanish troops in Morocco were initially mainly Metropolitan conscripts. While capable of enduring much hardship they were poorly trained and supplied, with widespread corruption reported amongst the officer corps. Accordingly, much reliance was placed on the limited number of professional units comprising the Spanish "Army of Africa". Since 1911 these had included regiments of Moorish Regulares. A Spanish equivalent of the French Foreign Legion, the Tercio de Extranjeros ("Regiment of Foreigners"), was also formed in 1920. The regiment's second commander was General Francisco Franco.

==== Entry of France into the war and collaboration between France and Spain ====
In May 1924, the French Army had established a line of posts north of the Ouregha River in disputed tribal territory. On 13 April 1925, an estimated 8,000 Rifs attacked this line and in two weeks 39 of 66 French posts had been stormed or abandoned. The French accordingly intervened on the side of Spain, employing up to 300,000 well trained and equipped troops from Metropolitan, North African, Senegalese and Foreign Legion units. French deaths in what had now become a major war are estimated at about 12,000. Superior manpower and technology soon resolved the course of the war in favour of France and Spain. The French troops pushed through from the south while the Spanish fleet secured Alhucemas Bay by an amphibious landing, and began attacking from the north. After one year of bitter resistance, Abd el-Krim, the leader of both the tribes, surrendered to French authorities, and in 1926 Spanish Morocco was finally retaken.

== Impact of World War I and World War II ==
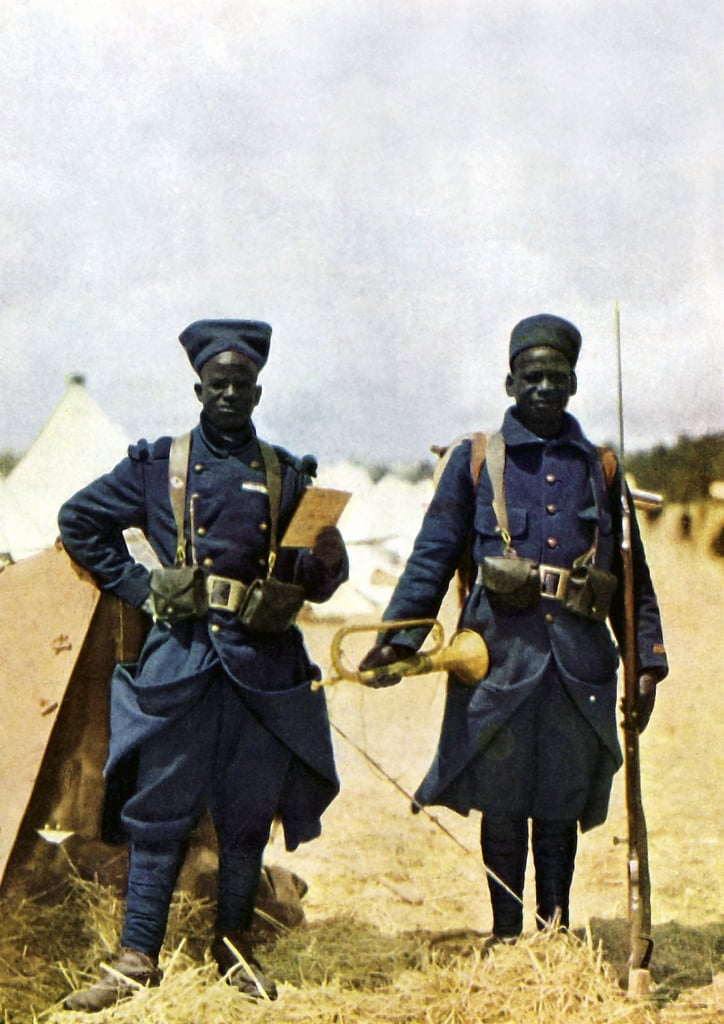
Tirailleurs Senegalais, 1915. Over 500,000 African troops served in World War I, constituting a major manpower resource for France. French West Africans fought in every major battle, playing a notable role at Verdun.

The massive conflicts of World War I and World War II were to have important effects on African military development. Hundreds of thousands of African troops served in Europe and the Pacific and gained new military skills via their exposure to new forms of organization, handling of advanced weaponry, and intense modern combat. The exposure to a wider world during the two conflicts opened up a sense of new possibilities, and opportunities. These were eventually to be reflected in demands for greater freedom in homeland colonies. The success of peoples like the Japanese also demonstrated that European forces were not invincible, and post-war weakening of many former imperial powers provided new scope in challenging the colonial order.

=== World War I ===
France deployed hundreds of thousands of African fighting men to aid its cause, including some 300,000 North Africans, some 250,000 West Africans and thousands more from other regions. Over 140,000 African soldiers for example, fought on the Western Front during World War I and thousands of others fought at Gallipoli and in the Balkans. French West African troops fought and died in all the major battles of the Western Front, from Verdun (where they were instrumental in recapturing a fort) to the Armistice. Some writers (Lunn 1999) argue that towards the end of World War I, the black soldiers were increasingly being used as shock troops, and were absorbing three times as many casualties as white French troops. The French did offer such incentives as citizenship for those who fought, and French leader Clemeanceau pushed for continued recruitment of West Africans to fight for France, maintaining that it was better blacks were killed than long-suffering white Frenchmen. One in five West African combat soldiers who fought in World War I died in the war, compared to less than 17% for the French. Colonial troops such as Indian regiments in British employ suffered less.

During the conflict, African soldiers were not simply local enforcers of colonial hegemony, but also served as a major combat reserve for use in European conflicts. The case of the British Indian Army, including its elite Gurkha regiments is well known in this role, but the Senegalese and other African regiments of France demonstrate a similar pattern from Africa. Based on a variety of contemporary accounts, the performance of many African units was excellent, and both their German enemies and American allies accord them respect in a wide range of commentary, particularly fighting units from Morocco and regiments of Tirailleurs Senegalais from France's Armee coloniale. One French commander, commander of the 58th Regiment on the Western Front favored the employment of blacks as shock troops to save white lives: "finally and above all superb attack troops permitting the saving of the lives of whites, who behind them exploit their success and organize the positions they conquer."

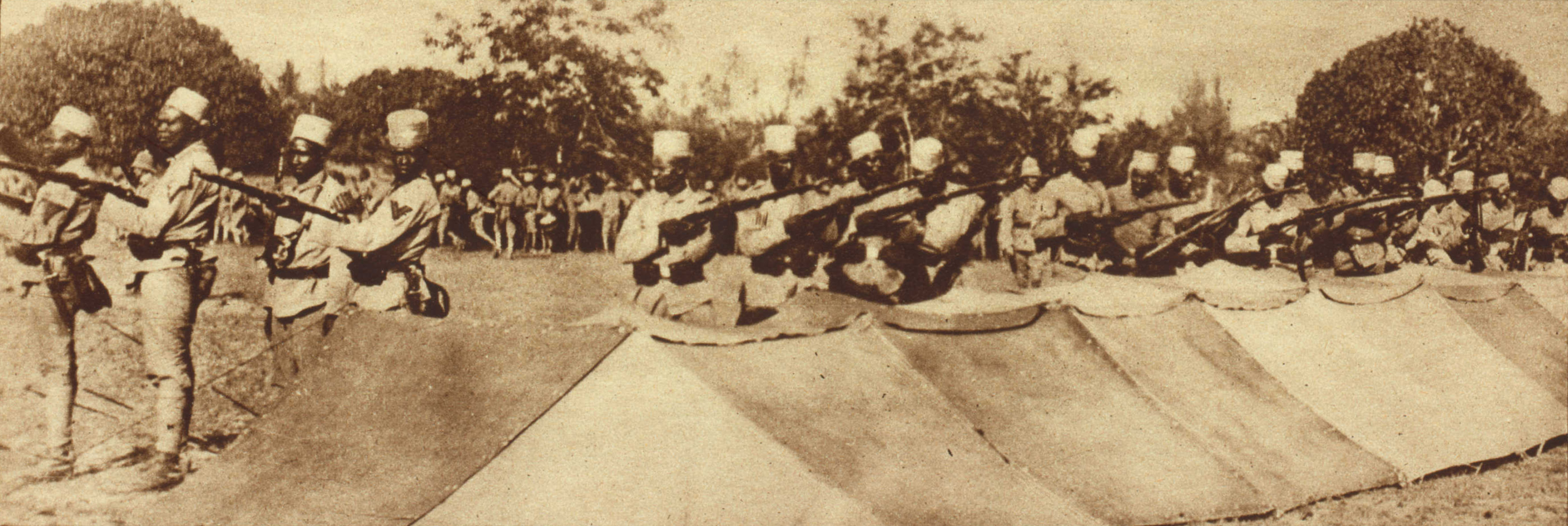
German native troops in Cameroon

The impact of the European war was substantial in Senegal and other French African colonies. Many of the soldiers had volunteered, but the French also resorted to extensive conscription in its territories. Many of the African soldiers found army life in Europe comparatively more egalitarian than civilian life under the colonial regimes of their homelands. The mixing of African troops with troops and civilians from other races however often made colonial regimes nervous. In 1918 for example, South Africa, forced to earlier deploy armed Africans to cover manpower shortages, removed its black troops from France, because "blacks in the French front were contaminated with foreign notions about race relations and other social grievances." The French employed a number of high-ranking black soldiers, such as Sosthene Mortenol, Commander of the Air Defenses of Paris. The exigencies and shared dangers of war also seemed to have created, in measure, more mutual understanding and freer communication between Africans and Europeans, although this did not translate immediately into a more just order in their homeland territories. Ironically, the last troops to surrender in World War I were the black soldiers fighting for Germany in East Africa.

The British made use of Africans troops in Europe primarily as labor and transport troops. One such group of Africans bound for France, part of the South African Native Labour Corps (SANLC), met a sudden end in a 1917 maritime incident, that sparked sympathy throughout South Africa. Their transport, the SS Mendi was struck by another ship, the Darro, which was sailing without warning lights or signals, and made no attempt to pick up the survivors. Their chaplain, Reverend Isaac Dyobha, is reported to have rallied the doomed troops on deck for one final muster, referencing old warrior traditions as the waves closed in:

Be quiet and calm, my countrymen. What is happening now is what you came to do...you are going to die, but that is what you came to do. Brothers, we are drilling the death drill. I, a Xhosa, say you are my brothers...Swazis, Pondos, Basotho...so let us die like brothers. We are the sons of Africa. Raise your war-cries, brothers, for though they made us leave our assegais in the kraal, our voices are left with our bodies.

— Isaac Dyobha, Mike Boon (2008). The African Way: The Power of Interactive Leadership. Struik Publishers, 2007. pp. 91–96

=== The Second Italian-Ethiopian War: 1935–36 ===
African-American pilot John C. Robinson was head of the Ethiopian Air Force during the Italian invasion. Numbering only 20 unarmed planes, the force could do little against modern Italian aircraft. Skilfully using the mountain ranges and cloud cover, Robinson however managed to fly numerous reconnaissance missions before the Ethiopian defeat.

The Italo-Ethiopian War (1935–36), saw Ethiopia's defeat by the Italian armies of Benito Mussolini. Ethiopia (Abyssinia), which Italy had unsuccessfully tried to conquer in the 1890s, was in 1934 one of the few independent states in a European-dominated Africa. A border incident between Ethiopia and Italian Somaliland that December gave Benito Mussolini an excuse to intervene. Ethiopian Emperor Haile Selassie I pulled all forces back 20 miles (32 km) from the border so as not to give the Duce any reason for aggression, but to no avail. Rejecting all arbitration offers, the Italians invaded Ethiopia on October 3, 1935. The Ethiopians were poorly armed with antiquated artillery, obsolete firearms, little armor, and some 20 outmoded planes. The Italians had over 200,000 troops in place, well equipped with modern arms for air and ground fighting.

Under Generals Rodolfo Graziani and Pietro Badoglio, the invading forces steadily pushed back the ill-armed and poorly trained Ethiopian army, winning a major victory near Lake Ascianghi (Ashangi) on April 9, 1936, and taking the capital, Addis Ababa, on May 5. Italian operations included the use of hundreds of tons of mustard gas, banned previously by the Geneva Convention. The nation's leader, Emperor Haile Selassie, went into exile. In Rome, Mussolini proclaimed Italy's king Victor Emmanuel III emperor of Ethiopia and appointed Badoglio to rule as viceroy. In response to Ethiopian appeals, the League of Nations had condemned the Italian invasion in 1935 and voted to impose economic sanctions on the aggressor. The sanctions remained ineffective because of general lack of support, and because they excluded key war-making material- iron, coal, steel and most critically, oil. Strangely, aluminum, a metal that Italy had in plenty, and even exported, was on the list of sanctions that supposedly punished Italy. Although Mussolini's aggression was viewed with disfavour by the British, the other major powers had no real interest in opposing him. One historian notes that Britain could have starved the Italian war machine to a halt simply by closing the Suez Canal to the Duce, but while issuing public statements condemning Italy, the British government took no real action. During the invasion, senior British and French officials drafted the Hoare-Laval pact which would partition the country, handing three-fifths of Ethiopia to the Italians. Press leaks created public outrage that canceled the pact. Less than a year after the Italian invasion, the League voted to remove sanctions against Italy.

The war ultimately gave substance to Italian imperialist claims, and contributed to international tensions between the fascist states and the Western democracies. It also sounded the death knell of the League of Nations as a credible institution according to some historians. These outcomes were to eventually culminate in World War II.

=== World War II ===
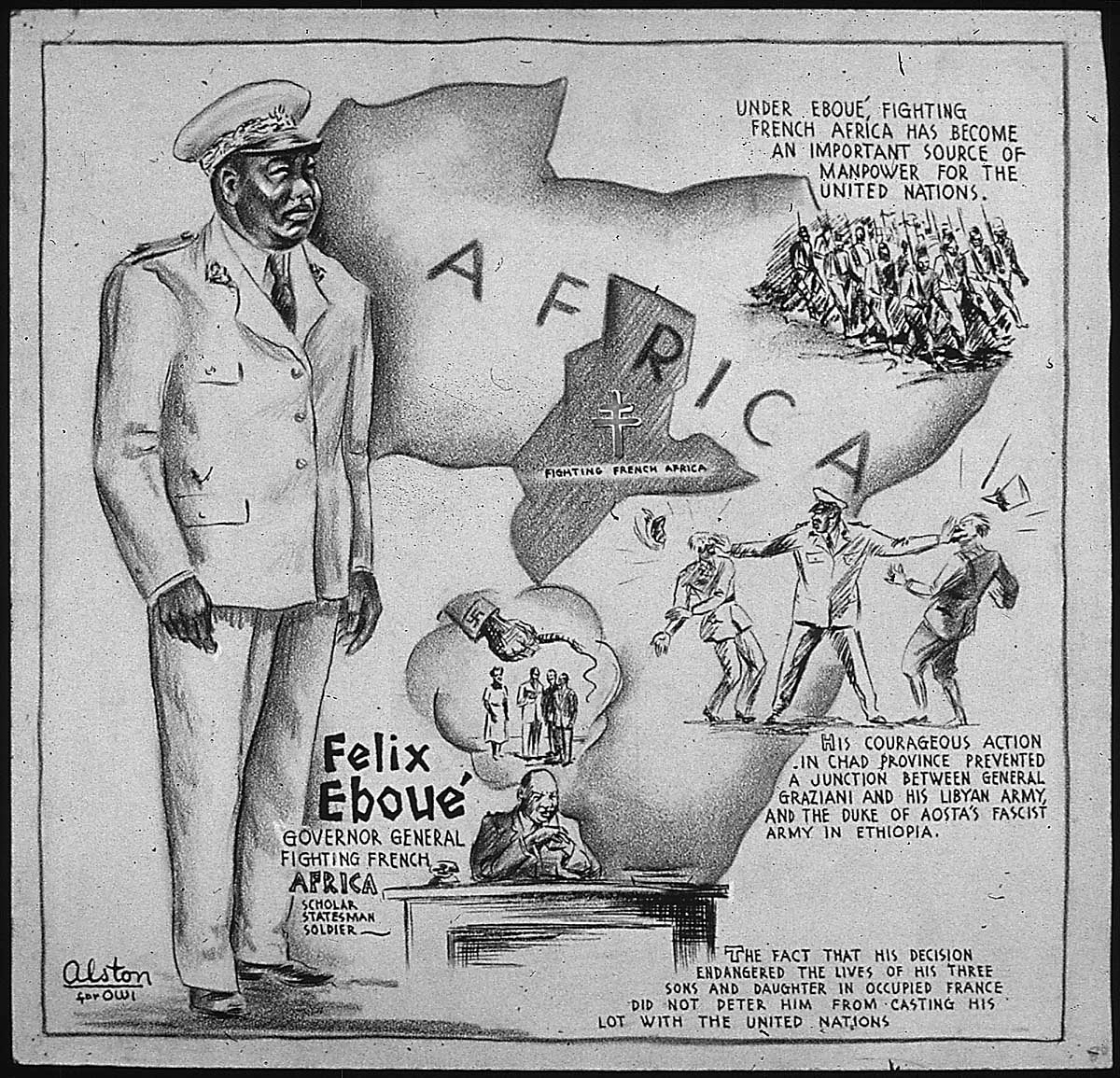
Black governor Felix Eboue was instrumental in transferring fighting men and resources of Chad and equatorial Africa to de Gaulle's Free French Forces. This 1943 illustration details his involvement.

Numerous Africans participated in World War II with black troops from France's colonial domains making up the bulk of the non-Europeans. Senegalese (sometimes a generic name for black troops from French colonies) put up a stiff fighting resistance against the Nazis during the great German Blitzkrieg into France. These, African troops were also to form a large part of the Free French Forces that maintained French resistance under Charles de Gaulle, outside the continent. In Africa, Felix Eboue, a black colonial administrator, was instrumental in rallying the territory of Chad for the Free French, adding thousands of fighting troops and masses of equipment to de Gaulle's cause. Other colonial formations were made up of troops from north Africa. As the Germans were beaten back, African troops made up the bulk of the initial forces that participated in the liberation of France during 1944, including supporting the French crossing of the Rhine.

The British colonies mostly deployed African troops in both Africa and Asia. Thousands of white South Africans and Rhodesians saw service in the Middle East and the Mediterranean, while black soldiers were assigned to both logistics and support formations. Some black regiments however did see combat, such as the King's African Rifles in the conquest of Madagascar from Vichy France in 1942, and the thousands of men of two West African divisions that fought with the British 14th Army against the Japanese in Burma.

==== Destabilizing effects of WWII among colonial soldiers ====
World War II was to have a profound effect on attitudes and developments in the African colonies. Dissatisfaction at inequities under colonial administration developed and had significant effects as the de-colonization/liberation era approached. As various colonial reports note:

"Most of the thousands of Africans who became soldiers had never been out of their native lands. On active service, despite the dangers and hardships, they were well fed and clothed, and comparatively well paid. Many of them learned to read newspapers listen to wireless bulletins and to take an interest in world affairs. They learned to see their own countries in perspective, from the outside. On their return home, many of them became dissatisfied with conditions which were not so attractive as army life in countries more developed than their own... Such Africans, by reason of their contacts with other peoples, including Europeans, had developed a political and national consciousness. The fact that they were disappointed at conditions on their return, either from specious promises made before demobilization or a general expectancy of a golden age for heroes, made them the natural focal point for any general movement against authority."

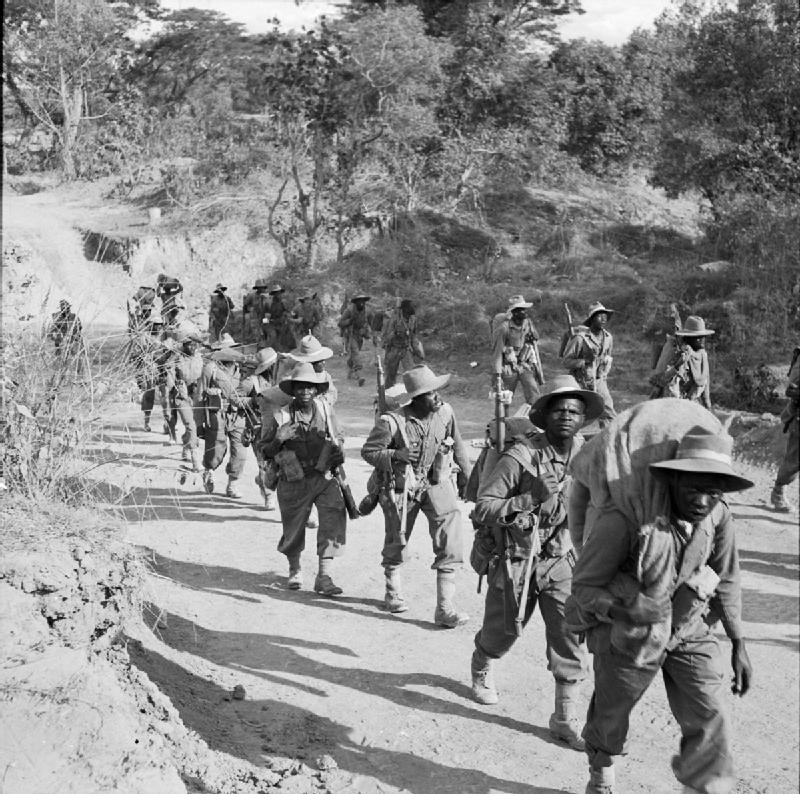
African Troops in Burma during the Second World War

==== More brutal treatment of black troops ====
Some WWII historians hold that black troops in France during the Western Campaign of 1940 were singled out for more brutal treatment by Nazi forces, even after making allowances for victor's anger at the steadfast resistance of the Negro units, who, as some German reports noted, "fought tenaciously, the blacks especially used every resource to the bitter end, defended every house.. to overcome the last Senegalese we had to kill them one by one."

"Blitzkrieg's real victor in 1940 was National Socialism. Hitler celebrated the successes of May and June in Nazi terms: as a triumph of will, informed by a consciousness of martial superiority that in turn depended on the racial superiority evoked and refined by the Third Reich. In that context, blitzkrieg played a central, arguably essential role in the "exterminatory warfare” that was Nazi Germany's true contribution to modern war making. Some forewarning was given by the treatment of the West African troops the French deployed in large numbers during the campaign's second half. The atrocities had historical roots: fear and resentment generated by French use of African "savages” in 1870 and 1914-18... After all allowances are made there is nevertheless no question that German soldiers, including men from the mobile divisions, disproportionately refused quarter to black combatants, disproportionately singled out black prisoners for brutal treatment including large-scale executions in non-combat situations, and justified themselves on racial grounds." (Dennis Showalter - Hitler's Panzers_ The Lightning Attacks that Revolutionized Warfare)

While the post-surrender killings were not ordered as part of official Nazi regime policy, archival documents indicate that the German army massacred several thousand black POWs belonging to units drafted in France's West African colonies, amid the background of a long-running propaganda campaign identifying African as sub-human racial enemies. Some researchers hold that the massacres represent a significant link in the Nazis' progressive racial radicalization of the war. While white British and French POWs were generally treated according to the Geneva Convention, not so the blacks, who were separated out from whites, North Africans and other colonial soldiers for special abuse. Massacres of the black POWs occurred in several different places, with some killings of a hundred at a time. Massacres did not just take place with POWs, but with wounded Africans on the battlefield, such as after African troops had recaptured Aubigny in a counterattack, but were later driven out. Some French reports claim an "indescribable rage" of German troops when they fought the black units, with no quarter given, compared to the white, a pattern contributing to far higher casualty rates among the Negro units than other French forces. Such indicators of racialization began with the casual killing of captured Polish and African "Untermensch" in 1939 and 1940, and continued into the deliberate mass murder of millions of Soviet POWs after 1941, which was sanctioned as state policy.

== Decolonization ==
=== Northern Africa ===
- Algerian War
- Perejil Island crisis

=== Eastern Africa ===
- Mau Mau Uprising
- Eritrean War of Independence

=== Western Africa ===
- Ifni War
- Green March
- Guinea-Bissau War of Independence

=== Central Africa ===
- Congo Crisis

=== Warfare in Southern Africa ===
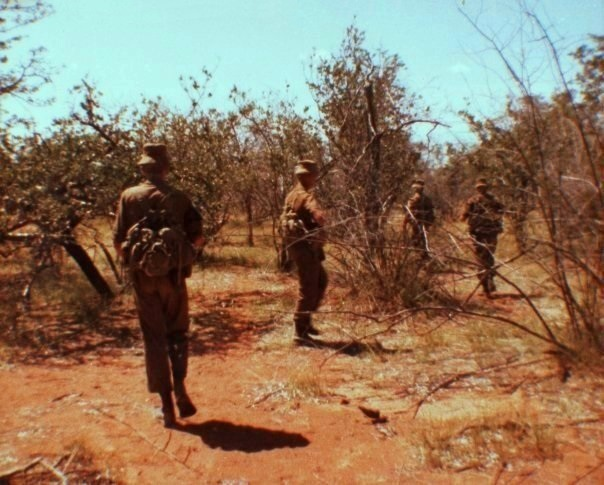
South African paratroops on border patrol. South Africa fought a long and bitter counter-insurgency conflict in Namibia from the late 1960s to 1989.

- Angolan War of Independence
- Mozambican War of Independence
- Rhodesian Bush War
- South African Border War
- Malagasy Uprising

=== Coups and counter-coups ===
1952

- Egyptian Revolution in 1952.

1960

- Force Publique mutiny in the Congo.
- Katanga secedes from the Congo.
- South Kasai secedes from the Congo.

1961

- Overthrow and arrest of Patrice Lumumba by Mobutu Sese Seko.

1963

- Military coup in Togo.

1964

- Simba Rebellion in the Congo.

1965

- Mobutu Sese Seko launches a successful second coup in the Congo.
- Houari Boumédienne seizes power in Algeria.

1966

- First Kisangani Mutiny in the Congo.
- Jean-Bédel Bokassa stages the a coup in the Central African Republic.

1967

- Second Kisangani Mutiny in the Congo.
- Military officers in Ghana attempt an unsuccessful coup d'etat (code named Operation Guitar Boy) that results in the assassination of Lieutenant General Emmanuel Kwasi Kotoka.
- Yakubu Gowon comes to power through a coup in Nigeria.

1969

- Muammar al-Gaddafi, a Lieutenant Colonel in the Libyan army, stages a coup to oust king Idris of Libya and installs himself as "Leader and Guide of the Revolution."
- Military coup in Somalia
- Military coup in the Sudan.

1970s – warfare in southern Africa

1971

- Idi Amin seizes power through a coup in Uganda.

1972

- Ignatius Kutu Acheampong overthrows the democratically elected government of Ghana.

1974

- The Derg, a communist military junta, seizes power in Ethiopia.

1975

- French mercenary Bob Denard deposes Ahmed Abdallah of the Comoros.
- Murtala Mohammed seizes power from Yakubu Gowon in Nigeria.
- A coup in Chad overthrows the government of François Tombalbaye.

1976

- A failed coup in Nigeria results in the death of Murtala Mohammed and the rise to power of Olusegun Obasanjo.

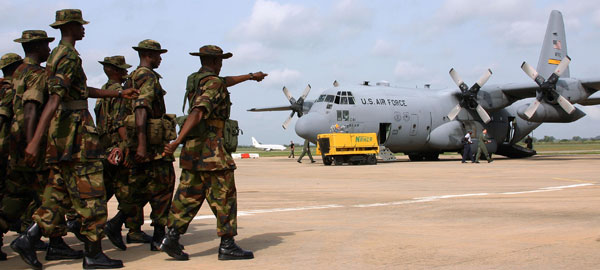
Nigerian troops with a US C-130 Hercules

1979

- Flight Lieutenant Jerry John Rawlings seizes power in Ghana.

1980

- Coup by Master Sergeant Samuel Doe in Liberia.
- Coup in Guinea Bissau.

1981

- Kukoi Sanyang leads a failed coup attempt in The Gambia.
- Jerry John Rawlings leads a second coup in Ghana.
- Failed coup attempt by mercenary Mike Hoare in the Seychelles.
- The Zimbabwe People's Revolutionary Army launches the 1981 Entumbane Uprising.

1982

- Members of the Kenyan Air Force lead a failed coup attempt in that country.

1983

- Military coup in Nigeria. Second republic president Shagari overthrown; Muhammadu Buhari takes power.

1984

- Cameroonian Palace Guard Revolt
- Maaouya Ould Sid'Ahmed Taya raise to power in Mauritania after a coup that overthrow the president Mohamed Khouna Ould Haidalla.

1985

- Military coup in Uganda led by Bazilio Olara-Okello and Tito Okello.
- Military coup in Nigeria. Ibrahim Babangida replaces Muhammadu Buhari.

1987

- Bloodless coup in Tunisia led by Prime Minister General Zine El Abidine Ben Ali overthrows President Habib Bourguiba.

1990

- Samuel Doe is captured and killed by INPFL rebels in Liberia led by Prince Johnson.

1992

- Military coup in Algeria cancels elections and forces President to resign.

1994

- Military coup in The Gambia.

1999

- Military coup in Côte d'Ivoire.

2003

- Military coup in Central African Republic.
- Attempted coup in Mauritania.
- Military coup in São Tomé and Príncipe.
- Military coup in Guinea-Bissau.

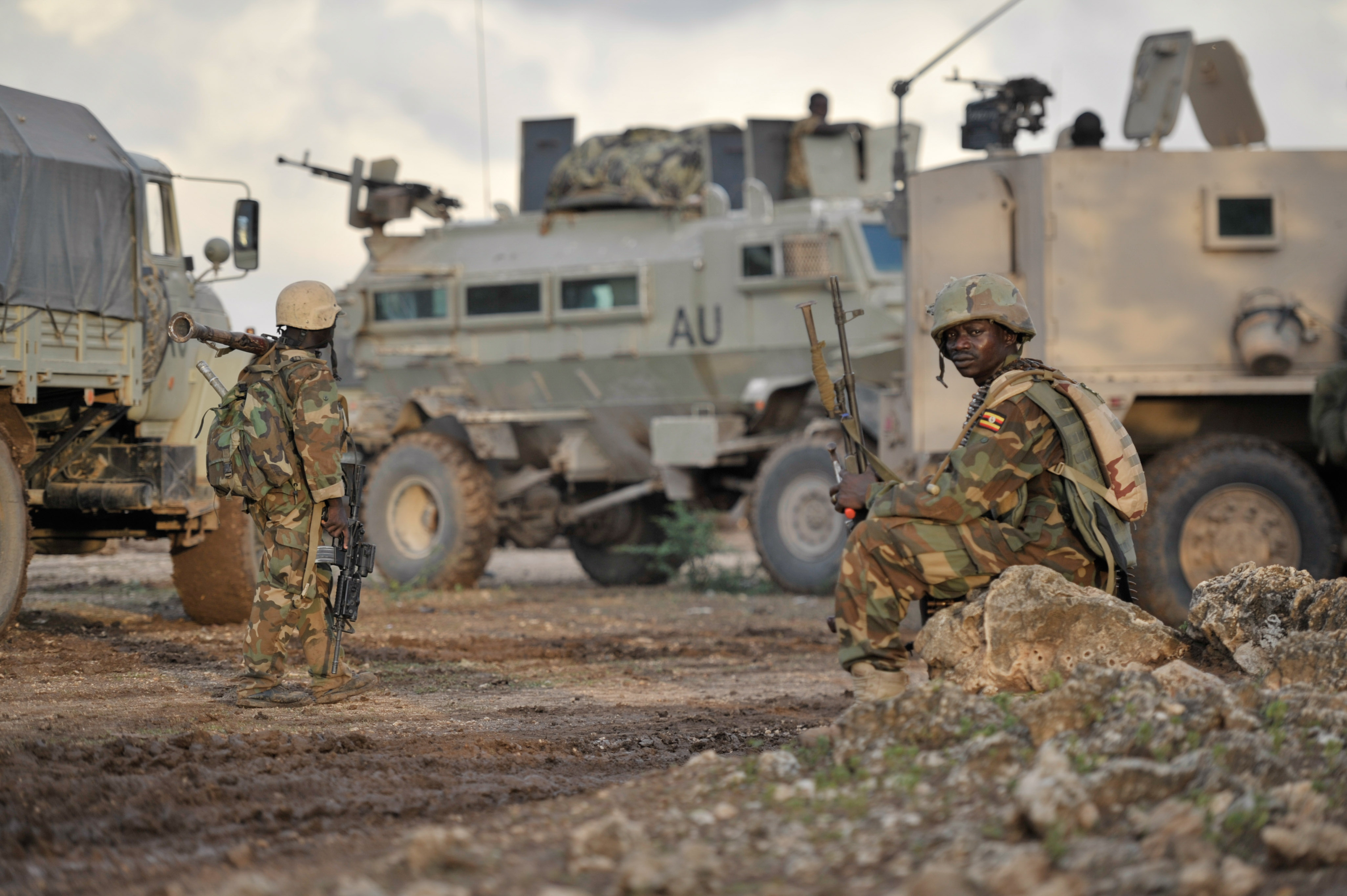
African Union peacekeepers during combat operations in Somalia.

2004

- Attempted coup in the Democratic Republic of Congo.
- Failed coup d'état in Chad against President Idriss Déby.
- Second attempted coup in the Democratic Republic of Congo (June).
- Attempted coup in Equatorial Guinea by South African mercenaries Nick du Toit and Simon Mann.

2005

- Coup in Togo legalized by parliamentary vote but unrecognized by international community.
- A military coup in Mauritania overthrows President Maaouya Ould Sid'Ahmed Taya. A new government is set up by a group of military officers headed by Ely Ould Mohamed Vall. The group formed the Military Council for Justice and Democracy to act as the governing council of the country.

2006

- The United Front for Democratic Change allegedly attempted to instigate a military coup in Chad to overthrow President Idriss Déby.
- The Malagasy Popular Armed Forces allegedly attempt a military coup in Madagascar against President Marc Ravalomanana.
- The military of Côte d'Ivoire claims to foil a coup attempt targeting President Laurent Gbagbo.

2008

- A military coup in Mauritania involving the seizure of the president, prime minister, and interior minister after the sacking of several military officials and a political crisis in which 48 MPs walked off the job and a vote of no confidence in cabinet.

2013

- The 2013 Egyptian coup d'etat overthrew president Mohammed Morsi.

== The post-Cold War era ==
=== Rise of asymmetric warfare and the "technicals" generation ===
With the exception of a handful of nations such as Egypt and South Africa, most modern defense forces in Africa are comparatively small and lightly armed, although many have a limited number of heavy weapons such as older main battle tanks. The post-colonial era however has also seen the emergence of numerous non-state military forces, such as terrorists, rebel guerilla organizations, ethnic gangs, and local warlords with various political platforms. Such non-state actors add to the instability of the African situation, and the growth of asymmetric warfare and terrorism makes the military challenges in Africa more acute.

The military landscape that these asymmetric forces operate in has been shaped by political instability and the massive introduction of inexpensive arms, such as the Chinese and Russian variants of the AK-47, rocket-propelled grenades, light mortars, and various multiple rocket launchers. The traditional mobility of the horse and camel is diminished from earlier times, but the rise of the technical, a pickup truck fitted with an individual crew-served weapon, has brought a comparative degree of mobility and firepower to fighting organizations within Africa, both military and paramilitary. While unable to match conventional armies openly in intensity of firepower and armor, the technicals and the weapons described above can cause significant harm when local light infantrymen fight on interior lines, and can deter the sustained intervention of foreign forces.

One illustration of the continued relevance of lightly armed Third-World forces operating on their own ground is the 1993 American intervention in Somalia. Local militiamen downed two Sikorsky UH-60 Black Hawks with RPG-7s and killed 18 elite Army Rangers. Although Somali losses in the encounter were staggering and the Rangers carried out their assigned objectives, the affair prompted the United States to withdraw, ultimately leaving the field to the Somali defenders. Another tactically significant demonstration of today's African mobility was displayed in the Toyota War, which pitted an under-equipped and understrength Chadian army against 20,000 Libyan troops backed by 300 T-54/55 and T-62 tanks, thousands of armored personnel carriers, and Sukhoi Su-10 bomber aircraft. As one military analyst notes of the Chadian performance:

'In contrast, Chadian forces possessed nothing more sophisticated than a handful of older Western armored cars, and mostly relied on Toyota pick-up trucks mounting crew-served infantry weapons. The Chadians had no tanks, no APCs, no artillery, no air force, no infantry weapons heavier than the Milan antitank guided missile, and only the complicated and ineffectual Redeye shoulder-launched surface-to-air missile (SAM) for air defence, What's more, the Chadians did not operate their weaponry very well. Nevertheless, an army of as many as 20,000 Libyans was demolished by 10,000 Chadian regulars and 20,000 tribal militia during eight months of fighting."

Guerilla organizations, paramilitaries and other asymmetric elements also continue to make an important impact in local areas—threatening to overthrow local regimes as well as generating widespread misery and economic dislocation in various areas. Such patterns are not unique to Africa and are also seen in places such as the Balkans.

=== Major modern forces in Africa ===
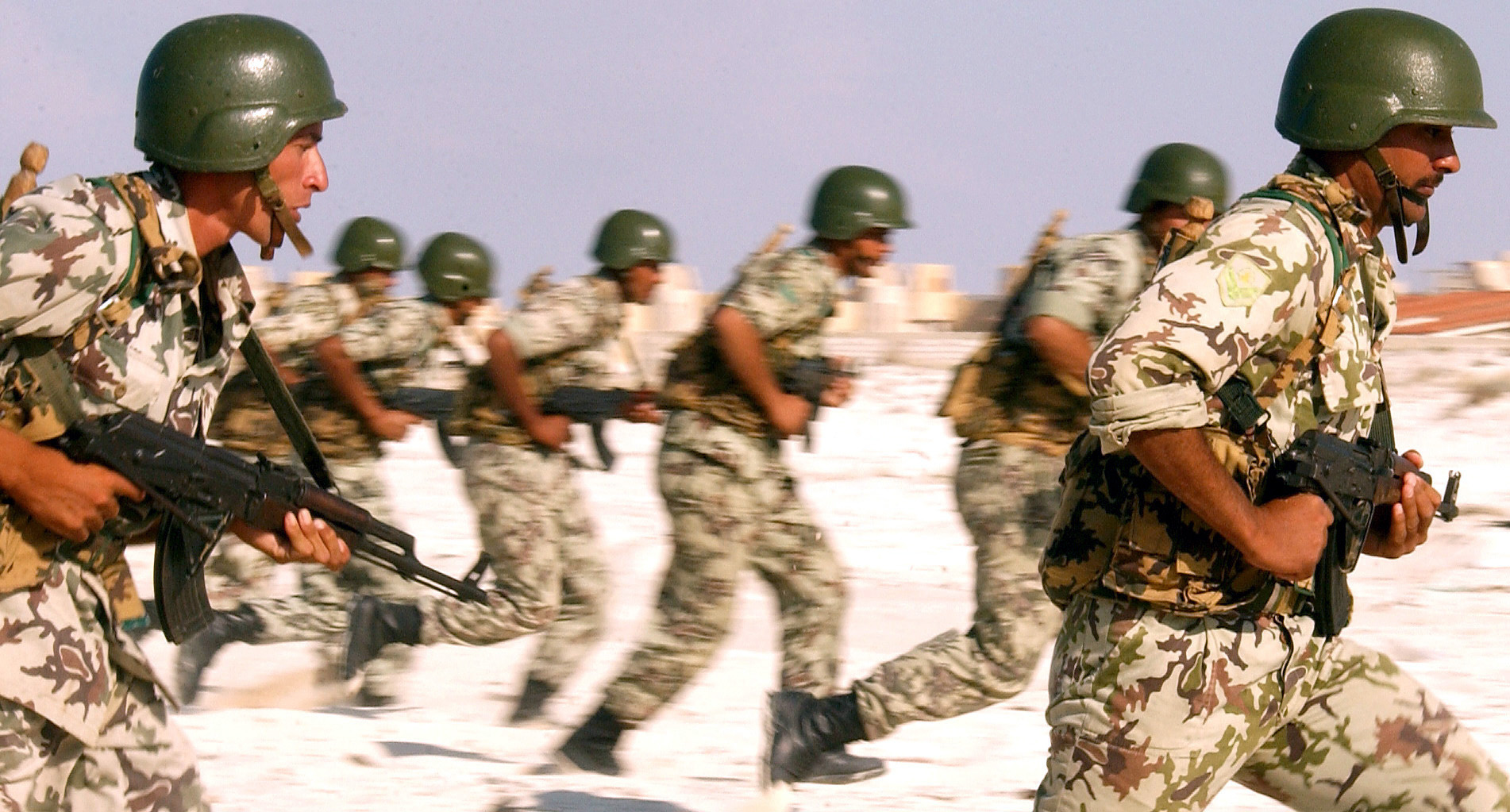
The impressive 1973 Suez Crossing by Egyptian forces illustrated a new sophistication by modern Africa-based armies.

Contrasting with the small scale, more fragmented pattern in many parts of the continent are the modern forces of such major powers as Egypt and South Africa. Well equipped for air and ground fighting, such regional powers represent a significant illustration of the growing capacities of Africa-based armies. The well-organized Canal Crossing of the Egyptians in the 1973 Yom Kippur War for example, is spoken of with respect by some Western military analysts and demonstrates the degree to which some continental forces have mastered modern technology.

However, detailed open-source evaluations of Egyptian military effectiveness, remain skeptical of any great capability leaps, arguing at length that the same problems that held the Egyptians back in 1956, 1967, and 1973 remain. The initial success at Suez for example, was comprehensively beaten back by the Israelis, first in the Sinai and then in the Battle of the Chinese Farm, leading to the cutting off of the Egyptian Third Army. Compared to previous Egyptian performances however, the Suez crossing represented a step forward, and showed an increasing sophistication on the battlefield.

Further south, Somalia in July 1977 initiated the Ogaden War with Barre's government trying to incorporate the predominantly Somali-inhabited Ogaden region in Ethiopia into a Pan-Somali Greater Somalia. The Somali national army invaded the Ogaden and was successful at first, capturing most of the territory. But the invasion reached an abrupt end with the Soviet Union's sudden shift of support to Ethiopia and was forced to retreat with almost the entire communist world siding with Ethiopia. Somalia's initial friendship with the Soviet Union and later partnership with the United States enabled it to build the fourth largest army in Africa.

While some fighting forces such as those maintained by South Africa have already been recognized for their professional competence and operational record, intermediate nations like Ethiopia also grow increasingly more sophisticated, adding to dynamic patterns of change and transformation illustrated from the earliest times on the continent, to the present.

=== 21st century military challenges ===
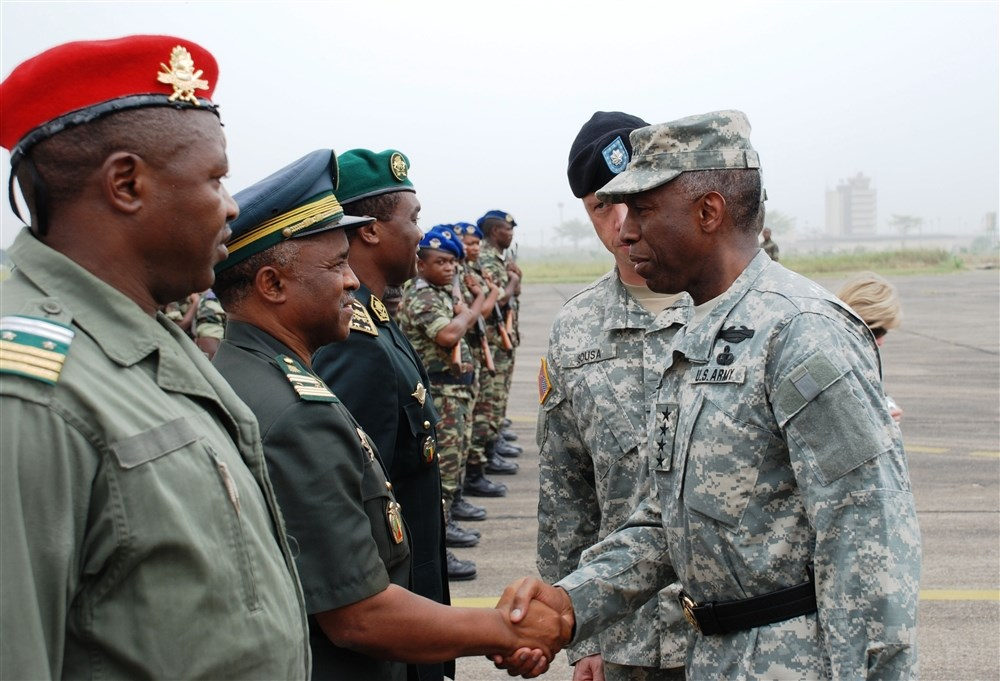
The large number of international military efforts in Africa has raised questions as to their efficacy.

The military challenge in Africa is huge in the post-Cold War era. It is a continent covering some 22% of the world's land area, has an estimated population of some 800 million, is governed by 53 different states, and is made up of hundreds of different ethnicities and languages. According to a 2007 Whitehall Report, (The African Military in the 21st Century, Tswalu Dialogue), some issues affecting African militaries in the 21st century include:

- The continued need to build military proficiency and effectiveness
- The threat of rebellions, coups and the need for stability
- Unrealistic expectations by the West about what Africa should be doing about continental defence and security issues
- The relevance of West Point or Sandhurst style training and thinking to the African context
- The weak and fragmented nature of many collective security type arrangements – such as the AU (African Union) – weak clones of the NATO concept
- The challenge of terrorism asymmetric warfare and how African forces shape themselves to meet them
- The danger of giving militaries a bigger role in nation building and development. In Africa such activity touches on political power.
- The appropriateness of international peacekeeping forces and bureaucracies in parts of Africa, with the mixed record of UN peacekeeping in the Congo or Rwanda raising doubts about their efficacy

=== Future of African military systems ===
==== Theme of modernization ====
Some writers argue that military activities in Africa after 1950 resemble somewhat the concept of a "frontiersman" – that is, warriors from numerous small tribes, clans, polities, and ethnicities seeking to expand their lebensraum – "living space" or control of economic resources, at the expense of some "other." Even the most powerful military below the Sahara, South Africa, it is argued, had its genesis in the notions of lebensraum, and the struggle of warriors from tribes and ethnicities seeking land, resources and dominance against some defined outsider. The plethora of ethnic and tribal military conflicts in Africa after the colonial period- from Rwanda, to Somalia, to the Congo, to the apartheid state, is held to reflect this basic pattern. Others maintain that ethnic and tribal struggles, and wars over economic resources are common in European history, and military conflicts and development that these struggles aid or hinder can be seen as a reflection of the process of modernization.

==== Inspiration from the past in African military systems ====
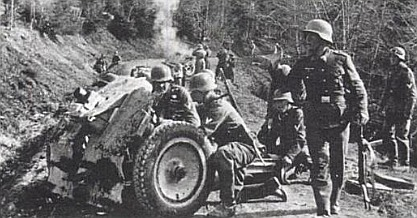
African troops fighting for France earned respect in some German reports for their tenacity during the Panzer Blitz of 1940. According to one German war document: ..the French fought tenaciously; the blacks especially used every resource to the bitter end, defended every house. To break them we had to use flame throwers, and, to overcome the last Senegalese we had to kill them one by one.

Yet other writers call for a renewed study of the past as inspiration for future reforms. They maintain that there has been a decline in African military systems from their indigenous foundations of the pre-colonial era, and early post colonial phases. In these eras, it is argued, African military forces generally conducted themselves "with honor" but future decades were to see numerous horrors and infamy. Peoples like the Asante, Zulu etc. fought hard and sometimes viciously, but this was within the context of their cultural understanding, at their particular time and place. There were no mass campaigns of genocidal extermination against others. Encounters with such African military forces it is held, often generated the universal code of respect between opposing warriors who had seen combat- one fighting man to another. An example of this can be seen in British writings such as post-mortem accounts of enemy leadership at the Battle of Amoaful against the Ashanti:

The great Chief Amanquatia was among the killed. Admirable skill was shown in the position selected by Amanquatia, and the determination and generalship he displayed in the defence fully bore out his great reputation as an able tactician and gallant soldier."

According to R. Edgerton, historian of many African conflicts:

"These armed men – and sometimes women – fought for territorial expansion, tribute and slaves; they also defended their families, kinsmen and their societies at large with their cherished ways of life. And when they fought, they typically did so with honor, sparing the elderly, women, and children... When colonial powers invaded Africa, African soldiers fought them with death-defying courage, earning such respect as warriors that they were recruited into the colonial armies not simply to enforce colonial rule in Africa but to fight for the European homelands as well. The French were so impressed by African warriors that they used them in the trenches of the western front in World War I, and African soldiers bore the brunt of German panzer attacks in World War II.. where they made a vivid impression on the far better equipped Germans.."

Likewise indigenous freedom forces fighting for independence indulged in savage fighting and some atrocities, but there were no wholesale massacres of tens of thousands. Indeed, some indigenous liberation forces went out of their way to spare combatants. It is claimed that this tradition of restraint and comparatively clean hands in the military sense, has been shattered and overshadowed by the bloody slaughters of civilians in numerous civil wars in Liberia or Sierra Leone, to mass genocidal slaughter of the latter 20th century in places like Rwanda and the Sudan. Added to these have been breaches of discipline seen in the large number of military coups, and assassinations afflicting the continent, military breaches that would have been unthinkable under fighting leaders of old like Shaka of the Zulu, or Opoku ware of the Asante. Too often it is argued, some of today's armies distinguish themselves by torture and murder of unarmed civilians, but show little appetite for real fighting against well-armed foes who can shoot back – a stark contrast with the warriors of olden time – like the Ethiopian, Zulu, Asante or Kongo hosts, who confronted credible opponents with much better technology, and still won. A challenge to African militaries of the future is to restore this tradition of discipline and honor, and transform themselves once more to "armies of the people", according to some writers:

"Africa's leaders of today and tomorrow must realize that the chiefs and kings who led Africa's many societies before European colonization took place were not dictators or tyrants who used armed forces to maintain their political power. The men and women, who fought their wars did so for many different reasons.. What they did not do was join with a chief, a prophet or a prince to seize political power and then hold it against the wishes of the people. They were the people, not the accomplices of autocrats."

== See also ==
- African military systems to 1800
- African military systems after 1800
- Military history of Africa
- Mali Empire
- Military history of the Mali Empire
- Kingdom of Ndongo
- Kingdom of Matamba
- Kingdom of Kongo
- Nzinga of Ndongo and Matamba
- Battle of Mbwila
- Battle of Zama

== Bibliography ==
- Barker, A.J. (1971). Rape of Ethiopia, 1936. New York: Ballantine Books
- Edgerton, Robert (2002) Africa's Armies: From Honor to Infamy Basic Books ISBN 0813342775
