= Portuguese raids in Senegambia =

15th-century raids

- Part of the Henrican explorations and early Transatlantic slave trade
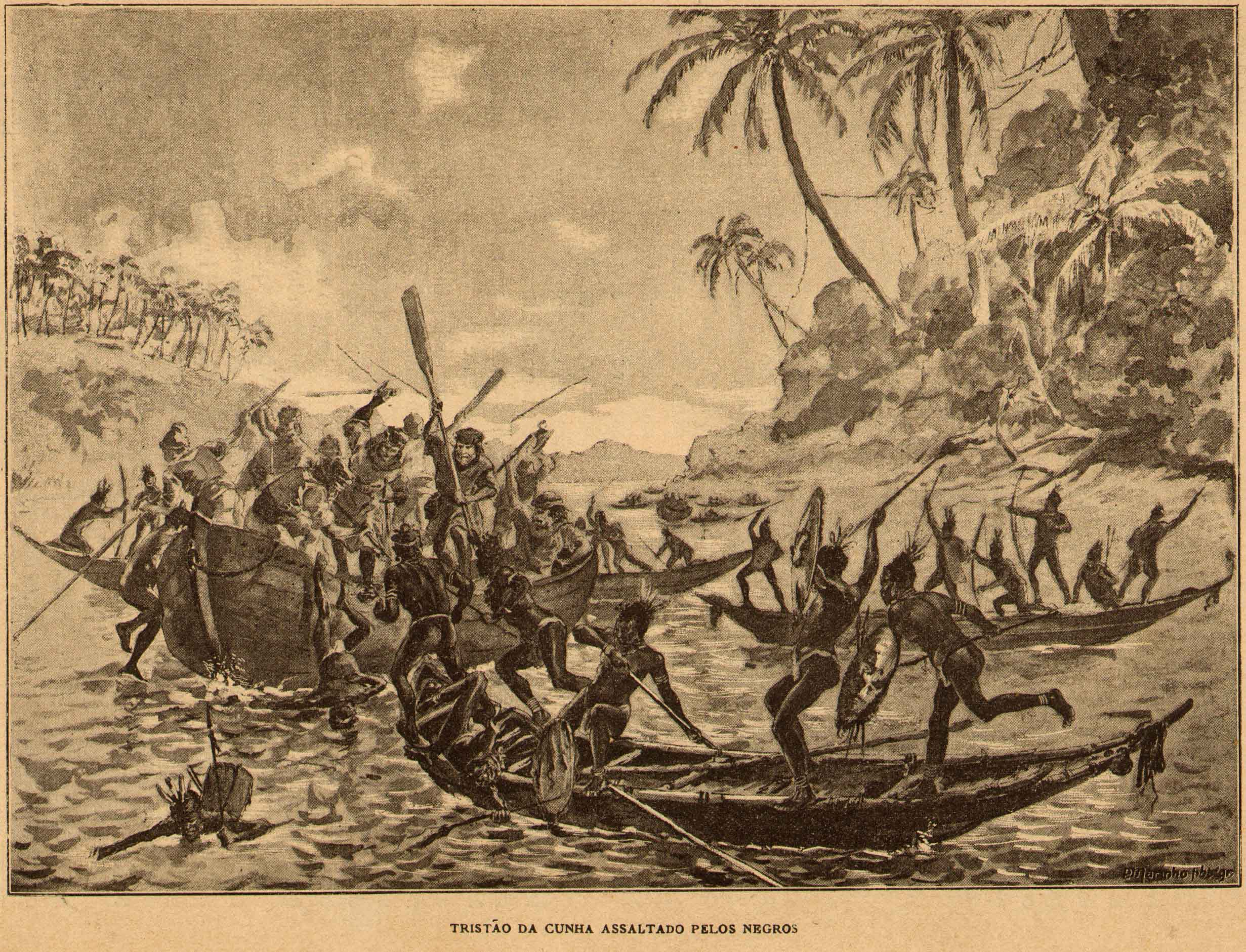
- "Nuno Tristão assaulted by the natives" — História de Portugal, popular e ilustrada c. 1899
Date	15th century
Location	Senegambia
Result	Peace treaty

Belligerents
Kingdom of Portugal	Jolof Empire; Mali Empire

Commanders and leaders
Henry the Navigator; Nuno Tristão †; Álvaro Fernandes (WIA); Vallarte the Dane †; Alvise Cadamosto	Local rulers

The Portuguese raids in Senegambia were a series of mid-15th century expeditions carried out by explorers and slave raiders in the service of Prince Henry of Portugal along the coasts of present-day Senegal and The Gambia.

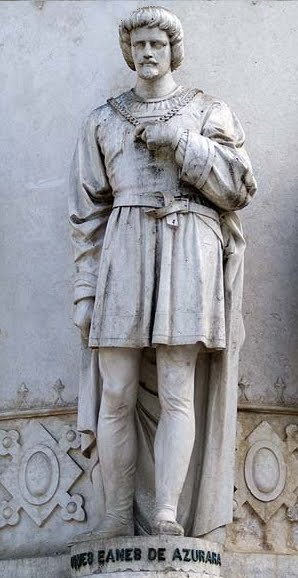
Gomes Eanes de Zurara, Portuguese chronicler who wrote the Crónica dos feitos da Guiné

Although these expeditions largely ended in failure, they marked the first steps in Portuguese expansion along the West African coast, a process that would eventually lead to its naval victory at Diu in 1509. At the same time, these encounters revealed the military organization and tactics of the Malian and Jolof empires, and that European naval superiority was limited.

== Background ==
The West African slave trade began under the patronage of Prince Henry of Portugal in the 1420s. However, it had already flourished between the 8th and 14th century CE, established by Muslim merchants. Over these six centuries, an estimated three to four million people had been enslaved.

From the mid-15th century, the Portuguese mounted voyages down the West African coast, searching for routes to India, Christian allies, trade relations and material goods. Yet, the desire for conquest, honor, plunder and glory grew among the participants of these expeditions.

In the region of Senegambia, two major African polities were relevant: the Mali Empire and Jolof Empire.

Mali by this time was in crisis and decline, having lost several provinces due to its weakness and the rise of the Songhai Empire, however, it still maintained control over the Gambia River. Meanwhile, Jolof was a rising confederacy of Senegalese city-states that had recently broken free from Mali.

These African polities possessed well-organised militaries, including infantry, archers with poisoned arrows, cavalry, war‑canoes and almadias that could operate on rivers and lagoons, effective against European caravels. Furthermore, Jolof was highly intolerant of foreign religions or people, determined to preserve its own authority in Senegal. This hostility, however, did not stop the Portuguese from trying, as Prince Henry justified these expeditions using the old Reconquista rhetoric as a "just war" and necessary for Christian conversion.

== Raids and Expeditions ==
=== Early attempts (1440s) ===
The initial expeditions were led by Gomes Pires and Dinis Dias. Both attempted to land on the coast but found the beaches defended by a large force of archers and infantry. The latter were equipped with iron throwing darts and spears described as having "seven or eight harpoon-like prongs", all of which, Pires noted, were poisoned with plants. Recognizing the risk of enslaving this population, the two opted to sail for safer waters and avoid conflict. However, Nuno Tristão meant to show they were wrong doing so.

=== Nuno Tristão (1446) ===
Nuno Tristão, a knight and personal friend of Prince Henry the Navigator, had previously participated in Portugal's first African slaving voyage in 1441. His early expeditions, which quickly followed and captured a total of 60 Africans, along with his success in raiding the undefended Moroccan and Mauritanian coasts, turned him into a national hero.

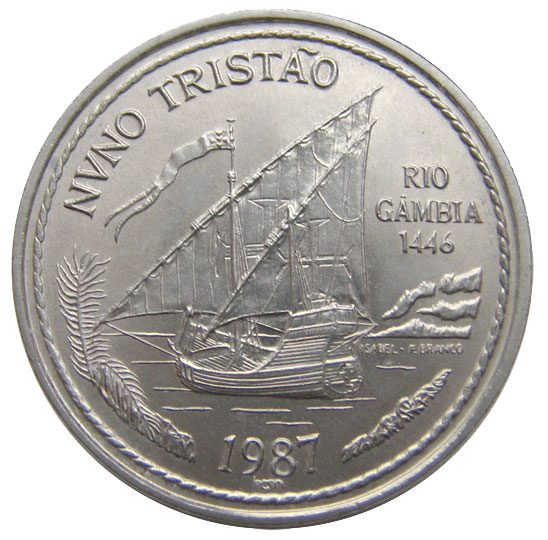
Coin of 100 Escudos of 1987, commemorating Nuno Tristão's voyage to the Gambia River, in 1446

In 1446, Tristão sailed past Cape Verde and entered a Senegalese river, identified as the Saloum, searching for what he called "the Land of the Blacks". Expecting no big resistance, he soon encountered twelve war-canoes, carrying around 70 to 80 archers. While surrounding Tristão's ships, one canoe landed on the bank, allowing archers to open fire with poisoned arrows. Two men aboard the caravel were hit, and, of the 24 wounded by arrows, 22 either died immediately or during the voyage home. Among the dead were Tristão and other young aristocrats: Diogo Machado, Estevão de Almeida, Duarte de Holanda and João Correia.

According to Gomes Eanes de Zurara, the survivors fled back to the caravel and eventually managed to reach Portugal. Although small in scale, this defeat had a significant psychological impact on the Portuguese nobility:

"Although the news of the death of Nuno Tristam caused in many people of our Kingdom a great fear of following up the war they had commenced; for the one party said to the other that it was a very doubtful matter to undertake fighting with men who so plainly carried death about with them."

=== Álvaro Fernandes (1447) ===
Despite this early failure, the Portuguese were not ready to abandon their efforts, and the following year, another of Henry's proteges, Álvaro Fernandes, sailed to Senegal. He sailed up the Cabo dos Mastos, (Note: Believed to be around Cabo Roxo, situated between Cape Verde and the mouth of the Saloum River.) a river different from Tristão's, perhaps believing he had avoided the territory where the knight was killed. However, he had not escaped the reach of the Jolof Empire. Jolof claimed control over nearly the entire coast of Senegal and held power over its rivers, chieftains, and people.

Fernandes's first expedition ashore found nothing but abandoned goats and elephant dung. His second attempt, further down the river, met a village whose local defense force "issued forth like men who showed they had a will to defend their houses". Fernandes supposedly killed the leader of this group in single combat, piercing him with his lance, then used the distraction to retreat to his caravel, with his men close behind him.

The next day, Fernandes ambushed and captured two women and a child outside the village, forcing them aboard the caravel, then attempted to sail further up the river in his boats. At this point, however, his passage was blocked by "four or five boats of Guineas prepared like men who would defend their land". Fernandes was not, in the words of Zurara, "desirous to try a combat with them, seeing the great advantage their enemies had, and especially because they feared the great peril that lay within the poison with which they shot".

Fernandes barely escaped back to his caravel, getting hit by an arrow in his leg as he did so. Aware of the poison's danger, Fernandes immediately pulled the arrow out, then attempted to treat the wound with urine and olive oil. He survived, though likely due to a small dose, since "his health was in very troublesome case, for in certain days he was in the very act of passing away from life".

Fernandes's crew loaded him back on the caravel and retreated from the river, deciding to try their luck further down the coast. They were still in Jolof territory, and the West Africans' response to their presence was escalating.

When they reached a bay, Fernandes' men decided to go ashore, hoping to salvage anything from their failed venture. Before they reached the beach, however, "they saw coming toward them full 120 Guineas, some with shields and assegais, others with bows". His crew rowed back to the ship, using their leader's illness as an excuse. They gave up their search for slaves and loot and headed back to Portugal.

=== Vallarte the Dane (1447/8) ===
In 1447 or 1448, the Portuguese launched another attempt, this time led by a caravel captained by "Vallarte the Dane". Zurara described Vallarte as a member of the King of Denmark's household and a dedicated Christian eager to join Portugal's war against the African "Moors".

Sailing past Cape Verde, Vallarte met with a local aristocrat named Guitanye, who initially seemed friendly. Guitanye informed the Portuguese that he could not arrange a meeting with his "King Boor" because the King was currently engaged in a neighboring war. Later, while Guitanye was gone, Vallarte was lured ashore by an offer of alcohol, unaware that a large force was hidden nearby. A wave hit Vallarte's longboat, and, according to Zurara, "the Negroes hastened up very lustily and fell in a body on the boat, hurling their assegais". Of all the crew, only one survivor managed to swim back to the ship. Vallarte himself was either killed or captured. Seeing that nothing more could be done, Vallarte's second-in-command weighed anchor and set sail back to Portugal.

After this incident, the Portuguese shifted their approach of raiding for captives to establishing a system of commerce with the locals.

=== Alvise Cadamosto (1455-56) ===
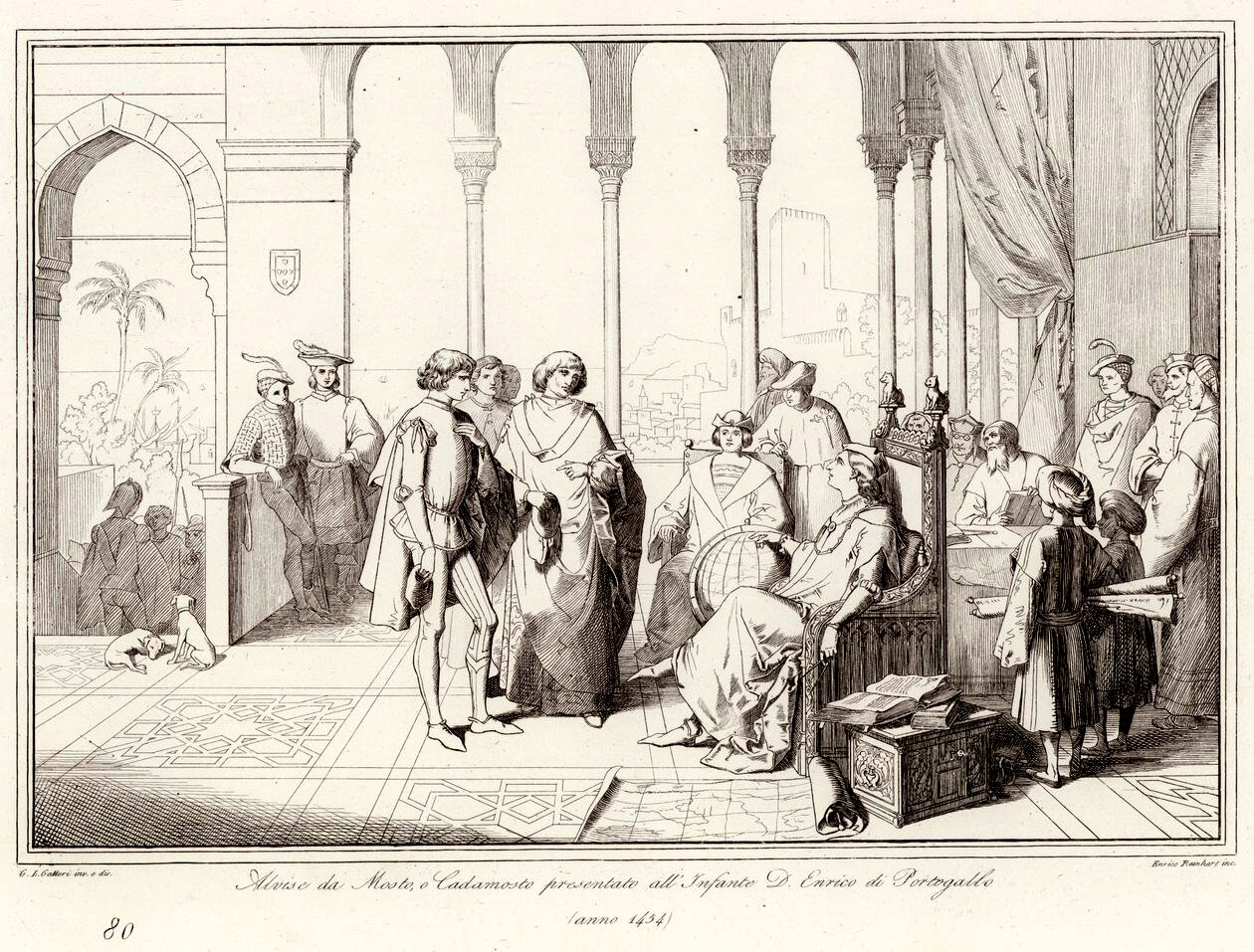
Depiction of Prince Henry enlisting Alvise Cadamosto – Giuseppe Lorenzo Gatteri and Francesco Zanotto, 1863

In 1455, Alvise Cadamosto, a Venetian slave trader, was hired by the Portuguese and decided to venture where Tristão, Fernandes, and Vallarte had failed. Unlike his predecessors, Cadamosto did not travel alone, he met up with three other caravels, arriving off the Senegambian coast with a small fleet of four heavily armed ships.

While off Jolof, Cadamosto was careful to avoid aggression, and he successfully conducted business. He followed the same peaceful trading further down the coast with "Budomel", the ruler of the Jolof city-state of Kajoor.

Sailing past Cape Verde the following year, he entered the Gambia River mouth. As his caravels moved up the river, Cadamosto realized he was being watched by war-canoes. He later learned these boats were from the Gambian tributaries of the Mali Empire. The war-canoes, split into two groups, began closing in on the Portuguese fleet. Cadamosto counted fifteen war-canoes carrying between 130 and 150 Malian marines.

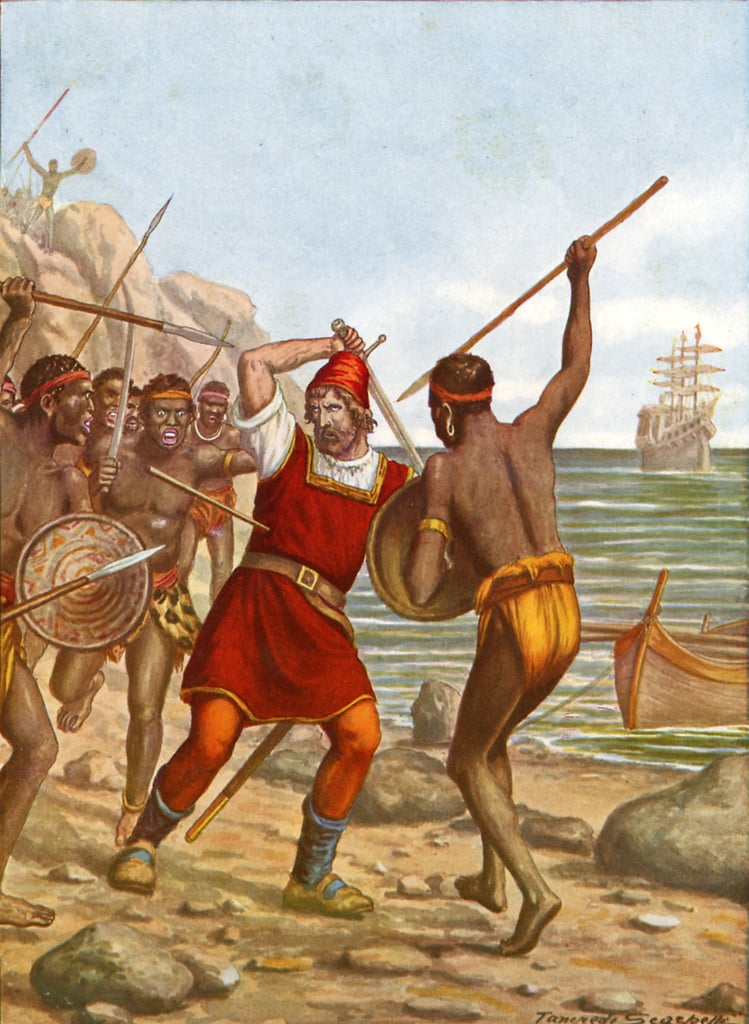
"Alvise Cadamosto killed by negroes" (historically false) — Tancredi Scarpelli, c. 1929

The Malians attacked first, and the Portuguese immediately returned fire with their cannons, though the damage was minimal. Although the Malians were initially shocked by the range and power of the European weapons, they did not retreat. They approached the smallest caravel from the rear and launched a boarding action, forcing Cadamosto's other ships to close in and fire cannons and crossbows at point blank range. The war-canoes were finally driven off, after which Cadamosto chained his ships together and dropped anchor, creating a defensive line. He tried to speak with the Malian commander, claiming his intentions were peaceful, but was told in return that the Malians believed he, and all other Christians, were cannibals who had come to kidnap and eat Africans. Cadamosto couldn't change their minds, making any negotiation impossible.

Despite this, Cadamosto and his commanders wanted to continue exploring the Gambia, but their sailors had had enough. Cadamosto ultimately left the Gambia having achieved little.

Cadamosto returned the next year, adopting the same peaceful stance he had used in Jolof. He successfully conducted business with the Gambians, learning they were subjects of the Mansa of Mali and that their marines were the ones who had forced his retreat the previous year.

Although written several years after his voyages, and only published in 1507, Cadamosto's account is generally considered credible and one of the most accessible amongst Guinea accounts. His judgments on Africans and Muslims are mostly non-moralizing, and with one comment, he identifies what the modern mind sees as a fundamental characteristic of Africa:

"I perceived quite clearly that these people are exceedingly poor (zente poverissima)".

=== Diogo Gomes and end of hostilities ===
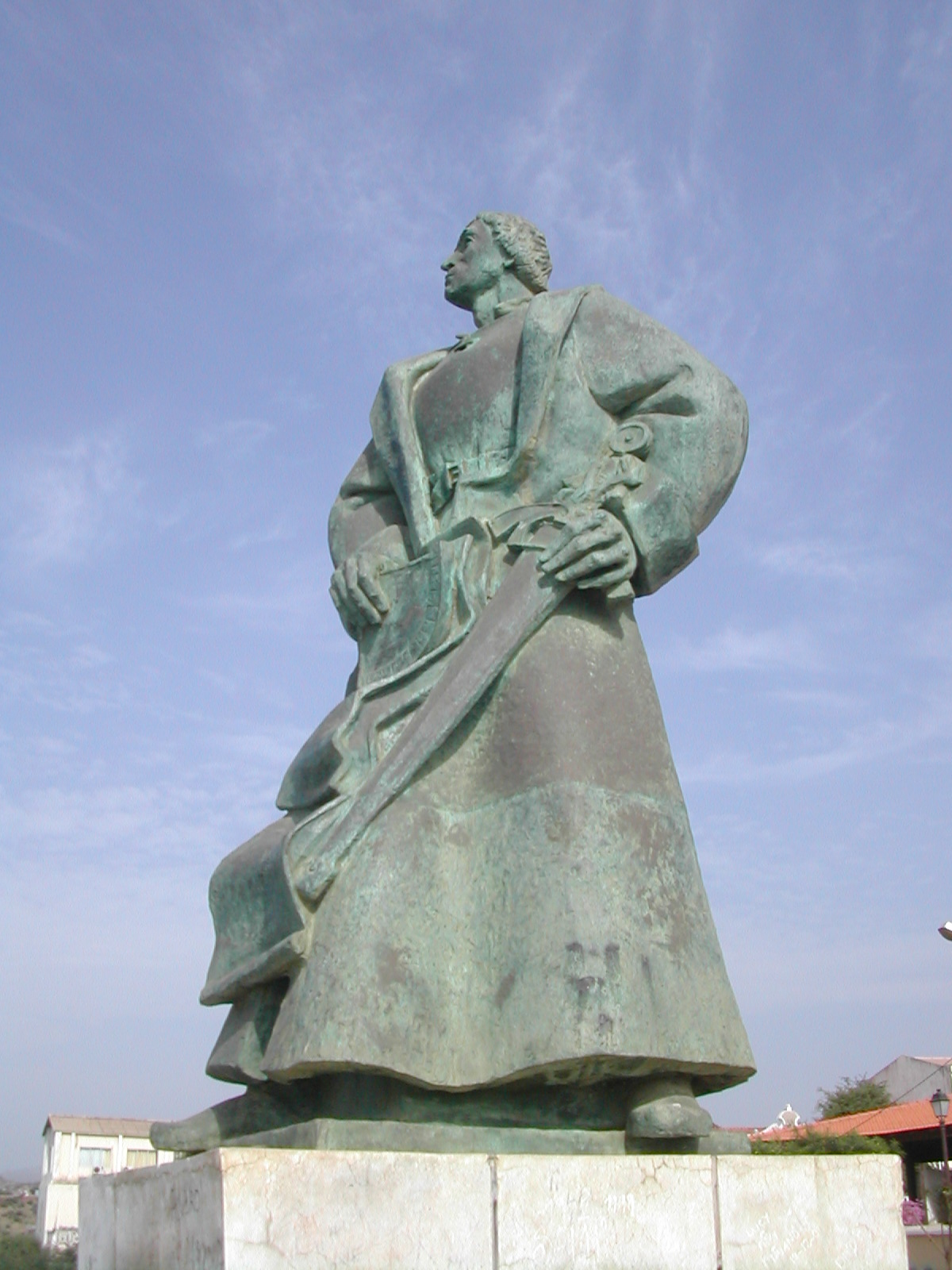
Statue of Diogo Gomes in Praia, Cape Verde

Trading in the Gambia and Senegal remained risky until the late 1450s, when Diogo Gomes arrived with orders from the Portuguese crown to formally end hostilities with the Jolof Empire and Mali Empire and set up normal trade. Gomes was successful, and Portuguese slave trading on the West African coast resumed, but slave raiding did not. The Portuguese had finally learned that challenging the West African powers only led to casualties, not profit.

== Aftermath ==
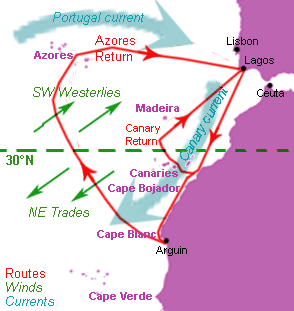
Progress of Portuguese exploration of the West African coast by 1460

By 1448, at the end of Zurara's chronicle, about fifty vessels had traveled beyond Bojador, having captured an estimated 927 slaves. This progress expanded significantly so that, by the time of Prince Henry the Navigator's death in 1460, the Portuguese had explored much of West Africa's coastline and rivers.

The newly discovered Cape Verde islands quickly became the administrative and commercial centre of trade along the Guinea coast. This initial exploration later led to further expeditions south under Afonso V and John II.

== Bibliography ==
- Winter, Cameron (May 8, 2023). "War‑Canoes and Poisoned Arrows: Great Jolof and Imperial Mali Against the Fifteenth‑Century Portuguese Slave Raids". Journal of African Military History. doi:10.1163/24680966-BJA10016.
- Mark, Peter (April 18, 2023). "Local African responses to the early slave trade trade in Upper Guinea, sixteenth to seventeenth centuries". Zeitschrift für kulturanthropologische Forschung. 68. doi:10.21248/paideuma.109.
- Ly-Tall, Madina (November 17, 1997). "Le déclin de l'empire du Mali (7)". Histoire générale de l'Afrique: L'Afrique du XIIe au XVIe siècle (PDF). UNESCO. ISBN 9232017105.
- Hair, P. E. H. (1994). "The Early Sources on Guinea". History in Africa. 21: 87–126. doi:10.2307/3171882. JSTOR 3171882.
- Tymowski, Michał (September 7, 2020). Europeans and Africans. BRILL. ISBN 9789004428508.
- Diffie, Bailey W. (1977). Foundations of the Portuguese empire, 1415-1580. Minneapolis: University of Minnesota Press. ISBN 978-0-8166-0782-2.
- Bennett, Herman L. (November 2005). ""Sons of Adam": Text, Context, and the Early Modern African Subject". Representations. 92 (1): 16–41. doi:10.1525/rep.2005.92.1.16.
