= Mahmud III =

Mansa of Mali

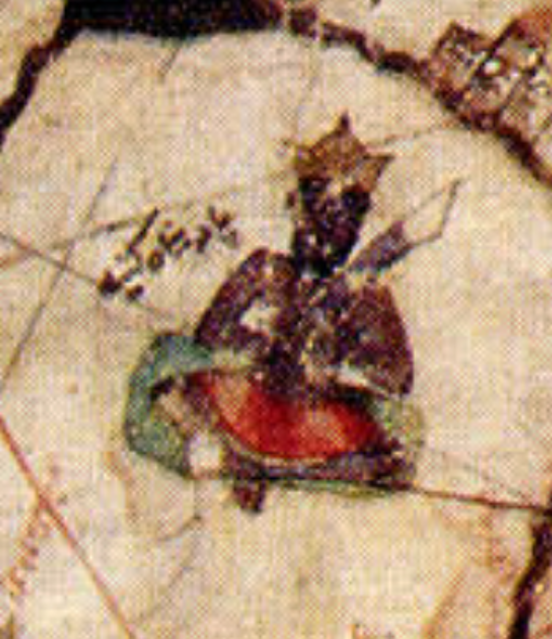
- "Ruler of Guinea" from Piri Reis' map (1513) Possible depiction of Mali ruler

Mansa of Mali
- Reign: 1496–1559
- Predecessor: Mahmud II (mansa)
- Dynasty: Keita
- Religion: Islam

Mansa Mahmud III, also known as Mamadou II, was mansa ("king of kings") of the Mali Empire during the 16th century, with the only firm date being that he was on the throne in 1534. He was the grandson of one of his predecessors, Mahmud II, but nothing is known of the Mansas who may have ruled in between them.

== Context ==
Songhai forces under the command of Askia Muhammad I defeated the Malian general Fati Quali in 1502 and seized the province of Diafunu. In 1514, the Denianke dynasty is established in Tekrur. It isn't long before the new kingdom of Great Fulo is warring against Mali's remaining provinces. To add insult to injury, the Songhai Empire seizes the copper mines of Takedda.

== Reign ==
In 1534, Mahmud III received a Portuguese envoy to the Mali court by the name of Peros Fernandes, just as his grandfather had done. The emperor asked for military support against the rising power of the Denianke dynasty of Futa Toro, who were attacking the critical gold-producing region of Bambouk.

Mansa Mahmud III's reign also saw the province of Kaabu become independent in 1537.

Mahmud III may have still been the ruling Mansa in 1545 when the Songhai sacked and briefly occupied the imperial capital.

== See also ==
- Mali Empire
- Keita Dynasty
