= History of Mauritania (1984–present) =

Aspect of Mauritanian history

In December 1984, Haidallah was deposed by Colonel Maaouya Ould Sid'Ahmed Taya, who, while retaining tight military control, relaxed the political climate. Ould Taya moderated Mauritania's previous pro-Algerian stance, and re-established ties with Morocco during the late 1980s. He deepened these ties during the late 1990s and early 2000s as part of Mauritania's drive to attract support from Western states and Western-aligned Arab states. Mauritania has not rescinded its recognition of Polisario's Western Saharan exile government and remains on good terms with Algeria. Its position on the Western Sahara conflict has been, since the 1980s, one of strict neutrality.

== 1984–1991 ==
Ordinance 83.127, enacted 5 June 1983, launched the process of nationalization of all land not clearly the property of a documented owner, thus abolishing the traditional system of land tenure. Potential nationalization was based on the concept of "dead land", property that has not been developed or on which obvious development cannot be seen. A practical effect was government seizure of traditional communal grazing lands.

In April 1986, the Manifesto of the Oppressed Black Mauritanian (Manifeste du négro-mauritanien opprimé), which documented discrimination against Mauritania's black populations in every sector of public life, was published by the African Liberation Forces of Mauritania (ex-FLAM; Force pour la Liberation Africaine de Mauritanie). In response, in September 1986, 30 to 40 black intellectuals suspected of involvement in the publication of the Manifesto were arrested and subjected to brutal interrogations. They were not allowed visitors until November 1987. In the meantime, the authorities cracked down on black communities, often using mass arrests as a form of intimidation.

In October 1987, the military government allegedly uncovered a tentative coup d'État by a group of black army officers, backed, according to the authorities, by Senegal. Fifty-one officers were arrested and subjected to interrogation and alleged torture. They were accused of "endangering the security of the State by participating in a conspiracy to overthrow the government and to provoke killing and devastation among the inhabitants of the country" and tried following a special summary procedure. Three of the officers arrested in October were sentenced to death; eighteen were sentenced to life imprisonment (including two who died in detention in 1988); nine were sentenced to twenty years; five were sentenced to ten years; three were given five years; six were given five-year suspended sentences with heavy fines; and seven were acquitted. None of those convicted were permitted to appeal.

The discord between conflicting visions of Mauritanian society as either black or Arab, again rose to the surface during the intercommunal violence that broke out in April 1989 (the "1989 Events"), when a Mauritania-Senegal border dispute escalated into violence between the two communities.

In villages of the South, blacks were indiscriminately expelled by security forces, who forced them to cross the Senegalese River to Senegal, taking their identity cards and their belongings. Those who resisted were imprisoned and sometimes executed.

In the larger towns and cities, the authorities targeted black civil servants, employees of private institutions, trade unionists, former political prisoners.

In October 1987, the Government allegedly uncovered a tentative coup d'état by a group of black army officers, backed, according to the authorities, by Senegal. Fifty-one officers were arrested and subjected to interrogation and torture.

Heightened ethnic tensions were the catalyst for the Mauritania–Senegal Border War, which started as a result of a conflict in Diawara between Moorish Mauritanian herders and Senegalese farmers over grazing rights. On 9 April 1989, Mauritanian guards killed two Senegalese.

Following the incident, several riots erupted in Bakel, Dakar and other towns in Senegal, directed against the mainly Arabized Mauritanians who dominated the local retail business. The rioting, adding to already existing tensions, led to a campaign of terror against black Mauritanians, who are often seen as 'Senegalese' by Bidha'an, regardless of their nationality. As low scale conflict with Senegal continued into 1990/91, the Mauritanian government engaged in or encouraged acts of violence and seizures of property directed against the Haalpularen ethnic group. The tension culminated in an international airlift agreed to by Senegal and Mauritania under international pressure to prevent further violence. The Mauritanian Government expelled tens of thousands of black Mauritanians. Most of these so-called 'Senegalese' had no ties to Senegal, and many have been repatriated from Senegal and Mali after 2007. The exact number of expulsions is not known but the United Nations High Commissioner for Refugees (UNHCR) estimates that, as of June 1991, 52,995 Mauritanian refugees were living in Senegal and at least 13,000 in Mali.

From November 1990 to February 1991, between 200 and 500 (depending on the sources) Fula and Soninke soldiers and/or political prisoners were executed by Mauritanian governmental forces. They were among 3,000 to 5,000 blacks – predominantly soldiers and civil servants – arrested between October 1990 and mid-January 1991. Some Mauritanian exiles believe that the number was as high as 4,000 on the basis of alleged involvement in an attempt to overthrow the government.

The government initiated a military investigation, and a law of amnesty was voted. In order to guarantee immunity for those responsible and to block any attempts at accountability for past abuses, the Parliament declared an amnesty in June 1993 covering all crimes committed by the armed forces, security forces as well as civilians, between April 1989 and April 1992. The government offered compensation to families of victims, which a few accepted in lieu of settlement. Despite this official amnesty, some Mauritanians have denounced the involvement of the government in the arrests and killings.

In the late 1980s, Ould Taya had established close co-operation with Iraq and pursued a strongly Arab nationalist line. Mauritania grew increasingly isolated internationally, and tensions with Western countries grew dramatically after it took a pro-Iraqi position during the 1991 Gulf War.

During the mid-to late 1990s, Mauritania shifted its foreign policy to one of increased co-operation with the US and Europe. It was rewarded with diplomatic normalization and aid projects. On 28 October 1999, Mauritania joined Egypt, Palestine, and Jordan as the only members of the Arab League to officially recognize Israel. Ould Taya also started co-operating with the United States in anti-terrorism activities, a policy that was criticized by some human rights organizations. (See also Foreign relations of Mauritania.)

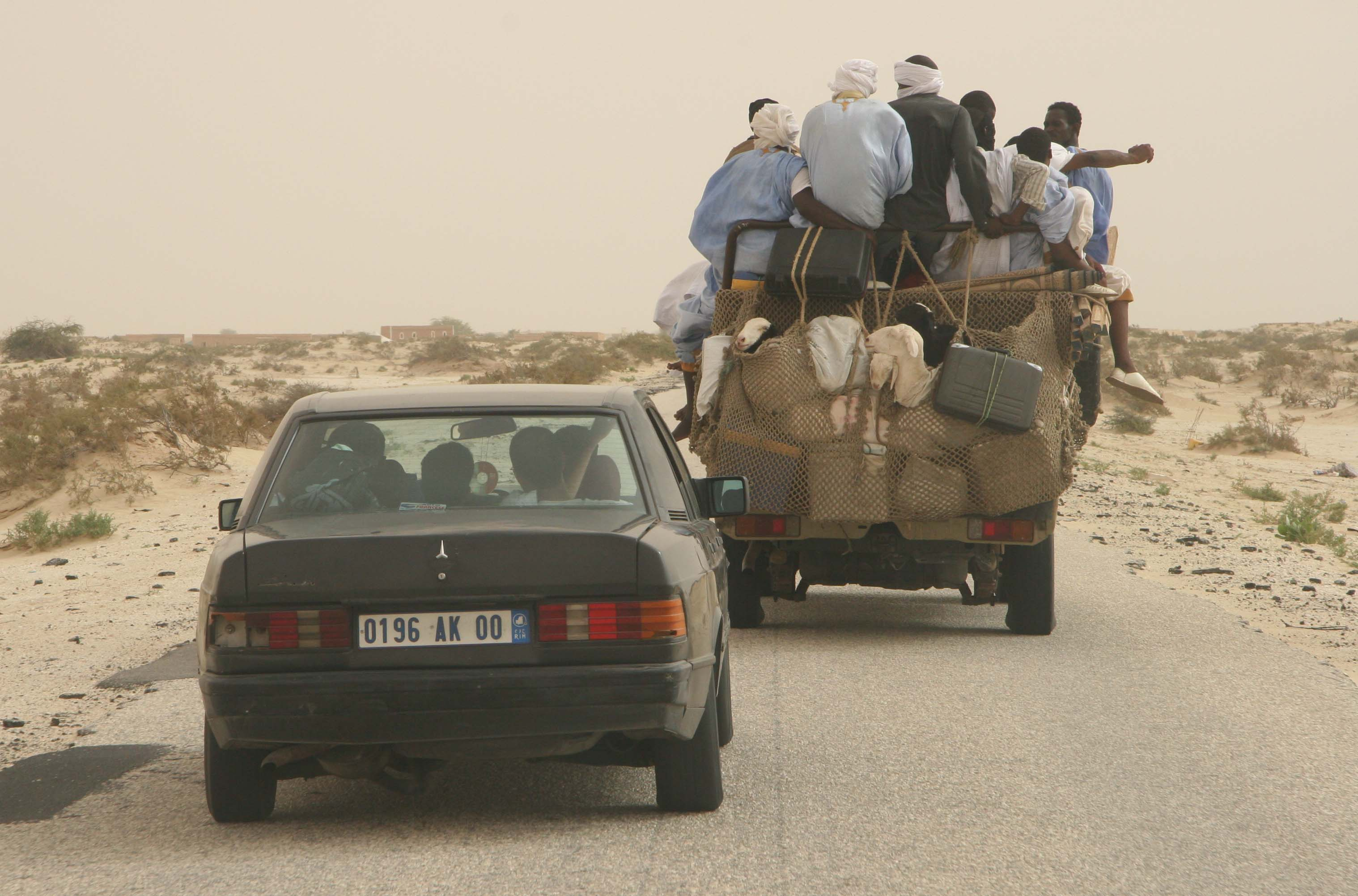
Road from Nouakchott to the Mauritanian–Senegalese border.

== 1991–2000 ==
Political parties, illegal during the military period, were legalized again in 1991. By April 1992, as civilian rule returned, 16 major political parties had been recognized; 12 major political parties were active in 2004. The Parti Républicain Démocratique et Social (PRDS), formerly led by President Maaouya Ould Sid'Ahmed Taya, dominated Mauritanian politics after the country's first multi-party elections in April 1992, following the approval by referendum of the current Constitution in July 1991. President Taya won elections in 1992 and 1997. Most opposition parties boycotted the first legislative election in 1992. For nearly a decade the parliament was dominated by the PRDS. The opposition participated in municipal elections in January–February 1994, and in subsequent Senate elections – most recently in April 2004 – and gained representation at the local level, as well as three seats in the Senate.

This period was marked by some ethnic violence and human rights abuses. Between 1990 and 1991, a campaign of violence took place against a background of Arabization, interference with blacks' association rights, expropriation and expatriation.

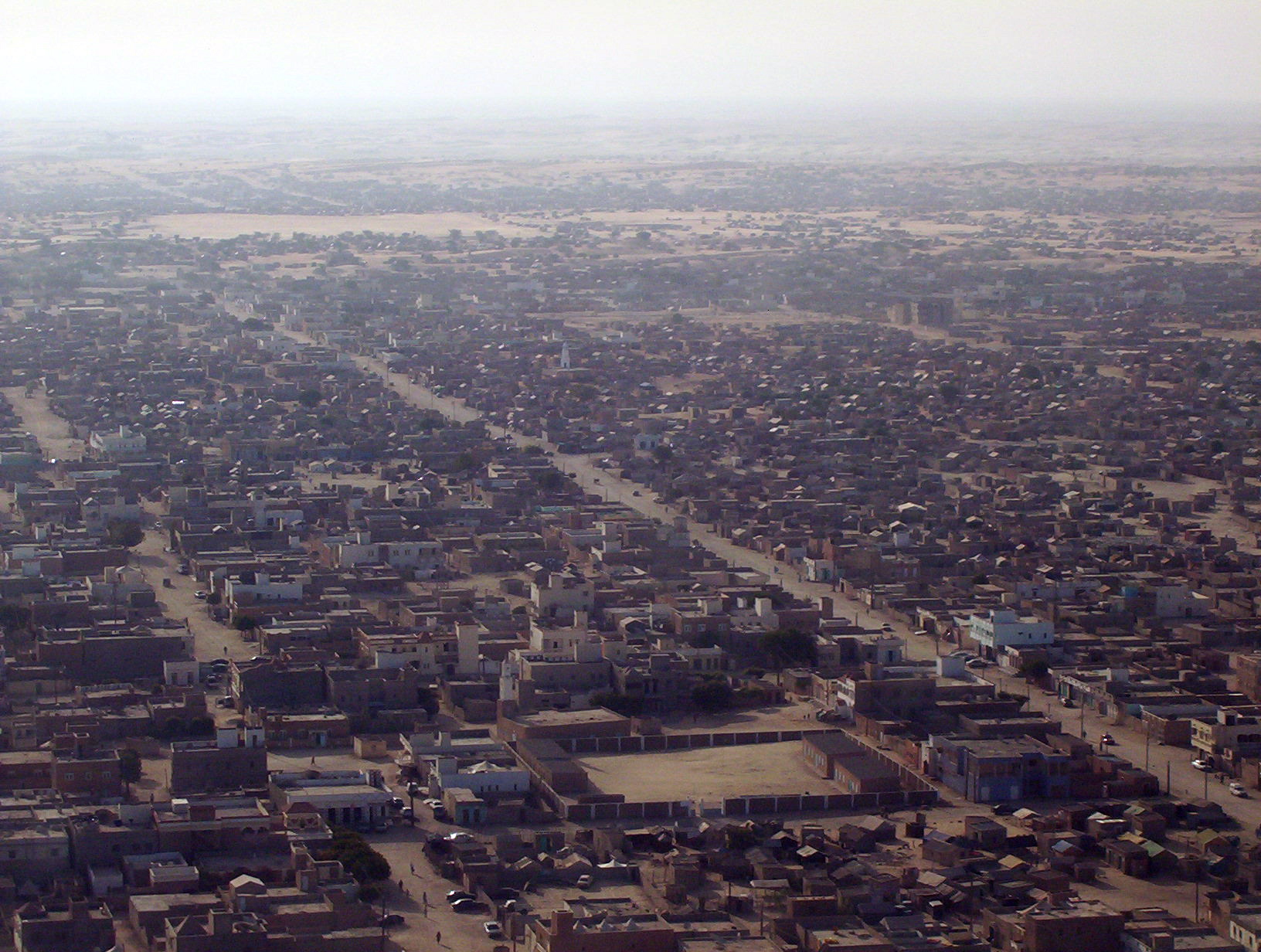
Aerial view of Nouakchott. The population of Nouakchott has increased from 20,000 in 1969 to almost 1 million in 2013.

In 1998, Mauritania became the third Arab country to officially recognize Israel, despite strong internal opposition. On 28 October 1999, Mauritanian Foreign Minister Ahmed Ould Sid'Ahmed and his Israeli counterpart David Levy signed an agreement in Washington DC, USA, establishing full diplomatic relations between the two countries. The signing ceremony was held at the U.S. State Department in the presence of US Secretary of State Madeleine Albright.

Mauritania thereby joined Egypt, Palestine, and Jordan as the only members of the Arab League to officially recognize Israel. Ould Taya also started co-operating with the United States in anti-terrorism activities, a policy which was criticized by some human rights organizations, which claimed that Mauritania's problem with terrorism was being misrepresented for geopolitical purposes.

== 2001–2004 ==
In 2001, elections incorporated more safeguards against voter fraud but opposition candidate (and former leader) Mohamed Khouna Ould Haidallah was nevertheless arrested prior to election day on charges of planning a coup, released the same day, and rearrested after the election. Attempted military coups and unrest instigated by Islamist opponents of the regime marred the early years of the 21st century, and the Taya regime's heavy-handed crackdowns were criticized by human rights groups.

On June 8, 2003, a failed coup attempt was made against President Maaouya Ould Sid'Ahmed Taya by forces unhappy with his imprisonment of Islamic leaders in the wake of the US-led invasion of Iraq and his establishment of full diplomatic relations with Israel. The coup was suppressed after two days of heavy fighting in the capital when pro-Taya military forces arrived from the countryside. A number of government officials were detained after the coup including the head of the Supreme Court, Mahfoud Ould Lemrabott, and the Secretary of State for Women's Affairs, Mintata Mint Hedeid. The coup leader, Saleh Ould Hanenna, a former army major sacked for opposing Taya's pro-Israel policies, was not captured or killed during the coup, he escaped.

Mauritania's presidential election, its third since adopting the democratic process in 1992, took place on 7 November 2003. Six candidates, including Mauritania's first female and first Haratine (descended from the original inhabitants of the Tassili n'Ajjer and Acacus Mountains during the Epipalaeolithic era) candidates, represented a wide variety of political goals and backgrounds. Incumbent President Maaouya Ould Sid'Ahmed Taya won reelection with 67% of the popular vote, according to the official figures, with Mohamed Khouna Ould Haidalla finishing second.

== 2005–2007 ==
On August 3, 2005, the Mauritanian military, including members of the Presidential guard (BASEP), seized control of key points in the capital of Nouakchott, performing a coup against the Government of President Maaouya Ould Sid'Ahmed Taya who was out of the country, attending the funeral of Saudi King Fahd. The officers released the following statement:

"The national armed forces and security forces have unanimously decided to put a definitive end to the oppressive activities of the defunct authority, which our people have suffered from during the past years."

Ould Taya was never able to return to his country and remains in exile in Qatar. The new junta called itself the Military Council for Justice and Democracy (CMJD), and rule of law. Col. Ely Ould Mohamed Vall emerged as leader at an early stage. Dissidents were released, and the political climate relaxed. A new constitution was approved in June 2006. Elections were held in March 2007, Sidi Ould Cheikh Abdallahi was elected president and Vall stood down.

Islamist militants shot and killed four French tourists on December 24, 2007.

== 2008 ==
On January 31, 2008, six militants shot at the Israeli embassy in Nouakchott, Mauritania, wounding locals. Embassy guards fired back, and the gunmen fled, shouting "God is great." Boaz Bismuth, the Ambassador of Israel to Mauritania, said the militants did not harm Israeli or Mauritanian government officials.

On August 6, 2008, Mauritania's presidential spokesman Abdoulaye Mamadouba said President Sidi Ould Cheikh Abdallahi, Prime Minister Yahya Ould Ahmed Waghf and the Interior minister, were arrested by renegade Senior Mauritanian army officers, unknown troops and a group of generals, and were held under house arrest at the Presidential palace in Nouakchott. In the apparently successful and bloodless coup d'etat, Abdallahi daughter, Amal Mint Cheikh Abdallahi said: "The security agents of the BASEP (Presidential Security Battalion) came to our home and took away my father." The coup plotters are top fired Mauritania's security forces, which include General Muhammad Ould 'Abd Al-'Aziz, General Muhammad Ould Al-Ghazwani, General Philippe Swikri, and Brigadier General (Aqid) Ahmed Ould Bakri. Mauritanian lawmaker, Mohammed Al Mukhtar, announced that "many of the country's people were supporting the takeover attempt and the government is "an authoritarian regime" and that the president had "marginalized the majority in parliament."

== 2009 ==
A presidential election was held on 18 July 2009. Mohamed Ould Abdel Aziz, the leader of the 2008 coup d'état, was declared winner with a narrow majority.

== 2017 ==
The new flag, which was approved by the referendum, adding the two red horizontal stripes.

On August 5, 2017, a constitutional referendum was voted upon by the citizens of Mauritania. The referendum, which was proposed by Mauritanian President Mohamed Ould Abdel Aziz and his Union for the Republic Party (UPR) contained many sweeping proposals including changing the national flag, modifying the national anthem, and abolishing the Mauritanian Senate. In March, the notions were put before the Parliament of Mauritania but were halted when the Senate voted against them.

Originally, the referendum was scheduled to take place on July 15, but was rescheduled to August 5 due to changes in the proposed constitutional amendments and protests. The referendum was passed by an overwhelming majority, but this could be attributed to several opposition parties calling for a boycott of the vote. On August 6, the day following the vote, the various constitutional amendments were officially adopted and enacted.

== 2019 ==
In August 2019, former general Mohamed Ould Ghazouani was sworn in as Mauritania's tenth president since its Independence from France in 1960. His predecessor Mohamed Ould Abdel Aziz ran the African desert country for 10 years.

== 2023 ==
In December 2023, former president Mohamed Ould Abdel Aziz was arrested and sentenced to 5 years in prison for corruption.

== 2024 ==
In June 2024, President Ghazouani was re-elected for a second term.
