= Human rights in Mauritania =

Human rights in Mauritania are generally seen as poor according to international observers, including Freedom House, the United States Department of State, and Amnesty International.

As of 2026, Freedom House classifies Mauritania as partly free with a global freedom score of 38/100.

== Overview ==
With a July 2012 estimated population of 3.4 million, Mauritania is a highly centralized Islamic Republic with no legal provisions for freedom of religion.

Coming from French colonial rule, Mauritania was ethnically divided between Arabic-speaking tribal confederations of the north and sedentary black populations of the south, many of whom were traditionally bonded communities or enslaved individuals. The Mauritanian Government has a history of discriminating against these Toucouleurs and Soninke people within its borders. One such example occurred in 1987, when the government imprisoned southerners and threw others out of the Army, resulting in the Mauritania–Senegal Border War.

Amnesty International has accused the Mauritanian legal system of functioning with a complete disregard of legal procedure, fair trial, or humane imprisonment. Amnesty International has also accused the Mauritanian government of an institutionalized and continuous use of torture for decades.

According to the Constitution of Mauritania, international law prevails over domestic Mauritanian law as soon as the international law is published in the Official Gazette.

== Respect for the integrity of the person ==
=== Arbitrary or unlawful deprivation of life ===
On 27 September 2011, a gendarme fired on demonstrators in Maghama, reportedly killing one person and wounding eight others. The demonstrators were protesting a national voter registration campaign that they believed would discriminate against Afro-Mauritanians due to an alleged lack of ethnic balance among officials evaluating citizenship. Demonstrators demanded greater Afro-Mauritanian representation and an unbiased citizenship verification procedure. On 27 September, former Minister of the Interior Mohamed Ould Boilil publicly confirmed the reports and declared that the government would not permit disturbances of the peace. There was no reported investigation of the death by the end of 2011.

=== Disappearance ===
There were no reports of politically motivated disappearances in 2011.

=== Torture and other cruel, inhuman, or degrading treatment or punishment ===
The Constitution and statutes of Mauritania prohibit these practices, and according to the governmental Commissariat for Human Rights, Humanitarian Action, and Relations with Civil Society, there were no documented cases of torture during 2011. Independent human rights observers, however, stated that security personnel tortured detainees to extract confessions. Torture methods in 2011 and previous years reportedly included kicking, beating, electric shocks, cigarette burns, pulling out of hair, sexual violence, suspension by the arms, shackling in painful positions, and deprivation of sleep and food. One prisoner described to Amnesty International how he was tortured in the "jaguar position", which consisted of tying the detainee's hands and feet together, suspending him from an iron bar, and hitting and torturing him while in this position.

==== Prison and detention center conditions ====
Prison conditions were harsh in 2011, and the government's capacity to administer detention facilities remained poor.

There were credible reports of torture, beating, and abuse in police detention centers, several prisons throughout the country, and gendarmerie and military facilities. A new prison facility was opened in Aleg on 28 November, and another prison facility neared completion in Nouadhibou. The government, however, failed to allocate sufficient funds for improving prison conditions in the existing facilities during the year, and overcrowding, violence among inmates, and poor medical care in prisons continued. Many prisoners were unable to leave their extremely crowded cells or breathe fresh air for months or years at a time. Sanitation conditions were poor due to the lack of hygienic products such as soap and detergent and prison management's inability to dispose of waste properly. Malnutrition was a more serious problem, affecting vulnerable members of the prison population, particularly foreign inmates, prisoners without familial support, and individuals suffering from untreated diseases. The government did not respond robustly to allegations of inhumane conditions, although some progress was made in improving the quality of health care.

Serious overcrowding and a lack of running water contributed to the spread of diseases in 2011. Prisoners with health problems received little or no care, and medical supplies remained insufficient.

The holding areas in police stations in 2011 were also reportedly overcrowded, unsanitary, and very poorly ventilated.

There were no ombudsmen at the prison level in 2011. Regulations allowed the inmates in an institution to choose one of their number to represent them in dealings with management, and inmates occasionally did so during 2011.

According to the penitentiary administration directorate in 2011, the women's prison is less crowded and therefore more comfortable than the men's. On the other hand, male guards participated in monitoring female inmates, who risked becoming victims of sexual violence.

Nongovernmental organizations (NGOs) in 2011 continued to denounce overcrowding and long pretrial detention. The large number of pretrial detainees exacerbated prison overcrowding. The detainees were frequently housed with convicted and often dangerous prisoners. As of 19 October, according to Ministry of Justice statistics, the prison population totaled 1,695, of whom 861 were convicts and 834 were unconvicted detainees. On 23 May, authorities removed a reported 13-14 suspected terrorists awaiting trial from Nouakchott Central Prison to an undisclosed location to improve prison security and disrupt illicit activity.

Because of poor security and dangerous prisoners sharing cells with less dangerous ones, prisoners lived in a climate of violence in 2011. Some had to pay bribes to other prisoners to avoid being brutalized and harassed.

Of the 54 children in detention, 34 were in a segregated courtyard of the Nouakchott Central Prison at the end of 2011 after a juvenile detention center in Beyla suffered structural damage. Seventeen were being held in a detention center for the "reception and insertion" of youth in conflict with the law. The center's goal is to facilitate the social reintegration of children and youth. During the year, officials released 30 children from this center and monitored their subsequent activities.

Women and female minors under 18 years of age were housed together in a separate location from the men and male minors in 2011. Sexual violence reportedly occurred in the women's prison, which employed both male and female guards. Children of female prisoners remained with their mothers or were placed by the Ministry of Justice in the temporary custody of family members.

Prisoners had access to visitors in 2011. The government permitted prison visits by NGOs, diplomats, and international human rights observers. The International Committee of the Red Cross had access to prisons and conducted multiple prison visits, including visits to terrorism suspects, in accordance with its standard modalities. There were reports that police did not inform family members or friends of the location and condition of detainees in a timely manner, preventing them from receiving adequate food.

There were no reports in 2011 that men were denied the right to observe Muslim prayer obligations individually, but the penitentiary administration confirmed that inmates did not have regular access to imams.

=== Arbitrary detention ===
The Constitution and statutes of Mauritania prohibit arbitrary arrest and detention, but authorities in 2011 did not observe these prohibitions. In some cases, authorities arbitrarily arrested and detained protesters and journalists.

Human rights and other observers accused the government of exceeding the legal limits for pretrial detention in 2011. Security forces, at times, arrested demonstrators engaged in sit-ins, marches, or rallies, and held them longer than the regulations allow. On 29 September, the media reported that following a violent protest in Nouakchott against the national registration initiative, security forces entered private residences without warrants and arrested approximately 20 individuals.

By law, a minor may not be held for more than six months while awaiting trial. Nevertheless, there were reports in 2011 that a large number of individuals, including minors, remained in pretrial detention for extended periods due to judicial ineptitude.

==== Role of the police and security apparatus ====
The National Police, under the Ministry of the Interior, are responsible for law enforcement and maintaining order in urban areas. The National Guard, also under the Ministry of the Interior, performs limited police functions in keeping with its peacetime role as security support at government facilities. The National Guard may also be called on by regional authorities to restore civil order during large-scale disturbances such as rioting. The gendarmerie, a specialized paramilitary group under the Ministry of Defense, is responsible for maintaining civil order within and outside of metropolitan areas, as well as providing law enforcement services in rural areas. On 11 October 2011, a new police force, the General Group for Road Safety, began operations under the Ministry of the Interior.

The police were poorly paid, trained, and equipped in 2011. Corruption and impunity were serious problems.

The government rarely held security officials accountable or prosecuted them for abuses in 2011. The Ethics Police operates as an internal affairs division and as a mechanism to investigate security force abuses. In practice, this unit did not publicly review security force abuses.

==== Arrest procedures and treatment while in detention ====
The application of constitutional safeguards continued to vary widely from case to case in 2011.

The law requires duly authorized arrest warrants, but they were not commonly used in 2011.

The law requires that, in most cases, courts review the legality of a person's detention within 48 hours of arrest. Police may extend the period for an additional 48 hours, and a prosecutor or court can detain persons for up to 15 days in national security cases. Authorities generally respected the two-week deadline for formally arraigning or releasing terrorism suspects in national security cases.

Only after the prosecutor submits charges does a suspect have the right to contact an attorney. By law, indigent defendants are entitled to attorneys at state expense, but in practice, attorneys were not provided in 2011.

There was a bail system in 2011, but sometimes judges arbitrarily refused lawyers' requests for bail or set inordinately high bail amounts.

===== Pretrial detention =====
In 2011, lawyers highlighted the lengthy incarceration of detainees and delays in organizing court hearings, but no statistics on the average length of detention or length of pretrial procedures were available.

===== Amnesty =====
During 2011, President Mohamed Ould Abdel Aziz pardoned 269 prisoners, including eight women sentenced for "zina", or sexual relations outside marriage. Human rights activists and individuals associated with drug trafficking were also among those released.

=== Denial of a fair public trial ===
The Constitution and statutes of Mauritania provide for an independent judiciary, but it was not independent in practice in 2011. The executive branch continued to exercise significant influence over the judiciary through its ability to appoint and remove judges. The government generally respected court orders.

Poorly educated and trained judges were susceptible in 2011 to social, financial, and tribal pressures that limited judicial fairness. On 15 May, three juveniles received the death penalty, in violation of national legislation and ratified international conventions, for their role in the death of another minor. Observers suggested that the court was influenced by tribal and social factors. On 12 December, the sentences were reduced to 12 years in prison and a combined 1.2 million ouguiya (US$4,130) fine.

During 2011, international donors, including the International Organization for Migration and the World Bank, funded training for prosecutors and judges with the aim of increasing judicial professionalism.

==== Trial procedures ====
Shari'a provides the legal principles upon which the law and legal procedure are based.

The law provides for due process. Defendants are presumed innocent. They have the right to a public trial and to be present during their trial. Juries are not used. All defendants, regardless of the court or their ability to pay, have the legal right to representation by counsel during proceedings. Although a court should appoint an attorney free of charge to represent a defendant lacking the ability to pay, this measure was rarely followed during 2011. Defendants have the right of appeal. Defendants can confront or question witnesses and present witnesses and evidence in both civil and criminal cases. By law, defendants have access to government-held evidence, but access in 2011 was difficult in practice. These rights were extended to minorities. The foregoing rights generally were observed in practice for men but did not extend equally to women.

The courts in 2011 did not treat women equally in all cases. Lawyers also reported that in some instances, the unequal treatment of women was based on such considerations as a woman's caste or nationality.

A special court hears cases involving persons under the age of 18. Children who appeared before the court received more lenient sentences than adults, and extenuating circumstances received greater consideration in juvenile cases. The minimum age for children to be tried is 12 years old. Children between the ages of 12 and 18 who are convicted of a crime are sentenced to detention centers for minors.

==== Political prisoners and detainees ====
There were no reports in 2011 of political prisoners or detainees.

==== Civil judicial procedures and remedies ====
Complaints of human rights violations are within the jurisdiction of the Administrative Court. Individuals or organizations can appeal decisions to international or regional courts. Nongovernmental organization representatives stated they collaborated with the court in 2011, but the court was not impartial in practice. There are administrative and judicial remedies through the social chamber of the Court of Appeals and through the Supreme Court.

=== Arbitrary interference with privacy, family, home, or correspondence ===
The Constitution of Mauritania prohibits such actions, and the government generally respected these prohibitions in practice in 2011.

== Respect for civil liberties ==
=== Freedom of speech and press ===
==== Status of freedom of speech and press ====
The Constitution of Mauritania provides for freedom of speech, and the government in 2011 generally respected this right in practice. Individuals could criticize the government publicly or privately. Two daily newspapers and all broadcast media were government-owned, but several independent daily publications were active and generally expressed a wide variety of views with limited restrictions. Newspapers are relatively free of government pressure.

Some journalists practiced self-censorship when covering topics deemed sensitive, including the military forces, corruption, and the application of Shari'a. There were reports that police detained and questioned journalists during 2011 in connection with their coverage of such topics as protests and slavery. Some opposition leaders asserted that they had no effective access to official media.

Independent media remained the principal source of information for most citizens in 2011, followed by government media. Government media focused primarily on official news but provided some coverage of opposition activities and views throughout the year. The government-owned TV Mauritania occasionally broadcasts programs covering opposition activities. During the national political dialogue in September and October, government media maintained balanced coverage of opposition and pro-government statements.

==== Actions to expand press freedom ====
On October 5, 2011, the legislative branch adopted amendments to the 2006 Press Freedom Law that abolished prison sentences for slander and defamation of individuals, including heads of state and accredited ambassadors. Fines for these offenses remain in effect. Some journalists continued to object to the "elastic" application of the law, which they assert could be interpreted loosely to penalize journalists for their reporting.

Signaling the end of the government's 51-year monopoly of the broadcast media, on 18 September 2011, the High Press and Audiovisual Authority (HAPA) began taking applications for five new radio stations and five new television channels to be owned by nongovernmental entities. HAPA received 17 applications for radio stations and nine applications for television channels. On 20 November, HAPA announced that two independent television stations and five independent radio stations received permission to broadcast. Some members of the opposition asserted that the permits issued favored pro-government interests.

==== Internet freedom ====
The OpenNet Initiative (ONI) classified Mauritania as engaged in selective Internet filtering in the political area and found no evidence of filtering in the social, security/conflict, and Internet tools areas in 2009. There is no individual ONI country profile for Mauritania, but it is included in the ONI regional overview for the Middle East and North Africa.

There were no government restrictions on access to the Internet or reports that the government monitored email or Internet chat rooms in 2010. Individuals and groups could engage in the peaceful expression of views via the Internet, including by e-mail. There is a law prohibiting child pornography with penalties of two months to one year imprisonment and a 160,000 to 300,000 ouguiya ($550 to $1,034) fine.

Internet access is available in urban areas throughout the country, with home access common among the affluent and internet cafés serving the remainder of the population. According to International Telecommunication Union statistics for 2009, approximately 2.28 percent of the country's inhabitants used the Internet.

Between 16 March and 19 March 2009 and again on 25 June 2009, the news website Taqadoumy was blocked. On 26 February 2010, Hanevy Ould Dehah, Director of Taqadoumy, received a presidential pardon after being detained since December 2009 despite having served his sentence for crimes against Islam and paying all imposed fines and legal fees. Dehah, who was originally arrested in June 2009 on charges of defamation of presidential candidate Ibrahima Moctar Sarr for publishing an article stating that Ibrahima Moctar Sarr bought a house with campaign money from General Aziz. Ould Dehah was sentenced in August 2009 to six months in prison and fined 30,000 ouguiya ($111) for committing acts contrary to Islam and decency. The sentencing judge accused Dehah of creating a space allowing individuals to express anti-Islamic and indecent views, based on a female reader's comments made on the Taqadoumy site, calling for increased sexual freedom.

==== Academic freedom and cultural events ====
There were no government restrictions in 2011 on academic freedom or cultural events.

=== Freedom of peaceful assembly and association ===
==== Freedom of assembly ====
The constitution of Mauritania provides for freedom of assembly. The law requires that organizers apply to the local prefect (hakim) for permission to hold large meetings or assemblies. Authorities generally granted permission in 2011 but on some occasions denied it in circumstances that suggested the application of political criteria.

Security forces on several occasions in 2011 forcefully dispersed unauthorized demonstrations organized by the Youth of February 25, a group seeking political, social, and economic reforms, and the Do Not Touch My Nationality movement (TPMN), which was protesting the registration drive. On 4 August, according to Amnesty International, authorities arrested four antislavery activists for participating in a protest against the alleged enslavement of a 10-year-old girl. The four men were charged with "unauthorized gathering" and "rebellion" and were given six-month suspended sentences by a Nouakchott court. Another participant, whom police detained, alleged that police kicked and punched him.

==== Freedom of association ====
The constitution of Mauritania provides for freedom of association, and the government generally respected this right in 2011.

All political parties and local nongovernmental organizations (NGOs) must register with the Ministry of the Interior. The government encouraged local NGOs to join the government-sponsored Civil Society Platform in 2011. The approximately 300 NGOs that are members of the platform do not receive government funding.

There were approximately 78 accredited political parties and NGOs in 2011, and they generally functioned openly, issuing public statements, and choosing their own leadership. The government generally did not prevent unrecognized political parties or NGOs from functioning.

=== Freedom of religion ===
Officially, 100% of Mauritanian citizens are Muslim. The Organization of Liberals Mauritania advocates for freedom of belief due to the Minority's insistence on asserting their rights as atheists and Christians.

The constitution, statutes, and policies of Mauritania restrict religious freedom. The 1991 Constitution defines the country as an Islamic republic and recognizes Islam as the sole religion of its citizens and the state.

Because of this stance, all non-Muslims are prohibited from being citizens of the country. Persons who convert from Islam lose their citizenship. Article 306 of the Penal Code outlaws apostasy. It states that any Muslim found guilty of the crime will be given the opportunity to repent within three days and if the person does not repent, the individual will be sentenced to death and the person's property will be confiscated by the Treasury.

The government and citizenry consider Islam to be the essential cohesive element unifying the various ethnic groups in the country. There is a cabinet-level Ministry of Islamic Affairs and Traditional Education tasked with enacting and communicating fatwas, fighting religious extremism, promoting research in Islamic studies, organizing the pilgrimage and the Umrah, and monitoring mosques. The High Council of Islam, consisting of six imams, advises the government on conformance of legislation to Islamic precepts.

There were no reports of abuses of religious freedom in 2011. In an effort to curtail radical extremism, the government collaborated with independent religious organizations on various round tables focused on moderation in Islam.

There were no reports in 2011 of societal abuses or discrimination based on religious affiliation, belief, or practice; however, international organizations active among Christians reported that persons who participated in Christian gatherings were ostracized by their families and neighbors.

The government prohibits the printing and distribution of non-Islamic religious materials, although possession of these materials is legal. Although there is no specific legal prohibition against proselytizing by non-Muslims, in practice the government prohibits such activity through the broad interpretation of Article 5 of the constitution that states, "Islam shall be the religion of the people and of the State." There is an unofficial government requirement that restricts non-Muslims from holding worship services only in the few Christian churches in the country. The government requires that religious groups receive official authorization before they can meet, even in private homes. In practice, officials did not always enforce this requirement in 2011.

The government does not register religious groups; however, nongovernmental organizations (NGOs), including humanitarian and development NGOs affiliated with religious groups, must register with the Ministry of the Interior. New laws in 2021 make it easier for faith-based NGOs to register and operate, but they are not allowed to proselytize or promote non-Islamic religions.

Mohamed Cheikh Ould Mkhaitir, a blogger, was arrested in 2014 for apostasy and subsequently sentenced to death. He remained on death row for several years, as the Supreme Court upheld his sentence and sent the case back to a lower court. Mkhaitir was eventually released from prison in 2019, after which he left Mauritania to begin a new life in France.

=== Freedom of movement, internally displaced persons, protection of refugees, and stateless persons ===
The constitution and statutes of Mauritania provide for freedom of movement within the country, foreign travel, emigration, and repatriation. The government generally respected these rights in 2011, but there were exceptions.

The government cooperated with the Office of the United Nations High Commissioner for Refugees (UNHCR), the International Organization for Migration, and other humanitarian organizations in providing protection and assistance to internally displaced persons, refugees, returning refugees, asylum seekers, stateless persons, and other persons of concern. In practice, resources provided by the government were inadequate.

Persons lacking identity cards in 2011 could not travel freely in some regions. In response to what it described as an increased terrorist threat, the government set up mobile roadblocks where gendarmerie, police, or customs officials checked the papers of travelers. These roadblocks often provided the occasion for officials to demand bribes.

Unlike in 2010, authorities did not restrict the international travel of some opposition members in 2011.

==== Protection of refugees ====
The laws of Mauritania provide for the granting of asylum or refugee status, and the government has established a system for providing protection to refugees. The National Consultative Commission for Refugees (CNCR) is the national body for determining refugee status. The Office of the United Nations High Commissioner for Refugees carries out refugee status determinations under its mandate and presents cases to the CNCR for recognition.

In 2011, the government provided protection against the expulsion or return of refugees to countries where their lives or freedoms would be threatened on account of their race, religion, nationality, membership in a particular social group, or political opinion. The government protected approximately 500 refugees during the year.

Under agreements with the Economic Community of West African States on freedom of movement, the government in 2011 allowed West African migrants to remain in the country, deporting only those found illegally seeking to reach the Canary Islands. According to Interior Ministry statistics, 2,001 migrants were returned to their country of origin during the year.

Mauritanian law provides refugees with access to the job market and basic services, including health care and education. The UNHCR provided assistance to refugees with revenue-generating activities throughout 2011.

Under an official multiyear repatriation agreement with Senegal, thousands of refugees from that country have returned to Mauritania. The National Agency for the Welcome and Reintegration of Refugees (ANAIR) is responsible for overseeing the reintegration of repatriated refugees, providing administration and identification support, and contributing to the social and economic development of resettlement areas. Reintegration of returnees into communities has been challenging due to inefficient sanitation, health, and education infrastructure, and land disputes. Initially, the majority of Afro-Mauritanian returnees were unable to obtain identity cards and birth certificates, but according to ANAIR, all returnees are included, or scheduled to be included, in the new national registration database that was launched on 6 May 2011.

== Respect for political rights ==
The Constitution of Mauritania provides citizens the right to change their government peacefully, and the country accomplished a peaceful transition from military rule with the presidential election of 2009, followed the same year by the indirect election of one-third of the seats in the Senate. However, the government indefinitely postponed scheduled elections of municipal councilors, the members of the National Assembly, and another third of Senate seats, due to the inability to reach an agreement with opposition parties.

=== Elections and political participation ===
Mauritania returned to constitutional rule in 2009 following the Dakar Accord, which resulted in the agreement of President Sidi Ould Cheikh Abdallahi to resign and the formation of a Transitional Government of National Unity.

In an election held in 2009, former High State Council leader General Mohamed Ould Abdel Aziz won 53 percent of the vote. Although some opposition groups claimed the election was fraudulent and requested an investigation, the Constitutional Council certified the election.

Elections by municipal councils to fill one-third of the seats in the Senate, also in 2009, resulted in a large win for the Union for the Republic (UPR). Opposition and independent candidates denounced what they characterized as heavy pressure on the municipal councilors to vote for majority party candidates and on independent candidates to withdraw. Authorities did not investigate these complaints.

Indirect elections for another one-third of the Senate seats were originally scheduled for 24 April 2011, but they were postponed twice due to the inability of the government and a coalition of opposition parties to agree on the opposition's demand that the Electoral Code be rewritten, the ruling coalition dissolved, and laws regulating the media reformed. The opposition coalition indicated it would not participate in elections until its demands were met. The majority and opposition parties engaged in a national dialogue from 17 September to 19 October to resolve their political impasse, but no timetable for Senate, National Assembly, or municipal elections had been established by the end of 2011. The Constitutional Council subsequently ruled that a delay of parliamentary elections until May 2012 would be legal.

There were 18 women in the National Assembly and six in the 56-seat Senate in 2011. The 27-member cabinet included three women, three Black Moors, and five Afro-Mauritanians. The law requires that women make up at least 20 percent of candidates on legislative candidate lists. It was observed in practice during 2011.

== Official corruption and government transparency ==
The law provides criminal penalties for official corruption, but authorities in 2011 did not enforce the law effectively, and officials often engaged in corrupt practices with impunity. Corrupt practices were widely believed to exist at all levels of government, and the World Bank's Worldwide Governance Indicators reflected that corruption was a severe problem. Mauritania ranked 143 out of 183 countries in the 2011 Corruption Perceptions Index reported by Transparency International.

There were reports in 2011 that government officials frequently used their power to obtain such favors as unauthorized exemption from taxes, special grants of land, and preferential treatment during bidding on government projects. Corruption was most pervasive in government procurement, bank loans, fishing-license distribution, land distribution, and tax payments.

The Ministry of the Interior's Economic Crimes Brigade and the Office of the Inspector General were responsible in 2011 for investigating corruption. On 16 January, the Judiciary Council created the Criminal Division for Economic and Financial Crimes, a special chamber responsible for economic crimes, to reinforce the legal efforts against corruption. During the year, this body completed seven investigations resulting in the dismissal of several government officials.

Corruption and impunity were also serious problems in the police force in 2011, and the government rarely held security officials accountable or prosecuted them for abuses. Police regularly demanded bribes at nightly roadblocks in Nouakchott and at checkpoints between cities. There were numerous reports that police arbitrarily detained individuals for several hours or overnight at roadblocks in Nouakchott or other towns. According to these reports, police detained motorists or passengers without asking for identity papers or vehicle registration, and without searching the vehicles. Judicial corruption was also a problem.

In 2011, the government enforced the requirement that senior officials, including the President, file a declaration of their personal assets at the beginning and end of their service. Senior officials reportedly disclose their assets through an internal procedure, but the information is not released to the public.

The law provides for public access to government information, and the government granted such access to citizens and noncitizens, including foreign media, during 2011.

== Governmental attitude regarding international and nongovernmental investigation of alleged violations of human rights ==
Several domestic and international human rights groups generally operated without government restriction in 2011, investigating and publishing their findings on human rights cases. Government officials were somewhat cooperative and responsive to their views.

An independent ombudsman organization, the National Commission on Human Rights, includes government and civil society representatives. In 2011, it actively monitored human rights and advocated for government action to correct violations.

== Discrimination, societal abuses, and trafficking in persons ==
The constitution and statutes of Mauritania do not provide for equality for all citizens regardless of race, national origin, sex, or social status and prohibit racial or ethnic propaganda. But the government in 2011 often favored individuals on the basis of racial and tribal affiliation, social status, and political ties.

=== Women ===
According to nongovernmental organizations (NGOs), the incidence of both reported and unreported rape in 2011 continued to be high, and rape was considered a serious problem. Rape, including spousal rape, is illegal. According to the Penal Code, rapists who are single men faced penalties of forced labor and flagellation. Married rapists could be subject to the death penalty. In practice, rape cases rarely went to trial. In several cases, wealthy rape suspects reportedly avoided prosecution or, if prosecuted, avoided prison. Families of the victim commonly reached an agreement with the rapist for monetary compensation. National statistics on arrests, prosecutions, and convictions for rape were unavailable. Human rights activists and lawyers reported that rape victims were stigmatized, persecuted, and even imprisoned. Since rape was tied to the concept of adultery, judges could hold the victim responsible for the rape. There were no convictions for rape during 2011.

Domestic violence was considered a serious problem in 2011. Spousal abuse and domestic violence are illegal, but the government did not enforce the law effectively, and most cases went unreported. There are no specific penalties for domestic violence, and convictions were very rare. No reliable government statistics on prosecutions, convictions, and sentences for domestic violence were available. In 2010, the Association of Female Heads of Families (AFCF) provided legal assistance to 1,753 domestic violence victims. Police and the judiciary occasionally intervened in domestic abuse cases, but women rarely sought legal redress, relying instead on family, NGOs, and community leaders to resolve domestic disputes. Many domestic violence cases are handled by a traditional judge under Shari'a outside the secular system. NGOs reported that in certain cases, they had turned directly to police for help to protect victims of domestic violence, but police declined to investigate.

Traditional forms of mistreatment of women appeared to decline during 2011. One of these is the forced feeding of adolescent girls (gavage) prior to marriage, practiced only among White Moor tribal groups. Increased government, media, and civil society attention to the problem, including the health risks associated with excessive body weight, led to a marked decline in the traditional encouragement of female obesity. Overeating to conform to cultural standards was practiced primarily in rural areas, but many urban women endangered their health by taking pills to gain weight or increase their appetite.

There are no laws against sexual harassment. Women's NGOs reported in 2011 that it was a common problem in the workplace.

The government in 2011 recognized the right of individuals and couples to decide freely and responsibly the number, spacing, and timing of their children and to have the information and means to do so free from discrimination, violence, or coercion. Reproductive issues were a sensitive topic and a focus of some women's groups. Government health centers did not provide unmarried women with access to contraception, and did so for married women only with the consent of the husband. Contraception was available at private health centers for those who could afford it.

Women have legal rights to property and child custody, and these rights were recognized in 2011 among the more educated and urbanized members of the population. However, women's legal rights were restricted in comparison with those of men. Divorced women could potentially lose child custody if they remarried. By local tradition, a woman's first marriage requires parental consent. In accordance with the personal status code, men can marry up to four women but are required to obtain the consent of their existing spouse or spouses before marrying again. Government awareness programs encouraged women to obtain a contractual agreement at the time of marriage, stipulating that the marriage ends if the husband marries a second wife. This practice was common in Moor society. Nevertheless, women who did not establish a solid contract remained unprotected. In addition, the validity of and right to establish prenuptial agreements were not always respected. Polygamy continued to be rare among Moors but was gaining in popularity. It was common among other ethnic groups. Arranged marriages were increasingly rare, particularly among the Moor population. Cultural resistance to marriages among members of different castes persisted, and NGOs reported that powerful individuals used the judicial system to intimidate and persecute members of their families who married below their social rank.

Women still faced legal discrimination in 2011, and they were considered minors in the eyes of the law. According to Shari'a as applied in Mauritania, the testimony of two women was necessary to equal that of one man. The courts granted only half as large an indemnity to the family of a woman who was killed as to the family of a man. Formulas for property distribution varied widely from case to case. Human rights lawyers reported that judges treated cases concerning White Moor women, female slaves or other lower-caste women, and foreign women differently. The personal status code provides a framework for the consistent application of secular law and Shari'a-based family law, but it is not uniformly employed.

Women did not face legal discrimination in 2011 in areas not addressed specifically by Shari'a. The law provides that men and women should receive equal pay for equal work. The two largest employers, the civil service and the state mining company, observed this law, although most employers in the private sector did not apply it in practice. In the modern wage sector, women also receive family benefits, including three months of maternity leave.

=== Children ===
The law makes special provision for children's welfare, and there were government programs in 2011 to care for abandoned children. But inadequate funding hampered the effectiveness of these programs. Similar to other countries in the Maghreb region, this results in a high number of children in institutions in Mauritania.

==== Birth registration ====
By law, citizenship is normally derived from one's father. Citizenship can be derived from one's mother under the following two conditions: (1) if the mother is a citizen and the father's nationality is unknown; or (2) if the child was born in Mauritania to a citizen mother and repudiates the father's nationality a year before reaching majority. Children born abroad to citizens can acquire citizenship one year before reaching majority. Minor children of parents who have become naturalized citizens are also eligible for citizenship.

In most of the country in 2011, the government generally registered births immediately, but in the south, many citizens reported not having birth certificates or national identity papers. In addition, some slaves did not have birth certificates. There was no official data about the number of unregistered births.

==== Education ====
The law mandates six years of school attendance for all children, but the law was not effectively enforced in 2011. Many children, particularly girls, did not attend school for six years. Children of slave-caste families often did not receive an education.

Public education was tuition-free through university level. Classes were fully integrated in 2011, including both boys and girls and students from all social and ethnic groups. In addition to public schools, almost all children, regardless of gender or ethnic group, attended Qur'anic school between the ages of five and seven and gained at least rudimentary skills in reading and writing Arabic.

==== Child abuse ====
Child abuse was reported, but no data were available to indicate its prevalence in 2011.

==== Child labor ====
As reported in the latest version of the U.S. Department of Labor's List of Goods Produced by Child Labor or Forced Labor, instances of child labor are still observed in agriculture and cattle herding.

==== Child marriage ====
The legal marriage age is 18, but the law was rarely enforced, and reports of child marriage were widespread. Because consensual sex outside of marriage is illegal, a "weli" (tutor) can present a case to local authorities requesting permission for a girl younger than 18 years old to marry. In practice, authorities frequently granted this permission.

==== Harmful traditional practices ====
Female genital mutilation (FGM) was practiced in 2011 by all ethnic groups and performed on young girls, often on the seventh day after birth and almost always before the age of six months. The child protection Penal Code states that any act or attempt to damage a female child's sexual organs is punishable by imprisonment and a 120,000-to-300,000-ouguiya (US$410 to $1,034) penalty. The most recent statistics on FGM indicated a decrease in incidence from 71 percent in 2001 to 65 percent in 2007, mainly due to a decline in the practice among urban dwellers. Infibulation, the most severe form of excision, was not practiced.

The government and international nongovernmental organizations continued in 2011 to coordinate their anti-FGM efforts, which were focused on eradicating the practice in hospitals, discouraging midwives from practicing FGM, and educating the population. The government, the United Nations Population Fund, the United Nations Children's Fund, and the national Imams' Association joined other civil society members to emphasize the serious health risks of FGM and correct the widespread belief that the practice was a religious requirement. Government hospitals and licensed medical practitioners were barred from performing FGM, and several government agencies worked to prevent others from perpetrating it. According to several women's rights experts, these efforts appeared to be changing popular attitudes.

==== Sexual exploitation of children ====
Mauritanian law prohibits adult sexual relations with a child, with penalties of six months to two years in prison and a 120,000 to 180,000 ouguiya (US$410 to $620) fine. The possession of child pornography is also illegal, with penalties of two months to one year in prison and a 160,000 to 300,000 ouguiya (US$550 to $1,034) fine. Commercial sexual exploitation of children is illegal, and conviction carries penalties of two to five years in prison and a fine of 200,000 to 2 million ouguiya (US$690 to $6,900). In some instances, men from the Middle East contracted "temporary marriages" as a means to traffic and exploit young Mauritanian girls and women in the Middle East.

==== Displaced children ====
Although the Ministry of Social Affairs, Children, and the Family monitored 900 of the estimated 1,200 street children in Nouakchott through its youth insertion centers in Dar Naim and El Mina, government assistance to street children in 2011 was limited. During the year, the local nongovernmental organization Infancy and Development in Mauritania monitored 760 children in Nouakchott and Nouadhibou who lived on the streets largely as a result of poverty and the urbanization of formerly nomadic families.

==== International child abductions ====
Mauritania is not a party to the 1980 Hague Convention on the Civil Aspects of International Child Abduction.

=== Anti-semitism ===
A very small number of expatriates practiced Judaism. There were no reports in 2011 of anti-Semitic acts.

=== Trafficking in persons ===
Mauritania is a source, transit, and destination country for women, men, and children subjected to conditions of forced labor and sex trafficking. Adults and children from traditional slave castes are subjected to slavery-related practices rooted in ancestral master-slave relationships. Reliable data on the total number of slaves do not exist, but according to the estimate of a respected Mauritanian nongovernmental organization (NGO), slavery may affect up to 20 percent of the population in both rural and urban settings. Held for generations by slave-holding families, persons subjected to slavery are forced to work without pay as cattle herders and domestic servants.

Some boys from within Mauritania and other West African countries who study at Koranic schools – referred to as "talibes" – are subsequently subjected to forced begging by corrupt religious teachers known as "marabouts".

Mauritanian girls, as well as girls from Mali, Senegal, The Gambia, and other West African countries, are forced into domestic servitude. Mauritanian women and girls are forced into prostitution in the country or transported to countries in the Middle East for the same purpose. Men from Middle Eastern countries use legally contracted "temporary marriages" as a means to sexually exploit young girls and women in Mauritania.

The government does not fully comply with the minimum standards for the elimination of trafficking, but it is making efforts to do so. The government acknowledges that some forms of trafficking are a problem in the country. For the first time in its history, in November 2011, the government successfully prosecuted and punished a slave-master under its 2007 anti-slavery law. In early 2011, the Parliament approved a constitutional provision criminalizing slavery and all forms of exploitation, equating them to crimes against humanity. In August, the government also enacted a new statute to strengthen the Labor Code governing the employment of domestic workers in private households. Despite these efforts, investigations and prosecutions in 2011 remained minimal and protective services for victims were inadequate.

All forms of trafficking, except hereditary slavery, are prohibited by Mauritania's 2003 Law Against Trafficking in Persons, which prescribes penalties of five to 10 years' imprisonment for violations. These penalties are sufficiently stringent and exceed those prescribed for rape.

Slavery, including hereditary slavery, is prohibited by Law 2007-048, which was enacted in September 2007. The law defines slavery and prescribes a sufficiently stringent penalty of five to 10 years' imprisonment for violations. The law's effectiveness remains impaired by its requirement that slaves file a legal complaint before prosecution can be pursued, as well as by its barring of NGOs from filing complaints on behalf of slaves. Many slaves are illiterate and unable to complete the paperwork involved in filing a criminal or civil complaint. In 2011, the government provided no support for programs to assist victims in filing complaints of slavery.

=== Persons with disabilities ===
Mauritanian law prohibits discrimination against persons with physical disabilities in education, employment, or the provision of other state services.

There were no reports in 2011 of governmental discrimination against persons with disabilities. However, persons with disabilities generally did not have access to buildings, information, and communications, and there were no government programs to provide such access. The government did not mandate preference in employment, education, or public accessibility for persons with disabilities, although it did provide some rehabilitation and other assistance for such persons.

=== National, racial, and ethnic minorities ===
Ethnic minorities faced governmental discrimination in 2011. The inconsistent issuance of national identification cards, which were required for voting, effectively disenfranchised many members of southern minority groups. Racial and cultural tension and discrimination also arose from the geographic and cultural divides between Moors and Afro-Mauritanians. The Moors are divided among numerous ethnolinguistic tribal and clan groups and further distinguished as either White Moor or Black Moor, although it was often difficult to distinguish between the two by skin color. White Moor tribes and clans, many of whom are dark-skinned after centuries of intermarriage with Berbers and sub-Saharan African groups, dominated positions in government and business. The Black Moors (also called haratines or freed slaves) remained politically and economically weaker than White Moors. Afro-Mauritanian ethnic groups, which include the Halpulaar (the largest non-Moor group), Wolof, and Soninke, are concentrated in the South and urban areas. Afro-Mauritanians were underrepresented in the government and military.

The Mauritanian constitution designates Arabic as the official language and Arabic, Pulaar, Soninke, and Wolof as the country's national languages. The government continued to encourage French and Arabic bilingualism within the school system, as opposed to earlier efforts at "Arabization". Neither the Afro-Mauritanian national languages nor the local Hassaniya Arabic dialect was used as languages of instruction.

Ethnic rivalry in 2011 contributed to political divisions and tensions. Some political parties tended to have readily identifiable ethnic bases, although political coalitions continued to be underrepresented in mid- to high-level public and private sector jobs.

There were numerous reports in 2011 of land disputes between former slaves, Afro-Mauritanians, and Moors. According to human rights activists and press reports, local authorities allowed Moors to expropriate land occupied by former slaves and Afro-Mauritanians or to obstruct access to water and pastures.

In 2011, human rights nongovernmental organizations (NGOs) reported numerous cases of inheritance disputes between slaves or former slaves and their masters. Traditionally, slave masters inherited their slaves' possessions.

The Mauritanian government's Program to Eradicate the Effects of Slavery, begun in 2009, continued during 2011. Its goals were to reduce poverty among the 44,750 former slaves in the Assaba, Brakna, Gorgol, and Hodh Ech Chargui regions and improve their access to water, health, education, and income-generating opportunities. However, the program's activities were reduced during 2011 after former human rights Commissioner Ould Daddeh was arrested and detained along with senior-level staff, including its coordinator and its financial director, on findings of corruption and bad management in a government inspection. NGOs maintained that the commissioner was arrested for political reasons.

The government also continued in 2011 its collaborative program with the United Nations on conflict prevention aimed at promoting democratic values and the rights of marginalized populations, including former slaves. According to the NGO SOS Esclaves, these programs focused on fighting poverty and the effects of slavery rather than the practice of slavery itself.

=== Societal abuses, discrimination, and acts of violence based on sexual orientation and gender identity ===
Under Shari'a, as applied in Mauritania, consensual same-sex sexual activity between men is punishable by death if witnessed by four individuals, and such activity between women is punishable by three months to two years in prison and a 5,000 to 60,000 ouguiya (US$17 to $207) fine. There were no criminal prosecutions during the year. There was no evidence of societal violence, societal discrimination, or systematic government discrimination based on sexual orientation. There were no organizations advocating for sexual orientation or gender-identity rights, but there were no legal impediments to the operation of such groups.

=== Other societal violence or discrimination ===
There was no evidence of governmental discrimination against persons with HIV/AIDS, but societal taboos and beliefs associated with the disease in some areas caused infected persons to face isolation or exclusion.

== Worker rights ==
=== Freedom of association and the right to collective bargaining ===
Mauritanian law allows workers to form and join independent unions of their choice and provides the right to conduct legal strikes and to bargain collectively, although long and complex procedures must be followed before a legal strike can be called. Workers and unions organized several strikes during 2011. International labor observers reported that authorities also repressed a number of strikes. The government can dissolve a union for what it considers an illegal or politically motivated strike, but it did not dissolve any unions during the year. Workers must provide advance notice of at least 10 working days for any strike. Workers are not allowed to hold sit-ins or to block nonstriking workers from entering work premises.

To be legally recognized, a union must have the authorization of the public prosecutor, who can provisionally suspend a trade union at the request of the Ministry of the Interior if the ministry believes that the union has not complied with the law.

Laws prohibit antiunion discrimination. Under the law, all workers except members of the armed forces and police were free in 2011 to associate in and establish unions at the local and national levels. In 2011, nearly 90 percent of industrial and commercial workers were unionized. However, only 25 percent of workers were employed in regularly paid positions. A majority worked in the informal sector, primarily subsistence agriculture and animal husbandry.

Unions exercised their right to organize workers during 2011. However, the head of government decides how negotiations are to be conducted once the Ministry for the Civil Service agrees on negotiations.

While antiunion discrimination is illegal, national human rights groups and unions reported that authorities did not actively investigate alleged antiunion practices in some private firms owned by very wealthy citizens.

=== Prohibition of forced or compulsory labor ===
The law prohibits forced or compulsory labor, including by children. The law criminalizes the practice of slavery and imposes penalties on government officials who do not take action on reported cases. The law includes criminal penalties also for contracting to benefit from forced labor and for exploiting forced labor as part of an organized criminal network. Although significant advances were made during 2011, government efforts to enforce the antislavery law were widely acknowledged to be inadequate when compared with the dimensions of the problem.

There were reports in 2011 of forced child labor.

Slavery-like practices, typically flowing from ancestral master-slave relationships and involving both adults and children, continued in 2011. Former slaves and their descendants were impelled to remain in a dependent status in part of a lack of marketable skills, poverty, and persistent drought. Such practices occurred primarily in areas where educational levels were generally low or a barter economy still prevailed, and in urban centers, including Nouakchott, where slavery-like domestic service existed. The practices commonly occurred where there was a need for workers to herd livestock, tend fields, and do other manual labor. Some former slaves and descendants of slaves were pushed into working for their old masters in exchange for some combination of money, lodging, food, and medical care. Individuals in these subservient circumstances were vulnerable to mistreatment. Women with children faced particular difficulties and could be compelled to remain in a condition of servitude, performing domestic duties, tending fields, or herding animals without remuneration.

Some former slaves reportedly continued to work in 2011 for their former masters or others without remuneration in order to retain access to land they traditionally farmed. Although the law provides for the distribution of land to the landless, including to former slaves, authorities have enforced it in only a few cases. Nongovernmental organization observers suggested that deeply embedded psychological and tribal bonds also made it difficult for many individuals whose forebears had been slaves for generations, to break their bonds with former masters or their tribes. Some persons continued to link themselves to former masters because they believed their slave status had been divinely ordained and they feared religious punishment if that bond were broken. Former slaves were often subjected to social discrimination and limited to performing manual labor in markets, ports, and airports.

Forced labor also occurred in 2011 in urban centers where young children, often girls, were retained as unpaid household servants. Some individuals self-identified as slaves or masters and claimed with varying degrees of plausibility that they were unaware that slavery had been abolished. Human rights groups reported that persons in slave-like relationships were persuaded by their masters to deny the relationship to activists.

In 2011, men, women, and children were trafficked for and subjected to domestic service, street begging for unscrupulous religious teachers, and slave-like relationships as domestic servants or herders. The law criminalizes the practice of slavery and imposes penalties on government officials who do not take action on reported cases.

On 13 April 2011, the government tried its first case under the antislavery law. The defendants were acquitted the same day. On 20 November, the first conviction for slavery was obtained in the case of two enslaved youths. The master received a sentence of two years' imprisonment, and his family members received suspended sentences. They were also ordered to pay a fine of 1.35 million ouguiya (US$4,655). The mother of the two youths received a one-year suspended sentence.

The government also prosecuted an alleged slaveholder using the lesser charge of child exploitation, and on 16 January 2011, a court convicted her and prescribed a jail sentence. In March, however, the Nouakchott Court of Appeals acquitted her.

=== Prohibition of child labor and minimum age for employment ===
The law provides that children cannot be employed before the age of 14 in the nonagricultural sector or under the age of 13 in the agricultural sector unless the minister of labor grants an exception due to local circumstances; however, child labor in the informal sector was a significant problem, particularly within poorer inner-city areas. The law states that employed children between the ages of 14 and 16 should receive 70 percent of the minimum wage and that those between the ages of 17 and 18 should receive 90 percent of the minimum wage.

The Ministry of Justice, working with UNICEF, worked to repatriate Mauritanian children who had been sent to work as camel jockeys in the United Arab Emirates. The ministry formally arranged the repatriation of 12 youths under the program and provided family counseling for the repatriated youths, plus additional youth who had previously worked as camel jockeys.

Young rural children were commonly employed in herding, cultivation, fishing, and other labor to support their families. Young children in urban areas often drove donkey carts and delivered water and building materials. Some marabouts provided their talibes with insufficient food and shelter and forced them to beg for over 12 hours a day. In keeping with longstanding tradition, many children served apprenticeships in small industries and in the informal sector. Reporting by some NGOs, including SOS‑Esclaves, strongly stated that domestic employment, often unpaid, of girls as young as seven in wealthier homes was a growing problem. There was no child labor in the modern industrial sector.

Several government offices have responsibility for enforcing child labor laws, including the ministries of labor; justice; women's, children's, and family affairs; and the Commission for Food Security and Social Protection. There was a labor inspectorate with the authority to refer violations to judicial authorities, but the eight regional inspectors and 30 inspector/controllers lacked the basic resources, such as transport and office equipment, needed to enforce existing child labor and other labor laws.

=== Acceptable conditions of work ===
The nationally mandated minimum monthly wage for adults, which was not enforced, was $77 (21,000 ouguiya), which did not provide a decent standard of living for a worker and family.

The standard, legal, nonagricultural workweek could not exceed either 40 hours or six days without overtime compensation, which was paid at rates that were graduated according to the number of overtime hours worked. Domestic and certain other workers could work 56 hours per week. Employees are required to be given at least one 24‑hour period of rest per week. The Labor Directorate of the Ministry of Labor is responsible for the enforcement of labor laws, but in practice inadequate funding limited the effectiveness of enforcement.

The government set health and safety standards, and the Ministry of Labor was responsible for enforcing these standards, but did so inconsistently. In principle, workers could remove themselves from hazardous conditions without risking loss of employment, but in practice, they could not.

== Freedom House ratings of Mauritania ==
The following chart shows Mauritania's ratings since 1972 in the Freedom in the World reports, published annually by Freedom House. A rating of 1 is "free"; 7, "not free".^{1}

Historical ratings

Year	Political Rights	Civil Liberties	Status	President^{2}
1972	6	6	Not Free	Moktar Ould Daddah
1973	6	6	Not Free	Moktar Ould Daddah
1974	5	6	Not Free	Moktar Ould Daddah
1975	6	6	Not Free	Moktar Ould Daddah
1976	6	6	Not Free	Moktar Ould Daddah
1977	6	6	Not Free	Moktar Ould Daddah
1978	6	6	Not Free	Mustafa Ould Salek
1979	7	6	Not Free	Mohamed Mahmoud Ould Louly
1980	7	6	Not Free	Mohamed Khouna Ould Haidalla
1981	7	6	Not Free	Mohamed Khouna Ould Haidalla
1982^{3}	7	6	Not Free	Mohamed Khouna Ould Haidalla
1983	7	6	Not Free	Mohamed Khouna Ould Haidalla
1984	7	6	Not Free	Mohamed Khouna Ould Haidalla
1985	7	6	Not Free	Maaouya Ould Sid'Ahmed Taya
1986	7	6	Not Free	Maaouya Ould Sid'Ahmed Taya
1987	6	6	Not Free	Maaouya Ould Sid'Ahmed Taya
1988	6	6	Not Free	Maaouya Ould Sid'Ahmed Taya
1989	7	6	Not Free	Maaouya Ould Sid'Ahmed Taya
1990	7	6	Not Free	Maaouya Ould Sid'Ahmed Taya
1991	7	6	Not Free	Maaouya Ould Sid'Ahmed Taya
1992	7	6	Not Free	Maaouya Ould Sid'Ahmed Taya
1993	7	6	Not Free	Maaouya Ould Sid'Ahmed Taya
1994	7	7	Not Free	Maaouya Ould Sid'Ahmed Taya
1995	6	6	Not Free	Maaouya Ould Sid'Ahmed Taya
1996	6	6	Not Free	Maaouya Ould Sid'Ahmed Taya
1997	6	6	Not Free	Maaouya Ould Sid'Ahmed Taya
1998	6	5	Not Free	Maaouya Ould Sid'Ahmed Taya
1999	6	5	Not Free	Maaouya Ould Sid'Ahmed Taya
2000	6	5	Not Free	Maaouya Ould Sid'Ahmed Taya
2001	5	5	Partly Free	Maaouya Ould Sid'Ahmed Taya
2002	5	5	Partly Free	Maaouya Ould Sid'Ahmed Taya
2003	6	5	Not Free	Maaouya Ould Sid'Ahmed Taya
2004	6	5	Not Free	Maaouya Ould Sid'Ahmed Taya
2005	6	4	Partly Free	Ely Ould Mohamed Vall
2006	5	4	Partly Free	Ely Ould Mohamed Vall
2007	4	4	Partly Free	Sidi Ould Cheikh Abdallahi
2008	6	5	Not Free	Mohamed Ould Abdel Aziz
2009	6	5	Not Free	Mohamed Ould Abdel Aziz
2010	6	5	Not Free	Mohamed Ould Abdel Aziz
2011	6	5	Not Free	Mohamed Ould Abdel Aziz
2012	6	5	Not Free	Mohamed Ould Abdel Aziz
2013	6	5	Not Free	Mohamed Ould Abdel Aziz
2014	6	5	Not Free	Mohamed Ould Abdel Aziz
2015	6	5	Not Free	Mohamed Ould Abdel Aziz
2016	6	5	Not Free	Mohamed Ould Abdel Aziz
2017	6	5	Not Free	Mohamed Ould Abdel Aziz

== International human rights treaties ==
Mauritania's stances on international human rights treaties are as follows:

International treaties

Treaty	Organization	Introduced	Signed	Accession, Ratification
Convention on the Prevention and Punishment of the Crime of Genocide	United Nations	1948	-	-
International Convention on the Elimination of All Forms of Racial Discrimination	United Nations	1966	1966	1988 (R)
International Covenant on Economic, Social and Cultural Rights	United Nations	1966	-	2004 (A)
International Covenant on Civil and Political Rights	United Nations	1966	-	2004 (A)
First Optional Protocol to the International Covenant on Civil and Political Rights	United Nations	1966	-	-
Convention on the Non-Applicability of Statutory Limitations to War Crimes and Crimes Against Humanity	United Nations	1968	-	-
International Convention on the Suppression and Punishment of the Crime of Apartheid	United Nations	1973	-	1988 (A)
Convention on the Elimination of All Forms of Discrimination against Women	United Nations	1979	-	2001 (A)
Convention against Torture and Other Cruel, Inhuman or Degrading Treatment or Punishment	United Nations	1984	-	2004 (A)
Convention on the Rights of the Child	United Nations	1989	1990	1991 (R)
Second Optional Protocol to the International Covenant on Civil and Political Rights, aiming at the abolition of the death penalty	United Nations	1989	-	-
International Convention on the Protection of the Rights of All Migrant Workers and Members of Their Families	United Nations	1990	-	2007 (A)
Optional Protocol to the Convention on the Elimination of All Forms of Discrimination against Women	United Nations	1999	-	-
Optional Protocol to the Convention on the Rights of the Child on the Involvement of Children in Armed Conflict	United Nations	2000	-	-
Optional Protocol to the Convention on the Rights of the Child on the Sale of Children, Child Prostitution and Child Pornography	United Nations	2000	-	2007 (A)
Convention on the Rights of Persons with Disabilities	United Nations	2006	-	2012 (A)
Optional Protocol to the Convention on the Rights of Persons with Disabilities	United Nations	2006	-	2012 (A)
International Convention for the Protection of All Persons from Enforced Disappearance	United Nations	2006	2011	2012 (R)
Optional Protocol to the International Covenant on Economic, Social and Cultural Rights	United Nations	2008	-	-
Optional Protocol to the Convention on the Rights of the Child on a Communications Procedure	United Nations	2011	-	-
African Charter on Human and Peoples' Rights	African Union	1981	1982	1986 (R)
Protocol to the African Charter on Human and People's Rights on the Rights of Women in Africa	African Union	2003	-	2005 (A)
African Charter on the Rights and Welfare of the Child	African Union	1990	-	2005 (A)
African Union Convention on Preventing and Combating Corruption	African Union	2003	2005	-
African Charter on Democracy, Elections and Governance	African Union	2007	2008	2008 (R)
African Union Convention for the Protection and Assistance of Internally Displaced Persons in Africa (Kampala Convention)	African Union	2009	-	-
African Youth Charter	African Union	2006	-	-
Hague Convention on the Civil Aspects of International Child Abduction	Hague Conference on Private International Law	1980	-	-

== See also ==
- Freedom of religion in Mauritania
- Human trafficking in Mauritania
- Politics of Mauritania
- Elections in Mauritania

== Notes ==
1.Note that the "Year" signifies the "Year covered". Therefore, the information for the year marked 2008 is from the report published in 2009, and so on.
2.As of January 1.
3.The 1982 report covers the year 1981 and the first half of 1982, and the following 1984 report covers the second half of 1982 and the whole of 1983. In the interest of simplicity, these two aberrant "year and a half" reports have been split into three year-long reports through interpolation.
