= List of conflicts in Mauritania =

Location of Mauritania in Africa.

== Medieval Times ==
=== Ghana Empire ===
- 647 — 709 Muslim conquest of the Maghreb
- 739 — 743 Berber Revolt
- c. 970 — c. 1240 Decline of the Ghana Empire
  - c. 1075 Almoravid conquest of the Ghana Empire

=== Mali Empire ===
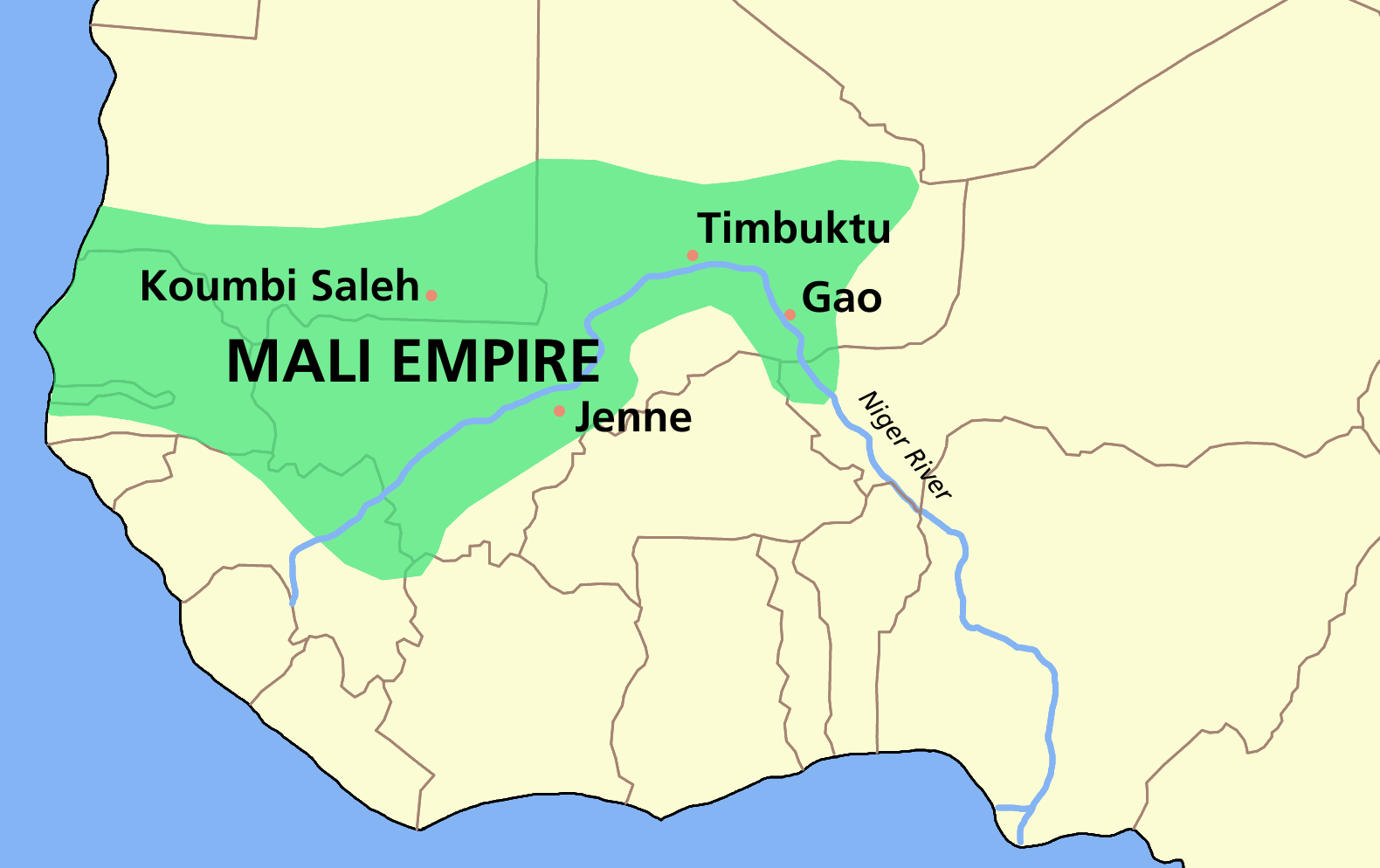
Extent of the Mali Empire (c. 1350)

- 1235 — 1230 Pre-imperial expansion
- 1235 — 1250 Early imperial expansion of the Mali Empire
- 1300 — 1337 The empire at its zenith
- 1337 — 1440 The fragmenting empire
- 1440 — 1490 The empire on the defensive
- 1500 — 1600 Collapse of the Mali empire

=== Songhai Empire ===
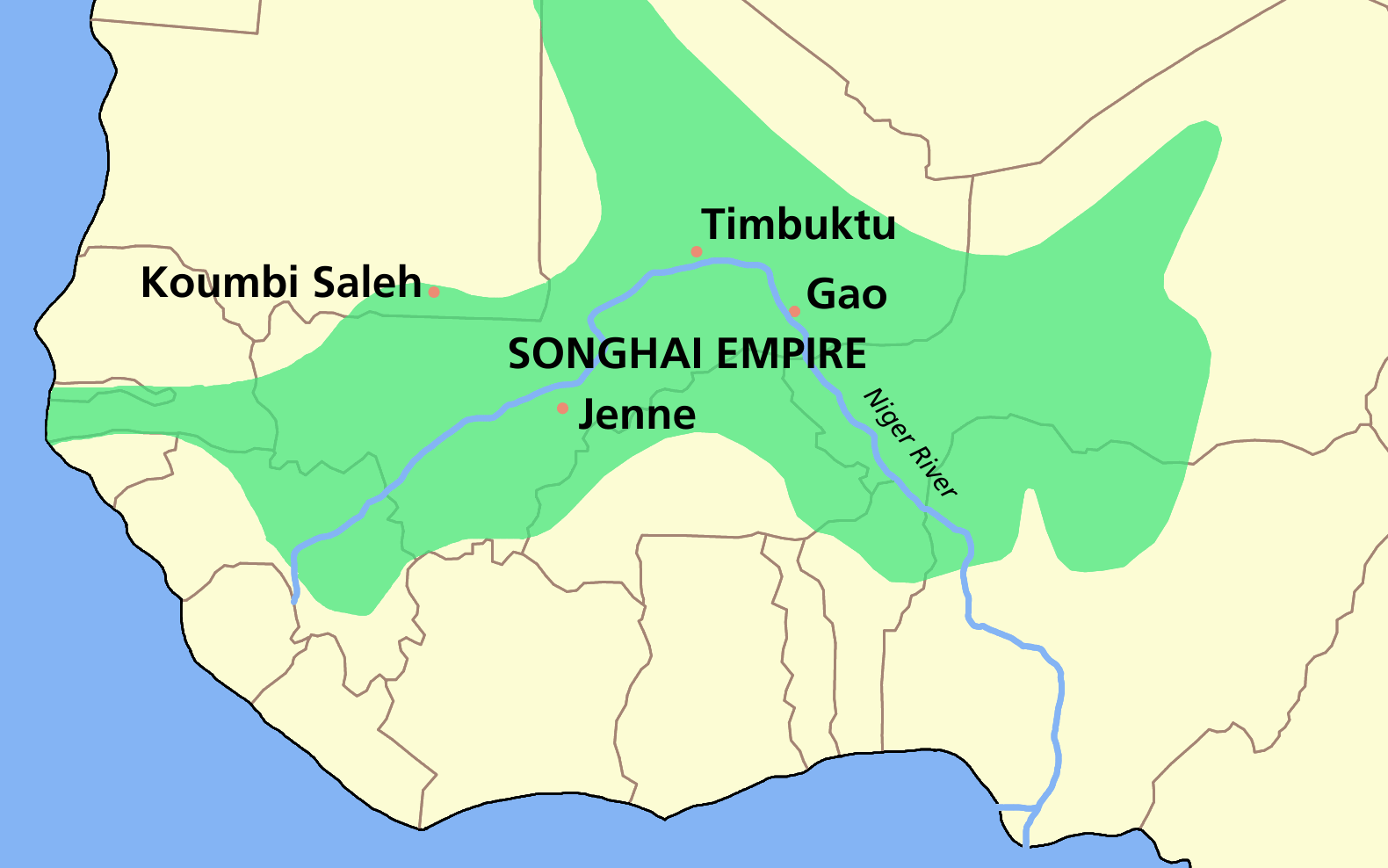
The Songhai Empire, (ca. 1500)

- 1440 — 1490 The Mali Empire on the Defensive
- 1500 — 1600 Collapse of the Mali Empire
- 1578 — 1603 Campaigns of Ahmad al-Mansur of the Saadi dynasty of Morocco

== Modern Times ==
=== Islamic Republic of Mauritania ===
- February 25, 2011 — 2012? Mauritanian protests.

== See also ==
- List of wars involving Mauritania
- Military of Mauritania
- Military history of Africa
- African military systems to 1800
- African military systems (1800–1900)
- African military systems after 1900
