= List of wars involving Mauritania =

This is a list of wars involving Mauritania.

Conflict	Mauritania and allies	Opponents	Results	President of Mauritania
Western Sahara War (1975–1979)	Mauritania; Morocco; France	Polisario	Defeat: Withdrawal from Tiris al-Gharbiyya.	Moktar Ould Daddah
Mauritania–Senegal Border War (1989–1991)	Mauritania	Senegal (Mauritania) FLAM	Indecisive: Peace agreement, end of skirmishes.	Maaouya Ould Sid'Ahmed Taya
Insurgency in the Maghreb (2002–)	Algeria; Morocco; Mauritania; Mali; Chad; France; Tunisia; Libya	al-Qaeda	Ongoing: Operation Enduring Freedom – Trans Sahara launched in 2007	Maaouya Ould Sid'Ahmed Taya

== See also ==
- Military of Mauritania
- 2005 Mauritanian coup d'état
- 2008 Mauritanian coup d'état
