= Human trafficking in Mauritania =

Human rights issue

In 2009 Human trafficking in Mauritania was considered to be a controversial human rights issue. Mauritania was a suspected source and destination country for men, women, and children subjected to trafficking in persons, specifically conditions of forced labor and commercial sexual exploitation. Supposedly, some women, men, and children from traditional slave castes were subjected to slavery-related practices, rooted in ancestral master-slave relationships, which continue to exist in a limited fashion in both rural and urban settings. These individuals, held for generations by slave-holding families, may have been forced to work without pay as cattle herders and household help. Mauritanian and West African boys - referred to as talibes - were recruited to study at Koranic schools, but were sometimes subsequently subjected to forced begging within the country by religious teachers known as marabouts. Girls have been trafficked internally and from neighboring West African countries such as Mali, Senegal, and Gambia for involuntary domestic servitude. Mauritanian girls have been married off to wealthy men from the Middle East and taken there in some cases for forced prostitution. Mauritanian women were forced into prostitution within the country, as well as in the Arab States of the Persian Gulf.

In 2009 the government of Mauritania did not fully comply with the minimum standards for the elimination of trafficking and is not making significant efforts to do so. The government did not show evidence of significant progress in prosecuting and punishing trafficking offenders, protecting trafficking victims, and preventing new incidents of trafficking. Despite its acknowledgment of trafficking as a problem, the government is reluctant to acknowledge that de facto slavery currently exists in Mauritania, and prefers to talk about "the consequences of slavery". The government has stated it is willing to take action, but does not have the necessary resources to fund needed services, such as shelters for trafficking victims, legal assistance, and training in life-skills and income generating activities. Certain government and civil society leaders have expressed a willingness to work with foreign partners to improve the country's human rights record; however, in 2009, prosecutions of forced labor or forced prostitution offenses were nonexistent, and no government programs were put in place to assist victims of such crimes.

The U.S. State Department's Office to Monitor and Combat Trafficking in Persons placed the country in "Tier 3" in 2017. By 2023 it was moved to Tier 2. As of 2024, the United States Department of State states that the government of Mauritania has made considerable efforts to stop trafficking, although it remains in Tier 2.

The country ratified the 2000 UN TIP Protocol in July 2005.

The National Action Plan to Fight Trafficking in Persons was adopted in March 2020. The plan involves prosecution of offenders, protection of the vulnerable, and prevention of the offence.

== Prosecution (2009) ==
The government did not demonstrate increased overall law enforcement efforts during the reporting period. Mauritanian law prohibits all forms of trafficking through its 2003 "Law Against Trafficking in Persons", which prescribes penalties of from five to 10 years' imprisonment. These penalties are sufficiently stringent and exceed those prescribed for rape. Slavery is prohibited by Law 2007-048, which was enacted in September 2007. The law's effectiveness, however, is hampered by its requirement that slaves file a legal complaint before a prosecution can be pursued, as well as its barring of NGOs from filing complaints on behalf of slaves. Many slaves are illiterate and unable to complete the paperwork involved in filing a complaint. According to the Ministry of Justice, there were neither investigations nor prosecutions of trafficking offenses, nor convictions or sentences of trafficking offenders in 2009. A local human rights organization reported that judges refused to investigate two child slavery cases brought to them during the year, either on slavery or child abuse grounds. The parties reached an informal agreement outside the court, and the children remained with their slave masters. The government provided no support for programs to assist victims systematically to file complaints on slavery.

== Protection (2009) ==
The Government of Mauritania demonstrated minimal efforts to protect victims of human trafficking, including of traditional slavery. In 2009, the government's National Center for the Protection of Children in Difficulty provided shelter for 270 children, including 60 talibes identified in Nouakchott, the capital. This center returned children to their families or imams, and asked for guarantees that the children would not be sent back to the streets to beg. Government-provided access to legal and medical services was very limited, and the government did not offer shelter or long-term housing benefits to victims aside from the aforementioned center for talibes. The government did not have a referral process in place to transfer victims who were detained, arrested, or placed in protective custody by law enforcement authorities to institutions that provided short- or long-term care. The government's law enforcement, immigration, and social services personnel did not have a formal system of proactively identifying victims of trafficking among high-risk persons with whom they came in contact. Illegal migrants were detained and placed in the Migrant Detention Center at Nouadhibou until their expulsion from the country, without the government making any effort to identify trafficking victims among them. Women suspected of prostitution were often jailed. The government made no attempts to screen these women for victimization. The government did not encourage victims to assist in the investigation and prosecution of human trafficking cases, and there were no precedents of victims filing civil suits or seeking legal action against trafficking offenders. In slavery cases, civil society representatives claimed that judges attempted to broker informal agreements between the masters and disgruntled slaves. Courts often dropped cases and avoided conducting investigations.

== Prevention (2009) ==
The Government of Mauritania made inadequate efforts to raise awareness of trafficking during the last year. In 2009, the government, in conjunction with civil society, conducted a public awareness campaign in local newspapers about the plight of domestic workers, and also about the 2007 anti-slavery law, as part of the government's "Program to Eradicate the Consequences of Slavery". The government did not monitor immigration and emigration patterns for evidence of trafficking. There was no mechanism for coordination and communication between various agencies on trafficking-related matters. In 2009 the government worked in association with an international organization to draft a National Action Plan to Fight Trafficking in Persons, to be released in 2010. The government made no efforts to reduce the demand for forced labor.

== See also ==
- Human rights in Mauritania
