= Aissa Mama Kane =

Senegalese nurse and politician

Soxna Aïcha Mama Kane is a Senegalese nurse and politician. She was a member of the National Assembly elected in March 2007.

== Biography ==
Coming from a Mauritanian–Helpulaar Tidiane family, Aissa Mama Kane attended the John Fitzgerald Kennedy high school, followed by the State Nursing School where she graduated in 1964.

On February 28, 1980, she married Béthio Thioune, who she met in 1974 in Kaolack where she was a nurse in a municipal dispensary and civil administrator before becoming the spiritual leader of thiantacounes.

Since her husband could not run, she was a candidate on the 2007 Sopi Coalition list supporting Abdoulaye Wade in the Senegalese legislative elections of 2007. She was elected as a member of the National Assembly for a term of 5 years. She returned to practice in a municipal clinic in Dakar and at the clinic in Medina.
