= Manifesto of the Oppressed Black Mauritanian =

1986 manifesto from Mauritania

The Manifesto of the Oppressed Black Mauritanian (French: Le Manifeste du Négro-Mauritanien Opprimé) was published in April 1986, by the African Liberation Forces of Mauritania (ex-FLAM) a paramilitary group which promoted the rights of the oppressed Black African majority by Arabo-Berber alleged "minority" in Mauritania. The manifesto details the racial discrimination against the Black African "majority" by the Arabic-speakers "minority" in Mauritania. It encouraged the black people of Mauritania to overthrow the military junta installed by Colonel Mohamed Khouna Ould Haidallah and establish an egalitarian regime.

== Contents ==
The Manifesto of the Oppressed Black Mauritanian was written in French, and mainly targeted the sympathy of non-Mauritanian audiences.

The manifesto focuses on the discrimination against Black African Mauritanians by the Arabic-speakers political elite. It documents the racial segregation in every sector of public life. The manifesto contains details about the discrimination against the Black population in the educational system, the army, the mass media and the judicial system. The manifesto urged the Black people of Mauritania to use any means necessary in order to overthrow the Arabophone military junta.

== Trial and effects of the Manifesto on Mauritania ==
In September 1986, the Arab military regime of Mauritania arrested thirty-six Mauritanians of Black African origin for the publication and the distribution of the forbidden manifesto. Twenty-one of them were brought to trial on charges of "undermining national unity" and "making propaganda of a racial or ethnic character". Among them were Ibrahima Moctar Sarr and many other prominent members of the academic life of Mauritania. Many of the accused individuals were subject to alleged torture during interrogation by the Mauritanian police.

The defendants were denied judicial defense and were allowed to contact lawyers only on the day of the trial. The trial was conducted in Arabic, although only three of the accused could understand or speak Arabic. During the trial all of the defendants pleaded not guilty, but all were convicted on all counts. The convictions varied from six-month to ten-year prison sentences, exile, and loss of civil rights.

In October 1986, ten other Black Africans were arrested on charges of organization of protests against the trial of September, of being members of the African Liberation Forces of Mauritania and of raising funds for the families of the defendants of the September trials. As a consequence the Arab military junta introduced and established the Islamic law, and increased the discrimination against the Black African community. In October 1987, fifty-one Black African officers were arrested on charges of insurrection and plotting a coup, three of which were executed after a military trial.
