= Ministry of Justice (Mauritania) =

The Ministry of Justice of Mauritania is responsible for sector Policy planning, Juvenile justice and Judicial reform, Drafting and distributing legislative texts, and Prison Administration.

== List of ministers (1970-present) ==
- Maloum Ould Braham (1970-1972)
- Abdullahi Ould Boye (1972-1975)
- Maloum Ould Braham (1976-1977)
- Cheikh Saad Bouh Kane (1978)
- Ba Ould Ne (1978-1979)
- Yadalli Ould Cheikh (1980)
- Abdel Aziz Ould Ahmed (1981-1984)
- Cheikh Ould Boide (1984)
- Djibril Ould Abdallahi (1985)
- Moulaye Ould Boukhreiss (1986)
- Hamdy Samba Diop (1986-1987)
- Cheikh Mohamed Salem Ould Mohamed Lemine (1988-1990)
- Sow Adama Samba Bohoum (1990-1992)
- Sow Abou Damba (1992-1995)
- Mohamed Lemine Salem Ould Dah (1996-1997)
- Mohamed Ould Mohamed Vall Sidi (1998)
- Mohamed Ould Ahmed Lemine (1998-2000)
- Sidi Mahmoud Ould Cheikh Ahmed Lemrabott (2000-2001)
- Sghair Ould M’Bareck (2001-2003)
- Diabira Bakary (2003-2005)
- Maafoudh Ould Bettah (2005-2007)
- Limam Ould Teguedi (2007-2008)
- Ahmedou Tidjane Bal (2008-2011)
- Abidine Ould Kheir (2011-2014)
- Sidi Ould Zeine (2014-2017)
- Brahim Ould Daddah (2017-2018)
- Dia Moctar Malal (2018-2019)
- Haimouda Ould Ramdane (2019-2020)
- Mohamed Mahmoud Ould Abdoullah Ould Boye (2020-present)

== See also ==
- Justice ministry
- Politics of Mauritania
