= Ibrahima Sarr =

Mauritanian journalist and politician

Ibrahima Moctar Sarr
- Ibrayma Muxtaar Saar

President of the AJD/MR
- In office 5 August 2007 – 20 January 2024
- Succeeded by: Mamadou Bocar Ba

Leader of the FLAM
- In office November 1983 – November 1989
- Preceded by: Party established
- Succeeded by: Party abolished

Personal details
- Born: 1949 (age 76–77) Boghé, Colony of Mauritania
- Party: AJD/MR (2007 - present)
- Other political affiliations: FLAM (1983 - 1989); Mauritanian Workers Party
- Occupation: Journalist, Politician

Ibrahima Moctar Sarr (Note: Serer: Ibrayma Muxtaar Saar; Arabic: إبراهيما مختار صار; Pulaar: Ibrahima Muktar Saar) (born 1949) is a Mauritanian journalist and politician of Serer origin. His surname Sarr, being one of the classic Serer patronyms. He is a co-founder and member of Alliance for Justice and Democracy/Movement for Renewal (AJD/MR). He was previously president of AJD/MR from 2007 until 2024.

== Biography ==
After studying in Cesti, Senegal, Sarr trained as a teacher before working in insurance. He became politically active in 1972, being a co-founder member of the Mauritanian Workers Party. Increasingly active as a journalist, he appeared regularly on radio and television. In 1983 he was a co-founder of the African Liberation Forces of Mauritania (ex-FLAM; Force pour la Liberation Africaine de Mauritanie), and in 1986 he was a communication specialist with FLAM when they published the second edition of the Manifesto of the oppressed black Mauritanian. Following this anti-racist publication, which highlighted alleged "racial practices" by the Mauritanian Government, many black leaders were arrested and thrown to jail. Ibrahima Moctar Sarr was sentenced to four years in jail.

In 1989, after being released from jail, Sarr left and resigned from FLAM and ceased all his political activities until the democratization process was started in 1992 by President Maaouya Ould Sid'Ahmed Taya. Sarr then joined the Popular Progressive Alliance (APP) under Messaoud Ould Boulkheir, becoming a leading member of the party. He later left the APP.

Sarr stood in the March 2007 presidential election on an anti-racist platform. In order to facilitate his candidacy, he founded the "Movement for National Reconciliation", although he stood as an independent. Claiming that "I am the candidate of the oppressed", he called for equal rights for Pulaar, Soninké and Wolof people alongside Moors, and the return of Mauritanian refugees from Senegal. Sarr came in fifth place with 7.95% of the vote in the election, and he backed Ahmed Ould Daddah for the second round.

Running as an independent candidate, he placed fifth in the March 2007 presidential election.

Sarr's Movement for National Reconciliation subsequently merged with the Alliance for Justice and Democracy (AJD), and at an extraordinary congress to ratify the merger on August 18–19, Sarr was elected as the leader of the new party, the AJD/MR.

Sarr said on May 10, 2008, that the AJD/MR would not participate in the government of Prime Minister Yahya Ould Ahmed El Waghef due to many policy differences.

Following the August 2008 military coup, Sarr and the AJD/MR expressed support for the military junta, and Sarr announced on April 11, 2009, that he would be a candidate in the controversial June 2009 presidential election, which was being organized by the junta and which opposition parties were planning to boycott. Sarr then said that "the conditions are there for a free poll" and that Mauritania did not have democracy under Abdallahi's presidency. The Constitutional Court approved four candidacies, including Sarr's, on April 28.
