= Mintata Mint Hedeid =

Mauritanian politician

Mintata Mint Hedeid is a Mauritanian politician. She was the Secretary of State for Women's Affairs of Mauritania from 2000 until 2003.

She was detained by the putschists during the failed military coup attempt in June 2003, along with other Mauritanian politicians like Head of the Supreme Court, Mahfoud Ould Lemrabott.
