= Dakar Accord =

Several agreements have been known as the Dakar Accord, due to being signed or agree in Dakar, Senegal.

== Guinea-Bissau 2005 ==
An agreement between the heads of various groups prior to internal elections.

== Chad and Sudan 2006 ==
The Dakar accord is a peace agreement between Chad and Sudan that was released to the public on 9 August 2006. The Accord, which came only weeks after the N'Djamena Agreement, signed on 26 July 2006, and a few months after the Tripoli Accord, signed on 8 February 2006, aimed to normalize ties and effectively end fighting between the Government of Chad, the Government of Sudan, the paramilitary Janjaweed, the UFDC rebel alliance, and other anti-Déby rebel groups.

Chadian President Idriss Déby and Sudanese President Omar al-Bashir met in Dakar, Senegal on 9 August to sign the document.

After visiting the Sudanese capital Khartoum from 3 – 6 August 2006, Senegalese President Abdoulaye Wade said he hoped "the Dakar accord establishes a definitive peace between Chad and Sudan as well as in the region. I think that we can obtain this... If they talk to each other, no one will be able to divide them. I hope I will leave from [Khartoum] with positive results on the relations between Chad and Sudan, results which we will consolidate in Dakar." On 8 August, both nations announced they will immediately reopen their embassies in the two countries.

== 2009 ==
The 2009 accord involved Mauritania and was signed 4 June 2009.
