= Mauritanians in Senegal =

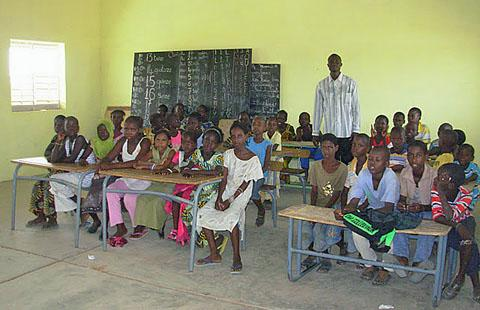
- In this November 2011 photo, Mauritanian refugee students at Thiabakh elementary school sit in the classroom in Ndioum Arrondissement, Podor Department, Saint-Louis Region, Senegal.

Total population
- 16,693

Regions with significant populations
- Dagana · Podor · Matam · Bakel

Religion
- Sunni Islam

There is a large community of Mauritanians in Senegal, including tens of thousands of black Mauritanians expelled by their own government during a 1989 border incident.

== Migration history ==
In early 1989, tensions arose between Mauritania and Senegal due to conflicts over water resources in the Sénégal River valley. As a result, white Mauritanian Moors in the Senegalese capital Dakar became the targets of communal violence, while in Mauritania itself, black Mauritanians came under suspicion as "Senegalese fifth columnists".

To prevent further violence, the governments of Mauritania and Senegal began to organize mutual repatriations of their citizens from each other's territories in April that year; however, Mauritania did not just remove Senegalese citizens, but an estimated 70,000 black Mauritanians as well. Those expelled were largely of Halpulaar ethnicity. The border between the two countries would not be reopened until April 1992.

Repatriation began slowly after the reopening of the border. Refugees returning to Trarza and Brakna generally found conditions to be good, but those going back to Gorgol and Guidimaka complained of continued discrimination by local authorities.

Reports in early 2013 indicated that returnees continued to face difficulties resettling in their former villages and regaining access to the lands they had once farmed due to their lack of identification documents.

== Bibliography ==
- El Yessa, Abderrahman (2009), Le retour des réfugiés mauritaniens au Sénégal et au Mali, vingt ans après la crise de 1989 (PDF), CARIM Rapports de recherche, Consortium Euro-Mediterraneen pour la recherche appliquee sur les migrations internationales, archived from the original (PDF) on July 20, 2011
- Marty, Marianne (2003), "Sociologie politique d'un mouvement de réfugiés: les réfugiés halpulaaren mauritaniens au Sénégal", in Coquery-Vidrovitch, Catherine; Goerg, Odile; Mandé, Issiaka; et al. (eds.), Politiques migratoires et construction des identités, Être étranger et migrant en Afrique au XXe siècle, vol. 1, Harmattan, pp. 497–518, ISBN 978-2-7475-5339-1
- Stone, David (June 2005), Enhancing livelihood security among Mauritanian refugees in Northern Senegal: a case study (PDF), United Nations High Commissioner for Refugees, OCLC 74115297
