= African Liberation Forces of Mauritania =

Paramilitary organization in Mauritania

- Forces de Libération Africaines de Mauritanie
- Flag of the FLAM
- Leaders: Ibrahima Moctar Sarr (November 1983 – 1989)
- Dates active: November 1983 – May 1992
- Headquarters: Dakar (main HQ); Paris (European HQ)
- Active regions: Mauritania, Senegal, Mali
- Ideology: Black African Mauritanian liberation
- Wars: Mauritania–Senegal Border War
- Website: www.flamnet.info

The African Liberation Forces of Mauritania (French: Forces de Libération Africaines de Mauritanie; abbreviated FLAM) was a political and paramilitary organization of Black African Mauritanians.

== Foundation ==
FLAM was founded in 1983 (co-founded by Ibrahima Moctar Sarr) as tensions had increased between the two ethnicities following severe political repression, instability and a controversial land reform enacted under Col. Mohamed Khouna Ould Heidalla's military government. The group endorsed, but did not initiate, a violent overthrow of the regime, and was quickly outlawed. In 1986, it published the Manifesto of the Oppressed Black Mauritanian, which detailed Government discrimination, and demanded the overthrow of the "Beidane System" (Beidane is an Arabic language-appellation for the Arabophone Moorish elite). Acting as an underground and illegal movement in Mauritania, with its main areas of strength in the southern areas of the country (bordering Senegal and Mali), and especially among the Helpulaar population, FLAM's leadership was headquartered in Dakar and Paris. It remained committed to destroying the "Beidane System", accusing Mauritania's Moorish-dominated governments of instituting a form of "apartheid", and engaged in sporadic, small-scale guerrilla operations in the south of the country.

== 1989 events ==
Tensions between the group and Heidalla's successor President Maaouya Ould Sid'Ahmed Taya increased to a peak in April 1989, when a border dispute with southern neighbor Senegal led to widespread ethnic violence in the racially mixed border areas, as well as a collapse in bilateral relations and intermittent military skirmishing between the two countries. In these so-called "1989 events", thousands of Black Mauritanians (mostly of the Helpulaar minority) were forced across the Senegal River; Moors in Senegal fled the opposite way. FLAM received and organized the Mauritanian refugees in Senegal, which bolstered the strength of the movement. With Senegalese backing, the movement intensified its armed struggle with continuous cross-border raids in the Senegal River valley. Violence would not dissipate until 1991–92. Most of the refugees subsequently returned, but over 20,000 Black Mauritanian refugees remained in Senegal, and the events made a lasting mark on the Mauritanian-Senegalese relations.

== After the 2005 transition ==
Following the coup d'état of Col. Ely Ould Mohamed Vall in August 2005, the transitional junta stated that the coming elected government would handle the question of resettlement of the refugees once in power. In anticipation of the promised changes, a reformist wing of the FLAM (FLAM-Renovation) split off from the main organization to participate in Mauritania's political transition. The main branch of FLAM has not returned to the country, awaiting settlement of outstanding issues which would, in its view, allow it to play a meaningful part in the political process. The government of Sidi Ould Cheikh Abdallahi, elected in 2007, began preparations to receive the remaining refugees with UNHCR assistance during the summer of that year.
