= Mahfoud Ould Lemrabott =

Mauritanian judge (died 2013)

Mahfoud Ould Lemrabott was the Head of the Supreme Court of Mauritania. He died on 11 May 2013.
