= List of conflicts in Angola =

Map showing the present-day location of the Republic of Angola within Southern Africa

This is a list of conflicts in Angola arranged chronologically from the early modern period to the present day. This list includes nationwide and international wars, including: wars of independence, liberation wars, colonial wars, undeclared wars, proxy wars, territorial disputes, and world wars. Also listed might be any battle that occurred within the territory of what is today known as the, "Republic of Angola" but was itself only part of an operation of a campaign in a theater of a war. There may also be periods of violent civil unrest listed, such as: riots, shootouts, spree killings, massacres, terrorist attacks, and civil wars. The list might also contain episodes of: human sacrifice, mass suicide, massacres, and genocides.

== Early modern period ==
=== Kingdom of Kongo ===
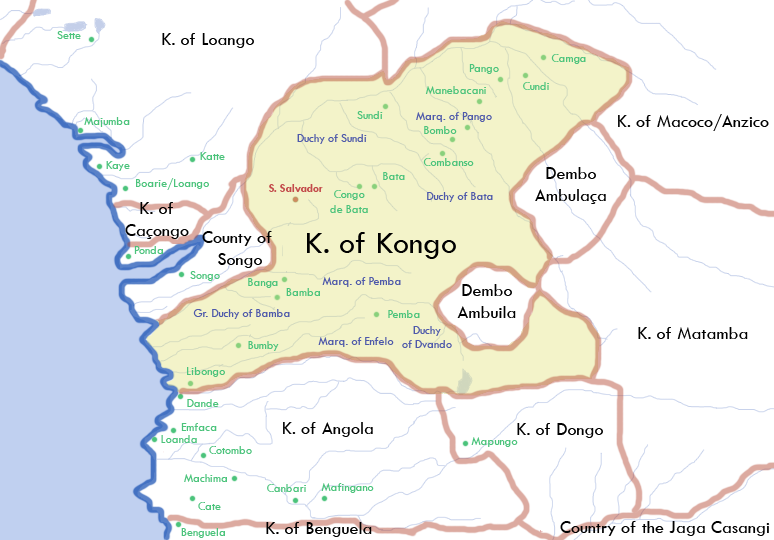
Map showing the capital city, "M'banza-Kongo" (written here as S. Salvador) of the Kingdom of Kongo in the year 1711, located within the territory of what is today known as the "Republic of Angola"

- c. 1506 – c. 1543 Afonso I of Kongo's Rise to Power
  - 1506 Battle of Mbanza Kongo
- 1588–1654 Dutch–Portuguese War
  - 29 October 1647 Battle of Kombi
- 1622 Kongo-Portuguese War
  - 18 December 1622 Battle of Mbumbi
- 1665–1709 Kongo Civil War
  - 30 October 1665 Battle of Mbwila
  - June 1670 Battle of Mbidizi River
  - 18 October 1670 Battle of Kitombo
  - 15 February 1709 Battle of São Salvador

=== Kingdom of Matamba ===
- 4 September 1681 Battle of Katole

== Contemporary history ==
=== Portuguese Angola ===
- 4 February 1961 – 25 April 1974 Angolan War of Independence
- 11 November 1975 – 4 April 2002 Angolan Civil War
  - September 1987 – March 1988 Battle of Cuito Cuanavale
- 8 November 1975 – Present Cabinda War

== See also ==
- Angolan Armed Forces
- Angolan Army
- Angolan Navy
- National Air Force of Angola
- Military history of Africa
- African military systems up until the year 1800 CE
- African military systems between the years 1800 CE and 1900 CE
- African military systems after the year 1900 CE
