= Battle of Mbidizi River =

1670 battle

- Part of the Kongo Civil War
Date	June 1670
Location	Mbidizi River, Angola
Result	Portuguese victory

Belligerents
Soyo and Ngoyo	Portuguese Empire

Commanders and leaders
Count Estêvão Da Silva; Prince Paulo Da Silva †	Commander João Soares de Almeida

Strength
Unknown number of musketeers heavy infantry and bowmen 4 Dutch light field pieces	Unknown number of irregular bowmen Unknown number of auxiliary Imbangala; 400-500 Portuguese musketeers 4 light cannons and a detachment of cavalry

Casualties and losses
Unknown but included Paulo Da Silva	Unknown but reportedly light

The Battle of Mbidizi River was a military engagement in June 1670 between forces of the County of Soyo and those of the Portuguese colony of Angola during the Kongo Civil War. The engagement was part of a military campaign to break the power of Soyo in the region. The Portuguese won a decisive victory, inflicting heavy casualties and killing the Soyon leader.

== Pre-battle situation and the Kongo Civil War ==
In 1665 the Kingdom of Kongo clashed with their one-time allies the Portuguese at the Battle of Mbwila. The engagement resulted in a crushing Portuguese victory ending in the death of the Mwenekongo António I and most of the kingdom's nobility. Afterwards, Kongo erupted in a brutal civil war between the House of Kinlaza, which had ruled under the dead king, and the House of Kimpanzu.

Soyo, home to many Kimpanzu partisans, was eager to take advantage of the chaos. Within a few months of the national tragedy at Mbwila, the Prince of Soyo invaded the capital of São Salvador and installed his protégé, Afonso II on the throne. This happened again in 1669 with the placement of Álvaro IX on the throne. By this time both the Portuguese and the central authorities in Kongo were growing tired of Soyo's meddling. While the Kinlaza and others in Kongo lived in fear of a Soyo invasion, the governor of Luanda was afraid of the growing power of Soyo. With access to Dutch merchants willing to sell them guns and cannons plus diplomatic access to the Pope, Soyo was on its way to becoming as powerful as Kongo had been before Mbwila. Committing to the unthinkable, the weak central authority in Kongo asked Luanda to invade Soyo. In return, Portugal was promised money, mineral concessions and the right to build a fortress in Soyo to keep out the Dutch.

== Engagement ==
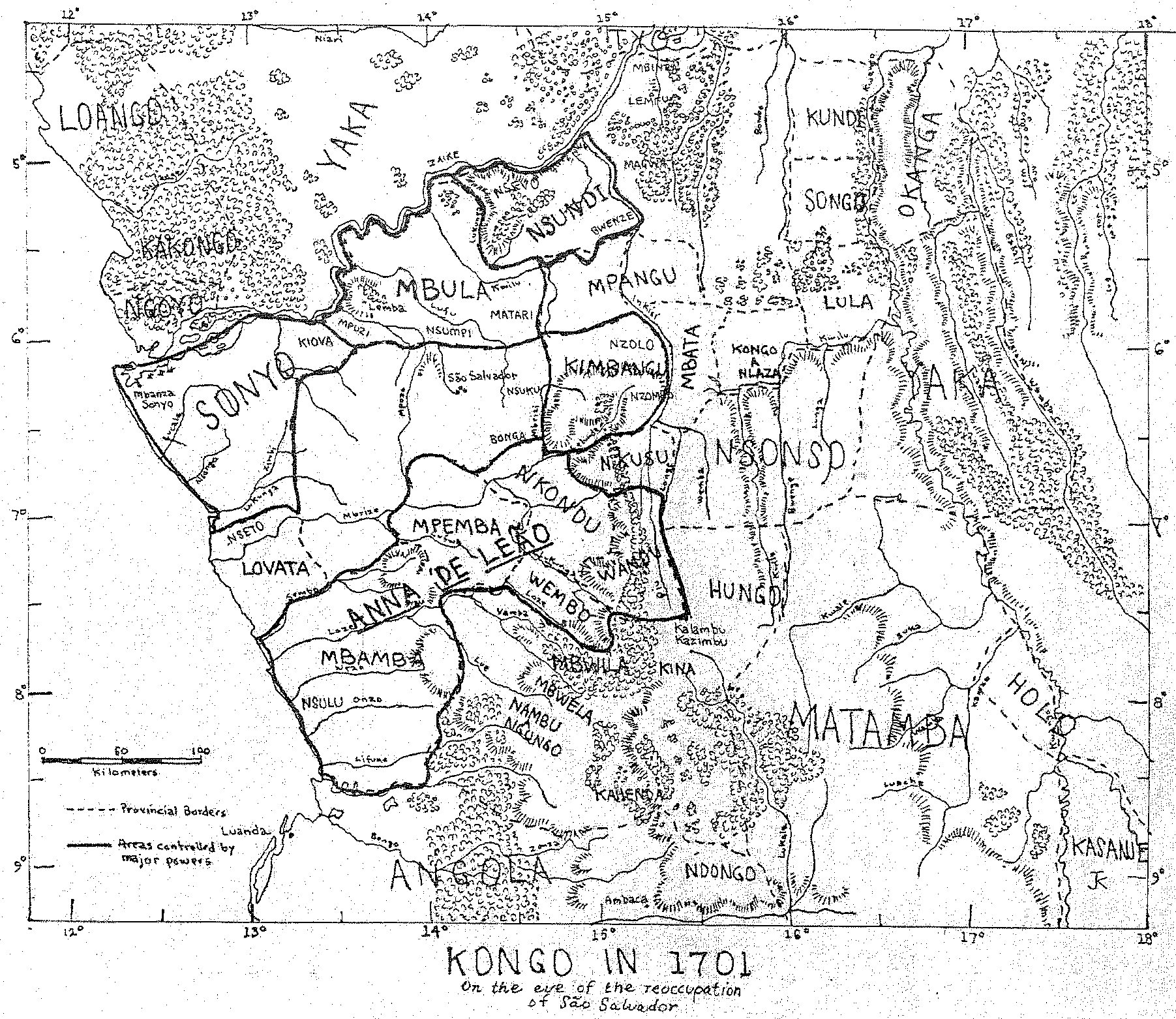
The Kingdom of Kongo showing major factions in the civil war

Responding to a plea by King Rafael I, a Portuguese colonial army from Luanda was dispatched to conquer Kongo's rebel province of Soyo in June 1670. The Count of Soyo Estêvão da Silva and his brother Prince Paulo da Silva moved with a force of BaKongo musketeers intermixed with heavy infantry holding the shields for which BaKongo soldiers were famous to meet the force.

The armies met just north of the Mbidizi River. The Portuguese were immediately successful, just as they had been in earlier engagements against Kongo at Mbwila and Mbumbi. The Portuguese use of grapeshot inflicted many casualties on the Soyo army and forced them to retreat. Paulo da Silva was among the dead. Enthused by their victory, the Portuguese captured the enemies' shields and marched further anticipating further combat at another location and hoping for a chance to show off their own talents in swordsmanship.

== Aftermath ==
The Portuguese advanced deeper into Kongo where they were met and defeated by Soyo at the Battle of Kitombo.

== See also ==
- Kongo Civil War
- Battle of Kitombo
- Soyo
- History of Angola
- Angolan Wars
