= African military systems before 1800 =

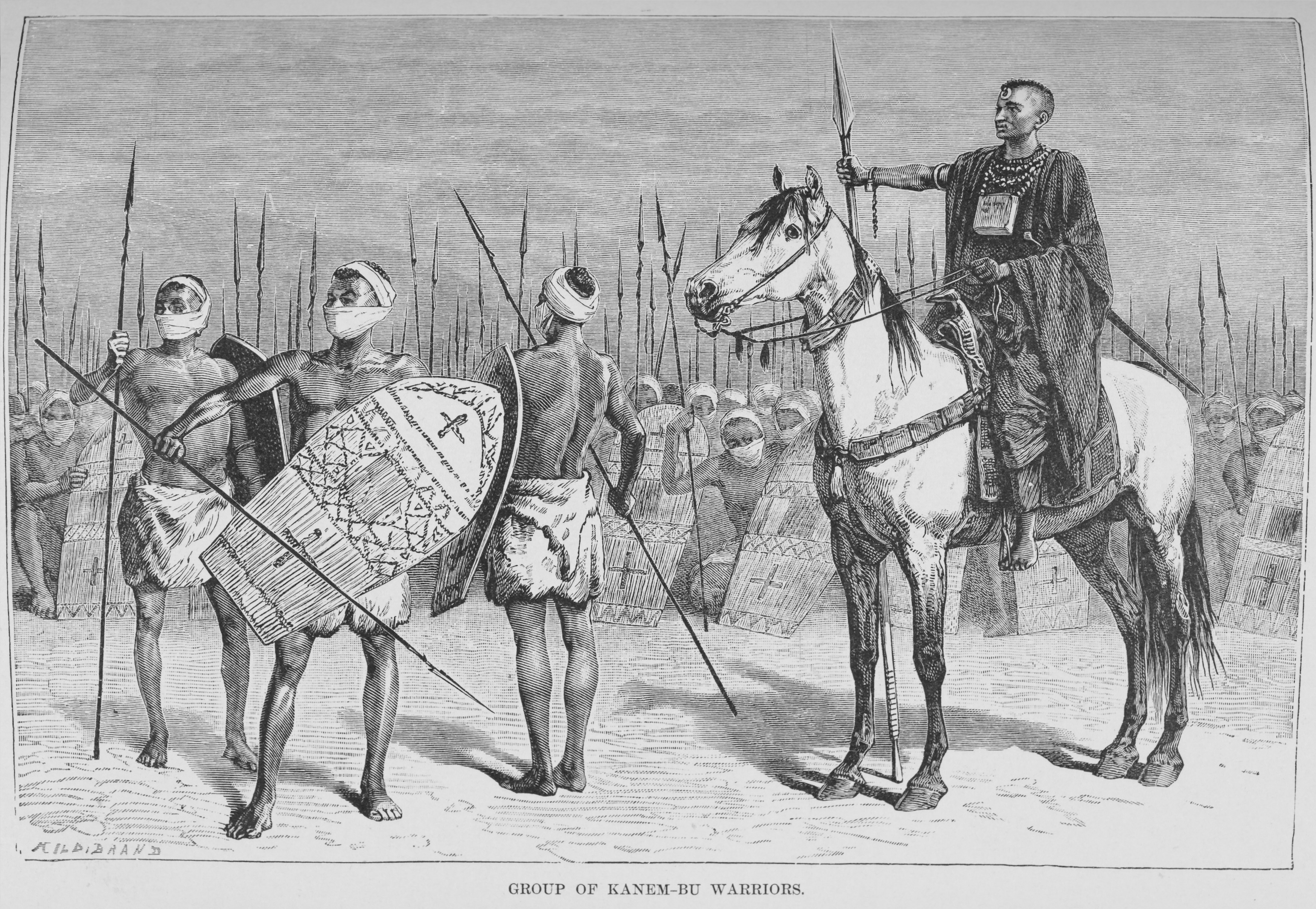
Kanembu warriors

African military systems before 1800 refers to the evolution of military systems on the African continent prior to 1800, with emphasis on the role of indigenous states and peoples, whose leaders and fighting forces were born on the continent, with their main military bases, fortifications, and supply sources based on or deriving from the continent, and whose operations were conducted within the continental mass or close to its borders or coasts. Development of the military arts in this framework generally moved from the simple to the more sophisticated as economies and cultures became more elaborate. Areas such as Carthage, Egypt and Nubia are reflected in the antiquarian period. The pre-colonial period also saw a number of military systems- from cavalry empires on the grasslands, to kingdoms in more tropical and forested areas. The emergence of the gunpowder era, alongside developments in indigenous organization and culture, was to spark far-reaching consequences cutting across all regions, with ripple effects in culture, politics and economies.

All of these patterns form the continuum that is African warfare. Due to the massive number of different peoples and regions, only major military systems or armies and their development before 1800 are covered here- using the military activities of certain selected peoples or events to illustrate how military systems and innovations have developed on the continent.

For events of the 19th century see African military systems (1800–1900). Coverage of the 20th century and beyond is illustrated in African military systems after 1900. For an overall view of the military history of Africa by region, see Military history of Africa. See individual battles, empires and leaders for details on other military activities in Africa.

== Military change and the African environment ==
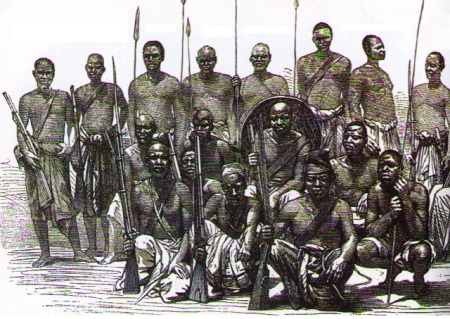
Environmental factors, indigenous development, and the flow of outside technology all influenced the evolution of military systems. Here, firearms, spears and bows are shown co-existing side by side.

As historian John Thornton notes, the environment determined the type of military deployed by African states. Such observations on the African environment also appear in several standard histories on African cultures and economies, including the development of states and their militaries. The African environment, especially in the Saharan region and southwards, also hinders development of certain economic and technological engines critical to large-scale military operations. These barriers include:

- The tsetse fly disease belt- which decimates horses, people and load-bearing animals,
- Lack of good natural harbors- hindering timely and/or movement of technology, men, and material inland
- Lack of good navigable rivers for moving mass cargo, rivers too often blocked by cataracts, sandbars and waterfalls
- Poor soils (outside areas like the Nile Valley) that limited the massive grain agriculture needed to support large armies.

All of these factors impact huge swathes of Africa, with corresponding effects on indigenous military systems and the numbers available for battle. This environment, however, did not prevent the development of elaborate and sophisticated civilizations and states on the continent, although it was to impact its military systems, just as other environments elsewhere in the world shaped local and regional cultures. Military innovation and change in Africa also reflects the internal dynamism of the continent's peoples, political organization and culture. Like other regions of the world, this pattern sometimes proceeded in both revolutionary and incremental fashion.

== Antiquity ==
Lack of written records from ancient times on Africa hinder understanding of early developments. The empires of Egypt and Carthage however, illustrate the growth of indigenous military systems on the continent. Both peoples drew massive amounts of fighting men and resources from African soil, and their leaders and populations were born on that soil. They also show the effects of innovation and transformation in the antiquarian era, including the process of copying and borrowing between cultures.

=== The fighting forces of Egypt and Nubia ===
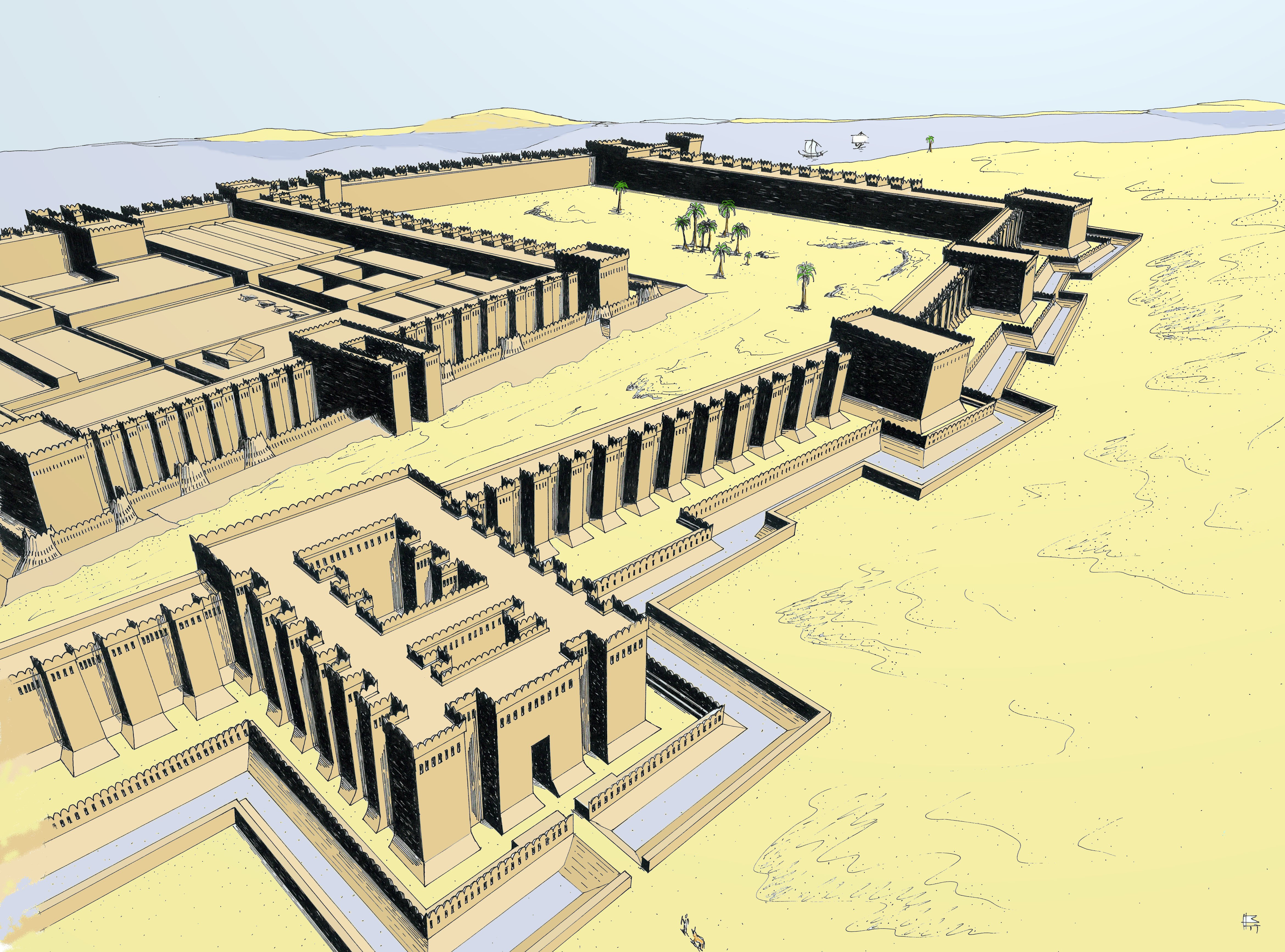
Powerful fortifications like this one were built to guard against invasion and rebellion in Nubia, and control the area's rich resources, particularly gold. Some walls measured 24 feet thick, and were garrisoned by both Nubians and Egyptians over the span of history.

Ancient Egyptian warfare shows a progression from the simple to the more complex as Egypt's culture and material civilization developed. Indigenous developments were at times supplemented by important innovations from outside sources. These strands of growth were further refined internally into what was to become a formidable war-machine. In the Old Kingdom, weapons ranged from simple bows and arrows with stone and copper arrowheads, to spears, daggers and copper axes for close-in fighting. Tactics, in terms of maneuvering large bodies of men appear fairly basic. As in other parts of Africa, archers generally opened the battle, followed by masses of infantry in a general hand-to hand engagement. Such methods, however, did unify the territory, ushering in the era of the dynasties under hegemons from the south.

During the Middle Kingdom military sophistication and strength continued to expand. Well-organized expeditions into Nubia were conducted, and a number of fortresses were built to control Nubian territory, such as the works at Buhen. Deep ditches surrounded some of these fortifications, with walls up to 24 feet thick, creating strong bases against rebellion or invasion. Recruiting quotas were assigned on a regional basis and designated scribes drafted soldiers as needed for the armies of the state. Striking forces were still primarily infantry-based, and tactics did not change drastically from previous eras. A key role in the strengthening of Egyptian forces was played by infantrymen from Nubia, both as spearmen and archers. Parts of Nubia were renowned for such fighting men, and indeed a part of the Nubian territory was called Ta-Seti or Land of the Bow by the Egyptians. The Egyptians and Nubians were ethnically the closest in the region, frequently exchanging people, genes, resources and culture over several centuries, and occasionally engaging one another in military conflict. Nubian fighting men were also sought as mercenaries by various kingdoms of Southwest Asia, according to the Amarna letters.

Over the centuries, archers and spearmen plied their trade in the Egyptian forces, and rendered good service against such foreign enemies such as the Hyksos. They also served in an internal security, policing role within Egypt itself, both in Upper Egypt, adjoining Nubia and further north. Egyptian officials frequently requested the services of such men, particularly the archers, or pitati, to provide security and defense. Such activity, however, was not always one way. While Egypt conquered large parts of Nubia at various times, the Kushite 25th Dynasty, originating in Nubia, was to conquer Egypt itself, drawing upon the archery skills of the region's bowmen. One ancient inscription by Weni the Elder, a royal court official and army commander states a recruitment of thousands of Nubian troops:

"When his majesty took action against the Asiatic sand-dwellers, his majesty made an army of many tens of thousands from all of Upper Egypt: ...; from Lower Egypt: ...; and from Irtjet-Nubians, Medja-Nubians, Yam-Nubians, Wawat-Nubians, Kaau-Nubians; and from Tjemeh-land."

Mercenary soldiers had fairly high status: Egyptian wives and servants are documented for Nubian mercenaries at Gebelein in the First Intermediate Period, and mercenaries were sometimes important in the dissemination of weapons and techniques of warfare, and advanced weapons such as the composite bow. Morkot (2003) notes a dissemination of war technology across the Nile Valley. "Nubia, too, must have benefited from the international arms trade. Although battle scenes show Nubian enemies conventionally as bowmen with relatively little equipment, other sources show the use of chariots by the elite, and the "tribute" scenes show weaponry and armor that was manufactured in Nubia... the inclusion of chariots as part of the Kushite tribute to Egypt suggests that they, too, were eventually being manufactured in Nubia itself".

Egyptian arms were sometimes sorely pressed by another great power of the Nile Valley, the kingdom of Kush, in what is now the northern Sudan. The Kushites almost destroyed Egypt as early as the 17th Dynasty era (circa 1575–1550 BC) according to a 2003 report by Egyptologists of the British Museum, deciphering inscriptions in the tomb of Sobeknakht, a Governor of El Kab, an important provincial capital during the latter part of the 17th Dynasty. According to V. Davies, Director of the Department of Ancient Egypt and the Sudan: “[Kush] swept over the mountains, over the Nile, without limit.. Had they stayed to occupy Egypt, the Kushites might have eliminated it. That's how close Egypt came to extinction. But the Egyptians were resilient enough to survive, and shortly afterwards inaugurated the great imperial age known as the New Kingdom. The Kushites weren't interested in occupation. They went raiding for precious objects, a symbol of domination. They did a lot of damage.” As the Dynastic civilization grew, Egyptian arms were to also expand into nearby territory of the Philistines, and Nubian and Egyptian fighting men helped establish camps and way stations in northern Sinai, and settlements in southern Philistine tribal lands.

The conquest of Egypt by the Semitic Hyksos was to usher in significant changes. Hyksos technology was superior to that of the Egyptians, including more durable weapons of bronze (rather than the weaker copper), body armor, scimitars, and most devastatingly, the horse drawn chariot. The Egyptians suffered defeat and the Hyksos era saw a century of foreign rule beginning in 1640BC although the Egyptians still retained control of southern or Upper Egypt. Mobilization of traditional weapons and fighting units reversed the Hyskos triumph including the campaigns of Seqenenre Tao (who died as a result of combat or capture) and the decisive military initiatives of his son and successor Kamose, which rolled back the Hyksos northward, and ravaged a merchant fleet beneath the walls of their capital Avaris. Building upon these successes, the final conquest of the Hyksos was completed by Ahmose I, who ushered in the 18th Dynasty, and the New Kingdom. While traditional forces defeated the Hyksos, two new weapons traceable to Hyksos influence- the composite bow and the chariot appear for the first time in widespread use of the Egyptian Army, and the Egyptians quickly adapted these, as the New Kingdom gained in power. This period saw new heights in Egyptian military sophistication and prowess. Recruitment methods were refined. Central armories were established that issued standardized bows, quivers, shields and spears to troops. Under the Pharaoh Ahmose I, well-organized and intense training was carried out, including archery practice and instruction on the proper handling and use of the chariots. Along with chariots, the more powerful and lethal composite bow was increasingly adopted. Documentation from the tomb of a Nubian royal official called Maiherpri from the 18th Dynasty shows that Nubian troops maintained their reputation for archery into this period. Armed even in death, the Nubian's funerary equipment includes arrows, bows, quivers and leather wrist guards. Units of other peoples such as Syrians, Libyans and Medjay also were incorporated into the Egyptian forces. These developments set the stage for the expulsion of the Hyksos and the re-conquest of territory. Ahmose's anti-Hyksos strategy also shows a new sophistication. He first cut Hyksos lines of communication between their base at Avaris and Canaan by taking the city of Tjaru. With this in hand he began a squeeze on Avaris, taking the city after 4 attacks. Further campaigning in Gaza put paid to Hyksos hegemony in Egypt permanently.

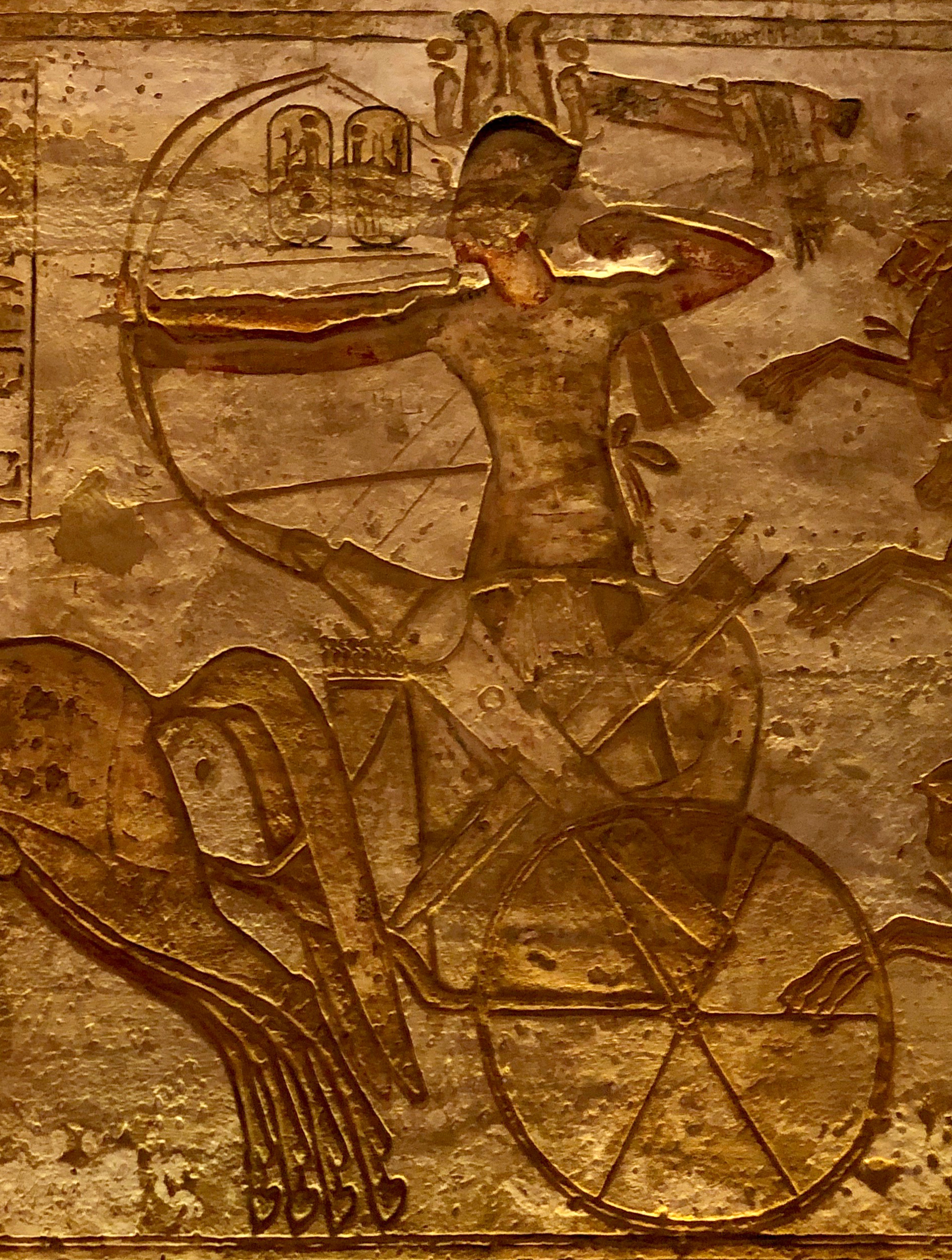
Ramses II fighting from a chariot at the Battle of Kadesh with two archers, one with the reins tied around the waist to free both hands (relief from Abu Simbel)

The campaigns of Pharaoh Thutmose III continued Egypt's great military rise. Infantry formations were better trained, led and armed. They were usually organized into basic sub-units of 50 fighters, progressing to divisions of around 5,000 men. Archers were better integrated with footmen. The chariot arm was expanded, and generally reserved for the nobility. Each vehicle carried two men, a driver maneuvered while carrying a huge shield to protect himself and his partner, an assault trooper armed with a powerful composite bow and bronze-tipped arrows provided firepower and a dozen javelins were also carried on board the chariot for close-range work. Behind the chariots came the infantry – solid ranks of spearmen and archers. The archers took the enemy under fire to open combat, while the chariot teams maneuvered around the flanks or across the enemy front. The chariots usually engaged in stand-off battle with arrows against opposing chariots or infantry, or could carry out shock attacks against vulnerable points of the enemy formation. The infantry meanwhile advanced behind, ready to make follow-on attacks, or providing a solid line of defense behind which the chariots could regroup if they ran into problems.

The operations of the Pharaoh Thutmose III gives evidence of Egyptian sophistication. At the Battle of Megiddo, in present-day Jordan, Syrian troops deployed in front of the city. Thutmose first sent the left wing of his force northwest of Megiddo, to cut off the Syrian line of retreat. He redeployed his right wing south of the city, and concentrated his powerful strike force of chariots, over 1,000 of them in the center. The chariots smashed the right flank of the Syrian formation and the Egyptian infantry, coming up fast, waded into the fray with javelin, sword and battle-axe. The Syrians army crumbled. Such successes were to continue as the improved Egyptian forces grew in power and influence throughout the region. The rise of Persia saw the conquest of the Egyptian state and the end of its independent military activity, however Egyptian forces, including the Nubian bowmen, still continued to make their mark as part of the Persian army, and even saw action against Alexander the Great at Issus, circa 333BC.

=== Empire of the Northwest: Carthage ===
The "mixed" Carthaginian military system. Situated in modern-day Tunisia, Carthage's empire drew heavily from the region, particularly Libyan infantry and Numidian cavalry. The Carthaginian military system was a "mixed" one – armies were made up of contingents drawn from various tribes and nations. Phoenicians, and a mixed population of Libyans and Phoenicians, called Liby-Phoenicians by the Greeks made up the privileged classes of the city. The most reliable troops were Libyan, primarily heavy infantry but with some light skirmishers and cavalry. The best light-cavalry was provided by the tribes of Numidia. To this were added other subject or allied contingents and mercenaries from Iberia, Sicily, Greece and Italy. If serving for extended periods under competent commanders such as Hamilcar, Hasdrubal and Hannibal, such "mixed" forces performed well. Coordination, command and control however tended to be less effective than in the more standardized Roman system. A similar "mixed" format can be observed in some eras of Egyptian military history with contingents from Libya, Syria, Nubia and other parts joining native Egyptians to fill out the ranks of Pharaoh's army.

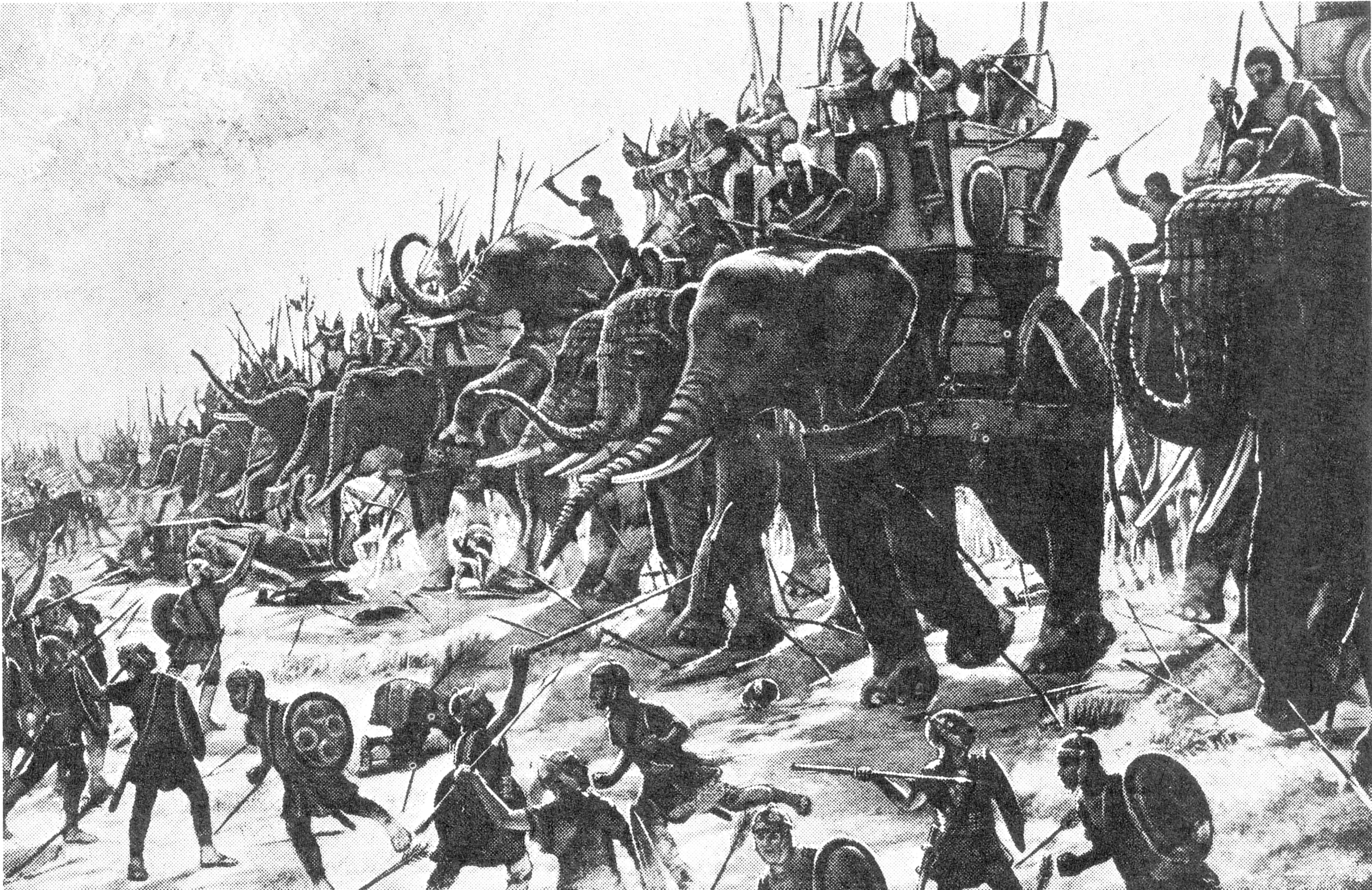
Rome's determination to defeat Carthage on its home ground saw invasions of Africa in both the First and Second Punic Wars. Carthage's "mixed" system drew contingents from many sources, including special troops of war elephants.

Early victories against Rome in Africa. In the First Punic War, the Roman general Marcus Atilius Regulus decided to bring the campaign directly to African soil, hoping to crush Carthage right in its own ground (256–255 BC). Regulus' invasion proceeded well in the initial stages, and soon the legions overran Tunis, using it as a base to mount raids against the city itself. Carthage rejected harsh peace terms by Regulus, and reformed its army, adding fresh contingents, including Greeks, native levies, and the veteran troops of Hamilcar's Sicilian campaign. Of note is the employment of the Spartan commander Xanthippus who tightened up organization, and instituted rigorous drill before the walls of the city. On the day of decision, about 100 war-elephants were also mobilized for action. The Carthaginian formation placed native levies in the center, and mercenary forces on the right. Cavalry was split between the wings. The elephants formed a shock force in the vanguard. In response, Regulus seemed to have deepened his formation, but he was heavily outnumbered by Carthaginian horse. Xanthippus ordered the war-elephants to charge, and they wreaked havoc on the legion front line. Roman cavalry was also routed, and the Carthaginian horsemen returned to attack the flanks and rear of the infantry. Almost the entire Roman force was destroyed in the battle, although some 2,000 men fought their way to safety. In this first major land victory against Rome by Carthage, sometimes referred to as the Battle of Tunis, the "mixed" approach of the North African city brought victory. A second encounter on African soil was not to go so favorably.

War in Africa – the Second Punic War at Zama. In the Second Punic War, Rome realized again that it had to strike at and defeat Carthage in its own homeland. Under Scipio Africanus, Roman forces did do it convincingly, with significant aid by the horsemen of Numidia under Masinissa. The patchwork of both African-based and other forces available to Hannibal at Zama was a far cry from what he had enjoyed in Italy. He lacked both the devastating Numidian cavalry arm and the hardcore Libyan infantry that aided him at Cannae. Most of the best horsemen were in the employ of Rome, under Masinissa, and what was left was outnumbered and relatively inexperienced. He was also forced to do battle with a relatively uncoordinated blend of Gallic and Spanish mercenary troops, local African levies, and the remaining battle-hardened veterans of the Italian campaign. Based on these weaknesses, Hannibal's deployment at Zama had much to recommend it, particularly in view of his lack of cavalry. His force was divided into three separate echelons- mercenaries in the first line, native levies in the second, and the old guard, the veterans of Italy (a mix of African, Gallic, Italic and Spanish fighting men) in the third. War-elephants would open the charge as in the first African land victory. Roman adjustments however neutralized the elephant charge, and the battle came down to a close-fought, bitter struggle between the veterans and the Roman infantry. The return of Numidian cavalry to crash into his rear doomed Hannibal's force. Rome would put an end to the Carthaginian military system and become the new power in northern Africa.

=== Sudanic fighting forces versus Persian, Roman and Islamic forces ===
Genesis of the Sudanic bowmen - Nubian archers- from Asiut, c. 2000 BC. Most bows were one-piece, between 6 and 7 feet in length, with draw strengths often requiring pull back with the feet. Arrows were sometimes poisoned.

Foreign invasions (Assyrians, Greeks, Romans and Arabs) were to bring an end to the great dynastic era of Egypt. However the prowess of the Sudanic infantry (variously known in writings as 'Kushites', 'Ethiopians', 'Nubians', 'Napthans' or 'Meroeites'), still made a distinctive mark in the region, and beyond, especially the archers. Several strong polities arose in the southern Nile Valley after the decline of the pharaonic period, ushering in the eras of Kush, Christian Nubia and other smaller groupings. Besides a process of internal conflict, fighting men from this region were to clash with several major external enemies - the legions of Rome, the armies of Persia, and the forces of Islam.

Bowmen were the most important force component. Ancient sources indicate that the Sudanic archers favored one-piece bows that were between six and seven feet long, with so powerful a draw strength that many of the archers used their feet to bend their bows. Although composite types saw some use, the Greek historian Herodotus (circa 450-420BC) indicates primary bow construction was of seasoned palm wood, with the arrows made of cane. Other sources describe intense encounters between African archers and a variety of enemies. Such fighting men were not an uncommon sight on battlefields or royal courts throughout the Mediterranean and Middle East. There is some indication that the arrows of Sudanic bowmen (including those fighting Rome) were often poison-tipped, a technique used elsewhere by Africa's archers, well into the 19th century. Among the Meriotic forces facing Rome, elephants were still occasionally used in war. Later Sudanic based forces like the Blemmye also deployed horses and camels for their raids over the Egyptian frontier, and the poisoned arrow tactics of their predecessors found ready employment.

==== Sudanic forces versus Persian armies ====
The Persian Cambyses II invasion of Egypt (circa 525 BC) yielded a decisive victory at the battle of Pelusium, routing Egyptian forces, capturing Memphis and taking the Egyptian ruler Psammetichus captive. These rapid Persian successes however stalled when Cambyses moved further south to attack the Kingdom of Kush. Logistical difficulties in crossing desert terrain were compounded by the fierce response of the Kushite armies, particularly accurate volleys of archery that not only decimated Persian ranks, but sometimes targeted the faces and eyes of individual Persian warriors. One historical source notes:

"So from the battlements as though on the walls of a citadel, the archers kept up with a continual discharge of well aimed shafts, so dense that the Persians had the sensation of a cloud descending upon them, especially when the Ethiopians made their enemies; eyes the targets.. SO unerring was their aim that those who they pierced with their shafts rushed about wildly in the throngs with the arrows projecting from their eyes like double flutes."

One Kushite ruler is recorded as taunting Persian spies with the gift of a bow, inviting the Persian armies to return when they found strength enough to draw the weapon. Stymied by the Kushites, the Persians were forced to withdraw in failure.

==== Nubian/Kushite forces versus Roman legions ====
The Roman conquest of Egypt put it on a collision course with the Sudanic powers of the southern regions. In 20 BC, Kushites under their ruler Teriteqas, invaded Egypt with some 30,000 troops. Kushite forces were mostly infantry and their armament consisted of bows about 4 cubits long, shields of rawhide, and clubs, hatchets, pikes and swords. The Kushites penetrated as far south as the Aswan area, defeating three Roman cohorts, conquering Syene, Elephantine and Philae, capturing thousands of Egyptians, and overthrowing bronze statutes of Augustus recently erected there. The head of one of these Augustian statutes was carried off to Meroe as a trophy, and buried under a temple threshold of the Candace Amanirenas, to commemorate the Kushite victory, and symbolically tread on her enemies. A year later, Rome dispatched troops under Publius Petronius to confront the Kushites, with the Romans repulsing a poorly armed Meroitic force at Pselchis. Strabo reports that Petronius continued to advance- taking Premnis and then the Kushite city of Napata. Petronius deemed the roadless country beyond unsuitable or too difficult for further operations. He pulled back to Premnis, strengthening its fortifications, and leaving a garrison in place. These setbacks did not settle hostilities however for a Kushite resurgence occurred just three years later under the queen or Candace Amanirenas, with strong reinforcements of African troops from further south. Kushite pressure now once more advanced on Premnis. The Romans countered this initiative by sending more troops to reinforce the city. A decisive final campaign did not take place however but negotiations instead- with final outcomes that saw major concessions being granted to an enemy of Rome.

The Meroitic diplomats were invited to confer with the Roman emperor Augustus himself on the Greek island of Samos where he was headquartered temporarily. That the Kushites did not appear as beaten supplicants is suggested by the aggressive message brought to the Romans by the envoys of Meroe. A bundle of golden arrows was presented with the envoys reputedly saying: "The Kandake sends you these arrows. If you want peace, they are a token of her friendship and warmth. If you want war, you are going to need them." An entente between the two parties was beneficial to both. The Kushites were a regional power in their own right and resented paying tribute. The Romans sought a quiet southern border for their absolutely essential Egyptian grain supplies, without constant war commitments, and welcomed a friendly buffer state in a border region beset with raiding nomads. The Kushites too appear to have found nomads like the Blemmyes to be a problem, allowed Rome monitoring and staging outposts against them, and even conducted joint military operations with the Romans in later years against such mauraders. The conditions were ripe for a deal. During negotiations, Augustus granted the Kushite envoys all they asked for, and also cancelled the tribute earlier demanded by Rome. Premmis (Qasr Ibrim), and areas north of Qasr Ibrim in the southern portion of the "Thirty-Mile Strip"] were ceded to the Kushites, the Dodekaschoinos was established as a buffer zone, and Roman forces were pulled back to the old Greek Ptolemaic border at Maharraqa. Roman emperor Augustus signed the treaty with the Kushites on Samos. The settlement bought Rome peace and quiet on its Egyptian frontier, and increased the prestige of Roman Emperor Augustus, demonstrating his skill and ability to broker peace without constant warfare, and do business with the distant Kushites, who a short time earlier had been fighting his troops. The respect accorded the emperor by the Kushite envoys as the treaty was signed also created a favorable impression with other foreign ambassadors present on Samos, including envoys from India, and strengthened Augustus' hand in upcoming negotiations with the powerful Parthians. The settlement ushered in a period of peace between the two empires for around three centuries. Inscriptions erected by Queen Amanirenas on an ancient temple at Hamadab, south of Meroe, record the war and the favorable outcome from the Kushite perspective. Along with his signature on the official treaty, Roman emperor Augustus marked the agreement by directing his administrators to collaborate with regional priests in the erection of a temple at Dendur, and inscriptions depict the emperor himself celebrating local deities.

==== Nubian/Kushite forces versus Arab forces ====
The third major opponent to confront the fighting men of Nubia was the Arabs, who had overrun Egypt and large parts of the Mideast. For almost 600 years, the powerful bowmen of the region created a barrier for Muslim expansion into the northeast of the African continent, fighting off multiple invasions and assaults with stinging swarms of arrows. One modern historian (Ayalon 2000) likens Nubian resistance to that of a dam, holding back the Muslim tide for several centuries. According to Ayalon:

The absolutely unambiguous evidence and unanimous agreement of the early Muslim sources is that the Arabs abrupt stop was caused solely and exclusively by the superb military resistance of the Christian Nubians. .. the Nubian Dam. The array of those early sources includes the two most important chronicles of early Islam, al-Tabari (d. 926) and al-Yaqubi (d. 905); the two best extant books on the Muslim conquests, al-Baladhuri (d. 892) and Ibn al-A tham al-Kufi (d. 926); the most central encyclopedic work of al-Masudi (d.956); and the two best early sources dedicated specifically to Egypt, Ibn Abd al-Hakim (d. 871) and al-Kindi (961).. All of the above-cited sources attribute Nubian success to their superb archery.. To this central factor should be added the combination of the Nubians' military prowess and Christian zeal; their acquaintance of the terrain; the narrowness of the front line that they had to defend; and, quite possibly, the series of cataracts situated at their back, and other natural obstacles.. The Nubians fought the Muslims very fiercely. When they encountered them they showered them with arrows, until all of them were wounded and they withdrew with many wounds and gouged eyes. Therefore they were called "the marksmen of the eye."

Yet another notes:

The awe and respect that the Muslims had for their Nubian adversaries are reflected in the fact that even a rather late Umayyad caliph, Umar b Abd al- Aziz (Umar II 717-720), is said to have ratified the Nubian-Muslim treaty out of fear for the safety of the Muslims (he ratified the peace treaty out of consideration for the Muslims and out of [a desire] to spare their lives..

The Nubians constituted an "African front" that barred Islam's spread, along with others in Central Asia, India and the Anatolian/Mediterranean zone. Whereas the Islamic military expansion began with swift conquests across Byzantium, Central Asia, the Maghrib and Spain, such quick triumphs foundered at the Sudanic barrier. Internal divisions, along with infiltration by nomads were to weaken the "Nubian dam" however and eventually it gave way to Muslim expansion from Egypt and elsewhere in the region.

== Horses, guns and military transformation ==
The pre-gunpowder era spans the centuries from the start of medieval times to the beginnings of Arab and European expansion in the 16th and 17th centuries. Warfare ranged from minor raiding to major campaigns, and saw the full set of missile, cutting and thrusting weapons used elsewhere in warfare. Added to these were archery weapons- like the bows and poisoned arrows of the Ndongo, Fulani or Mossi. Defensive positions ran the gamut- from imposing castles, to field fortifications with trenches and ramparts. Changes in methods and organization accompanied innovations in weaponry. Both infantry and cavalry forces were well represented on the African continent in the pre-colonial era, and the introduction of both horses and guns in large numbers was to have important implications for military systems.

=== The coming of the horse ===
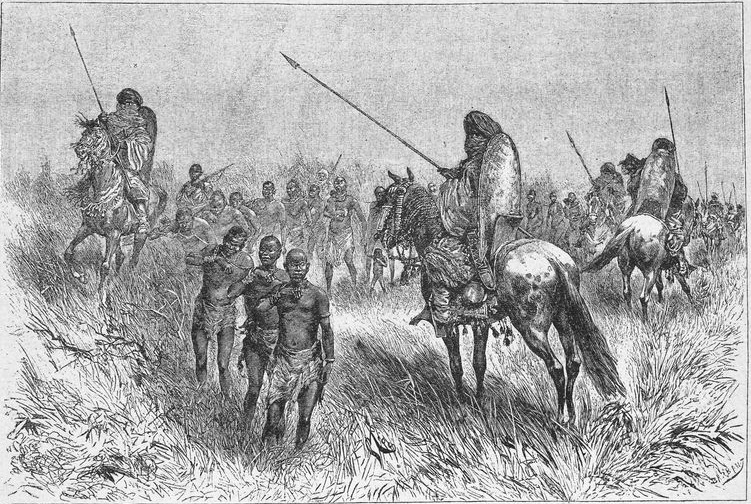
Despite their tactical advantages, horses were often expensive to acquire and maintain, and suffered from the disease carrying tsetse fly.

Importance of the horse. Archers of West Africa are mentioned by Strabo, circa 1 AD, and appear frequently in Arab accounts of the region in later centuries. The primacy of such warriors, together with those who wielded the spear, was challenged by the coming of horses, increasingly introduced around the 14th century to the flat country of the Sahel and Saharan regions, and the savannas of northern West Africa. Lances, stirrups and saddles were to accompany horses, giving the mounted warrior a significant advantage over the lumbering footman. Several cavalry-dominated polities were to emerge in the savannah regions, including Mali, Songhai, Oyo, Bornu and others. Horse imports surpassed local breeding in several areas, and were to remain important through the centuries. Accounts of the empire of Mali mention saddles and stirrups. These made new tactics possible, such as mass charges with thrusting spear and swords. Armor also developed, to protect both the cavalryman and his mount, including iron helmets and chain mail. Some British historians speculate that one of the personages responsible for such innovations on a wide scale was the famous Mansa Musa, emperor of Mali, who is documented as taking several steps to incorporate Mali more fully into Islamic civilization. During his pilgrimage to Mecca in 1324, the Sultan of Egypt specifically presented him with numerous horses, all equipped with saddles and bridles. The rise of cavalry did not totally displace the archers and spearmen of West Africa. The two arms sometimes worked side by side.

Limitations of the horse. There were serious limitations to the spread of the horse in warfare however, as opposed to their use for ceremonial purposes. Horse breeding and maintenance was difficult and restricted in many parts of West and Central Africa due to the tsetse fly induced sleeping sickness disease that struck both man and beast; heavy imports were a practical necessity, especially the larger breeds. States like Dagoma in northern Ghana, Nupe and the Yoruba kingdom of Oyo in Nigeria were very dependent on imports of horses, usually financed by the sale of slaves. As in medieval Europe, maintaining cavalry forces was also more expensive, requiring armor, saddlery, stables, trappings, and extra remounts. Disruption of imports on trade routes could reduce the horse supply. The absence of relatively flat terrain also made cavalry more difficult to deploy. The Oyo for example, had relatively little success in thick forested areas during an ineffective invasion of Nigeria in the 17th century. Horses also had to be fed and maintained, a pressing logistical burden for large formations. Indeed, fighting horses in West African states were often kept in stables and fed there, rather than being put out to graze in the open where the tsetse fly might whittle down their numbers. In Oyo, large numbers of slaves were kept to maintain horses, hauling fodder and water to the stables, and accompanying the cavalry forces as support troops. Their introduction thus had a varying impact in many areas.

=== The coming of the gun ===
In Africa, the Adal Empire and the Abyssinian Empire both deployed gunpowder weapons during the Adal-Abyssinian War. Imported from Arabia, and the wider Islamic world, the Adalites, led by Ahmed ibn Ibrahim al-Ghazi, were the first African power to introduce cannon warfare to the African continent. Later on as the Portuguese Empire entered the war it would supply and train the Abyssinians with cannon and muskets, while the Ottoman Empire sent soldiers and cannon to back Adal. The conflict proved, through their use on both sides, the value of firearms such as the matchlock musket, cannon, and the arquebus over traditional weapons.

Ernest Gellner in his book 'Nations and Nationalism' argues that the centralizing potential of the gun and the book, enabled both the Somali people and the Amhara people to dominate the political history of a vast area in Africa, despite neither of them being numerically predominant.

"In the Horn of Africa both the Amharas and the Somalis possessed both gun and Book (not the same Book, but rival and different editions), and neither bothered greatly with the wheel. Each of these ethnic groups was aided in its use of these two pieces of cultural equipment by its link to other members of the wider religious civilization which habitually used them, and were willing to replenish their stock." – Ernest Gellner

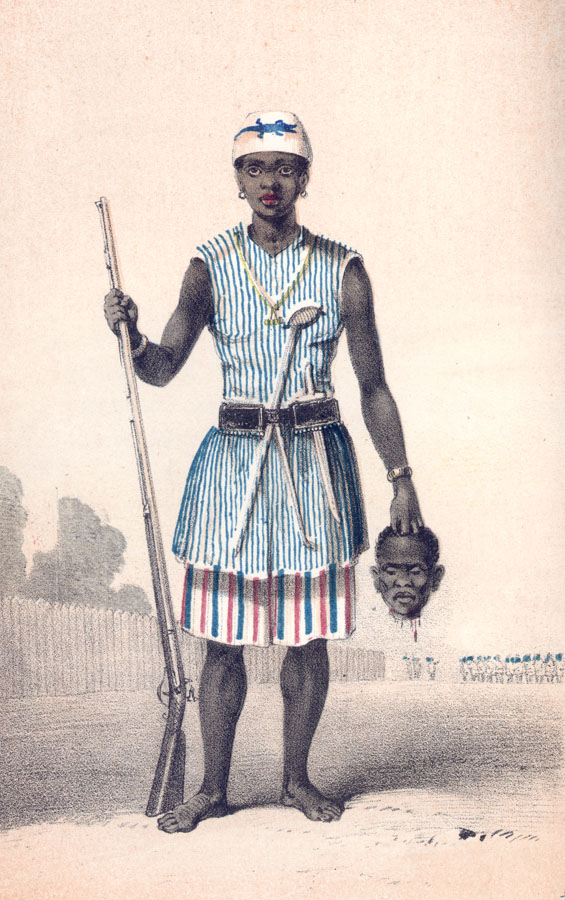
Many military systems blended guns with traditional warfare styles. Unusual formations included corps of female warriors- the Amazons of Dahomey.

Importance of guns. Guns were to have an important effect on African military systems. Rising quantities of guns are associated with increases in the slave trade, as major powers such as Dahomey, Benin and Ashanti stepped up their conquests to feed the insatiable demand for human bodies. Guns were an important item traded to Africans in the decades prior to 1800, usually paid for in gold or slaves. Some historians argue that the introduction of firearms had an enormous impact on slave gathering in Africa. Flintlocks, which were more reliable than matchlocks, sparked the first big wave of gun sales, and obsolete smoothbore muskets of this type were being exported to Africa even into the 19th century. The psychological impact of guns in the night and dawn attacks favored by slave raiders was significant, and in slave-catching, flintlocks could also be loaded with shot, wounding and crippling victims rather than killing them outright. The connection between the gun trade and the slave trade is described by the Dutch Director-General at Elmina in 1730:

"The great quantity of guns and powder which the Europeans have brought have caused terrible wars between the Kings and Princes and Caboceers of these lands, who made their prisoners of war slaves; these slaves were immediately bought up by Europeans at steadily increasing prices, which in turn, animates again and again these people to renew their facilities, and their hope of gain and easy profits makes them forget all about, using all sorts of pretexts to attack each other for reviving old disputes."

The Dutch themselves were exporting over 20,000 tons of gunpowder every year along the Gold Coast by 1700. All along the region, English, French and other traders competed hard with each other to supply their African customers. By the mid-18th century some 400,000 guns were being exported annually to Africa. Such sales helped stoke conflict and the generation of captives for slavery, but some historians caution against seeing all wars on the continent in the modern era as primarily slave-collecting activity instigated by firearms, noting that African kingdoms and states had long-standing rivalries and conflicts even before the introduction of gunpowder weapons, or the appearance of Europeans. The Portuguese in Angola also sold and distributed firearms as they sought to stoke wars among various African groups and peoples, so as to generate captives for slavery. Part of this policy was to play one African group, or internal faction within a group off against another, and the direct hire of mercenaries such as the Imbangala to raid and seize captives for transport aboard Portuguese ships to the Americas. Hired African mercenaries were also essential in colonial expansion. In the 1600s for example the Portuguese hired Imbangala mercenaries to wage war with them against the Ndongo kingdom. This campaign and some others in the region not only aided colonial conquests, but profitably generated thousands of prisoners for slave transport.

Multiple users of guns. Firearms were not the sole monopoly of organized states against other states or kingdoms or small outlier peoples, but were also used by a plethora of predatory private bandits, raiders, kidnappers and warlords seeking captives to feed the heavy European, and Arab/North African demand for slaves. These entities, sometimes directly supplied with firearms by European or Arab/North African slave dealers, ranged widely in the regions where they operated, creating massive turmoil and insecurity, particularly where strong centralized states that could protect their subjects did not exist, or were weak. The incoming flow of firearms and the widespread disruption brought by the slave trade in Angola and elsewhere in West and Central Africa caused some African states and communities to adopt slave raiding both as a state-building and as a self-defense measure- acquiring captives to sell to acquire gunpowder weapons. Various peoples and states also created new professionalized castes of slave warriors, led by slave commanders, (the ceddo armies) armed with both gunpowder or traditional weapons to make war not only for defense but to attack others and seize slaves, intensifying the cycle of predatory dislocation and violence across many areas. The Muslim jihads that swept parts of West Africa in the 18th and 19th centuries used religion as a motivator, but nevertheless also generated tens of thousands of Africans for the Atlantic slave ships or slave caravans over the Saharan desert. Fula jihadists and religious leaders in Upper Guinea for example sought European firearms not only for their wars against internal opponents, but also for slave raiding. As more and more captives were seized, these were further traded for desired European goods, and even more guns. All of these entities: whether royal hegemon, religious leader, private trader or private mercenary/warlord, made use of firearms in their operations, a pattern continuing into the 19th century.

Limitations of guns. When deployed in sufficient numbers to offset their disadvantages, firearms were to have a substantial impact, this impact was not uniformly revolutionary or even transformational in all areas. Guns did not quickly displace native arms and organization across the board. Responses were mixed- from outright rejection, to a mix of spear and musket side by side on the battlefield. The guns introduced into Africa were often lower quality, inaccurate, slow-firing varieties. Indeed, it was standard practice by European merchants and government officials to ship defective firearms to West Africa. In 1719 for example, it was estimated that only 4 out of every 50 trade guns were serviceable at Cape Coast Castle, and in 1736, one Danish official on the West Coast complained to his masters in Copenhagen about the large number of carbines that burst on being fired, hurting his credibility with local chiefs and traders. On the Slave Coast, 18th century records show the King of Dahomey making complaints to European traders about guns that burst when fired. Little change in official policy occurred however, and trading monopolies and colonial regimes made strenuous attempt to regulate or keep out independent "rogue" traders. Competition between the Dutch, English, French and other powers was also fierce, sometimes leading to better arms, but sometimes causing cuts in quality to maintain slim profit margins. In short, firearms were by no means a guarantee of success in warfare in Africa, until the late 19th century's rifles, rockets, artillery and Maxim/Gatling guns.

==== Spearman and bowman versus gunman ====
The history of the Angolan region offers instructive detail on the advantages and limitations of firearms, as well as a comparison of African versus European systems. Portuguese troops often turned in excellent performances, but written sources sometimes exaggerate the number of native enemies defeated, giving a misleading picture of the military situation. One source for example claims opposing armies of over one million African enemy troops, a highly dubious figure according to some modern historians. It is clear that firearms conferred an undoubted tactical advantage both in African and European battlefields, but such success was influenced by other factors such as terrain, weather, morale and the enemy response. The record is mixed. Using time, organization and superior numbers, indigenous forces sometimes neutralized or defeated troops with firearms. In the Zambezi basin in 1572 for example, a 600-man force of Portuguese arquebusiers, supplemented with cannon, formed a disciplined square, and defeated several thousand Africans armed with bows, spears and axes. Portuguese gains from the encounter however amounted to little less than 50 cows when the smoke cleared, and their mission to control the gold mines of Mwene Mutapa failed. Indeed, they were forced to pay tribute to the native Mutapa state in return for the right to limited mining.

When the whole record is analyzed, gun-armed European troops met defeat on several occasion by charging spearmen or African infantry using poisoned arrows. In 1684 for example, the spearmen and bowmen of Changamire Dombo met the Portuguese in open combat at Mahungwe. Firearms inflicted heavy casualties on the African force, but the prolonged battle stretched into the darkness and night attacks forced a Portuguese retreat, after which their camp was looted. Portuguese writers of the period comment favorably on the tight discipline of the African armies, additional weapons such as battle axes, the crescent formation used as they deployed for battle, and deception tactics during night attacks that included erecting a massive number of campfires around the Portuguese position, fooling defenders into thinking Dombo's force was twice as large. In the 1690s Dombo's forces followed up this victory with a clean sweep of the Portuguese, in a campaign that expelled them from all their settlements on the Zimbabwe plateau. This triumph effectively terminated the future presence of the Portuguese in the area, cutting them off from the gold mines. Overall, Portugal's foothold in the region was to remain tenuous for at least two centuries. These and other incidents illustrate both the power and limitations of firearms in African military systems. The later observations of Zulu King Chaka on the efficacy of firearms versus African alternatives were thus not unreasonable. However, several of the Angolan kingdoms integrated a mix of gunmen with their indigenous fighting forces, adding to the diversity of arrangements for combat. This integration of new technology with existing systems is similar to the pike-musket-crossbow combinations seen when firearms were introduced to European battlefields.

== The cavalry empires of the savannah ==
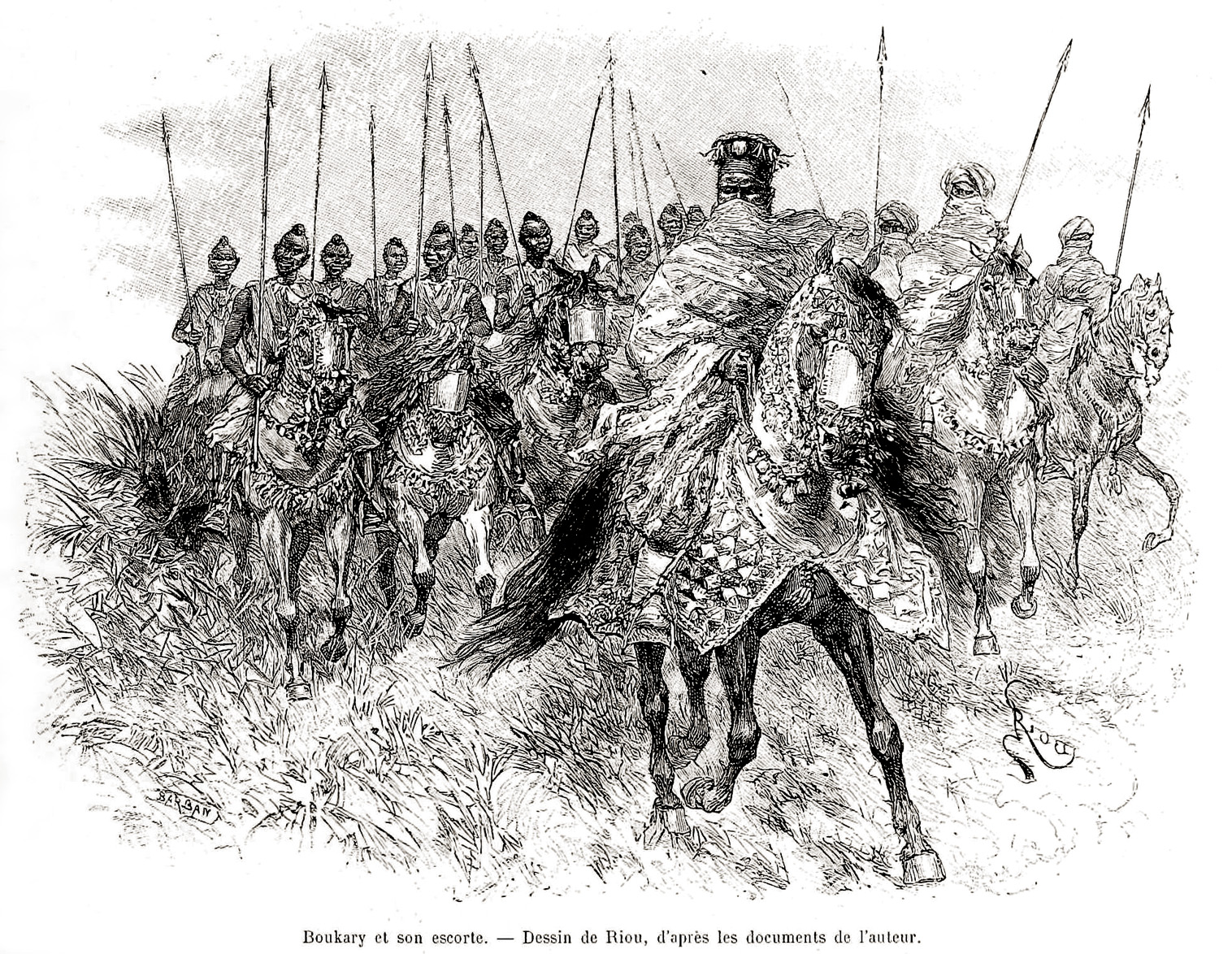
Relying heavily on cavalry but incorporating infantry as well, the savannah empires dominated large parts of West Africa for centuries.

Contrary to popular Western impressions, sub-Saharan Africa did produce significant cavalry forces where the environment permitted it. The savannahs of Western Africa in particular (Guinea, Gambia, Senegal, Niger etc.) and its borderlands into the Sahara and Sahel saw the development of several powerful cavalry-based states that dominated the region for centuries. Where the tsetse fly was not strong, and the terrain was favorable, the mounted horseman came into his own, and emerged as the true aristocracy of the savannah. As they did further north in Carthage, Egypt and Libya, the introduction of the horse, (and to some extent the camel in desert areas) had a transformational effect on African warfare.

=== Arms, equipment and weaponry ===
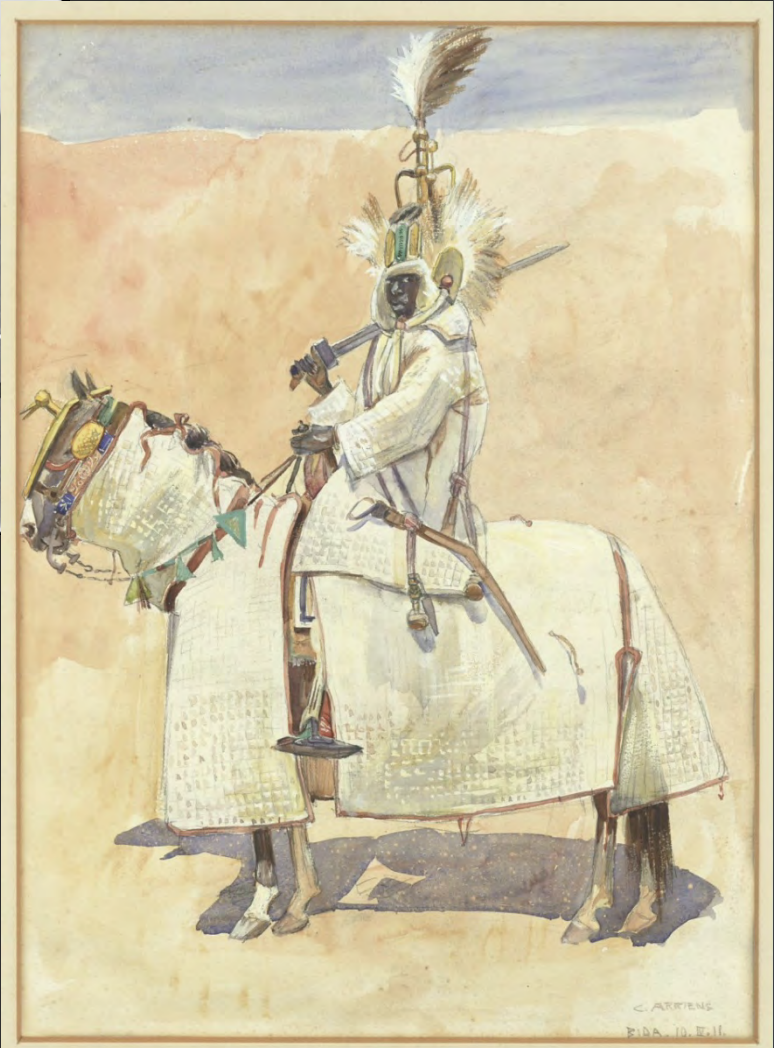
Nupe cavalryman of Bida, in the Sokoto Caliphate, wearing lifidi (padded armour)

Cavalry weapons and armor. Among the Fulani-Hausa armies of Sokoto, both horse and rider were shielded. The horse was generally covered by quilted cotton, stuffed with kapok fiber, and its rider generally rode into battle with finely wrought chain mail, or heavy quilted armor. The chain mail armor showed similarities to Mameluke design, but the quilting combined local invention with religious inspiration. Local armorers sew tightly rolled wads of paper inscribed with Quranic verses into the layers of cotton, and kapok. Whatever their spiritual powers, they could often blunt sword cuts, but were less effective against arrows. Body armor was supplemented by reinforced leather helmets, and tough shields of elephant or hippo hide. Horse stirrups often made effective weapons in a close fought melee, disemboweling enemy mounts and wounding enemy infantry.

The hand weapons of the Sudanic cavalry were the sword, lance, battle-axe and broad-bladed spear. Throwing javelins, a weapon used by the Numidian horsemen of Hannibal in antiquity, also saw service, particularly in the Senegal and Niger valleys. Quivers holding 10–20 of these weapons were used with such speed and skill that at least one 17th-century account compares them favorably to firearms. Among the Mossi, horseman wore as many clothes as possible to protect against enemy arrows. Four or five tunics, reinforced by leather and various magical or religious charms made up his armor. Horses were protected with large pieces of leather, with a large front piece of copper for the horse's head. Traditional village groups- commoners – were perennial prey for the Mossi, and they often defended themselves by strengthening village fortifications. Blacksmiths made arrows, spears and other weapons from iron mined and smelted in Mossi country. The Mossi sometimes tipped their cavalry lances with the same poison used by archers.

=== Leadership, organization and tactics ===
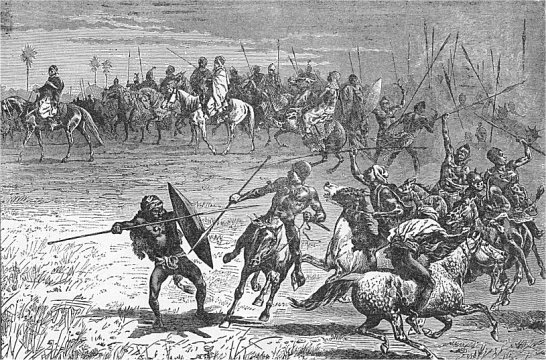

On suitable terrain, the fast-moving horseman was the dominant force. When infantry operated on ground less favorable to cavalry however, and deployed firearms or disciplined archery, the mounted man was not as effective. Cavalry tactics were varied based on the mix of mounted and foot troops on hand for an operation. Infantry forces were usually larger, and the typical order of battle was a mass of infantry levies armed with hide shields, arrows, bows and spears, and a higher status mounted formation. Cavalry relied heavily on missile action, usually casting javelins in one or two passes, before closing in with lances for shock action. The infantry provided a steadying force if they could mass compactly enough to stand against cavalry charges. Raiding type tactics were standard, particularly in acquiring captives for sale. Generally the savanna cavalries used a combined arms approach, seldom operating without supporting infantry.

Military operations of the savannah empires can be illustrated by the Mossi. Men of noble birth dominated the mounted units, and commoners were relegated to auxiliary foot formations. The main striking power of the Mossi forces rested in the cavalry, with the typical unit made up of 10 to 15 horsemen. The Mossi emperor delegated supreme command on expeditions to a field commander, or tansoba.

Raiding was the most common form of Mossi combat. Informants or scouts would locate a settlement or caravan. The raiding force took advantage of terrain, screening their approach, and utilizing knowledge of supply points like watering holes. March order was typically single file, until the target was spotted. The Mossi horsemen then charged, usually encircling the target, seizing slaves and cattle, and making a quick retreat. In bigger expeditions, a more formal battle order was taken. Infantry skirmishers, who were usually considered more expendable, formed a vanguard to engage the enemy. The cavalry next charged, organized into three units, right, center and left. If the initial infantry attack was unsuccessful, the cavalry might retreat, leaving the infantry to its own fate, or helping them if so ordered by the force commander.

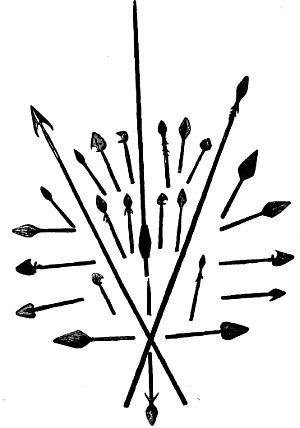
Poisoned wooden arrows from Central Africa- about 24 inches long. Hardened by fire, the needle-sharp heads were smeared with poison, and carefully wrapped in leaves. Discharged from 3-foot bows, these frail-looking but dangerous weapons could be lethal at short ranges.

Other savannah forces had more detailed organization. The Zaberma Army of the Upper Volta for example was also relied primarily on cavalry. They forced prisoners – blacksmiths, leatherworkers and miners to make weapons. About 20% of the army was needed to supervise this forced labor. Quartermasters and paymasters accompanied each expedition and tried to keep an accounting of the booty captured- gold, cattle, slaves and other treasure. After the king had received the bulk of the booty, the quartermasters redistributed the rest to the fighting units. Some forces retained religious specialists, the ulamas to exhort the troops, arbitrate disputes, and regulate punishments.

The Mali Empire deployed both footmen and cavalry, under two general commands- the North and the South armies. Supreme command for all forces rested with the ruler, but the northern and southern army groupings were under two assigned generals. Cavalry was the elite arm of the force and provided the stable nucleus of an army that when fully mobilized numbered some 100,000 effectives, spread throughout the empire, between the northern and southern wings. Ninety percent of these were infantry. A cavalry force- the farai supervised the infantry, under officers called kele-koun. The footmen could be both slaves or freemen, and were dominated by archers. Three archers to one spearman was the general ratio of Malian formations in the 16th century. The archers generally opened a battle, softening up the enemy for cavalry charges or the advance of the spearmen. Sword and lance were the weapons of choice in the cavalry forces, sometimes tipped with poison. A large flotilla of canoes supported army movements on campaigns. The Songhay, successors of Mali, also illustrate the general pattern, and the importance of infantry combining with cavalry. In their clash with Moroccans at Tondibi, the Songhay massed footmen in the center and horsemen on the wings. A cavalry charge by horsemen on both sides provoked a melee, and the decision came down to the opposing sides of infantry.

Guns and the cavalry. The introduction of guns saw a rise in the quantities and role of infantry within the savannah empires. Firepower gave the gun-armed footman growing influence, not only as far as bullets delivered, but the fact that the noise and smoke of muskets could frighten horses in the enemy camp, creating a tactical advantage; this happened when Asante gunmen confronted the horsemen of Gonja in the 17th century. The success of the gun-armed Moroccans in the 16th century also illustrates the growing impact of firearms. As gun quality and volume increased, the cavalry became more at risk, and eventually even some horsemen began to acquire firearms. The gunpowder era thus saw mixed forces in action throughout the savannah empires. If infantry were operating with mounted formations, the musketeers were generally used to open a battle, and soften up opposing defences for thundering cavalry charges. Traditional weapons still remained strong in many areas however, both in terms of archers and bowmen, and cavalry. Early musket-man formations relied on relatively slow-loading, inaccurate weapons, and could be defeated by fast-moving horsemen. This happened in 1767 when Tuareg cavalry defeated an army of Timbuktu that deployed Moroccan musketeers. The old weapons thus remained relevant for some time after the coming of guns, on into the 19th century.

== The infantry kingdoms ==
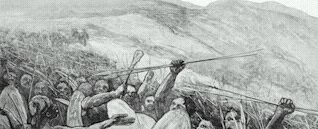
Traditional organization relied on as needed call-up of troops rather than standing armies.

The civilizations of Western and Central tropical Africa suffered comparative isolation in comparison to areas open to the wider trade of the Sahara and Mediterranean. Nevertheless, several strong kingdoms and peoples like the Yoruba, Nupe, Wolof, Hausa, and Ndongo emerged that were to demonstrate continued evolution in African warfare. The coming of the gunpowder era was to bring even more change to this zone, and infantry powers like the Asante, Benin, Dahomey, Oyo, the Igbo states of Nigeria and the Kongo states of Angola gained new prominence, or strengthened their local power.

=== Arms, equipment and weaponry ===
Traditional weapons – spear, bow and war-club The traditional arms and equipment of the tropical kingdoms of West, Central and South-Central Africa consisted of the standard cutting, thrusting and smashing weapons. Spears were less strong than those evolved later in southern Africa under the Zulu, and doubled as throwing and thrusting implements. The bow and arrow found wide use, with relatively weak bow strength being offset by the use of poisoned arrows in many areas. Use of bowmen to defend fortifications was significant, and peoples like the Yoruba sometimes used crossbows for this purpose. Bow strength is reported by many observers as averaging only approximately 40 pounds at full draw, although simple one-piece bows with some of the largest draw-weights in the world are reported from Kenya – 130 lbs compared to 80 lbs for a typical medieval European longbow. The use of poisoned arrows from the West African plant, Strophantus hispidus and other sources however, helped rectify the shortcoming in the weaker African bows, and bowmen were skilled at delivering a large volume of shafts. Among tribes such as the Marka poisoned arrows were about 1 ft long, tipped with iron and poison, and unfeathered. Archers generally carried quivers filled with 40–50 arrows each. Volume could be heavy, with some men firing two arrows at a time. Volume made up for the lack of accuracy with the unfeathered arrows. Resupply arrangements were not well articulated and an archer exhausting his quiver generally withdrew from the field. Although cavalry was known, it was minor among African forces of the Guinea- Gambia regions who used both the maritime and the infantry tradition, conducting raids on land and water. Archery was important and fighting men of some Sierra Leone tribes carried so many poisoned arrows that they needed two quivers. These archers repulsed attempts by privateer John Hawkins in 1568, who tried to launch raids on the African coasts, as well as Portuguese sea intruders before Hawkins. A heavy throwing club was also used in some areas, with sufficient power to break bones on contact. Some of these clubs had sharp animal and fish teeth embedded. Such was their speed and accuracy that African fighters in the 1650s wiped out an attacking Portuguese force with them.

Guns. As in Europe, firearms were integrated gradually into local armies, working in tandem with the spear, bow and war-club. They sometimes compared unfavorably with traditional weapons such as poisoned arrows, or the quick charges of motivated cavalry and spearmen. As noted above, the Portuguese were unsuccessful in the Zambezi region for decades because in the right circumstances, hard-driving spearmen could overwhelm musketeers. Deployment of guns was not as organized as that in Europe, where squares of gunmen drilled to deliver massed fire. A loose skirmishing formation was more common, just as it was with the bow. Guns were valued not only for their bullets but the psychological effect of their noise and smoke. They also figured prominently in the armament of small groups of royal or elite troops. One exception to this pattern appears to be Dahomey, where arquebusiers were drilled in a standardized fashion, and delivered volleys of fire with a counter-marching maneuver. Over time, most native kingdoms gradually began to use more guns, and these were eventually to change the landscape considerably. Formerly dominant kingdoms like Benin found their hegemony weakened, as new powers arose. The smaller riverine states of the Niger Delta for example began to arm their massive war-canoes with guns and cannon obtained from European sources, and began to carve out new commercial empires that nibbled away the power of the older states. This process was to accelerate in the 19th century.

=== Organization and tactics ===
Fighting units and mobilization. In the heavily forested regions of West, Central and South-Central Africa, the foot soldier held sway. Most states did not maintain standing armies, but mobilized fighting men as needed. Rulers often built up a royal or palace guard as an elite force, sometimes using slaves. These formed a permanent, professional nucleus around which the general purpose levies were mustered. The heavy, shield-bearing infantry of the Angolan region (West Central Africa) are an illustration of these more professionalized forces. The general-purpose levies were drawn upon in a more localized manner and were expected to furnish their own weapons and rations when mustered for combat. They were generally mobilized when war was imminent and demobilized when the crisis was over. While they did not see as much service as male troops in the field, the most unusual example of an elite force is in Dahomey, where a special corps of female warriors guarded the person of the monarch. These 'Amazons' also carried out various functions of state such as auditing the accounts of sub-chiefs to determine if they were giving the king his proper share of taxes collected. Logistics was not highly organized. Porters and canoes were pressed into service on the campaign trail, but most armies ultimately lived off the land. Success often hinged on the ability of the defenders or attackers to sustain themselves in the field.

Formations and deployment for battle. Most states had a definite battle order for deployment of troops. As historian Robert July notes: the Fulani grouped their forces so that formations of picked spearmen went into action first. Behind the spearmen came the archers, and further back, a melee of general purpose forces that charged into combat. In the 17th century, Gold Coast peoples like the Fante grouped their troops into compact columns, easy to maneuver on the march and remaining somewhat together when spread out for combat. Like the Fulani, the Fante also sent spearmen first into battle, while the archers fired over their heads. A general charge by warriors further back- under their Braffos or commanders, then ensued, with sword, club and battle-axe brought to bear on the opposing side. In either of these configurations war leaders seem to have had little consistent means of controlling troop movement once the fray was joined. By contrast, the forces of some other tropical states were better organized. In the Kongo region (present day Angola), troops were divided into companies and regiments, each with their own unique insignia. Designated field commanders controlled troop movement with signals from drums, bells and elephant tusk horns. Unlike the Fante or Fulani, archers usually opened a battle with only a very limited volley of arrows. The decisive echelon was the main force of spearmen. Deployment was staggered, so that initial fighting waves fell back on command when tired, and fresh contingents moved up from the rear to take their place.

Formations were comparatively loose in the Congo region, and various groups were tasked with movements determined on the spot by their leaders. Firearms did not change this basic pattern. While movement was not as tightly controlled or executed as among the Zulu, war-leaders were quite aware of the basic stratagems of maneuver, including extension of a battle-line to attempt encirclement. In the Guinea/Gambia Zone however fighting formations were tighter, an expedient also adopted by European infantry who faced mounted knights. According to sailors of the repulsed Hawkins expedition in the 16th century, armies deployed with shield-bearers in front, each with a two-headed javelin for fighting. Behind each shield-bearer, stood 3 archers, ready to provide firepower support. The battle usually opened with a discharge of arrows. A war cry was then given, and general hand-to-hand fighting ensued. Tighter formations required planned drill in advance. A commander named Xerebogo for example in the 16th century kept his soldiers in step by using bells attached to pace horses. The advent of guns loosened this tight organization, and more maneuver and open formations were employed.

=== Fortifications ===
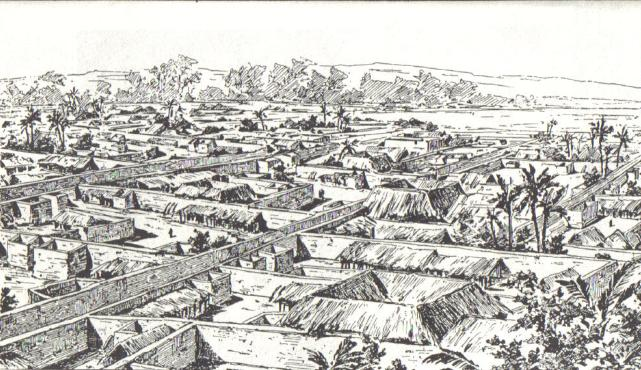
Detail of Benin City c. 1897 showing some fortified walls.

Defensive works were of importance in the tropical militaries above. In the Kongo region they often represented a type of field fortification, with trenches and low earthen embankments. Such strongpoints ironically, sometimes held up much better against European cannon than taller, more imposing structures. In 15th century Benin, the works were more impressive. The walls of the city-state are described as the world's second longest man-made structure, and the series of earthen ramparts as the most extensive earthwork in the world, in the Guinness Book of Records, 1974. Strong citadels were also built in other areas of Africa. Yorubaland for example had several sites surrounded by the full range of earthworks and ramparts seen elsewhere, and sited on ground that improved defensive potential- such as hills and ridges. Yoruba fortifications were often protected with a double wall of trenches and ramparts, and in the Congo forests concealed ditches and paths, along with the main works, often bristled with rows of sharpened stakes. Inner defenses were laid out to blunt an enemy penetration with a maze of defensive walls allowing for entrapment and crossfire on opposing forces.

== Three examples of systems or events prior to 1800 ==
=== The gunmen of Morocco versus the Songhay ===
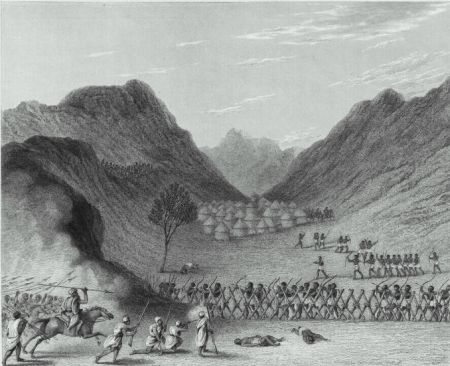
Musket-armed troops from Morocco made impressive initial gains in conquering the Songhay, but became bogged down in a protracted war. This pattern was to be repeated across Africa in later centuries as non-African forces were confronted.

The case of the Moroccan invasion of the Songhay Empire, circa 1591 illustrates the transformational power of the gun, but also the power of irregular warfare in Africa. This pattern was to be repeated in later centuries, on into the 20th as African forces contended with European invaders. The Sultan of Morocco sought to bring the lucrative trade in salt, slaves and especially the gold of the Songhay kingdom under his control. A force of some 4,000 well-trained mercenaries armed with guns was thus dispatched to bring it to heel. Organization of the invasion force was impressive, with some 8,000 camels in support, sapper units, and abundant supplies of gunpowder and lead. There were about 2,000 infantry arquebusiers, 500 mounted gunmen, and a miscellany of other forces, including 1500 mounted lancers. In sum, the Moroccan expedition was a professional, well-equipped one, with armaments comparable to most 16th-century Mediterranean states.

Opposing it were the legions of Songhai, numbering some 12,500 cavalry and 30,000 infantry mainly armed with bows and arrows, and spears. The Moroccans left Marrakesh in October 1590 and after a hard march across desert terrain, reached the Niger River in February 1591. The hastily assembled forces of Songhai met the Moroccans at Tondibi, and according to contemporary accounts fought bravely. Disciplined firepower by the Moroccans however turned the fray into a debacle for the Songhai. They withdrew with heavy losses. The victorious Moroccans however found the climate and conditions hard after the initial triumph. Their attempts to consolidate control sparked a native resistance movement. A protracted resistance war had begun that lasted some 20 years. Additional Moroccan troops arrived and the Songhay resistance relocated to more defensible terrain- swampy woodlands and forest. In time, Moroccan forces became bogged down, despite their superiority in firepower, they faced losses caused by climate, disease, and rebel attacks using mobile and guerrilla warfare. By 1610, the Moroccan forces had deteriorated significantly, and both strength and influence faded. Over time the Moroccans were absorbed into the local Niger cities, and the Songhai empire crumbled into a fragmented pattern of anarchy and competing warlord fiefdoms.

The Timbuktu historian al Sadi cast the Moroccan incursion in negative terms: "The Sudan was one of God's most favored countries in prosperity and fertility at the time the expeditionary force entered the country. Now, all that has changed. Security has given place to danger, prosperity to misery and calamity. Disorder spreading and intensifying has become universal." The invasion showed the transformational power of firearms in Africa where wielded by disciplined troops, often to dire effect on local peoples and polities. This was a lesson that was to be repeated some 200 years later when Europeans advanced for their colonial conquests.

=== Indigenous development and change: the legions of Benin ===
The kingdom of Benin offers a snapshot of a relatively well-organized and sophisticated African polity in operation before the major European colonial interlude. Military operations relied on a well trained disciplined force. At the head of the host stood the Oba of Benin. The monarch of the realm served as supreme military commander. Beneath him were subordinate generalissimos, the Ezomo, the Iyase, and others who supervised a Metropolitan Regiment based in the capital, and a Royal regiment made up of hand-picked warriors that also served as bodyguards. Benin's Queen Mother also retained her own regiment, the "Queen's Own." The Metropolitan and Royal regiments were relatively stable semi-permanent or permanent formations. The Village Regiments provided the bulk of the fighting force and were mobilized as needed, sending contingents of warriors upon the command of the king and his generals. Formations were broken down into sub-units under designated commanders. Foreign observers often commented favorably on Benin's discipline and organization as "better disciplined than any other Guinea nation", contrasting them with the slacker troops from the Gold Coast.

Until the introduction of guns in the 15th century, traditional weapons like the spear and bow held sway. They Portuguese were the first to bring firearms, and by 1645, matchlock, wheelock and flintlock muskets were being imported into Benin. Firepower made the armies of Benin more efficient, and led to several triumphs over regional rivals. Efforts were made to reorganize a local guild of blacksmiths in the 18th century to manufacture light firearms, but dependence on imports was still heavy. Before the coming of the gun, guilds of blacksmiths were charged with war production- particularly swords and iron spearheads.

Benin's tactics were well organized, with preliminary plans weighed by the Oba and his sub-commanders. Logistics were organized to support missions from the usual porter forces, water transport via canoe, and requisitioning from localities the army passed through. Movement of troops via canoes was critically important in the lagoons, creeks and rivers of the Niger Delta, a key area of Benin's domination. Tactics in the field seem to have evolved over time. While the head on clash was well known, documentation from the 18th century shows greater emphasis on avoiding continuous battle lines, and more effort to encircle an enemy (ifianyako).

Fortifications were important in the region and numerous military campaigns fought by Benin's soldiers revolved around sieges. As noted above, Benin's military earthworks are the largest of such structures in the world, and Benin's rivals also built extensively. Barring a successful assault, most sieges were resolved by a strategy of attrition, slowly cutting off and starving out the enemy fortification until it capitulated. On occasion however, European mercenaries were called on to aid with these sieges. In 1603–04 for example, European cannon helped batter and destroy the gates of a town near present-day Lagos, allowing 10,000 warriors of Benin to enter and conquer it. In payment the Europeans received one woman captive each and bundles of pepper. The example of Benin shows the genius of indigenous military systems, but also the role outside influences and new technologies brought to bear. This is a normal pattern among many nations and was to be reflected across Africa as the 19th century dawned.

=== The warrior hosts of Kongo ===
The warrior hosts of Angola relied on a relatively open formation, but sometimes deployed central, wing and reserve forces against both indigenous opponents and the Portuguese.

The Kongo region (modern day Angola, western Democratic Republic of the Congo, southern Republic of the Congo) exhibits a number of indigenous military systems, particularly by such kingdoms at Kongo and Ndongo. Several outstanding war-leaders appeared in this area, including the redoubtable female ruler and field commander Nyazinga or Njinga. Accounts by Portuguese mercenaries, priests and travellers in the 16th and 17th centuries leave a vivid picture of the native military systems, which often defeated European plans and incursions. Such experiences put paid to the notion (advanced by some Portuguese of the time) that the Africans would be defeated as easily as the Inca or Aztecs by the appearance of horses, guns and cannon.

Recruitment, organization and special units. The bulk of the fighting hosts were made of up general purpose levies and volunteers, but most Kongo polities maintained a small core of dedicated soldiers- nucleus of a standing army. Special detachments and commands called lucanzos were also used for various missions, and one such under a commander called Kakula ka Kabasa was defeated by the Portuguese in 1586 when crossing a river. Other special troops sometimes used included elite scouting units, the pombos, who sometimes ran with, and kept up with horses when they were used in the region. The pombos also performed pursuit duties. "Light" and "heavy" troop types were recognized. The light troops were far more numerous, and relied more on individual skill and technique (dodging spears for example). The "heavies" were more disciplined and relied on stronger defensive weapons and formations. A limited number such types operated in the Kongo kingdom, and were armed with shields, unlike other forces. They were reputedly the best soldiers in the country. Tactical units were recognized, from basic sections of 100–125 men, to larger units of 500, called mozengos or embalos. Groupings of these units made up a specific field force that could number up to 15,000 troops.

Weapons, battle formations and deployment. As noted previously, Kongo region battle formations were in relatively open order. This allowed the peculiar dodging, twisting and leaping noted in Portuguese accounts as warriors tried to avoid arrows and spears delivered by their opponents. A battle generally opened with a brief volley of arrows from relatively weak bows. Indeed, the bravest soldiers went into battle with only a few arrows, which were poisoned in some cases by a potent mixture called cabanzo. Once these were released, the contenders closed for a decision by hand-to-hand combat. Several thousand men could take place in these set-piece battles, and the affair was usually decided by superior skill and aggression. Basic formations were known, and three divisions were sometimes used- a center and two wings. A complex system of drums, horns and signals aided in maneuver of the warrior hosts, and distinctive battle-flags and pennants identified the location of elite troops or their commanders. See the Battle of Mbwila for a detailed example of a Kongo army in action, including the 3-part division of the host, and its use of reserves.

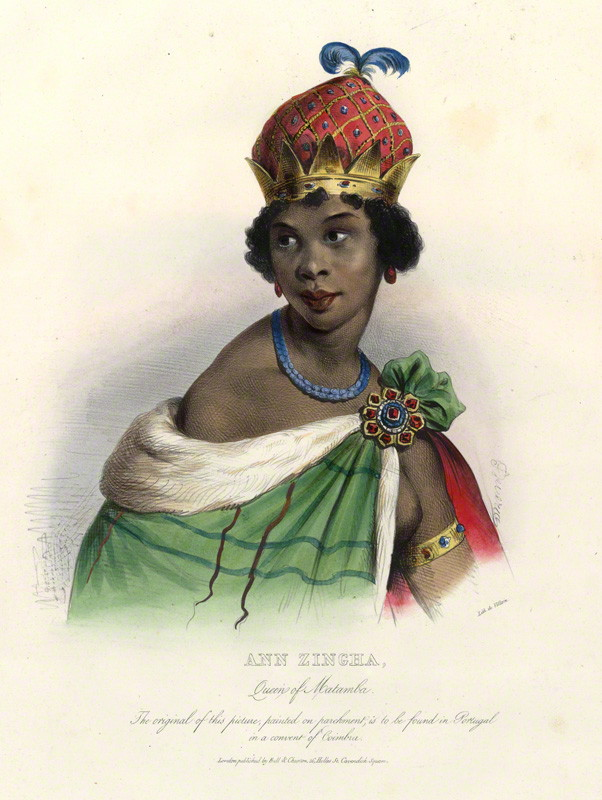
Queen Nzinga, depicted here in a fictionalised portrait, was one of the outstanding war leaders of the Kongo region.

Maneuver and logistics. Outflanking moves were popular, with light troops keeping the enemy busy in the center, while the wings extended. In some cases, a reserve force was kept on hand to exploit success, strike at a vulnerable point, or provide a rear guard to cover retreats. Reserve forces were also used as intimidating "stiffeners," forcing the cowardly and faltering back into the battle-line. Portuguese mercenaries sometimes excelled in this role while employed by the Kongo warlords. A Ndongo army attacked the Portuguese at Talandongo in 1583 using this 3-part division, as did the Portuguese force that confronted it. Nzinga also successfully used an outflanking gambit against the Portuguese, breaking their right wing at Cavanga, but saw defeat when her forces paused to loot, and exposed themselves to counterattack.

A broken army was usually hard to rally, and often did not reform on the battlefield but melted back to their home villages, to be perhaps reconstituted days later. Once regrouped and rearmed however they could be dangerous, as a defeated Portuguese column found in 1670 at Kitombo. Siege warfare was not highly developed, and most fortified places were only designed to hold out a short period before defenders retreated. Logistical problems plagued both attacker and defender, as the region's war cycle was not set for long campaigns.

Fortifications. Angolan armies at times made extensive use of fortifications. In a 1585 campaign against the Portuguese, the Ndongo for example constructed palisaded camps, each a day's journey apart. Use of strong defensive positions on hilltops or in forests was also common, as was the use of fortifications in offensive maneuvers. The Imbangala for example usually built a strong fort in enemy territory to bait opponents into exhausting their strength against it. Some of these positions could be quite formidable, with trenches, parapets, hidden roads, sharpened "punji" stake traps, mutually supporting bulwarks, and covered trenches to protect against artillery.

Two-way borrowing and adaptation. Firearms were gradually adopted by the Angolan militaries and used alongside customary fighting implements. Soldiers from the state of Kasanje in the 18th century for example, marched with bows and lances as well as muskets. Their gunmen were considered to be the equal of the Portuguese in competence. While Portuguese mercenaries and armies armed with muskets made a substantial showing in military terms, it was only until the end of the 18th century than indigenous forces incorporated them on a large scale. Other gunpowder weapons like artillery served the Portuguese well in breaking up enemy attacks or against fortifications. African systems like that of Kongo also gradually adopted artillery though on a much more limited scale. Ironically the Portuguese were sometimes more effective because of non-firearm weapons, such as body armor, swords and pikes.

The exchange of techniques and approaches was not always one way. While the Kongo kingdoms gradually adopted European technology, the Portuguese themselves borrowed and adapted African war practices to make themselves more effective against their opponents. In one engagement, the Battle of Kitombo, in 1670, the Portuguese armed themselves with native shields, hoping to demonstrate their prowess with these and their swords. The Portuguese adopted some indigenous practices such as the use of quilted cotton armor, proof against arrows and light spears. They also drew heavily on native allies, keeping a small nucleus of European troops, and a large body of indigenous warriors- with each force fighting in its own style. This is similar to the Kongo use of allied forces. The Europeans also adopted the looser formation of the native armies, discarding rigid squares of musketeers for more maneuverable and flexible configurations.

== Naval warfare ==
=== Carthage ===
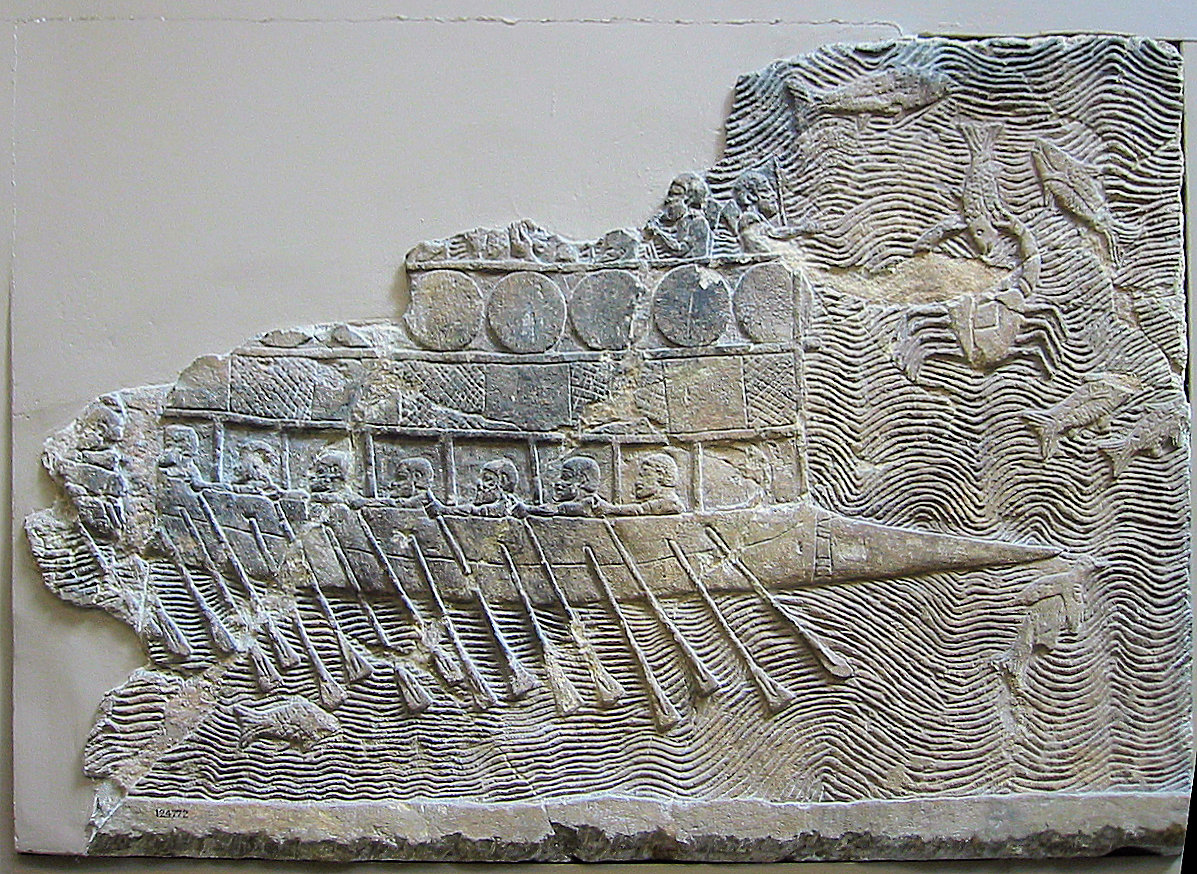
Warship built and manned by Phoenicians employed by the Assyrian king Sennacherib.

Typical of Phoenician settlements, the navy of Carthage was the city's military backbone, and the prime force that dominated the Western Mediterranean at the height of Carthage's power. The city boasted fine natural harbors and its fleet included large numbers of quadriremes and quinqueremes, warships with four and five ranks of rowers. Polybius wrote in the sixth book of his History that the Carthaginians were, "more exercised in maritime affairs than any other people," and Carthaginian sea power was the key factor in its rise. Relying heavily on the skills of its sailors and rowers, the maneuverable Carthaginian ships struck from Sicily to Spain, and dealt several defeats to its adversaries, including Rome. The Romans however were masters at copying and adapting the technology of other peoples. According to Polybius, the Romans seized a shipwrecked Carthaginian warship, and used it as a blueprint for a massive naval build-up, adding its own refinements – the corvus – which allowed an enemy vessel to be "gripped" and boarded for hand-to-hand fighting. This negated initially superior Carthaginian seamanship and ships.

=== Egypt ===
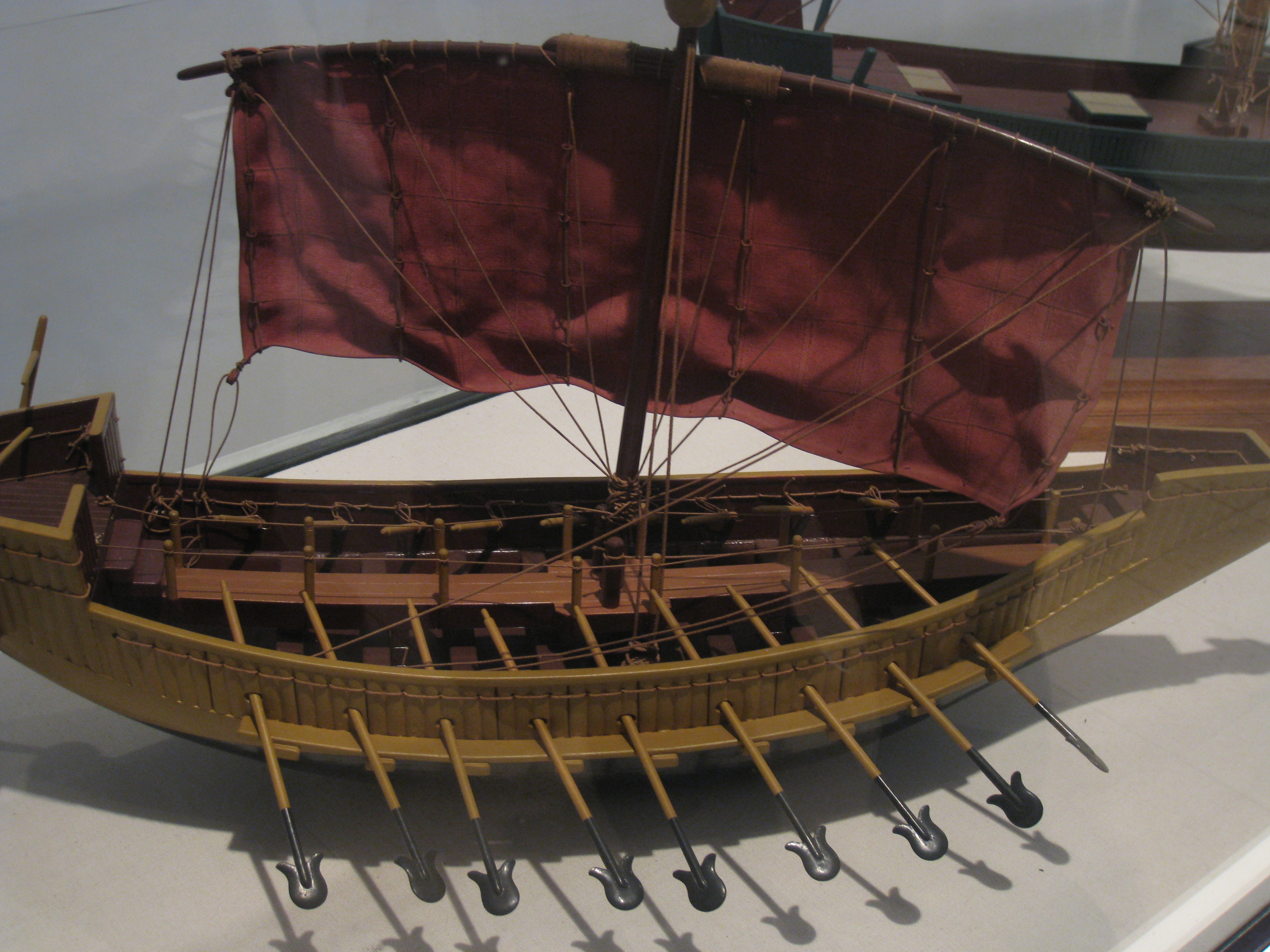
A modern model of an Egyptian warship from 1200 BC.

Egyptian naval warfare goes back millennia with the use of river vessels and ships on the Nile, the Red Sea and the Mediterranean. Three types of boats are documented in the Pre-Dynastic period: papyrus, ceremonial, and war canoes. Papyrus style craft are still found in Africa, such as in Lake Tana in Ethiopia and some waterways of Chad. The war canoes were the most important manifestations of naval forces during this early period. They were typically a long, thin shape with two rows of paddlers, papyrus shelters in the middle and steering oar in the bow. Construction was of wooden planks, sewn together. Crew capacity for large boats rivaled those later seen in West Africa, with some war canoes accommodating up to 80 oarsmen. Control of war canoes seem to have become more centralized as rising southern hegemons began to dominate the freer-wheeling trade and raiding of earlier Nile River times, according to one Australian naval study of ancient Egyptian maritime power. Military operations involved some expeditions of 1000 to 2000 men and up to 50 war boats. The earliest evidence of naval warfare in Africa or elsewhere is documented on the Gebel el Arak knife, from southern Egypt, which depict war canoes and a variety of other boats. The contenders are indigenous, with similar attire and weapons.

Sixth Dynasty reliefs show sea-borne ships transporting Egyptian troops to Phoenicia and Canaan. Early seagoing boats were relatively simple with rectangular sail, and steering rudder, but reliefs from the New Kingdom show greater sophistication, including requests that foreign builders from Cyprus construct boats for the Egyptian navy. Ships provided troop and supply transport for operations in Phoenicia, Aram Damascus and Canaan. The defeat of the Sea Peoples during the reign Ramses III marks the high-water point of Egyptian naval prowess. Most fighting ships carried 50 fighting men, with almost half sometimes doubling as rowers. Tactics include ramming, blasting opposing ships with slings and bows, and grappling followed by boarding for hand-to-hand combat. Ship construction was not as sophisticated as that of the Carthaginians, but fighting boats during the Sea People War show high bulwarks that functioned protectively, and space for 18 or more rowers. A single mast with a horizontal sail added propulsion to the rowing effort, with the boat's structural strength derived from a central gangway, rather than a deep keel. Generally ships served more heavily in a logistics role than in open warfare on the water.

=== Somalia ===
In ancient times, naval engagements between buccaneers and merchant ships were very common in the Gulf of Aden. In the early Middle Ages, a Somali army invaded Aden in Yemen and expelled the Malagasy rulers, and afterwards settled in the city and the surrounding valley. In the late medieval period, Somali navies regularly engaged their Portuguese counterparts at sea, the latter of whom were naturally attracted by the commercial reputation of the Somali coast. These tensions significantly worsened during the 16th century.

Over the next several decades Somali-Portuguese tensions would remain high and the increased contact between Somali sailors and Ottoman corsairs worried the Portuguese, prompting the latter to send a punitive expedition against Mogadishu under Joao de Sepuvelda. The expedition was unsuccessful. Ottoman-Somali cooperation against the Portuguese in the Indian Ocean reached an apogee in the 1580s, when Ajuuraan clients of the Somali coastal cities began to sympathize with the Omanis and Swahilis under Portuguese rule and sent an envoy to the Turkish corsair Mir Ali Bey for a joint expedition against the Portuguese. Bey agreed and was joined by a Somali fleet, which began attacking Portuguese colonies in Southeast Africa. The Somali-Ottoman offensive managed to drive out the Portuguese from several important cities such as Pate, Mombasa and Kilwa. However, the Portuguese governor sent envoys to India requesting a large Portuguese fleet. This request was answered and it reversed the previous offensive of the Muslims into one of defense. The Portuguese armada managed to re-take most of the lost cities and began punishing their leaders. However, they refrained from attacking Mogadishu.

=== West Africa ===
The African environment on the Western coast had certain limiting effects on the full development of naval warfare. Such limits include the lack of good natural harbors, contrary coastal currents, and obstructions like cataracts, sandbars and waterfalls that limit navigation on many of the great rivers of Africa. It took the coming of the steamship in the 19th century to overcome many of these barriers. Documentation on open-sea warfare is scarce. Nevertheless, numerous sources attest that the inland waterways of West Africa saw extensive use of war-canoes and vessels used for war transport where permitted by the environment. Most West African canoes were of single-log construction, carved and dug out from one massive tree trunk, although sewn plank construction is also documented. The primary method of propulsion was by paddle and in shallow water, poles. Sails were used in some areas for sea-going canoes off the Senegal and Guinea coasts- made of rush-matting, cloth or grass fibre. The silk cotton tree provided many of the most suitable logs for massive canoe building, and launching was via wooden rollers to the water. Boat building specialists were to emerge among certain tribes, particularly in the Niger Delta.

Most war-canoes were constructed of a single log, with inner space for rowers and warriors, and facilities such as hearths and sleeping quarters. Warriors and rowers were armed with bow, shield and spear. Firearms increasingly supplemented traditional weapons.

Some canoes were 80 feet in length, carrying 100 men or more. Documents from 1506 for example, refer to war-canoes on the Sierra Leone river, carrying 120 men. Others refer to Guinea coast peoples using canoes of varying sizes – some 70 feet in length, 7–8 feet broad, with sharp pointed ends, rowing benches on the side, and quarter decks or focastles build of reeds, and miscellaneous facilities such as cooking hearths, and storage spaces for crew sleeping mats. The warriors in some of these accounts were armed with spears, shields and arrows, and were expected to row as well. Each rower kept a bundle of throwing javelins and his shield next to him to repel enemy canoes. Larger West African empires could field vessels with substantial local capacity. According to one report the "Songhai kanta for example could carry up to 30 tons of goods, i.e. the load capacity of 1,000 men, 200 camels, 300 cattle or a flotilla of 20 regular canoes (Mauny, 1961). Some of these boats had an even greater load capacity of 50 to 80 tons (Tvmowski, 1967).”

The coming of firearms to the coastal peoples in the 17th and 18th centuries saw their appearance on war-canoes, and some kingdoms and peoples "upgraded" their vessels by adding small brass or iron cannon towards the end of the 18th century. Traditional arms however remained important, and could yield some success if local peoples were sufficiently unified to focus on external threats, rather than fight each other. On some occasions seaborne incursions by Portuguese vessels were sharply repulsed by African forces. In the 15th century for example the Portuguese engaged in a series of ruthless raids against the Senegal coast, hunting for slaves. While powerful on the open sea, the Portuguese ships were less impressive in the shallow waters near to shore. Using war canoes the African tribes of the coast fought back with lance, club, sword, and poisoned arrows. Ship-borne cannon fire made little impression on the jinking, weaving war boats, and while taking casualties from crossbow fire, and unable to board and take the enemy vessel, poisoned arrow missile fire from fast moving canoes hit at the European crews, and prevented them from landing to trade, raid or fight, an ultimately successful area denial or anti-access strategy. Seventeen African war-boats took part in this confrontation. The Portuguese were eventually forced to abandon raiding and set up peaceful trading arrangements with local African rulers using diplomacy. In some areas, war canoes and a unified network of regional lookouts also worked together to help protect African against slave raiders. In the 1500s for example a French vessel deemed suspicious off the Kongo coast was seized by war canoes. Where local peoples collaborated, or a centralized polity could mobilize resources to fight, coast watching systems developed over time that could move warnings some 50 to 60 miles a day overland when news of a hostile European ship incursion was received. This enabled local war canoes and land-based fighting groups to be deployed to the zone of confrontation. Historical records for the 17th and 18th centuries, document sixty-one slave ships being attacked by local African riverine or seaborne forces.

In war, the canoe performed an important logistics function. The empires of Mali and Songhay for example used canoes to move troops, horses and material quickly to many parts of the realm, as well as for trade and general transport. In Songhay, a chief of the waters oversaw all civil matters related to water transport, and a chief of canoes supervised naval operations. Big war canoes in this region drew a clear distinction between rowers, (usually 18 to 20) and marine troops (some 70–80 warriors). The boats were equipped with all the necessary provisions and supplies for their mission. As in ancient Egypt, open sea ship versus ship engagements were relatively uncommon, although in the lagoons, lakes and creeks, groups of war canoes sometimes clashed, utilizing a mix of traditional and modern weapons.

== Summary ==
Naval warfare on the open sea did not occur much outside North and Northeast Africa. However, on inland waterways, massive war canoes, some carrying over 120 men, appear in both West and Southeast Africa. Here two kingdoms face off for a naval clash on the Southeast African Great Lakes.

Blended mix of traditional and new in local environments. African military systems prior to 1800 show the full range of change and evolution seen in military developments elsewhere, and old methods co-existed with new technology in many parts of Africa. The gun for example was implemented slowly on European battlefields, co-existing with the pike and bow for long periods. African systems show the same pattern. This blended pattern persists from ancient times in Africa. The introduction of the more powerful composite bow in ancient Egypt for example did not fully displace the one piece self-bow used by the region's archers for centuries. The introduction of horses and guns had an uneven impact on African military systems. Horses brought extensive mobility, but their expansion was limited by cost and environmental factors such as the tsetse fly belt, although horse-breeding was substantial in some regions. Generally cavalry forces in Africa worked closely with masses of traditional infantry.

Limitations of mere outside technology on local battlefields. Gunpowder weapons, originally developed in China, were also introduced into native military systems over the centuries. In many areas such as Benin or Dahomey they sparked far-reaching changes, but in others they were of limited utility, or simply incorporated as supplements to an already established military structure. Outside technology was not the decisive factor in many conflicts. European artillery for example, while of unmistakable value in siege operations against well articulated structures such as gates and walls, were of limited utility against well placed African earthworks. Early European muskets greatly increased killing power but their slow-rate of fire (some three rounds per minute or less, with effective ranges around 50 yards- according to one study) was unimpressive, and rendered musketeers vulnerable to the quick charges or arrow volleys of motivated opponents. Angola serves as a test bed in many ways for outside technology in African warfare, and the Portuguese attempted direct conquest with their own weapons, including the use of heavy body armor. However the record shows several Portuguese defeats in spite of their advanced weaponry and organization, including almost complete annihilation of a major Portuguese force at the Battle of Kitombo.

Internal politics, diplomacy and leadership also key factors in military evolution. Some scholars maintain that the key to understanding African warfare lies in the political institutions and processes of the African landscape, where a massive number of small polities greatly outnumbered large empires or nations. The consolidation of these small polities into larger units sparked a growth in mass-recruited armies, a development that was more decisive overall than the appearance of gunpowder weapons. The Asante for example rose to power first through larger mass armies equipped with traditional bows, arrows and spears. Firearms were only to come later, after the crucial formative period. The key driver in the development of African military systems is thus the internal dynamics of particular indigenous states or kingdoms. The deployment of technology was ultimately shaped in this context.

== See also ==
- African military systems (1800-1900)
- African military systems after 1900
- Ashanti Empire
- Military of the Ashanti Empire
- Military history of Africa
- Mali Empire
- Military history of the Mali Empire
- Kingdom of Ndongo
- Kingdom of Matamba
- Kingdom of Kongo
- Nzinga of Ndongo and Matamba
- Battle of Mbwila
- Battle of Zama

== Bibliography ==
- Goldsworthy, Adrian The Punic Wars, (Cassell 2000) ISBN 0304352845
- Hallet, Robin Africa to 1875, University of Michigan Press: 1970
- July, Robert Pre-Colonial Africa, Charles Scribner, 1975
- Osadolor, Osarhieme Benson, "The Military System of Benin Kingdom 1440–1897]," (UD), Hamburg University: 2001 copy
- Thornton, John Kelly Warfare in Atlantic Africa, 1500–1800, Routledge: 1999 ISBN 1857283937
