= Battle of Kitombo =

1670 battle

- Part of Kongo Civil War
Date	18 October 1670
Location	Kitombo, Angola
Result	Soyo victory

Belligerents
Kongo states of Soyo and Ngoyo	Portuguese Empire: Portuguese West Africa

Commanders and leaders
Count Estêvão Da Silva	Commander João Soares de Almeida

Strength
Unknown number of musketeers, heavy infantry and bowmen 4 Dutch light field pieces	Unknown number of irregular bowmen Unknown number of auxiliary Imbangala; 400–500 Portuguese musketeers 4 light cannons and a detachment of cavalry

Casualties and losses
Unknown	Heavy

The Battle of Kitombo was a military engagement between forces of the BaKongo state of Soyo, formerly a province of the Kingdom of Kongo, and the Portuguese colony of Angola on 18 October 1670. Earlier in the year a Portuguese expeditionary force had invaded Soyo with the intention of ending its independent existence. The Soyo were supported by the Kingdom of Ngoyo, which provided men and equipment, and by the Dutch, who provided guns, light cannons and ammunition. The combined Soyo-Ngoyo force was led by Estêvão Da Silva, and the Portuguese by João Soares de Almeida. Both commanders were killed in the battle, which resulted in a decisive victory for Soyo. Few, if any, of the invaders escaped death or capture.

== Background ==
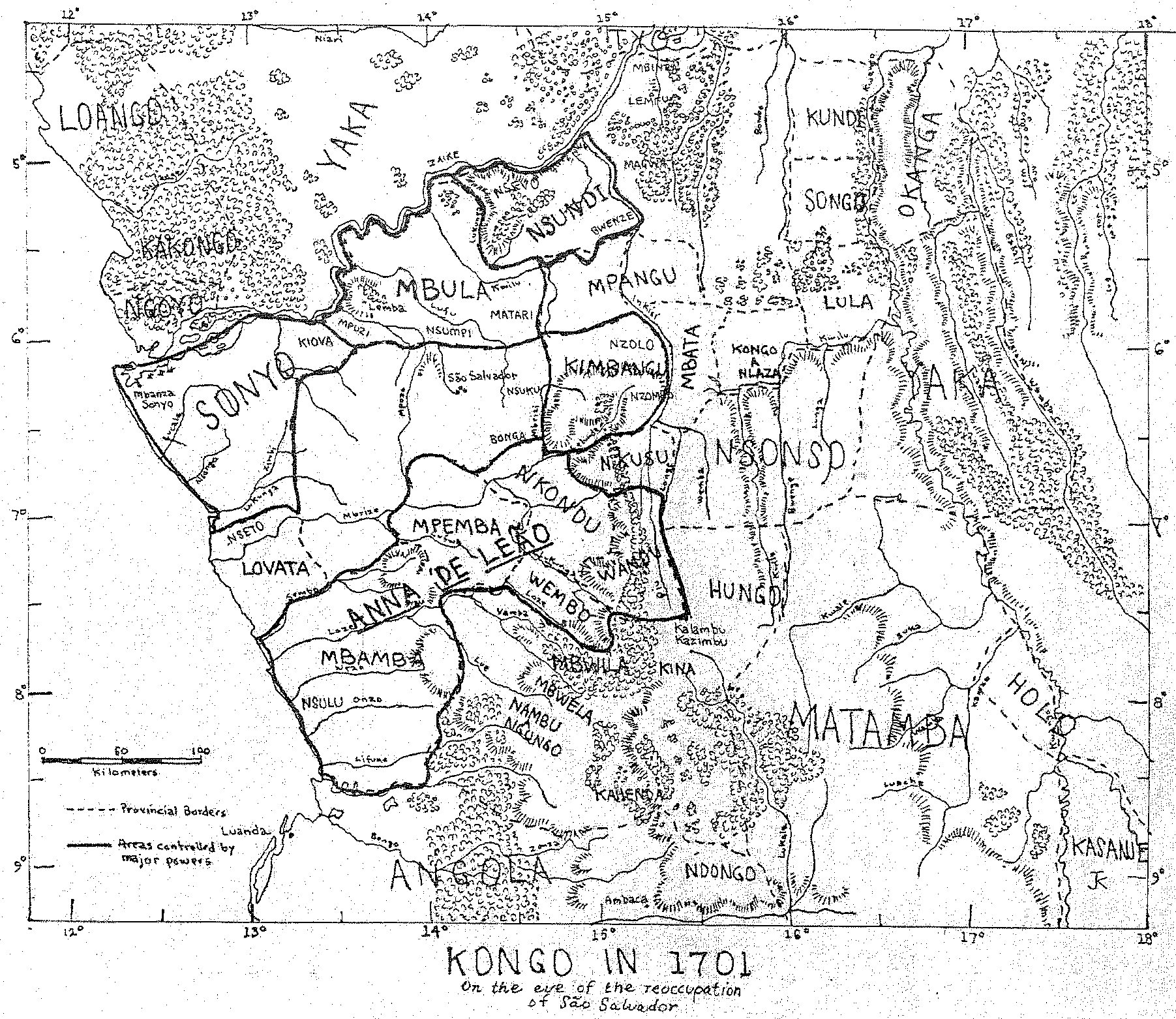
The Kingdom of Kongo showing major factions in the civil war

The Portuguese had long traded with the Kingdom of Kongo, mostly viewing it as a source of slaves. In 1665 a Portuguese army invaded the Kingdom and defeated its army at the Battle of Mbwila. The engagement resulted in a crushing Portuguese victory ending in the death of the Mwenekongo António I and most of the kingdom's nobility, the disbandment of its army and the installation of a Portuguese puppet ruler. Afterwards, Kongo erupted in a brutal civil war between the House of Kinlaza, which had ruled under the dead king, and the House of Kimpanzu. Soyo, home to many Kimpanzu partisans, was eager to take advantage of the chaos. Within a few months of the national tragedy at Mbwila, the Prince of Soyo Paulo da Silva invaded the capital of São Salvador and installed his protégé, Afonso II on the throne. This happened again in 1669 with the placement of Álvaro IX on the throne. By this time both the Portuguese and central authority in Kongo were growing tired of Soyo's meddling. While the Kinlaza and others in Kongo lived in fear of a Soyo invasion, the governor of Luanda wished to curb the growing power of Soyo. With access to Dutch merchants willing to sell them guns and cannons plus diplomatic access to the Pope, Soyo was on its way to becoming as powerful as Kongo had been before Mbwila. King Rafael I of Kongo, driven by Soyo from his capital, fled to Luanda, where he sought Portuguese aid to restore him to the throne. In return, he promised Portugal money, mineral concessions and the right to build a fortress in Soyo to keep out the Dutch.

== Preparations ==
The governor of Luanda, Francisco de Távora, ordered a force of Portuguese, augmented by native allies such as the feared Imbangala, into Soyo to crush the kingdom once and for all. It was led by João Soares de Almeida, with the most powerful colonial force that had been organised in Central Africa up until then. It included 400 musketeers, a rare detachment of cavalry, 4 light cannons, an unknown number of levee bowmen, Imbangala auxiliaries and even some naval vessels.

The then Prince of Soyo, Paulo da Silva, received word of the impending invasion and prepared his army to meet it. In a surprising show of post-Mbwila BaKongo unity, Soyo called on the kingdom of Ngoyo for assistance. Ngoyo had at one time been at least nominally subordinate to the king of Kongo but had grown apart from the state during the 17th century. Ngoyo, which boasted a large fleet of shallow draught craft, sent many soldiers to its southern neighbour in anticipation of the attack.

Few details exist on exactly how the campaign was fought. It was divided into two phases with the first being the Battle of Mbidizi River, a brief but bloody engagement north of the Mbidizi river in June. Afterwards the Portuguese advanced deeper into Kongo.

== Battle ==
The decisive engagement of the campaign occurred near or at a wooded area called Nfinda Ngula near the large village of Kitombo in October. During the interval, both forces were able to reorganise and to replenish their supplies. The Soyo army used this time to re-equip themselves with more arms from their Dutch allies. The BaKongo forces regrouped at Nfinda Ngula, a densely forested area that had served Soyo well in their battles against Kongo during the invasions of Garcia II. The Soyo-Ngoyo army rallied around Estêvão Da Silva and his light artillery pieces. It proved difficult to access for the Portuguese artillery, allowing the allied force to use the Dutch light field pieces to good effect. They then charged and routed the Portuguese. The colonial army was comprehensively destroyed. The Portuguese not killed in the battle drowned attempting to flee across the river or were captured. Legend has it the captives were offered as white slaves to the Dutch. Its commander died during the battle. The number of casualties among the Soyo forces are unknown.

== Aftermath and peace ==
The Battle of Kitombo was a humiliating defeat for the Portuguese and a boon for the state of Soyo. Portuguese Angola remained hostile to Soyo and Kongo, but they dared not venture back. Soyo and the House of Kimpanzu became even more powerful in the politics of the region, but never attained the wealth of pre-Mbwila Kongo as the Portuguese had feared. The next prince of Soyo used the state's Dutch contacts, specifically through Capuchin missionaries, to persuade the Pope to intervene on their behalf. At the behest of the Soyo, the pope sent a papal nuncio to the King of Portugal who obtained an agreement recognising Soyo's independence and bringing an end to further attempts on its sovereignty.

== See also ==
- Kongo Civil War
- Battle of Mbidizi River
- Soyo
- Kingdom of Kongo
- History of Angola
- Angolan Wars
