= Battle of Mbwila =

1665 battle during the Portuguese colonisation of the Kingdom of Kongo

- Part of the Angolan Wars
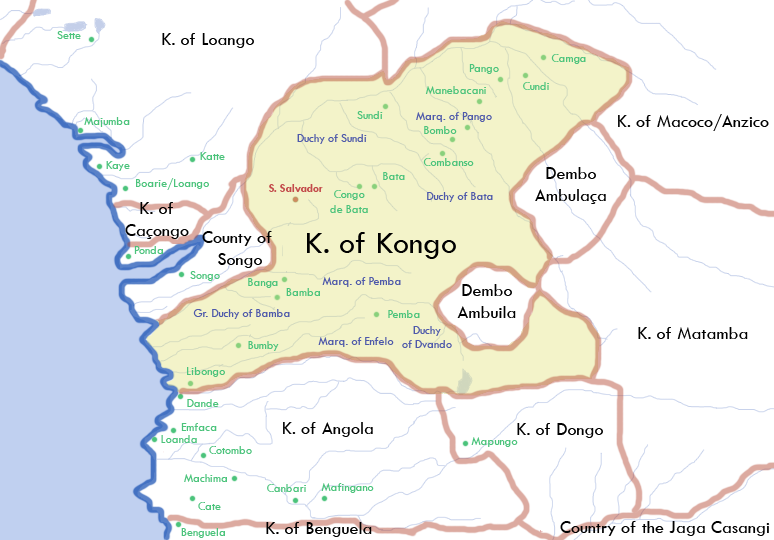
- A map of the Kingdom of Kongo, as of 1711.
Date	29 October 1665
Location	Mbwila (modern Angola)
Result	Portuguese victory

Belligerents
Kongo	Portugal

Commanders and leaders
King António I of Kongo †; Aqualtune (POW)	Captain Luís Lopes de Sequeira

Strength
21,900–29,000	14,150–14,500; 2 artillery pieces

Casualties and losses
5,000 men killed or captured including the King, his two sons, his two nephews, four governors, various court officials, 95 title holders and 400 other nobles	Unknown

Battle of Mbwila (also the Battle of Ambuila, Battle of Mbuila, or Battle of Ulanga) occurred on 29 October 1665 in which Portuguese forces defeated the forces of the Kingdom of Kongo and decapitated king António I of Kongo, also called Nvita a Nkanga.

== Origins of the war ==
Although Kongo and Portugal had been trading partners and participated in a cultural exchange during the sixteenth century, the establishment of the Portuguese colony of Angola in 1575 put pressure on that relationship. Kongo initially assisted Portugal in Angola, sending an army to rescue the Portuguese governor Paulo Dias de Novais when his war against the nearby African kingdom of Ndongo failed in 1579. But subsequently as Portugal became stronger it began to press harder, and in 1622 severed even the cautiously friendly relationship of the earlier period when a large Portuguese army invaded southern Kongo and defeated the local forces at the Battle of Mbumbi. Pedro II, king of Kongo at the time, responded by personally leading a force at the battle of Mbanda crushing the invasion. He then wrote to the Dutch Estates General, proposing an alliance with the Dutch to drive the Portuguese out of Angola altogether. This alliance did not finally come to fruition until 1641 when Dutch forces took Luanda and were joined by an army from Kongo, forcing the Portuguese to withdraw into the interior. However, they were not able to finish the Portuguese, and as a result the Portuguese eventually forced the Dutch out in 1648.

In the years following the Dutch withdrawal, Angolan governors sought to obtain revenge against Kongo and to support the slave trade with a highly aggressive policy. Included in this policy were attacks on the zone of small, semi-independent states called Dembos that separated Angola from Kongo. Both Kongo and Angola claimed authority over the Dembos. King António I, an aggressive monarch in his own right, was negotiating with Spain to renew an anti-Portuguese alliance, and also sent ambassadors into the Dembos areas to persuade them to join Kongo against the Portuguese, promising Spanish aid. In 1665, one of these small kingdoms, Mbwila, underwent a succession struggle and the various factions appealed to Kongo and Angola for aid. Both sides responded with armies.

== Battle ==
The core of the Portuguese force, commanded by Luís Lopes de Sequeira, was 450 musketeers and two light artillery pieces. There were soldiers from the Portuguese colony of Brazil, including some of African and Native American origin, as well as Imbangala and other African forces numbering about 15,000. The Kongo army included a large number of peasant archers, probably about 15,000, some 5,000 heavy infantry equipped with shields and swords, and a musket regiment of 380 men, 29 of them Portuguese led by Pedro Dias de Cabral.

Both armies were operating at some distance from their main bases. They had marched for days to reach the battlefield, along the valley of the Ulanga River just south of the capital of Mbwila. Steep hills and the river defined the east side of the battlefield, and lower ridges the west. The Portuguese forces took up positions between the two, with their African forces deployed on the flanks and the musketeers forming a diamond-shaped formation in the center, anchored by their artillery. The Imbangala forces were held in reserve.

António's army advanced into the Portuguese formation with a vanguard, followed by three divisions of his heavy infantry and the archers on the flanks. The Duke of Bengo commanded the reserve. In the initial stages of the battle, the Kongolese archers swept most of the African archers of the Portuguese forces from the field and then launched attacks against the Portuguese musketeers, supported by their own heavy infantry and musketeers. In spite of heavy fighting, the Kongolese were unable to break the Portuguese formation and António was killed in the final attempt. Most of the Kongo forces broke following the king's death. The survivors were only able to withdraw thanks to skillful rearguard action by the Duke of Bengo and the reserves.

More than 400 of Kongo's heavy infantry were killed in the encounter and many more of the archers. Along with these losses was the royal chaplain, the mixed-race Capuchin priest Francisco de São Salvador (Manuel Robrerdo in secular life). King António's young son of seven years was captured. After the battle, the head of the king or Manikongo was buried with ceremony by the Portuguese in the chapel of Our Lady of Nazareth situated on the Bay of Luanda, and the crown and sceptre of Kongo were sent to Lisbon as trophies.

== Aftermath ==
Portugal obtained an act of vassalage from D. Isabel, the regent of Mbwila, but was unable to exercise any real authority over the region once their forces had withdrawn. In 1693 they had to return to attempt to subdue the region again. The primary result in Kongo was that the absence of an immediate heir spun the country into civil war. This civil war, which raged for half a century, led to Kongo's decentralization and fundamental changes, leading to Kongolese historians, even in 1700, regarding the battle as a decisive turning point in their country's history.

After the battle many people, including nobles and members of the royal family, were captured. Some of these were enslaved and crossed the sea to the Portuguese colony of Brazil and maybe other places in the Americas. It is unknown what happened to most of them. But at some point before 1670, the sons of princess Aqualtune (who led a battalion during the battle), Ganga Zumba, his brother Ganga Zona, and their sister Sabina appeared enslaved in an engenho (sugar cane plantation) in the Captaincy of Pernambuco in Northeast Brazil. They led a rebellion at the engenho, escaped, and later formed their own kingdom of Quilombo dos Palmares, a Maroon nation which controlled large areas of northeast Brazil during the Dutch-Portuguese War.

Sabina bore a son Zumbi who, after being captured, was raised in a church and then escaped. Zumbi succeeded his uncle and became the king of Palmares and leader of the rebellion until being killed in 1695 by the Bandeirantes, after which the kingdom was destroyed. His son Camuanga succeeded him in leadership of the rebellion, but after this it is unknown what happened to them or their lineage. Zumbi today is considered a national hero in Brazil.

== See also ==
- African military systems to 1800
- African military systems after 1800
