= Military history of Africa =

The military history of Africa is one of the oldest military histories in the world. Africa is a continent of many regions with diverse populations speaking thousands of different languages and practicing an array of cultures and religions. These differences have also been the source of much conflict for millennia.

Like the history of Africa, military history on the continent is often divided by region. North Africa was part of the Mediterranean cultures and was integral to the military history of classical antiquity, and East Africa has historically had various states which have often warred with some the world's most powerful. The military history of modern Africa may be divided into three broad time periods: pre-colonial, colonial, and post-colonial.

== Antiquity ==
=== Ancient Egyptian and Nubian military history ===
In 3100 BC, Upper Egypt and Lower Egypt were united by Menes. The end of the Old Kingdom of Ancient Egypt ushered in a period of instability that was not stabilized until Mentuhotep II solidified his rule in about 2055 BC to begin the Middle Kingdom. This period came to end with the invasion of the Hyksos, who introduced the war chariot. This new technology was quickly adopted by the Egyptians, who succeeded in expelling the invaders at the start of the New Kingdom in the 16th century BC.

The revitalized Egyptians expanded north and east into Eurasia to the Aegean Sea and into much of the Levant, as far as the Euphrates River. Egypt also moved west into Libya and south into Sudan.

The gradual disintegration in the Twentieth Dynasty allowed the founding of the Kushite kingdoms of Nubia, centered on Napata. Kush reached a height under Piye, who conquered Egypt and founded the Twenty-fifth Dynasty. However, the Kushites were gradually driven back to Napata by an Assyrian invasion and then the resistance of the Twenty-sixth Dynasty kings.

=== Ancient Aksumite military history ===
The Kingdom of Axum had one of the most powerful militaries in the world during its era. It was compared with Rome and other world powers of the time. The Empire ruled vast territories from today's western Yemen, Djibouti, southwestern Saudi Arabia, eastern Sudan, most of Eritrea and the north and central part of present-day Ethiopia.

== Military history of modern Africa ==
=== Adal-Ethiopian wars ===
While European exploration began with mapping of the western coasts by the Portuguese, the large-scale intervention did not occur until much later. During the 1529–1543 campaign of Ahmad ibn Ibrahim al-Ghazi, which brought three-quarters of Christian Abyssinia (modern-day Ethiopia) under the power of the Muslim Sultanate of Adal (modern-day Somalia. With an army mainly composed of Somalis, which was equipped by the Ottoman empire with musketeers and troops. However, in the Battle of Wayna Daga, a combined Ethiopian-Portuguese force (including Portuguese musketeers) was able to kill Imam Ahmad in retaliation for the death of the former Portuguese commander, Cristovão da Gama and take back Abyssinian territories.

=== Ajuran-Portuguese wars ===
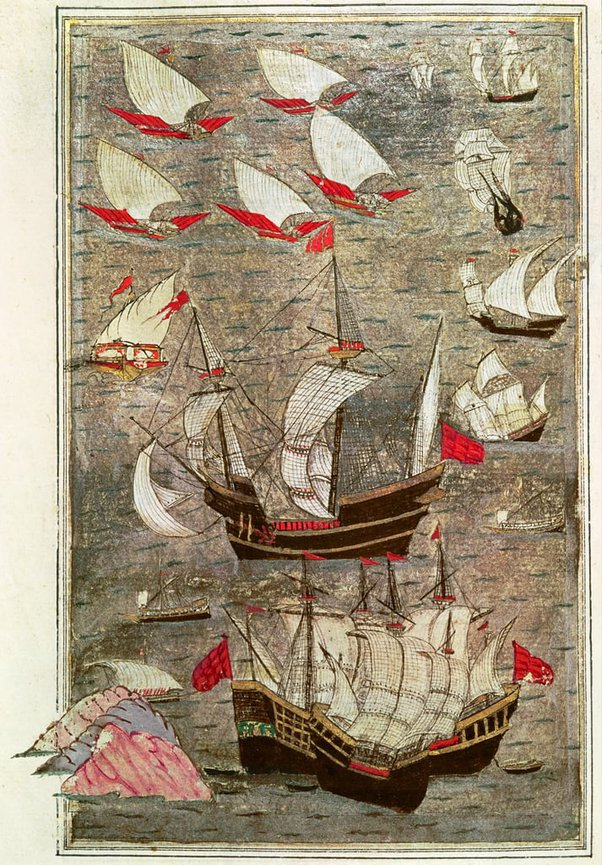
The Ottomans regularly aided the Ajurans in their struggles with the Portuguese in the Indian Ocean.

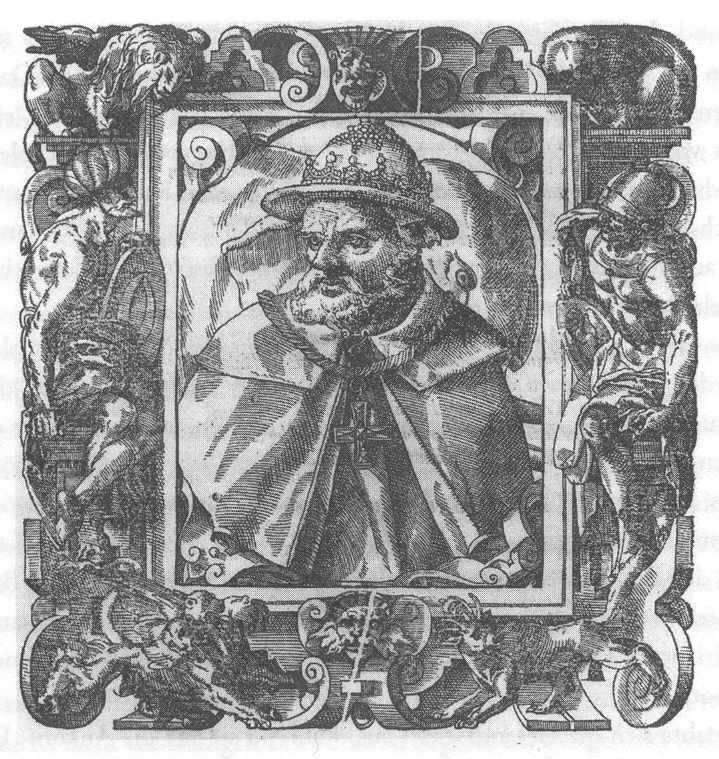
During the Battle of Barawa, Tristão da Cunha was wounded and requested to be knighted by Albuquerque.

The European Age of Discovery brought Europe's then superpower the Portuguese empire to the coast of East Africa, which at the time enjoyed a flourishing trade with foreign nations. The wealthy southeastern city-states of Kilwa, Mombasa, Malindi, Pate and Lamu were all systematically sacked and plundered by the Portuguese. Tristão da Cunha then set his eyes on Ajuran territory, where the battle of Barawa was fought. After a long period of engagement, the Portuguese soldiers burned the city and looted it. However, fierce resistance by the local population and soldiers resulted in the failure of the Portuguese to permanently occupy the city, and the inhabitants who had fled to the interior would eventually return and rebuild the city. After Barawa, Tristão would set sail for Mogadishu, which was the richest city on the East African coast. But word had spread of what had happened in Barawa, and a large troop mobilization had taken place. Many horsemen, soldiers and battleships in defense positions were now guarding the city. Nevertheless, Tristão still opted to storm and attempt to conquer the city, although every officer and soldier in his army opposed this, fearing certain defeat if they were to engage their opponents in battle. Tristão heeded their advice and sailed for Socotra instead. After the battle the city of Barawa quickly recovered from the attack.

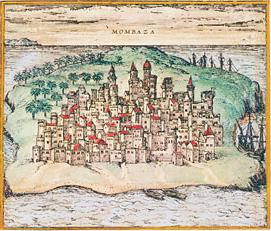
In 1660, the Portuguese in Mombasa surrendered to a joint Somali-Omani force.

Over the next several decades Somali-Portuguese tensions would remain high and the increased contact between Somali sailors and Ottoman corsairs worried the Portuguese who sent a punitive expedition against Mogadishu under João de Sepúlveda, which was unsuccessful. Ottoman-Somali cooperation against the Portuguese in the Indian Ocean reached a high point in the 1580s when Ajuran clients of the Somali coastal cities began to sympathize with the Arabs and Swahilis under Portuguese rule and sent an envoy to the Turkish corsair Mir Ali Bey for a joint expedition against the Portuguese. He agreed and was joined by a Somali fleet, which began attacking Portuguese colonies in Southeast Africa.

The Somali-Ottoman offensive managed to drive out the Portuguese from several important cities such as Pate, Mombasa and Kilwa. However, the Portuguese governor sent envoys to Portuguese India requesting a large Portuguese fleet. This request was answered and it reversed the previous offensive of the Muslims into one of defense. The Portuguese armada managed to re-take most of the lost cities and began punishing their leaders, but they refrained from attacking Mogadishu, securing the city's autonomy in the Indian Ocean. Ajuran's Somali forces would eventually militarily defeat the Portuguese. The Ottoman Empire would also remain an economic partner of the Somalis. Throughout the 16th and 17th centuries successive Somali Sultans defied the Portuguese economic monopoly in the Indian Ocean by employing a new coinage which followed the Ottoman pattern, thus proclaiming an attitude of economic independence in regard to the Portuguese.

=== Independence struggles ===
Starting in the 1950s, anti-colonial movements agitated for independence from the colonial powers. This agitation, coupled with an international system that was increasingly hostile to colonialism, led killed to a process of decolonization that was often violent.

The first successful anti-colonial armed struggle in Africa was the Tunisian War of Independence (1952–1956), but the most famous may be the Algerian War of Independence (1954–1962), both against France.

Other example of successful armed resistance is the Portuguese Colonial War (1961–1974), which led to the independence of Angola, Guinea-Bissau and Mozambique. The Rhodesian Bush War (1966–1979) was not against a colonial metropole, but the minority white government of Ian Smith.

These national liberation movements were informed by the successful guerrilla warfare doctrine used in the Indonesian National Revolution (1945–1949) and the First Indochina War (1946–1954). The insurgents' goal was thus not to win the war — and no colonial army was ever defeated — but simply not to lose, thus making the conduct of the war unbearable for the colonial power over the long term.

World War II parties

The writings of Frantz Fanon on the Algerian conflict became hugely influential on later African conflicts. These conflicts benefited from internal ideological and organizational cohesion, sympathetic diplomatic backing in global forums, some financial backing (in particular from the Nordic states) and military training and supplies from the Soviet bloc.

Two national liberation movements that became violent and were unsuccessful in that they did not lead to de facto capitulation and independence were the Mau Mau Uprising (1952–1960). Colonial security forces were reinforced by regular troops from the metropolitan power and the insurgent groups were hampered by a lack of military equipment and training, as well as the absence of a friendly adjoining country offering sanctuary.

There have been two liberation movements against an African power over the borders drawn during the colonial period. The Polisario Front began a struggle in 1973 for the independence of Western Sahara against Spain and then Morocco, when the North African country invaded.

In Eritrea, the Eritrean Liberation Front and later Eritrean People's Liberation Front carried out an independence struggle against Ethiopia that culminated successfully in 1991.

In two special cases, and in contrast to these bloody wars, both Namibia's South-West Africa People's Organisation (1960s–1990) and the activities of Umkhonto we Sizwe, the military wing of South Africa's African National Congress, utilized armed conflict comparatively less in their struggles.

=== Post-colonial ===
Africa's wars and conflicts, 1980–96 Major wars/conflicts (100,000 + casualties) Minor wars/conflicts Other conflicts

African nations have made great efforts to respect international borders as inviolable for a long time. For example, the Organization of African Unity (OAU), which was established in 1963 and replaced by the African Union in 2002, set respect for the territorial integrity of each country as one of its principles in the OAU Charter. Indeed, compared with the formation of European countries, there have been fewer international conflicts in Africa over changing the borders, which has influenced country formation there and has enabled some countries to survive that might have been defeated and absorbed by others. Yet international conflicts have played out through support for proxy armies or rebel movements. Many states have experienced civil wars, including Rwanda, Sudan, Angola, Sierra Leone, Congo, Liberia, Ethiopia and Somalia. Wars of national liberation also often took up a Marxist, Marxist–Leninist, or Maoist character in ideological terms, where the independence of African nations was raised in Marxian terms. Early examples included the Union of the Peoples of Cameroon armed movement against French colonialism, a Marxist–Leninist insurgency, followed by similar movements in Congo (the Simba Rebellion). Che Guevara participated in the latter, and opined in 1967 that Africa was not ready for revolution. Despite this, in Zanzibar before and after unification with Tanzania, forms of socialism took hold. In Sudan under Gaafar Nimeiry, in Somalia under Siad Barre, in Ethiopia under the Dergue and Mengistu Haile Mariam, in Congo-Brazzaville under various administrations from the 1960s onwards, including that of Denis Sassou-Nguesso, in Benin under Mathieu Kérékou, in the Seychelles under France-Albert René, in Angola, Mozambique and Guinea-Bissau before Portugal's 1974 Carnation Revolution, Marxism–Leninism was fashionable. Even after 1990, there are some examples of Military Marxism, such as a militia established by Ernest Wamba-dia-Wamba in Eastern Congo in the 1990s.

The boundary marking a civil war is blurred in Africa as many civil wars involved foreign backers if not active belligerents. Libya's actively intervened into Chad with air forces, and France retaliated with support for the other side. Sudan experienced a prolonged civil war, resulting in the separation of South Sudan as an independent state. Similar to South Sudan, Eritrea won independence from Ethiopia. Congo's civil war involved seven states, among them Zimbabwe, Rwanda, and Uganda. Eritrea is under United Sanctions for its alleged support role in the civil conflict in southern Somalia. Sierra Leone's civil war was ended with the restoration of ousted civilian government by British and Nigerian forces. Angola's civil war involved Cuban, American and Chinese backing for differing groups.

== Military history of Africa by regions ==
=== Military history of Northern Africa ===
See List of conflicts in the Maghreb, History of North Africa, History of the Mediterranean region.

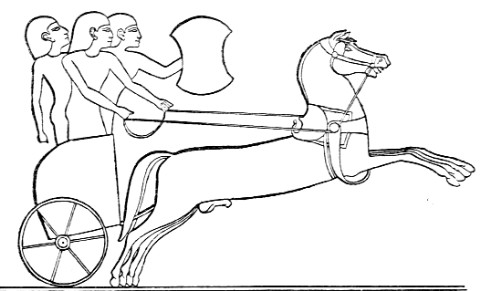
Hittite chariot (drawing of an Egyptian relief)

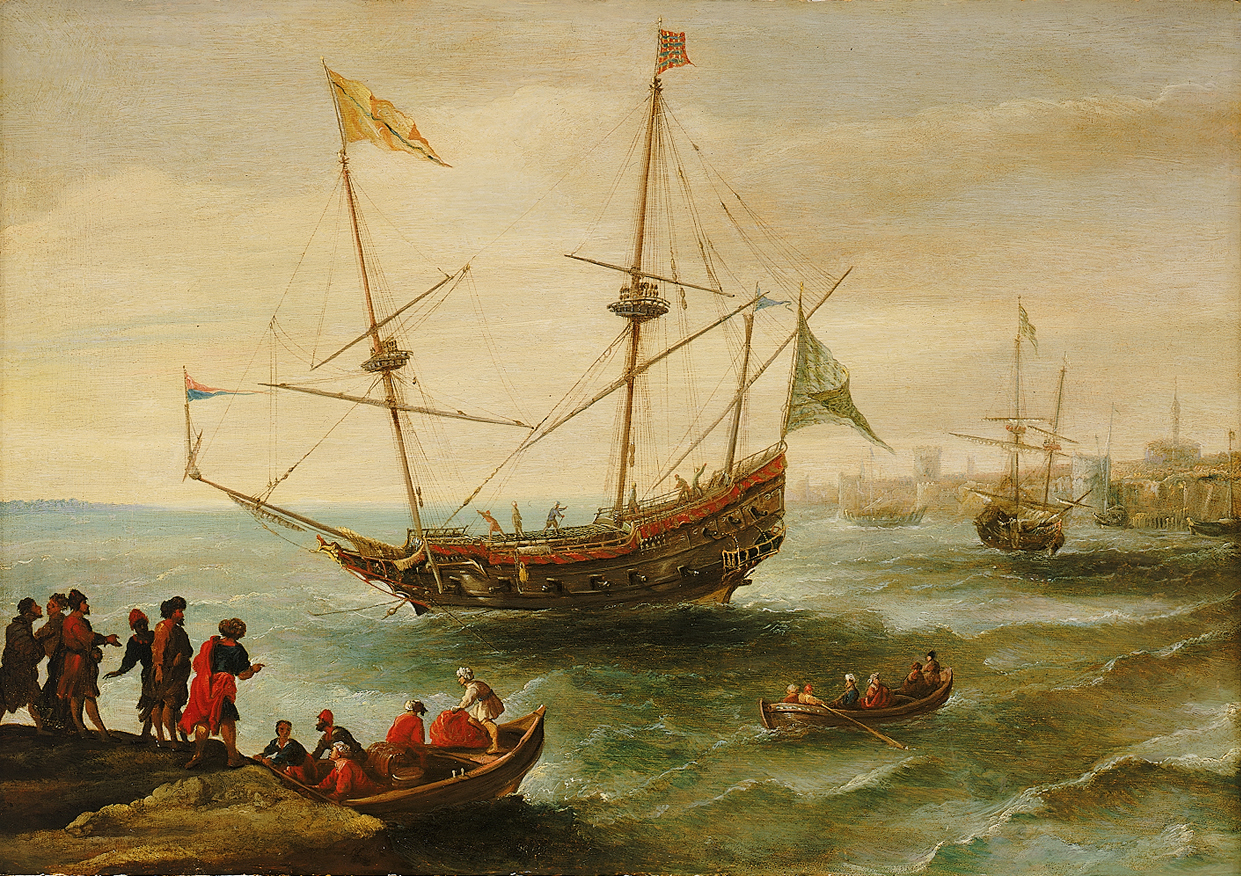
The Algerine, an Algerian battle ship manufactured in the port of Jijel during the Barbary corsairs era

North Africa and Southern Europe face each other across the Mediterranean Sea. Most of the southern areas of North Africa are cut off by the vast inhospitable Sahara desert. Therefore, the coastal areas have many resources to support the needs of large armies and the moderate-to-hot climate makes the movement of forces across vast stretches of land very feasible. North Africa has been the source of both cultural and economic interactions as well as military rivalries that became famous wars in history.

Egypt is located in Africa, and the Ancient Egyptian Empire was noted for its use of massed horse-drawn chariots in warfare, as well as fighting against invading empires from Babylonia, Assyria, and the Persian Empire.

Ancient Greece and the armies of Alexander the Great (336 BC–323 BC) invaded and conquered some parts of North Africa and his generals set up the Ptolemaic dynasty in Egypt. The armies of the Roman Republic (509 BC–31 BC) and the Roman Empire (31 BC–AD 476) subsequently conquered the entire coastal areas of North Africa. The people of Carthage fought the bloody and lengthy Punic Wars (264 BC–146 BC) against Rome.

Each century has seen the invasion of North Africa by various peoples, empires, nations and religions, and each in turn yielded its wars and conflicts.

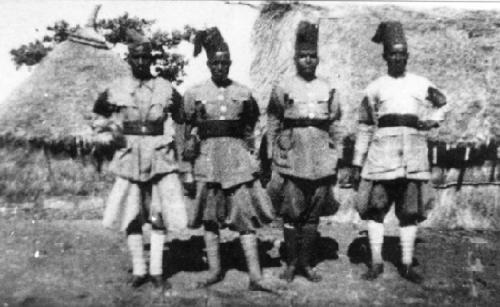
Group of Zaptié in Italian Somaliland in 1939

Beginning in the 7th century, the military victories of the Umayyads, the Abbasids, the Fatimids, the Mamluks and the Ottomans ensured and consolidated the strength and continuity of Islam in North Africa over many centuries.

Attacks by the Barbary pirates, based in the North African areas of Algeria, prompted the building of the United States Navy, including one of America's most famous ships, the USS Philadelphia, leading to a series of wars along the North African coast, starting in 1801. It was not until 1815 that naval victories ended tribute payments by the U.S., although some European nations continued annual payments until the 1830s. The United States Marine Corps' actions in these wars led to the line, "to the shores of Tripoli" in the opening of the Marine Hymn.

The arrival of modern colonialism, World War I and World War II brought armies from afar to fight in North Africa, often against each other and not always against the native inhabitants. Battles such as the Tunisia Campaign eventually yielded the first battlefield victories of the Allies of World War II against the Axis powers of World War II. These battles were fought and won by the Allies in North Africa such as at the Battle of El Alamein in 1942, one of the most significant and pivotal battles of that war, during the North African campaign. At the Battle of the Kasserine Pass, the Germans first faced the military of the United States.

When modern Islamic countries gained their independence in North Africa, often following serious warfare (such as during the Algerian War of Independence against the French), the Arab–Israeli conflict became the main focus of significant battles. During the 1973 Yom Kippur War, the Egyptian army broke through the Bar Lev Line, invading the Israeli-held Sinai Peninsula, resulting in UN cease-fire after United Nations Security Council Resolution 338, 339 and 340, which finally led to strategic and political gains for Egypt and Israel.

=== Military history of the Horn Africa ===
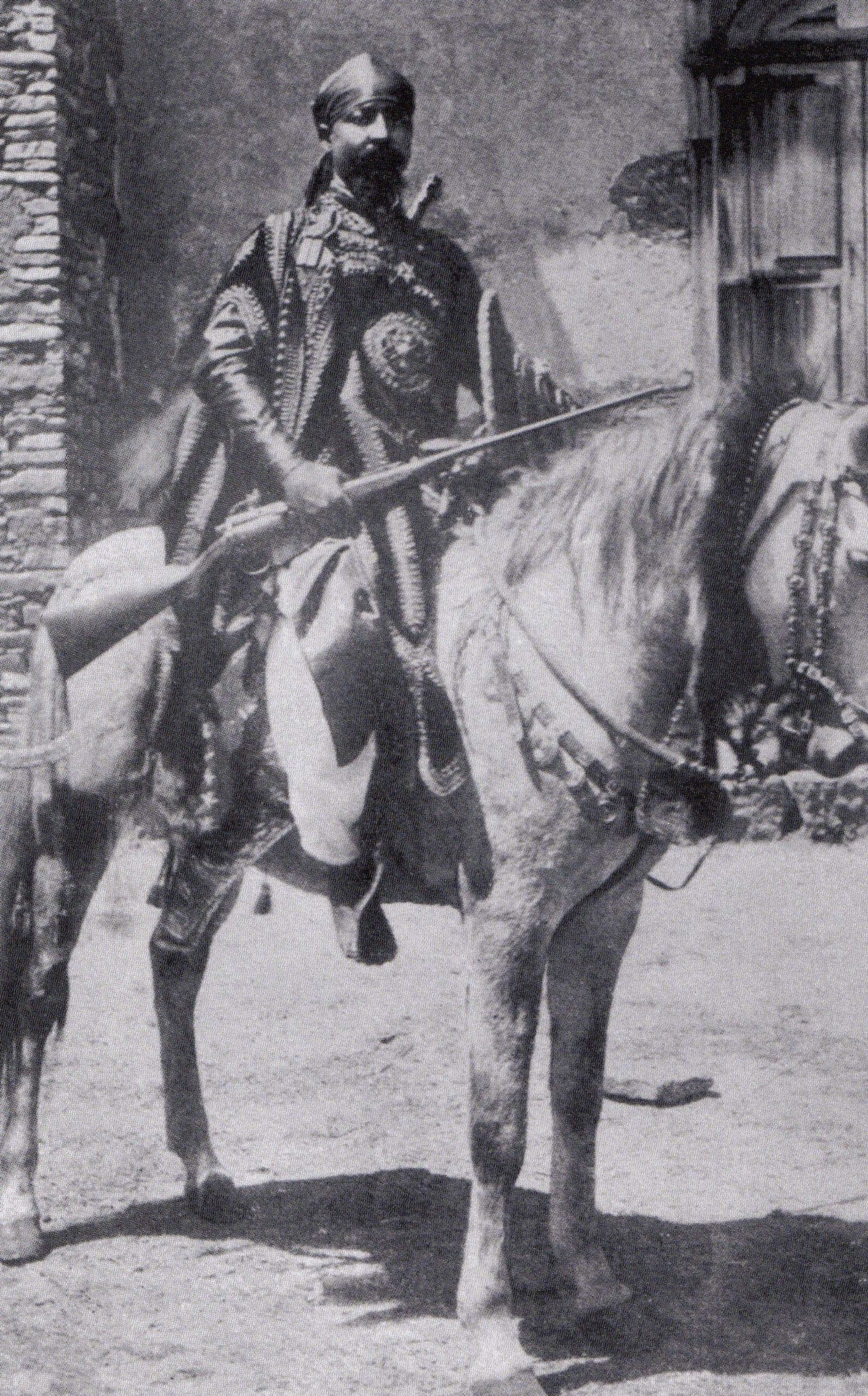
The Ethiopian military leader Ras Mengesha Yohannes on horseback

The Horn of Africa faces the Red Sea, the Arabian Sea and the Indian Ocean. As such, it has long had interactions with areas in Western Asia, particularly in the Arabian Peninsula, the Near East, and even as far east as the Indian subcontinent. Its coastal plain is hemmed in by mountain ranges which make the movement of large armies difficult and cumbersome and favor local forces that resist.

Countries and areas with ancient histories, such as Ethiopia and Somalia, all have had eras of great empires. Various ancient empires extended and consolidated their power over large parts of the Horn region, such as the Axumite Empire (4th century BC–AD 10th century), the Zagwe dynasty (10th century – 1270), the Solomonic dynasty (1270–1974), the Adal Sultanate and the Ajuran Sultanate.and hiraab imamate.

Somalia's many Sultanates each maintained regular troops, In which during Wartime these troops would be able to increase in number. Around the start of the 20th century, the Majeerteen Sultanate, Sultanate of Hobyo, Warsangali Sultanate and Dervish State employed cavalry in their battles against the European powers during the Campaign of the Sultanates.

Ethiopian soldiers decisively defeated the Italians at the Battle of Adwa, during the First Italo–Ethiopian War from 1889 to 1896. Italy was victorious against Ethiopia during the Second Italo-Abyssinian War fought from 1935 to 1936, and the country was annexed in Italian East Africa alongside the Italian colonies of Eritrea and Somalia. In the 20th century, the Italians waged the East African Campaign of World War II; however, the Italian commander, Amedeo, Duke of Aosta, was forced to surrender in 1941. Both Germany and Italy were defeated by the forces of Great Britain and its allies, and Italian East Africa was placed under British military administration.

In the later part of the 20th century, several wars were waged in the region, including the Ethiopian Civil War (1974–1991), the Ogaden War (1977–1978), the Eritrean War of Independence (1961–1991), and the Eritrean-Ethiopian War (1998–2000). During its socialist period, Somalia had the largest military on the continent on account of its friendship with the Soviet Union and later partnership with the United States. The subsequent outbreak of the Somali Civil War in 1991 led to the disbandment of the Somali National Army (SNA). However, the armed forces were later gradually reconstituted with the establishment of the Transitional Federal Government (TFG) in 2004.

=== Military history of East Africa ===
In 1885, Germany established its German East Africa colony in Tanganyika. The Germans fought doggedly to maintain their colony during the East African Campaign of World War I. The German commander, Paul Emil von Lettow-Vorbeck managed to elude capture for over five years.

In the 20th century, a number of groups engaged in guerrilla warfare in their fight to gain independence from the colonial powers, such as the Maji Maji Rebellion (1905–1907) against the Germans in Tanganyika (later Tanzania), and the Mau Mau Uprising (1952–1960) against the British in Kenya.

Recent East African conflicts have included the Burundi Civil War (1993–2005), the 1998 embassy bombings, the Rwandan Civil War (1994), and the Darfur conflict (2003–2020). The Ugandan Civil War, among other local conflicts, continue.

=== Military history of Central Africa ===
See: Central Africa. Central Africa, at times also called Middle Africa, is almost entirely landlocked; it lies astride the equator with heavy rainforest jungles and is rich in minerals and natural products. In ancient times there had been a Kingdom of Kongo which confronted invasions from explorers and settlers from Portugal starting in the 15th century.

The harsh colonial era of the Belgian Congo (1908–1960) gave way to the Congo Crisis (1960–1965) that brought in UN peacekeepers, particularly after the mineral-rich Katanga Province failed to secede in 1960, even though it had the support of Belgian business interests and over 6000 Belgian troops.

Subsequent conflicts in the Congo were the First Congo War (1996–1997) to oust President Mobutu, Second Congo War (1998–2003) between various factions with the intervention of many other African countries, making this an African regional civil war, and the ongoing Ituri Conflict.

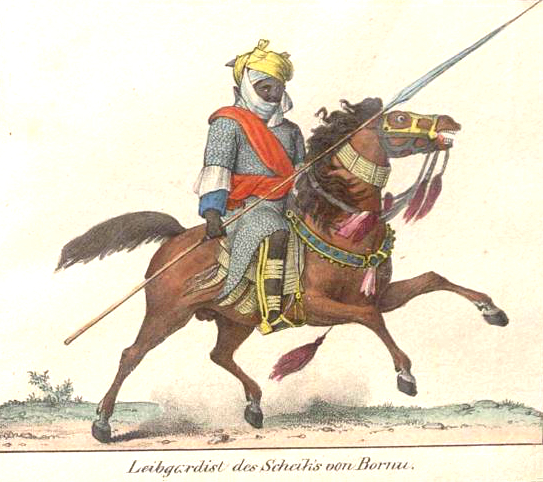
Bodyguard of the Shehu of Bornu, c. 1820

The Kanem-Bornu Empire (9th century–19th century) of ancient Chad stretched to parts of modern southern Libya, eastern Niger, northeastern Nigeria, and northern Cameroon until it was overwhelmed by attacks and wars from the Fula people, Baggara, Kanembu people, the Ouaddai Kingdom and the Sokoto Caliphate. Bornu managed to endure the instability prevailing in the region throughout the 19th century. Muhammad al-Amin al-Kanemi and his descendants helped the Mais of Bornu to successfully defend the empire against many assaults. It transformed into a Sheikhdom after the influence of al-Kanemi, and by extension his descendants, outgrew the Mais'. However, the Sudanese warlord Rabih az-Zubayr eventually conquered Bornu at the end of the 19th-century, expelling al-Kanemi's descendants. In 1900, Shehu Sanda Kura recaptured the Sheikhdom after the Battle of Kousséri, with assistance from French forces. The French forces aiding the Shehu's victory at Kousséri aided them in increasing their influence in Bornu and its eventual colonisation by the French, alongside British and German colonial powers.

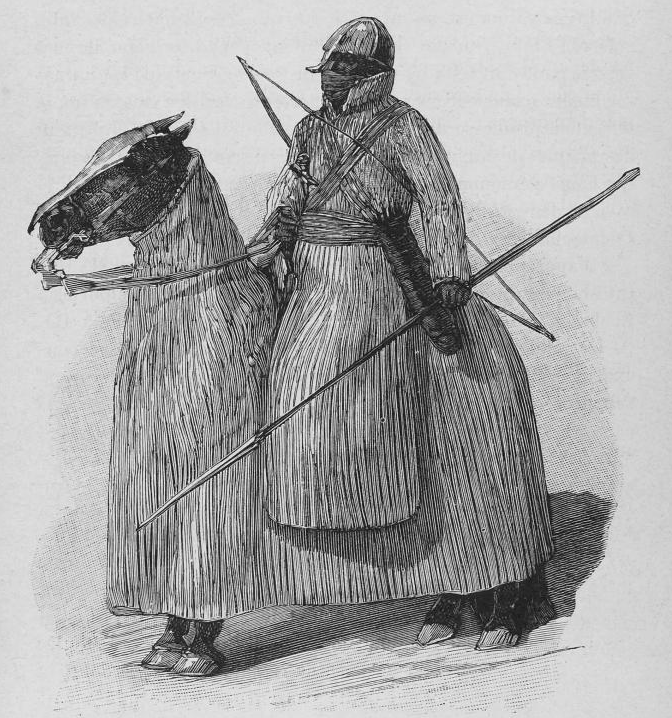
A 19th-century cavalryman from Adamawa, a Sokoto Caliphate vassal emirate located in modern northern regions of Nigeria and Cameroon

The Arabs and Islamic powers have had an historical impact, as in the history of the Central African Republic, the trans-Saharan slave trade was forcibly imposed upon the people of Central Africa.

The colonial powers, particularly Belgium and France, were dominant during the 18th and 19th centuries.

There have been a number of civil wars and genocides in Central Africa that are also close to East Africa, such as the Burundi genocide and the Rwandan genocide (1994). Some of the most notorious military dictators were Bokassa I of Central Africa (1921–1996) and Mobutu Sese Seko (1930–1997) of Zaire.

=== Military history of Western Africa ===
See West Africa, History of West Africa.

West Africa has known many ancient empires that flourished in ancient times and were involved in wars of both conquest and defeat. The Ghana Empire (750–1036), Songhai Empire (16th century–17th century), Mali Empire (1235–1546), the Bambara Empire (1652–1861), Toucouleur (19th century), Sokoto Caliphate (such as the Jihad of Usman dan Fodio (1804–1810)), Kénédougou Kingdom (c. 1650–1898), Massina Empire (19th century) rose and fell as they fought wars and won or were defeated.

During the colonial era, the powers of Europe sought to carve new colonies for themselves. This was made possible geographically because West Africa's coast is on the Atlantic Ocean, making it both open to cultural and trade influences, as well as to conquest by sea. West Africa is rich in many precious metals, minerals and products, which invites the interest and competition of outside powers and influences. There were some bloody conflicts in the 20th century when some of these nations fought against the colonial powers, such as during the Guinea-Bissau War of Independence (1963–1974).

A depiction of a horseman from the Hausa state of Kano wearing lifidi (cotton-padded armour)

During the centuries, several African countries experienced bitter civil wars, the bloodiest of which was the Nigerian Civil War (1967–1970) when Biafra sought to break away from Nigeria. Other countries have had either civil wars, internal military strife, and military coup d'états such as the Sierra Leone Civil War (1991–2002), First Liberian Civil War (1989–1996), Guinea-Bissau Civil War (1998–1999). Recent wars have been the Civil war in Côte d'Ivoire (2002–2004), and the Casamance Conflict (1990–present).

=== Military history of Southern Africa ===
Southern Africa, like the other main regions of Africa, is a complex region. It has numerous land-locked countries, but it is most notable in that it is surrounded by both the Atlantic Ocean to the west and the Indian Ocean to the east.

It is in this context that the position of the Cape of Good Hope, South Africa, and Southern Africa as a whole should be appreciated, because in the Southern Hemisphere, only South Africa, the southern end of South America, and Australia have this key strategic position.

In addition, from Europe — and also from the east coasts of the United States and South America (Brazil, Argentina), the route around South Africa's Cape is the shortest to Asia.

The Suez Canal did not exist for most of history. It was only completed in 1869, so that all shipping back and forth from Europe to Asia, Arabia, and to most of Africa had and has to be done by the long routes across the seas around South Africa's Cape.

Even after the Suez Canal's completion and modernization, it cannot accommodate larger vessels including many warships, tankers, and cargo vessels. Thus the Cape of Good Hope route remains an important route for free shipping when some of the world's other global choke points are closed off or in a state of war.

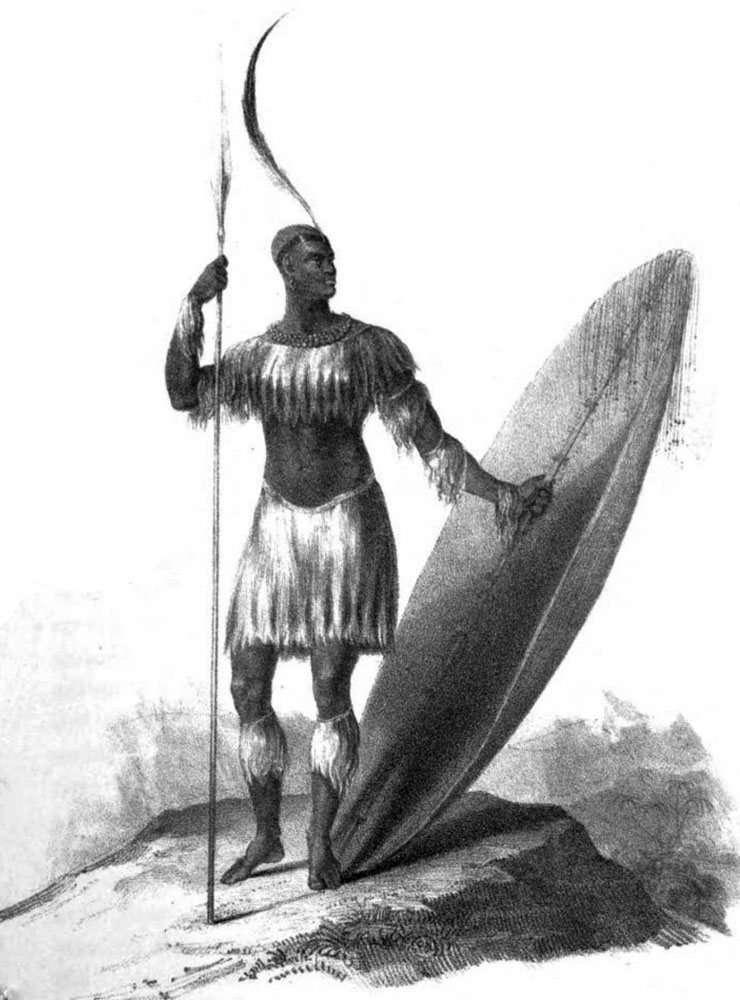
A sketch of the Zulu leader King Shaka (1781–1828) from 1824

Wealthy nations are usually great maritime naval powers, and the use of navies is tied in with protecting those nations' trade and their military strength, both of which result in geostrategic strength. Essentially, the power that has the mightiest navy and prevails on the high seas becomes the world's greatest power, which is something nations have known for a long time, hence their commercial and naval rivalry on the high seas.

In the UN scheme of geographic regions, five countries constitute Southern Africa. The most powerful is South Africa, while the others are the small countries of Botswana, Lesotho, Namibia and Swaziland. The region is often reckoned to include Angola (often also included in Central Africa); Mozambique and Madagascar (also included in East Africa); Malawi; Zambia; and Zimbabwe — as well as Comoros, Mauritius, Seychelles, Mayotte, and Réunion, which are small islands in the Indian Ocean.

The Republique Democratique du Congo and Tanzania, though more commonly reckoned in Central and Eastern Africa respectively, are occasionally included in Southern Africa. This commonality between these countries has had a great influence on their military history.

The most notable wars and conflicts in Southern Africa were those between the colonial powers of Europe who fought to dominate and control the African people of Southern Africa as well as the wars between the British and the white Boers, also known as Afrikaners, who were mostly the descendants of earlier colonists introduced by the Dutch East India Company.

The Dutch fought the Khoikhoi-Dutch Wars (1659–1677) in the area of present-day Cape Town, South Africa. Anglo-Dutch wars followed, with battles at Battle of Muizenberg (1795) and the Battle of Blaauwberg (1806) that established British power in South Africa permanently.

During the Great Trek Dutch farmers, or trekboers, migrated inland from the southern coast and confronted the Xhosa in a series of Xhosa Wars (1779–1879) that resulted in the final defeat of the Xhosa.

There was also an inter-African conflict during the Ndwandwe-Zulu War (1817–1819) and the Mfecane (185–1835) with the triumph of the Zulu. The Boers and Zulus confronted each other at the Battle of Italeni (1838) and the Battle of Blood River (1838), resulting in the defeat of the Zulu, although the Zulu state continued to survive until the conclusion of the Anglo-Zulu War (1879).

The British fought and were defeated by the Boers during the Boer republics during the First Boer War (1880–1881) but won the Second Boer War (1899–1902). Largely under British influence, an autonomous Union of South Africa developed into a strong white-ruled nation. During World War I, the Union formed a South African Overseas Expeditionary Force to fight for the Allies. Thousands of South African servicemen died at Delville Wood, (Battle of the Somme (1916)) and at Passchendaele (1917). Former Boer leader Jan Smuts distinguished himself by leading successful campaigns in German East Africa (Tanzania) and German South-West Africa (today Namibia).

South Africa also contributed heavily to the Allied war effort during World War II, funneling arms and troops into the North African and Italian campaigns. A number of South African volunteers also became aces in the Royal Air Force.

- The South African Army and Air Force were instrumental in defeating Italian forces that had invaded Ethiopia in 1935.
- Another important victory that the South Africans participated in was the liberation of Malagasy (now known as Madagascar) from the control of Vichy France. British troops aided by South African soldiers staged their attack from South Africa and occupied the strategic island in 1942 to preclude its seizure by the Japanese.
- The South African 1st Infantry Division took part in several actions in North Africa in 1941 and 1942, including the Battle of El Alamein, before being withdrawn to South Africa.
- The South African 2nd Infantry Division also took part in a number of actions in North Africa during 1942, but on 21 June 1942 two complete infantry brigades of the division, as well as most of the supporting units, were captured at the fall of Tobruk.
- The South African 3rd Infantry Division never took an active part in any battles, but instead organised and trained the South African home defence forces, performed garrison duties, and supplied replacements for the South African 1st Infantry Division and the South African 2nd Infantry Division. However, one of this division's constituent brigades, 7 SA Motorised Brigade, did take part in the invasion of Malagasy.
- The South African 6th Armoured Division, which incorporated many Southern Rhodesian volunteers, fought in numerous actions in Italy from 1944 to 1945.
- South Africa contributed to the war effort against Japan, supplying men and manning ships in naval engagements against the Japanese.

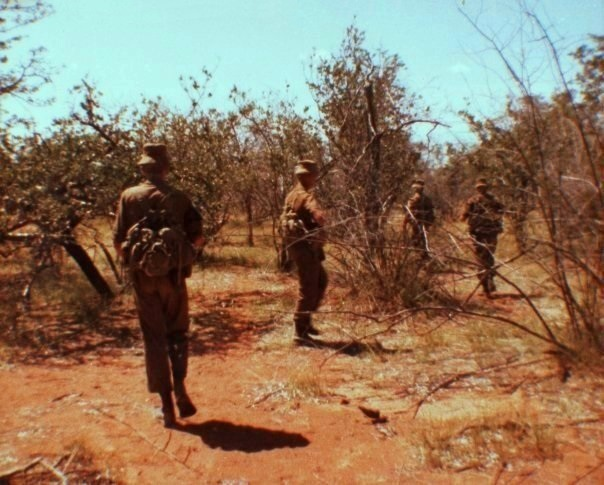
South African paratroops in Angola

Altogether, 334,000 men volunteered for full-time service in the South African Army during WWII, including some 211,000 whites, 77,000 blacks and 46,000 "coloureds" and Asians), with nearly 9,000 killed in action.

Modern conflicts involving South Africa's predominantly Afrikaner government raged as a result of its controversial apartheid policy, led by Umkhonto we Sizwe, military wing of the African National Congress, and the Azanian People's Liberation Army, which received training and armament from communist states such as the Soviet Union and the People's Republic of China. The related South African Border War broke out when the South West African People's Organization (SWAPO) began its struggle to free Namibia from South African rule. South Africa fought a long and bitter campaign against SWAPO and its Angolan allies from 1966 to 1989. The conflict escalated into major conventional warfare in 1984; between 1987 and 1988 South African, Cuban, and Angolan armies fought the Battle of Cuito Cuanavale: Africa's largest single engagement since World War II.

An Angolan War of Independence (1961–1974), part of a broader Portuguese Colonial War in Africa, was followed by the Angolan Civil War (1974–2002). Similarly, the Mozambican War of Independence (1964–1974) was followed by the Mozambican Civil War (1975–1992). The Rhodesian Bush War (1966–1979) saw the conservative white minority government in Rhodesia (Zimbabwe) toppled by nationalist guerrillas.

The South African Defence Force built nuclear weapons and is alleged to have tested one off its coast (facing the South Pole near Antarctica) as part of what has become known as the Vela incident. As of 2014, no other African country has obtained nuclear weapons of any description.

== See also ==
- List of conflicts in Africa
- List of African Union military interventions
- African theatre of World War I
- African military systems to 1800
- African military systems (1800–1900)
