= African military systems (1800–1900) =

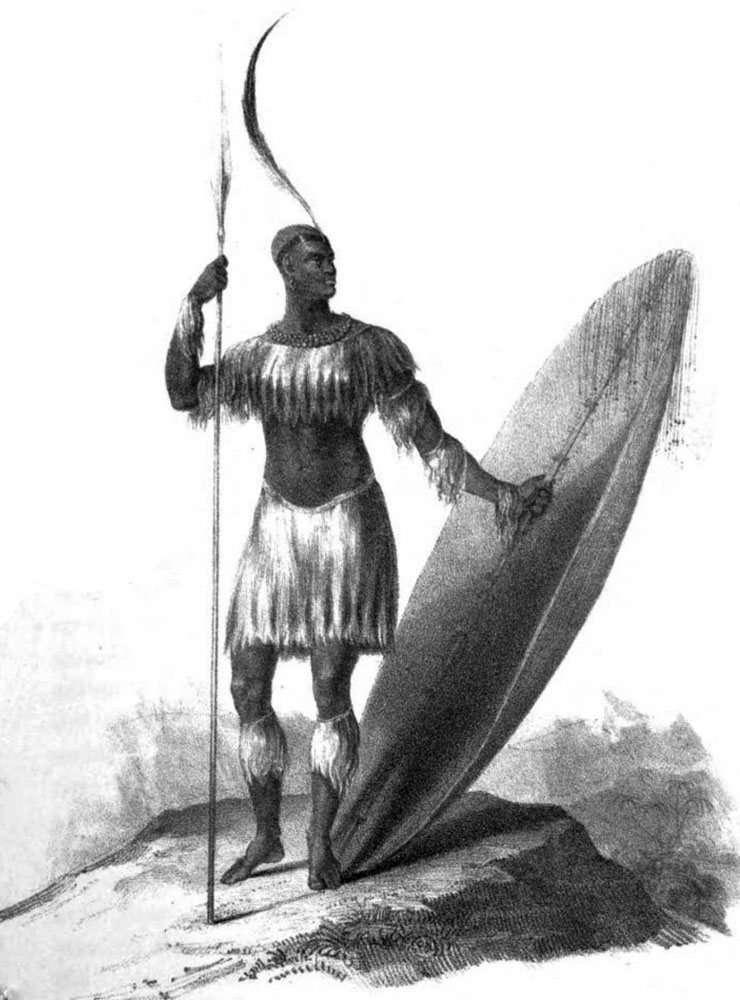
Developments after 1800 were to result in significant development to African military systems. Guns assumed a more dominant place on the battlefield, but the military system of the Zulu eschewed the gun in favor of the motivated spearman. Both approaches were to have important effects.

African military systems (1800–1900) refers to the evolution of military systems on the African continent after 1800, with emphasis on the role of indigenous states and peoples within the African continent. Only major military systems or innovations and their development after 1800 are covered here. For events prior to 1800, see African military systems to 1800. Coverage of the late 19th/20th century and beyond is provided in African military systems after 1900. For an overall view of the military history of Africa by region, see Military History of Africa. See individual battles, empires and leaders for details on activities after 1800.

== African military systems and the 19th century ==
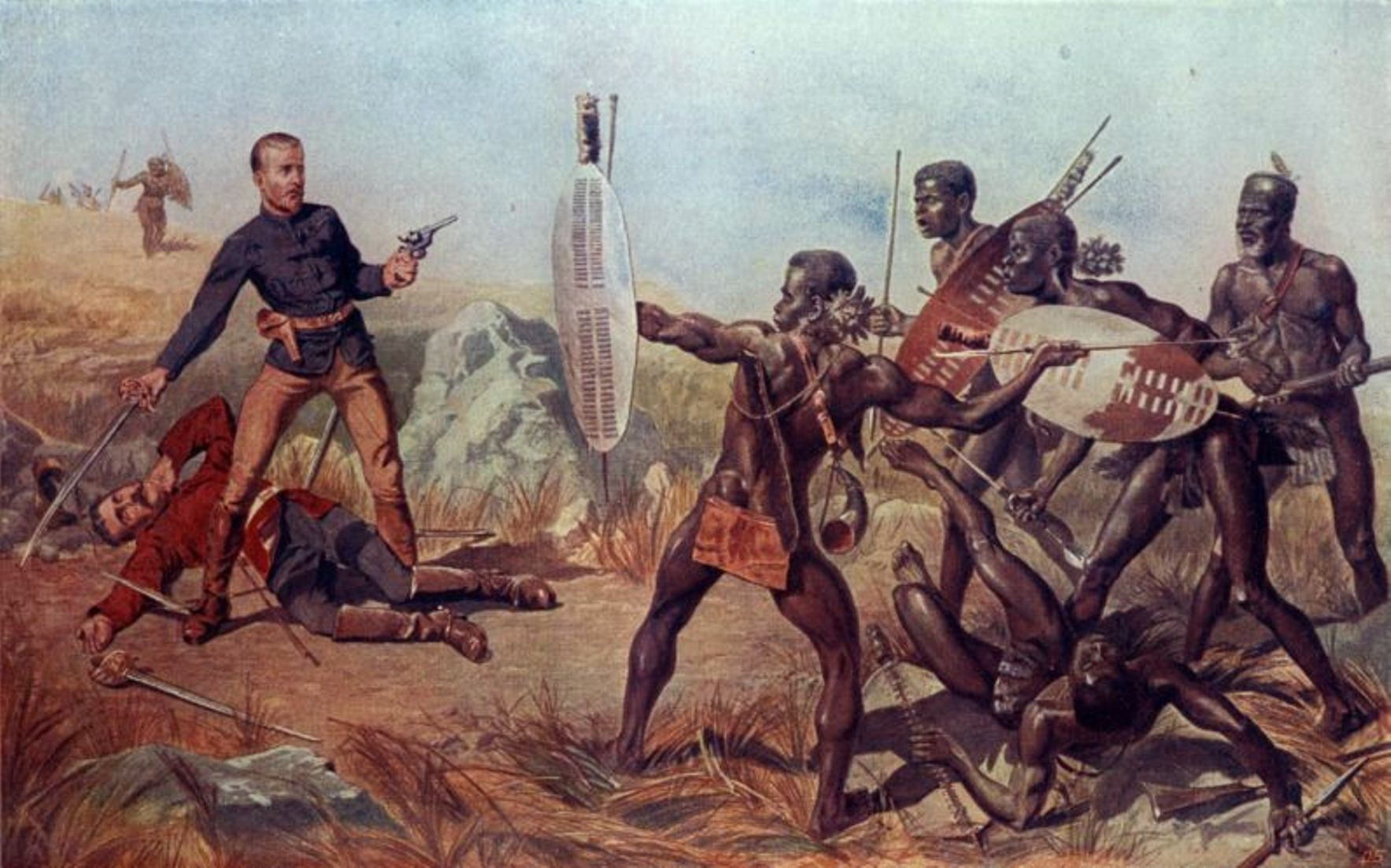
Painting by C. E. Fripp, depicting Lieutenants Melvill and Coghill in battle with Zulu soldiers at the Battle of Isandlwana.

=== Significant influences ===
The beginning of the 19th century saw several factors that had significant bearing on the evolution of military systems. Such factors are referenced in standard histories on Africa that identify the 19th century as a period of intense transformation on the continent. Some of these are:

- The rise of the Zulu kingdom under Shaka, which created significant change – from the southern part of the continent, up into East and Central Africa
- The Fula jihads of West Africa, causing substantial transformation in that region on into the belt of Sudanic states
- The increasing volume of guns delivered to the continent
- The growth of trade between Africa and other parts of the world, including the suppression and replacement of the slave trade with other commerce
- The explosion of European interest in Africa, culminating in invasions, settlement and acquisition of colonial empires in different parts of the continent

All these factors in part continued earlier trends but the 19th century was to see an acceleration in the pace of military evolution on the continent. The environmental variables of past centuries also continued in many areas. Some of these include:

- Relatively low population densities that reduced forces for combat
- Poor soils (particularly in tropical forest areas) and low crop productivity
- Disease-carrying vectors that hindered deployment of weapons systems like cavalry and weakened infantry forces in many regions
- Lack of good coastal harbors and navigable rivers – hindering large scale logistics

These variables impacted the development of military systems. Low population densities for example meant that large forces could not be raised and maintained in being for a long time. The Zulu as one instance, could field an estimated 50,000 warriors, impressive by regional standards. But this was the nation's entire armed strength, whereas more populous European nations during the Napoleonic Wars of the 19th century could routinely put this number of men into a single battle. The environment also hindered use of wheeled transport for the movement of goods in parts of Africa, particularly pre-colonial West Africa, though wheeled vehicles are depicted from ancient times at Tondia, near Goundam, south of Timbuktu in today's Mali, and possibly at Kourki south of the Niger bend in the Republic of Niger. Some scholars note that the tsetse fly belt which its debilitating effect on load-bearing draft animals, and the presence of terrain such as jungle or brush make extensive use of wheeled conveyances inefficient or impractical. One Old Calabar ruler in today's Nigeria for example imported a European style carriage but all the draft horses to pull it died. They had to be replaced with men, a pattern occurring in several areas including Dahomey where people usually had to provide the motive power. In 1845, Dahomey deployed a cart presumably wheeled, to carry a 500 feet long chain intended to secure prisoners during their campaign against Badagry, but this too may have needed human power. The problem of expense and impracticality is illustrated by the gift of a carriage to the ruler of Asante in precolonial times, which required the construction of new roads though brush or jungle terrain, including building of new bridges to cross streams, with a final obstacle: inability of the vehicle to move through narrow streets in the capital city, requiring new streets to be made. Practical and economic considerations to the use of various technologies are not unique to Africa. Scholar R.W Bulliett notes that wheeled vehicles declined and became uncommon throughout the entire Middle East early during early medieval times, as people adopted cheaper, more rational solutions in the form of pack animals such as camels.

Political fragmentation also hindered the growth of large armies, as certain African states could be divided and defeated separately by foreign invaders, just as Rome did with numerous tribal opponents in antiquity. Nevertheless, despite such limits, the internal consolidation and growth of African states played an important part in military transformation. The Zulu system for example did not rely on foreign horses, guns or ships. The evolution of African military systems is thus not a simple tale of outside influences but a complex web of indigenous development that adapted, shaped and sometimes rejected outside technology.

=== Firearms ===
The introduction of firearms was important, but guns on African battlefields were often of indifferent quality, and traditional weapons and tactics sometimes compared favorably with them. Indeed, Africans were well aware of the deficiencies of trade muskets and often demanded better quality than that offered. Most guns imported from Europe had not been test fired by the manufacturer to check for imperfections in bore and breach, although this was essential in the era of hand-forged barrels. Proven guns had proof-marks, and counterfeits flourished in the Africa trade. Firearms were thus a mixed bag on the ground, and the success of consolidating native powers like the Merina in Madagascar or the Zulu were due more to changes in indigenous organization, leadership and tactics, than to firearms. As the decades rolled on however, improvements to firearms, and other technology such as disease control (the cinchona bark to suppress malaria for example), and steamships were to give Europeans a decisive military edge on the continent.

== Naval developments ==
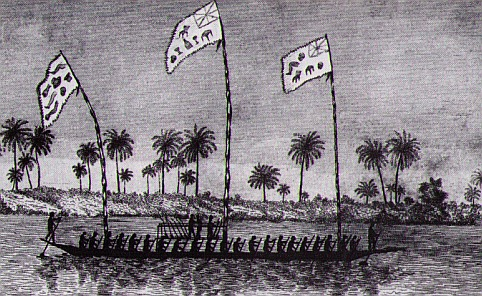
Igbo war canoe from Nigeria, circa 1830s, demonstrates a blend of indigenous and imported technology. Construction is of a single log. Steering is provided by two oars-men in bow and stern. Muskets stand ready on the fighting platform in the center, and captured enemy flags and trophies fly overhead. Swivel guns and small cannon were sometimes installed.

Naval warfare patterns showed continuity with that of the 18th century. Foreign-derived designs like dhows plied East African waters, pirates operated off the Barbary coast, and canoes also were used in ocean trading and fishing. Indigenous fighting vessels however, generally stayed inland or very close to home. Armament continued to be relatively weak, despite persistent attempts to "up-gun" war vessels. Small swivel cannon were reportedly first introduced late in the 18th century on the West Coast by one Antonio Vaz Coelho, a free Negro from Brazil. This practice accelerated in the 19th century. The city-state of Lagos for example, deployed medium-sized canoes carrying up to 25 men, armed with swivel-cannon. Soldiers on board attempted to force landings, using both muskets and swivel guns for covering fire. Naval tactics with these weapons sometimes followed a "fire and withdraw" pattern. The canoes maneuvered close inshore for firepower to be delivered, then backed out quickly to the open water to reload, before repeating the cycle.

Generally cannons were placed in the bow or stern, with the boat absorbing the guns' recoil. The whole vessel had to be turned to deliver salvoes. Compared to European use of naval cannon, such artillery saw limited use in ship to ship engagements, or shore bombardments. As stand-off weapons covering troop landings or raiding missions however, they had serviceable anti-personnel value, particularly when combined with muskets. In Nigeria, large war canoes are reported, some mounting up to twenty pairs of swivel-guns on cross-beams at intervals of five or six feet. In 1841, the ruler of Abo was reported to muster some 300 canoes, many armed with muskets and bow/stern cannons. Some canoe fleets however relied on traditional weapons. On Lake Chad in the early 19th century the piratical Buduna fielded a fleet of some 1,000 reed canoes, using spears and shields for armament, and in East Africa, native kingdoms sometimes vied for supremacy with large numbers of canoes on the region's great lakes.

Bigger war canoe tactics separated fighting men from rowing specialists, whether using muskets or traditional spears.

In the Niger Delta, the bigger Itsekiri war canoes mounted multiple cannon and swivels, and carried 40 rowers and 100 warriors, with slaves doing most of the rowing duties. Slaves were also tasked with providing food for the canoe men. Commerce sometimes operated closely with war-making. Itsekiri traders operated their own fleets of fighting vessels, and the British navy was often unable to stop these fast-moving warrior-merchants as they flitted between the streams, lagoons and waterways of the Delta. On several occasions they fended off British warships by blockading narrow creeks and waterways, and in disputes with the colonial regime or European merchants, shut down trade on the Benin river for several months. Pirates also made use of fast canoes to plague commerce and local citizenry alike. War-canoe ports were often fortified with extensive stockades, and multiple trench lines, behind which teams of gunmen and other fighters were marshalled for defense. Some European slave-traders and their allies also made use of big canoes in their operations, plying the waterways in heavy vessels backed with musketeers and armed with small cannon, as they collected their human cargo for transport to the Americas. The Ijaw people were reported to have mounted a gatling gun in a canoe during the Kalabari Civil War from 1879–1883.

Naval developments mirror those on land. New technology like firearms was adapted and shaped to existing indigenous politics, technology and forms of organization. The landscape also played its part- limiting major, long-term water movement by rivers that were unnavigable for long stretches, contrary currents, and lack of good coastal harbors. Few native powers attempted any significant upgrades involving intensive sailing technology, or took to the oceans with long-distance ships in the European, Polynesian or Chinese manner. No African equivalent of the famous, ocean-spanning Chinese fleet admiral Cheng Ho was to emerge, although a number of inland captains rose to prominence. The days of Carthage long gone, African naval power remained primarily a localized phenomenon.

== Land warfare in the 19th century ==
The post 1800 period saw a quickening of European expansion and conquest in Africa. This expansion did not go unopposed, nor was such activity the only significant military development on the continent. Indigenous states in all regions were developing new forms of political organization and military structure independently of, and before the major European interlude.

=== Cavalry and infantry in West Africa ===
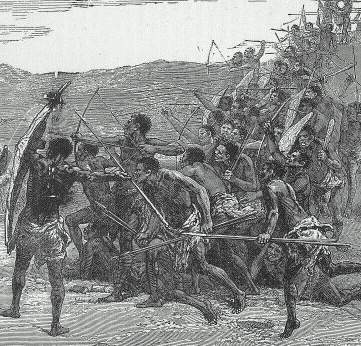
Infantry forces in many areas relied heavily on poisoned arrows, using agents that affected the heart and nerves. A rapid volume of fire was often the key to success in combat.

Traditional weapons saw substantial use well into the century, and weapons systems such as cavalry, archers, and spearmen clashed in many areas. The Mandingo horsemen of the Liberian hinterland for example were said to call out to fearful or fleeing infantry opponents with two options: "Stand and you are a slave; run and you are a corpse." Mounted troops however were far from invincible. Bowmen made up the bulk of infantry strength in many areas, and the use of poisoned arrows and a rapid volume of fire partially offset weaknesses in bow strength and unfletched arrows. Against determined combinations of archers and spearmen, properly positioned and deployed, cavalry could be beaten. Just such a scenario unfolded in 1804, when Fulani groups proclaimed a jihad against the cavalry heavy state of Gobir, in what is today's Northern Nigeria. The Fulani, under Usman Dan Fodio, a religious reformer and teacher, suffered a number of initial setbacks against the fast-moving Gobir cavalry, most notably at the Battle of Tsuntua where some 2,000 men were lost.

==== Fulani infantry tactics ====
The cavalrymen of Gobir, under their leader Yunfa, initially mocked the inability of the Fulani to use horses effectively, but the Fulani replied with their own trump card, massed arrow fire, at the Battle of Tabkin Kwotto. Ordinarily, such fire would have been delivered by scattered bowmen in loose formation, vulnerable to quick charges by the Gobir chevaliers. In this particular battle however, the Fulani anchored their formation in a fairly wooded area, with one flank of their army resting on a lake. Although the cavalry of Gobir outflanked their opponents, the center of the Fulani formation held this strong position. Rather than deploy in the usual open skirmishing order, the Fulani bowmen adopted a square, grouping their archers in a compact block, and concentrating the firepower of their poisoned arrows. This broke the back of the Gobir formations, despite their armor.

The tactics of the Fulani were continually refined over time, as they gained more victories and themselves began to acquire numbers of horses for their own cavalry arm. Dan Fodio wrote on tactics employed by his forces as the jihad campaign unfolded: The infantry armed themselves with large shields (diraq) and carried long lances and javelin. Grouped into ranks, a spearman knelt on the left knee, holding his round shield before him. Behind the ranks of spearmen the archers stood ready. They were ordered to shoot at the enemy horse and men in chain mail (duru). As the enemy cavalry approached the infantry would launch its javelins and the archers would keep shooting. If the enemy wavered, the infantry formation would then part left and right, so that their own cavalry was unleashed in pursuit. The writings of Dan Fodio on tactics echo a sentiment that would be approved by many a military commander: "Concentration is the first thing in victory: the beginning of defeat is dispersion."

==== Cavalry-infantry combination ====
Cavalry still continued to be relevant in the 19th century. The Caliphate of Sokoto, was West Africa's largest single state during this period, and had its genesis in the many Muslim jihads across the region. Sokoto's core strike force was cavalry, although the bulk of its armies consisted of archers and spearmen. On the flat terrain of the savannahs, this combination did relatively well against indigenous opponents, although deployment in forested regions, and operations against fortifications suffered from the problems of earlier eras. Infantry, and their muskets, became increasing more important and dominant in some savannah areas as the decades progressed. Sokoto and several other cavalry-elite empires like Gobir however, continued to place their trust in the traditional weapons and fighting styles. This "old ways" approach of Sokoto can be seen in such battles as the 1826 clash with the state of Gobir, where some elite units of armored Sokoto cavalry had to be lifted onto their horses, like the medieval knights of Europe. The main Sokoto striking force was the cavalry, usually made up of the most privileged classes or individuals. Most horsemen served in the light cavalry, which engaged in direct combat in addition to raiding, reconnaissance, and pursuit duties. Their weaponry was throwing javelins, swords, lances and shields. Heavy cavalry, usually with chain mail, strong quilted armor and shields formed a smaller, but important strike force of the cavalry component. Along with swords or battle-axes, they were usually armed with a heavy lance with which to run down and close with the enemy. Cavalry lances were usually tipped with poison. Infantry forces relied heavily on the bow and poisoned arrow, but also included long spears for fending off cavalry and side-arms such as swords and battle-axes. Smaller divisions of spearmen and swordsmen rounded out the Sokoto infantry formations. The cavalry-elites depended heavily for their successes on cooperation with lesser esteemed infantry, who were critical in opening opportunities for attack, fixing an enemy into an unfavorable position, or in suppressing deadly counterfire by poisoned arrows. This conservatism in methods was to continue on into the 20th century, when the Sokoto hosts clashed with the modern weaponry of the British Empire.

=== The Ashanti military system ===
==== Organization, equipment and tactics ====
===== Mobilization, recruitment and logistics =====
From about 1700 to 1820, no nation on the Gold Coast of West Africa (region of modern-day Ghana) excelled the Ashanti in the scale of their military organization and activity. Wars of conquest made them the major power in the area, and they fought and won several major clashes against the British, before going down to defeat in the latter part of the 19th century. A small core of professional warriors was supplemented by peasant levies, volunteers and contingents from allied or tributary states. Grouped together under competent commanders such as Osei Tutu and Opoku Ware, such hosts began to expand the Ashanti empire in the 18th century on into the 19th, moving from deep inland to the edges of the Atlantic. One British source in 1820 estimated that the Ashanti could field a potential 80,000 troops, and of these, 40,000 could in theory, be outfitted with muskets or blunder-busses.

===== Arms and equipment =====
The Ashanti became familiar with firearms in the 18th century, and by the 19th century, the bulk of their best troops were armed with a variety of guns, such as the standard European trade muskets, 6 feet in length, so-called "Long Dane". The Long Dane, and other improved Africa-trade models that came into service over the years, were serviceable weapons in local context, but obsolete compared to first-rank European firearms. This was to cause problems against strong British forces in later wars. General Nkwanta, head of the Ashanti army's general council is reported to have done a detailed assessment of new breech-loading European firearms in 1872–73 and was troubled by the obsolescence of Ashanti muskets in comparison. Some of the muskets burst after a few firings, and good quality powder and shot were in short supply. Most of the gunmen in addition, did not use wadding to compact the powder down into the barrels but simply dumped in it, then added a variety of lead slugs, nails, bits of metal or even stones. This made an impressive pyrotechnic display, but unless opponents were at very close range, the muskets were ineffective. The huge explosion and kick of the muskets also meant that men preferred to fire from the hip, causing them to aim high, with inaccurate results.

Available guns were valued however, and carefully protected with leather or leopard skin covers, as were the pouches of ammunition each fighter carried. Soldiers carried thirty to forty gunpowder charges within reach, individually packed in small wooden boxes for quick reloading. Good bullets were scarce, and gunners were forced to use such substitutes as stones, metal pieces, and bits of lead. Compared to the European enemies they were to face in their later history, the weapons of the Ashanti were poor. The Ashanti fighting man also wore a buckskin belt, carrying several knives of various lengths. The belt also held a machete for cutting through bush, or hand-to-hand combat.

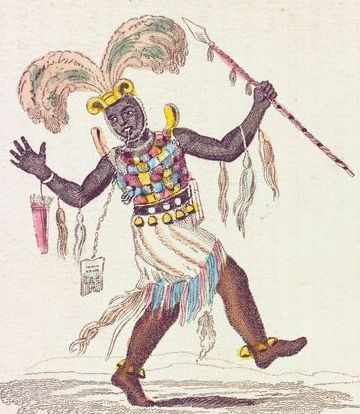
Ceremonial Ashanti sword bearer

===== Organization of the Ashanti armies =====
The Ashanti national army was elaborately organized into six parts, each with various sub-divisions, and muskets gradually replaced bows and arrows as the main weapons. Such organization was based primarily on structures already in place locally, rather than being copies of European forms, and can be seen in the history of Akwamu, one of the earliest of all the centralized Akan forest kingdoms. Guns were added to and adapted to this six part breakdown as follows:

- Scouts (akwansrafo),
- Advance guard (twafo)
- Main body (adonten),
- Personal bodyguard (gyase)
- Rear- guard (kyidom)
- Two wings-left (benkum) and right (nifa). Each wing having two formations: right and right-half (nifa nnaase), left and left-half (benkum nnaase)

On the move the army used this general breakdown- advance guard, main body, rearguard, and right and left wings. This detailed organization had several advantages, enabling the Ashanti generals to maneuver their forces with flexibility. The scouts performed recon and carried out pursuit operations. The advance guard could serve as initial storm troops or bait troops- getting an enemy to reveal his position and strength. The main body applied the bulk of the army's striking power. The personal bodyguard protected the king or high ranking nobles or generals in the field. The rear guard might function for pursuit, or as a reserve echelon. The two wings might attempt to carry out encirclement of the opposing force, or even strike at the rear.

Individualized acts of daring were encouraged, such as rushing out into the open to chop off the heads of wounded or dead enemies. A tally of these trophies was presented to the commanding general after the end of the engagement. Severe discipline prevailed in the Ashanti armies. Soldiers who faltered were whipped or slashed with heavy swords carried by special contingents of "enforcer" troops – the "sword-bearers". Ashanti soldiers had to memorize the following saying: "If I go forward, I die; if I flee, I die. Better to go forward and die in the mouth of battle." Generally the "enforcers" were deployed forward, between the scouts and the main force. They eased back as the battle started to better observe and intimidate the weary and faltering. In a feature seldom seen among armies at that point in history, the Ashanti also deployed units of medical personnel behind the main forces, who were tasked with caring for the wounded and removing the dead.

===== Ashanti tactics =====
The flexibility of the Ashanti tactical system called for a large measure of decentralization, important in the thick forest terrain of Western Africa. This heavy jungle growth often hindered large scale clashes in the open involving thousands of men, as was seen among peoples like the Zulu or the Ndebele. Ashanti methods thus involved smaller tactical sub-units, ambushes, constant movement, and more dispersed strikes and counter-strikes. In one unusual incident in 1741 however, the armies of Asante and Akkem agreed to "schedule" a battle, and jointly assigned some 10,000 men to cut down trees to make space for a full scale clash. The Asante won this encounter.

One 1844 British commentary on Ashanti tactics claims that they commenced operations by cutting a number of footpaths in the brush to approach and encircle the enemy force. Once reaching the initial jump-off point, Ashanti troops formed in line and attacked. Other accounts compared the Ashanti marching order to that of ants, with the use of several parallel columns that joined into one general striking force maneuvering before combat. Such a "converging columns" approach was ironically used by the British themselves in fighting the Ashanti, and is a tactic that appeared on the battlefields of Europe under Napoleon, as 'march divided, fight together' was the original raison d'etre of the division. These standardized tactics had often yielded the Ashanti victory. Scouts screened the army as it marched in its columns, then withdrew as the enemy became close. Upon the beginning of combat, the advance guard moved up in 2 or 3 lines, discharged its muskets and paused to reload. The second line would then advance to fire and reload, A third rear line would then repeat the advance – fire-reload cycle. This "rolling fire" tactic was repeated until the advance halted. Flanking units would be dispatched as part of the fire and maneuver model.

==== The Ashanti versus the British ====
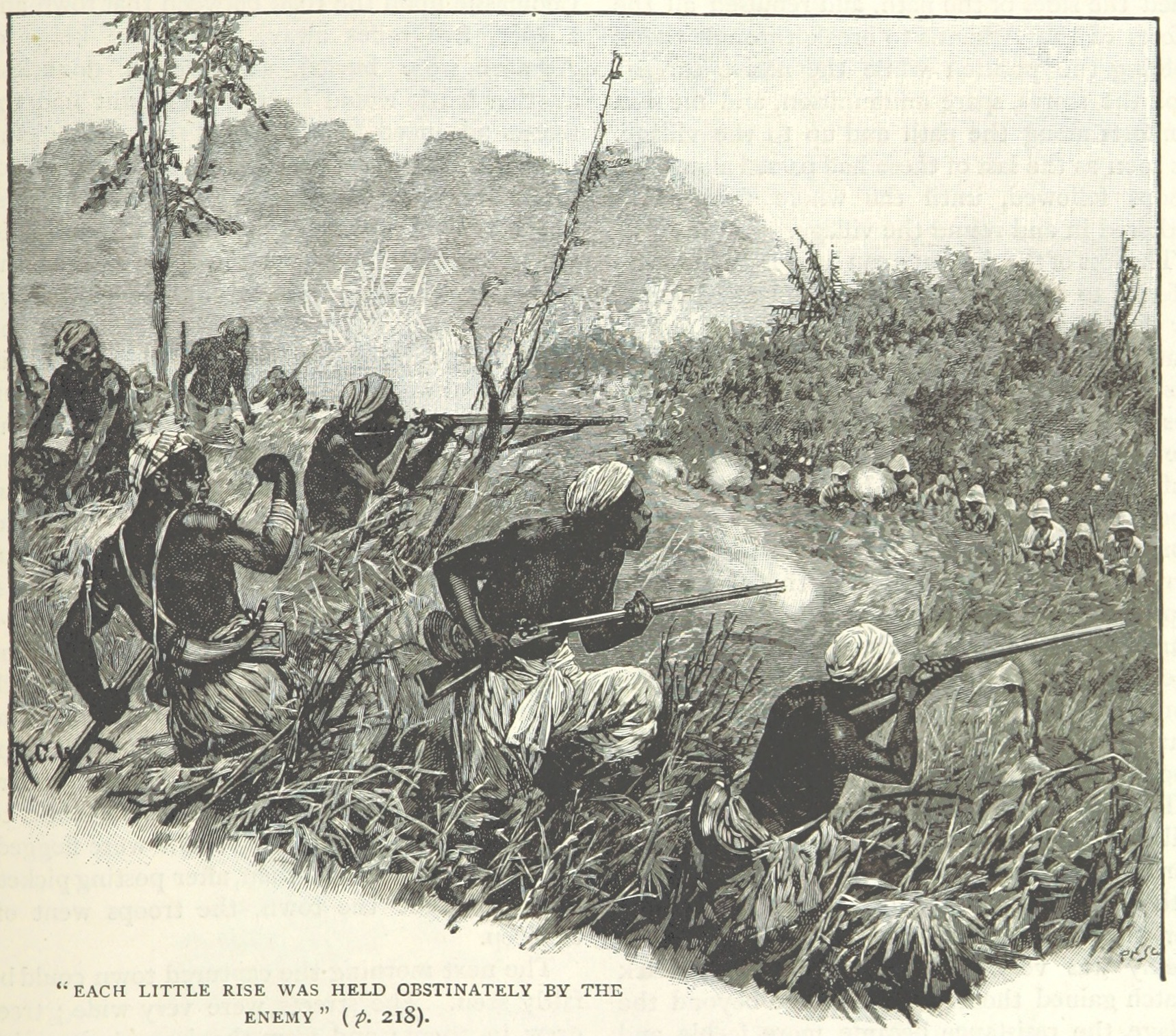
Scene from Third Anglo-Ashanti War 1874

In facing the British, the Ashanti did not change their traditional tactics appreciably. They had initially advanced across the Prah River in a regional campaign before being confronted by a British invasion force. Beset by severe logistics problems, smallpox and dysentery they had pulled back across the river. Nevertheless, their battle plan was one that had worked earlier. The Ashanti sought to draw the British deep into their territory, against a strong defensive anvil centered at the town of Amoaful. Here the British would be tied down, while maneuvering wing elements circled to the rear, trapping and cutting them off. Some historians (Farwell 2001) note that this was "hammer and anvil" approach was a traditional Ashanti battle strategy, and was common in other African armies as well. It had served the Ashanti well against other African forces, and had beaten the British under Governor Charles McCarthy of Sierra Leone once before. In 1824 M'Carthy had advanced with a small force of African and colonial militia, and encountered 10,000 Ashanti at the village of Essamako. Perhaps hoping to sustain internal morale and/or overawe the opposing natives, McCarthy ordered the band of the Royal African Corps to play "God Save The King". The Ashanti moved up drums and horns and in turn struck up their own music, before launching an encircling attack. The British were quickly routed and M'Carthy was captured and beheaded, with his skull later serving as a drinking cup.

At the village of Amoaful, the Ashantis succeeded in luring their opponents forward according to plan, and threatened them several times by flanking movements. Ashanti weaponry however, was poor compared to the modern weapons deployed by the redcoats, a point noted in the British accounts, and such superior arms served the British well in repulsing the Ashanti encirclements: "The Ashantees stood admirably, and kept up one of the heaviest fires I ever was under. While opposing our attack with immediately superior numbers, they kept enveloping our left with a constant series of well-directed flank attacks." Enemy commander General Garnet Wolesey had anticipated Ashanti tactics and had strengthened the British flanks with the best units and stronger firepower. The earlier successes of the African kingdom were thus not repeated.

Another tactic of the Ashanti during later wars against the British was to create powerful log stockades at key points to block British advances. Some of these fortifications were over a hundred yard long, with heavy parallel tree trunks sometimes impervious to destruction by artillery fire. Behind these stockades numerous warriors were mobilized to check enemy movement. While formidable in construction, many of these strongpoints failed because Ashanti guns, gunpowder and bullets were poor, and provided little sustained killing power in defense. Time and time again British troops overcame or bypassed the stockades by mounting old-fashioned bayonet charges, after laying down some covering fire. The Ashanti had given up effective use of melee weapons like spears, and had little effective reply to the cold steel of an infantry charge except the weak volleys of their obsolete or malfunctioning muskets. Supplementary weapons like bush knives made an indifferent showing in these tactical situations against the European soldiers. The presence of African enemies also fighting alongside the British with their customary arms also added to Ashanti woes. Supposed advanced technology in this case, the gun, became ironically, a handicap for the indigenous forces. By contrast, the Zulu retained the effective use of their traditional spears, generally forcing the British to remain in packed defensive formations or entrenched strongpoints, protected by guns and artillery.

==== Effectiveness of the Ashanti ====
Some British commentary draws a sharp contrast between Ashanti fighting qualities and the shakiness and unreliability of the coastal kingdoms, ostensible allies of the British. At Amoaful, one combat post-mortem pays tribute to the Ashanti commander: "The great Chief Amanquatia was among the killed. Admirable skill was shown in the position selected by Amanquatia, and the determination and generalship he displayed in the defence fully bore out his great reputation as an able tactician and gallant soldier."

While the numbers fielded and weaponry compared unfavorably to the mass armies and industrial output of contemporary Europe, the Ashanti were a strong regional power, that did relatively well until confronted by the most advanced technology of a major world power in the latter half of the 19th century. As one Western historian observes:

"From 1807 to 1900, Asante armies fought numerous small and large battles against the British. In several of these they were the clear victors, the only West African army to defeat a European army in more than one engagement."

=== Resistance to colonial expansion: Samori and Emir Abdelkader ===
The policies of Samori Ture of Mali and Guinea and Emir Abdelkader of Algeria illustrate how African states were expanding internally, while fighting foreign invasions. Both adapted to modern arms in performing these tasks.

==== Abd-el Kader in Algeria ====
Mobile French columns armed with modern artillery and rifles pursued a ruthless "scorched earth" policy to crush native resistance. By 1844, one third of the French Army, some 108,000 men were tied down in Algerian fighting.

Unlike many parts of the continent, the operations of Emir Abdelkader in Algeria represent a different pattern of warfare in opposition to colonial rule. While small scale raids, skirmishes and revolts always existed, the Algerian anti-French war of the 19th century persisted for decades as a major conflict, with indigenous armies using modern arms to prosecute it. The French conquest of Algeria began in 1834 with the seizure of Algiers, ousting the Ottoman regime. The tribes of the region rose in revolt and a brutal war ensued. In 1832, a new leader of the native forces gained prominence, the Emir Abd-El Kader, who managed to bring the fractious resistance into a common front against the enemy. El-Kader used guerilla tactics, drawing on rifle-armed mounted troops that relied on quick raids and ambushes. A series of treaties brought only temporary peace and the struggle continued. Ed-kader formed a core force of some 10,000 riflemen, supplemented by ad hoc irregulars. Artillery was comparatively weak, with only a small number of cannon available for effective use. Instructors from Morocco, Tunisia and Europe were invited to help train and organize the main force. Support from the Sultan of Morocco was crucial to financing and equipping this central army. Shortages of weapons was always a pressing problem- and financing methods ranged from extraordinary taxes, state monopolies and the booty from raids on hostile tribes. The resistance army also build a number of fortresses throughout its operational area.

French investments to crush the resistance were massive. By 1839 they had concentrated some 70,000 men in Algeria. By 1844, a third of the French Army was fighting in Algeria – some 108,000 troops – a stark and extraordinary contrast to the typically small European or European-led forces that conquered most of Africa. French tactics changed to counter the swift guerrilla attacks of the native resistance. Heavy formations were broken down into mobile columns, and a ruthless "scorched earth" policy of devastation, plunder and destruction was enacted- seeking to break the native resistance by destruction of its resource base. Wells were poisoned, livestock shot, fields, houses and villages burned, and inhabitants driven into the countryside or exterminated. The ruinous devastation of the countryside severely hurt the Emir's war-making efforts, as did the seizure of his strongholds by the mobile columns. By 1844, El-Kader was forced to withdraw from Algeria to Morocco. Subsequent developments saw his capture and imprisonment by the French, who confiscated massive quantities of native land for settlement of French colons or settlers. This set the stage for an equally bloody resistance war, a century later.

Emir Abdelkader.

While unsuccessful, the case of Emir Abdelkader illustrates a significant pattern in African warfare that was an alternative to massed "human wave" attacks against small European or European-led forces armed with modern rifles, artillery, and in later years, machine guns (Gatlings and Maxims). El-Kader's forces fought a mobile guerrilla war, rather than gathering conveniently in one place where they could be decimated by European firepower. His troops were also relatively well armed with good rifles, although dependent on imports. El-Kader's inability to continue arming and supplying his forces also led to his eventual defeat, and his manpower base was relatively limited. Nevertheless, it took massive numbers of French troops, outnumbering his main force by 10 to 1, and their harsh "scorched earth" policy to prevail.

==== Samori in Guinea and Ivory Coast ====
Internal conquests of Samori. The armies and operations of African leader Samori Ture offer another illustration of the diversity, strengths and weaknesses of indigenous African military systems, both prior to and after clashes with expanding European colonial powers. Samori's resistance campaign is similar to that of the tribes of Algeria, both in the enemy he fought, and chronic shortages of modern weapons. There is however contrast with Emir Abdelkader. Samori's main forces were infantry as compared to horsemen, and he pursued a "scorched earth" approach before the French to deny them resources, the reverse of the pattern under El-Kader. Samori was also a conqueror in his own right even before the coming of the French.

The gun-armed sofa infantrymen were the main striking force of Samori's army. Operating on several fronts, one part defended against the French colonial armies, while another marched east, conquering and organizing new territories and peoples.

He first rose to prominence in 1867, when he began carving out his own state in the Guinea Highlands bordering the Niger River. He understood the power of firearms early on and built up a disciplined force of musketeers. His search for reliable sources of supply was constant. Years of conquest continued and by 1878, he proclaimed himself faama (military leader) of his own Wassoulou Empire, that at its height was to include parts of today's Guinea, Mali, Sierra Leone and the northern Côte d'Ivoire. Alliances were struck with a number of African polities in this area, particularly the Fulbe (Fula) jihad state of Fouta Djallon, who were facing pressure from the expanding French to submit to a protectorate.

The aggressive expansion of the French brought them into conflict with Samori's empire. The Samorian army was also constantly on the move, fighting on multiple fronts. Faced with French pressure in the west, Samori moved east, conquering areas in the Ivory Coast and Liberia as he maneuvered for combat and logistics space. A large number of civilians moved with the army. The discussion below is drawn from studies such as Legassick's "Firearms, Horses and Samorian Army Organization (1966).

Structure of the Samorian army. Primarily infantry with cavalry as a smaller arm, the army structure consisted of 4 parts: the regulars (primarily slaves and captives), a mixed, less standardized conscripted reserve, detachments sent by allied or tributary chiefs, and a cavalry force. The basic rank of a regular infantryman was the sofa. The basic unit was a squad of ten, progressing to a company-sized unit of 200–300 men, and thence to larger groupings, typically of approximately 1,000 men. Squad and company leaders were generally mounted. Estimated numbers of fighting men are a source of debate, but the highest places an operational army at around 20,000 men. Of these about 5,000 were "regular" forces. This small permanent army of sofa-kun, directed and stiffened a larger mass of reservists. In the late years of Samoir's empire, more emphasis was placed on smaller detachments.

Weapons and logistics. The Samorian army did manage to acquire a large number of repeating rifles. Replacement and resupply however including ammunition, was a continuing problem. Freetown, under British rule in Sierra Leone, was an important source of supply. The French tried incessantly to cut this pipeline, and finally did in collaboration with the colonial government there. An attempt was made to manufacture guns indigenously, but quality was poor, although the African gunsmiths did succeed in rendering a workable breech mechanism, and in various repairs. Ammunition was also manufactured, and was so precious that after each battle, empty cartridge cases and even bullets were collected.

Tactics of the Samorian army. Samorian armies showed the capability of maneuvering against both indigenous and foreign forces. In one of his earliest clashes with the French for example, he executed a sweeping pincer movement to recapture the gold-producing center of Bure, a gambit that threatened to cut off the French rear, and forced them to withdraw. Additional victories were won at Nfadji and Dadadugu. Flexibility was also seen in Samori's organization, from the use of Konya warrior bands, to the traditional militia call-ups centered on a force of regulars, to his later use of riflemen organized in smaller European-style units. However, although Samori inflicted heavy casualties on the French in several encounters during the 1890s, growing French resources, mobility and firepower placed his regime in ultimate jeopardy. Lacking good firearms and ammunition, major battles against the French were fought by means of carefully arranged fixed lines, to maximize available firepower. Once these were disrupted however, they were difficult to reconstitute. The main forces however turned in excellent performances based on the accounts of French opponents, who were amazed at the marksmanship, discipline and maneuverability of Samori's forces. Acquisition of new breech-loading guns, enabling a soldier to both reload and fire from a concealed position, improved performance. Samori thus reduced his striking forces in the field as the war against the French progressed, cutting them into smaller detachments armed with better firearms.

Samori Ture

Infantry snipers and cavalry skirmishers began to be used more extensively and European deserters and renegades were hired to conduct troop training. Guerrilla tactics and harassment of French detachments and lines of supply received more emphasis. Infantry engagements became staggered. Rather than one fighting line persisting throughout a day, Samori's troops used multiple lines, withdrawing in more systematic fashion to form another for defense. The old call-up system was replaced by a more permanent force. Samori's army used larger formations as it fought against indigenous opponents in its southward drive towards the Ivory Coast and Guinea. Smaller numbers were deployed against the French.

Samori's armies had to remain mobile, conquering new territory on one front, harassing the French on another, and doubling back to reoccupy old areas. The south-eastern front into Ivory Coast and Guinea took up most of Samori's attention after 1891, while his "burn and retire" tactics held off the Europeans in the West.

In 1898 Samori began an epic march towards Boribana, moving an estimated 120,000 civilians along with the army. The French commander Lartigue comments on this move as being carried out successfully with credible precision and speed. French pressure continued relentlessly however, and Samori's force grew more constricted. He was captured by a small French striking force that burst into his camp from an unexpected direction in September 1898. His long struggle and disciplined organization however illustrates the capacity of indigenous systems to create new forms of organization, modify existing ones, and adapt to new or improved technology.

=== From innovation to conservatism: the Zulu military system ===
==== Military reforms of Shaka ====
The Zulu are a significant case in African military innovation and change. Their system of war transformed large portions of the continent and their methods spanned both the pre-gunpowder and gunpowder eras. Several innovations appeared as part of the existing indigenous cultural mix, and their adaptation by burgeoning kingdoms and chieftains to shifting opportunities and changes as the 19th century dawned. The best known leader to emerge from this flux was the ruthless chieftain Shaka, who adapted a number of indigenous practices that transformed the Zulu from a small, obscure tribe to a major regional power in Southern Africa. Some scholars caution against giving Shaka unlimited or sole credit for the military developments that appeared among the tribes of the region, or blaming the Zulu for all warfare and devastation in the region first half of the 19th century, when there were other players and influences in place: from expanding indigenous states like the Thembu, Ngwane, Mthethwa or Ndwamdwe, to European slave traders from Delgoa Bay, Mozambique seeking new captives.

Antecedents of Shaka and the Zulu. Modern research suggest kingdoms or chieftainships already long in place that could mobilize substantial numbers of troops, and did not have to wait for a Shaka in the 19th century to suddenly appear. Reports from one group of shipwrecked Portuguese in 1552 for example, show that they were forcibly disarmed of their muskets by a powerful local ruler heading a large fighting force. Another group of survivors of a Dutch shipwreck in 1686 could not prevent a local chieftain from breaking up the wreck and taking its iron because the commander appeared on the beach with around 1,000 disciplined warriors. Various other shipwreck survivor accounts report substantial battles between opposing forces armed with large shields and spears. Other data indicates that the Shakan reforms were not necessarily continued in all respects. Rather than rigidly using his short spear only, the Zulu soldier in the Anglo-Zulu clash of 1879 typically carried a "kit" of throwing spears that were flung first, rather like the Roman pilum to "soften up" and occupy the enemy, followed by a quick advance and close quarters work with a hand-held stabbing spear. The tactical advantages of a combined missile-shock "kit" for these later troops, outweighed Shaka's earlier "hand-to-hand spear only" dictum.

Adaptations of Shaka. Age-grade groupings, the advantages of an aggressive charge or encircling an enemy, etc., are all known in local warfare of the period. Elements of a regimental system for example had been put in place under Shaka's predecessor Dingiswayo. What was different were much more ruthless combinations and systematic uses of all these elements to produce the distinctive Zulu system. Shaka borrowed and adapted the surrounding cultural elements to implement his own aggressive vision, seeking to bring combat to a swift and bloody decision, as opposed to ritualistic displays or duels of individual champions, scattered raids, or skirmishes where casualties were comparatively light. Such a brutal focus demanded changes in weapons, organization and tactics.

==== New weapons and new organisation ====
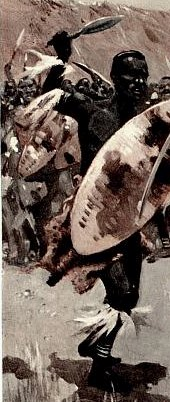
Military innovations such as the assegai, the age-grade regimental system and encirclement tactics helped make the Zulu one of the most powerful nations in southern and south-eastern Africa.

New spear and shield. Shaka is credited with introducing a new variant of the traditional weapon, discarding the long, spindly throwing weapon and instituting a heavy, shorter stabbing spear, the iKlwa. The spear was wielded underhand, on the manner of the Roman sword. He is also said to have introduced a larger, heavier cowhide shield, and trained his forces to use them both in closing quickly with the enemy in more effective hand-to-hand combat. Local skirmishers used to tossing their spears and pulling back would be confronted by an aggressive force closing for the kill. None of these weapons changes are spectacular in the local context, but mated to an aggressive mobility and tactical organisation, they were to make a devastating impact.

Logistics. The fast moving host lived off the land primarily, but were also aided with a supply system provided by young boys, who were attached to a force and carried rations, cooking pots, sleeping mats, extra weapons, rations, and other material. Cattle were sometimes driven on the hoof as a movable larder. Again, such arrangements in the local context were probably nothing unusual. What was different was the systematisation and organisation, a pattern yielding major benefits when the Zulu were dispatched on military missions. Shaka's general ratio of logistic personnel was one herdboy to three men.

Age-grade regimental system. Age-grade groupings of various sorts were common in the Bantu culture of the day. Shaka manipulated this system, transferring the loyalty of the traditional clan groupings to himself, thus strengthening his personal hegemony. Such groupings on the basis of age, did not constitute a permanent, paid military in the modern Western sense, nevertheless they did provide a stable basis for sustained armed mobilisation, much more so than ad hoc levies or war parties. Shaka organised the various age grades into regiments, and quartered them in special military kraals, with each regiment having its own distinctive names and insignia.

Mobility and training. Shaka discarded sandals to enable his warriors to run faster. Initially the move was unpopular, but those who objected were simply killed, a practice that quickly concentrated the minds of available personnel. Shaka drilled his troops frequently, implementing forced marches that could cover more than fifty miles a day. He also drilled the troops to carry out encirclement tactics (see below). Such mobility gave the Zulu a significant impact in their local region and beyond.

Encirclement tactics. The Zulu typically took the offensive, deploying in the well known "buffalo horns" formation. The attack layout was composed of four elements, each of which represented a grouping of Zulu regiments:

1. Left horn or flank
2. Right horn or flank

The "horns" or flanking elements were used to encircle and pin the enemy. Generally the "horns" were made up of younger greener troops and could be maneuvered separately as needed in an operation.

1. The "Chest" or central main force which delivered the coup de grace. The prime fighters made up the composition of the main force.
2. The "Loins" or reserves used to exploit success or reinforce elsewhere. Often these were older veterans, sometimes positioned with their backs to the battle so as not to get unduly excited.

Organisation of the Zulu forces. The Zulu forces were generally grouped into 3 levels: regiments, corps of several regiments, and "armies" or bigger formations, although the Zulu did not use these terms in the modern sense. Size distinctions were taken account of, any grouping of men on a mission could collectively be called an impi, whether a raiding party of 100 or horde of 10,000. Numbers were not uniform, but dependent on a variety of factors including assignments by the king, or the manpower mustered by various clan chiefs or localities. A regiment might be 400 or 4000 men. These were grouped into Corps that took their name from the military kraals where they were mustered, or sometimes the dominant regiment of that locality. While the modest Zulu population could not turn out the hundreds of thousand available to major world or continental powers like France, Britain, or Russia, the Zulu "nation in arms" approach could mobilize substantial forces in local context for short campaigns, and maneuver them in the Western equivalent of divisional strength. The victory won by Zulu king Cetawasyo at Ndondakusuka, for example, two decades before the Anglo-Zulu War of 1879, involved a battlefield deployment of 30,000 troops.

Higher command and unit leadership. An inDuna guided each regiment, and he in turn answered to senior izinduna who controlled the corps grouping. Overall guidance of the host was furnished by elder izinduna usually with many years of experience. One or more of these elder chiefs might accompany a big force on an important mission. Coordination of tactical movements was supplied by the indunas who used hand signals and messengers. Generally before deploying for battle, the regiments were made to squat in a semicircle while these commanders made final assignments and adjustments. Lower level regimental izinduna, like the NCOs of today's armies, and yesterday's Roman centurions, were extremely important to morale and discipline. Prior to the clash at Isandhlwana for example, they imposed order on the frenzied rush of warriors eager to get at the British, and steadied those faltering under withering enemy fire during the battle.

==== The Zulu in the gunpowder era ====
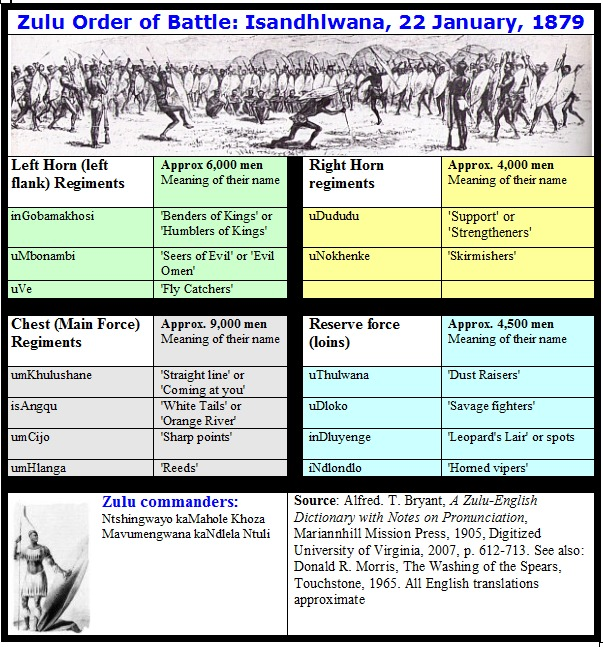
At Isandhlawana, the Zulu impis scored their greatest victory, liquidating a significant part of the British invasion force. More British officers were killed at Isandhlawana by the Zulu, than Napoleon killed at Waterloo.

Victories. The Zulu system spanned both the spear and gunpowder eras and exemplified the typical outcome in Africa when native armies were confronted by European forces armed with modern weapons. Unlike many other native armies however, the Zulu scored one of the biggest African victories over colonial forces, annihilating a British column at Isandhlawana and almost over-running a detachment at Rorke's Drift. Proceeding at a more leisurely pace than their reputed 50 miles per day, a large impi approached the British camp almost undetected, in dispersed units that hid its full strength. The total force was concentrated and positioned in a deep ravine near the enemy position, waiting until the omens were good for an assault. Discovered by a British cavalry patrol, the entire impi sprang up as one man, and launched their attack from some 4 miles away, in their classic "buffalo horns" formation.

Morris (1965) holds that in the fluid situation, the commanding Zulu generals struggled to shape the battle and position their forces in the proper order as the warriors streamed forward, but only succeeded in holding back one corps (the Undi), and one regiment (the uDloko) which had been located a mile behind the main body. McBride (1976) maintains that the Zulu commanders were already well informed by their scouts (izinhloli) of British dispositions and their preliminary positioning and the classic 'buffalo horns' deployment would shape the resulting battle despite the early running start, with the right horn circling the mountain to attack from the rear, the felt horn pinning the redcoats in place and cutting them off, the chest delivering the main blow, and the "loins" held back in reserve from the initial rush. These "tail end" reserves, who had been held in check by their unit commanders, were to later pursue fugitives and clash with the stalwart British defenders of Rorke's Drift. Whatever the final adjustments made, both writers show that the Zulu force, for all its eagerness, was no wild horde, but a disciplined formation, moving into combat according to its training.

The attack was met by withering British rifle, rocket and artillery fire that made part of the advance falter. The British however had divided their forces- part of it being away on a search for the main Zulu Army. That army materialized behind their backs at Isandlwana, and moved quickly to exploit the situation. Poor positioning and deployment of troops, (failure to base the camp on a strong central wagon or laager fortification for example also contributed to fatal weaknesses in the British defences, and the fiery exhortations of the regimental indunas encouraged the host of warriors to continue attacking. When pressure by the maneuvering Zulu formations caused the crumbling of the redcoat line, the Zulu prongs surged through and around the gaps, annihilating the camp's defenders. Some recent historians hold that much play was given to the relatively small Rorke's Drift battle to divert attention from the disaster at Isandhlwana where the Zulu clearly outmaneuvered the British, and lured the redcoats into splitting their strength through diversionary actions around Magogo Hills and Mangeni Falls. These gambits saw Chelmsford leading a substantial detachment out in search of the elusive Zulu "main impi" leaving half his army behind at the Isandhlwana camp.

It was at Isandhlwana that the main force materialized undetected to liquidate their enemies. They also hold that the main Zulu force was not a startled horde that simply charged when discovered, but had already been generally pre-positioned by their commanders for the great surge forward. The liquidation of almost 1,000 European troops with modern arms by the African spearmen sparked disbelief and uproar in Britain. Aside from the losses of British regulars, and the supporting native levies, the Zulu impi killed more British officers at Isandhlawana, than Napoleon killed at Waterloo. Historian John Laband also maintains that the Zulu approach march to the battle was an excellent one, that screened their final movement across the face of the opposition force, and took advantage of Chelmsford's fatal spitting of British fighting strength:

"Meanwhile, the joint Zulu commanders, who had indeed been considering a flank march to Chelmsford's east to join with Matshana and cut the British column off from Natal, decided instead to take advantage of the general's division of forces. They detached men to reinforce Matshana, but on the same evening of 21 January and during the next they transferred the main army across the British front to the deep shelter of the Ngwebeni valley. This was truly a masterful manoeuvre. The amabutho moved rapidly in small units, mainly concealed from the Isandlwana camp nine miles away by the Nyoni Heights. The British mounted patrols that sighted some of the apparently isolated Zulu units had no inkling an entire army was on the move."

Defeat. Long term Zulu success against a major world power however was a questionable proposition. Even in the victory at Isandhlwana the Zulu had taken heavy losses, and the efficacy of spears and a few untrained gunmen against modern rifles, machine guns and artillery of a major nation was ultimately limited. In his earlier encounters with European visitors to his kingdom, the Zulu King Shaka had dismissed firearms as ineffective against the massed charge of the regiments. At Isandhlawana, the monarch's boast held true, and it was not an unreasonable one, given the slow-firing, sometimes malfunctioning, obsolete trade muskets the Europeans demonstrated. But as the Zulu War went on, massed rifle and artillery fire repeatedly broke the back of Zulu attacks, as they persisted in assaulting heavily fortified positions and failed to use captured firearms effectively. Despite earlier defeats by the Boers using guns, 4 decades earlier, the Zulu had not sufficiently adapted to the realities of firepower on the battlefield,. They also failed to effectively cut the vulnerable supply lines of their enemies- leaving the Natal rear area virtually untouched for example.

Contrary to popular belief many African armies did not have vast supplies of fighting personnel (see "Significant Influences" above). The war put tremendous pressure on the Zulus relatively limited manpower resources, a pattern repeated throughout Africa where comparatively small kingdoms clashed with European states like Britain or France. At Isandhlwana for example, the Zulu main force had marched for three days straight, without eating on the last two. As the regiments deployed for attack they had a four-mile run to reach the British camp, before entering into the immediate battle. The reserve force of the impi, the uDokolo regiment, had another twelve mile run to make immediately after, where they attacked the fortified British position for ten hours straight. Such intensity could not be sustained with available manpower and logistics. At the final Battle of Ulundi, the depleted Zulu formations made a relatively weak attack before being scattered. Some historians hold that the victory at Ulindi was a token one, driven by the need for Lord Chelmsford to salvage some success after Isandhlwana, and the British withdrew quickly followed by Chelmsford's resignation as commanded of the British forces. The end of the war saw the Zulu retaining their lands.

"Seen in terms of the political ends for which the war was fought, the battle of Ulundi, like the campaign in Zululand itself, was a failure. The effectiveness of Zulu resistance had destroyed the policy which brought about the war, and discredited the men responsible. The only point on which all whites agreed was that some form of face-saving military victory was required in Zululand. Ulundi was that token military victory. It did not end the war in Zululand—peace was attained by Sir Garnet Wolseley who, as Chelmsford scurried out of the country, entered Zululand proclaiming that if the Zulu returned to their homes they would be left in full possession of their land and their property. By July 1879 both sides desired an end to hostilities. For reasons of economy, because of military requirements elsewhere and the political capital being made out of the war, the British government wanted an end to this embarrassing demonstration of military ineptitude. Any chance of an easy military conquest of the entire territory seemed slight: the army was tied to its inadequate supply lines, and conquest would have necessitated a change in strategy and tactics which presupposed a change in military leadership. It was easier and cheaper to elevate Ulundi to the rank of a crushing military victory and abandon plans to subjugate the Zulu people than to create the force of mobile righting units which would have been required to conquer the Zulu completely."

==== Influence of the Zulu system ====
The Zulu military system was to transform large swathes of the continent, from south east Africa, into parts of East and Central Africa through the disruptive warfare that broke out during the reign of Zulu king Shaka. The disruption, known as the Mfecane had several causes, but it was to create several powerful nations in its wake, such as the Swazi, the Nebebele, the Shangaan and others. Many of these new powers copied Zulu methods, weapons and tactics, and saw a measure of success against both indigenous and foreign opponents. The Shangaan for example, founded by war-leader Soshangane, were to migrate into what is now Mozambique and force the Portuguese into paying them tribute.

=== Horses, guns, and indigenous adaptation in Southern Africa ===
Guns, wagons and horses gave the Boer commandos important tactical advantages over their foes. These weapons were later acquired by some groups like the Griqua and the Basotho.

The powerful horse and gun system of the Boers. While not indigenous to the continent, the horse and gun system of the Boers, and their defensive wagon laager, was to have profound effects on military developments in the southern portion of Africa. Mounted warfare enabled them to beat or fight a wide variety of African enemies to a standstill, although they suffered their share of defeats over the decades. Skilled horsemen, and excellent shots, the Boers acquitted themselves well in a variety of tactical situations, against both African enemies and imperial forces. Several groups arose that emulated the horse and gun system. Prominent among these were the outcasts, the half-caste or mixed race product of Dutch and African interaction, and/or alliances with other dispossessed elements- peoples like the Griqua, Bergnaars, Koranna and Basters. Acquiring weapons and mounts over the course of time, they too began to carve out their own sphere of influence in the region, alternately battling Boer, Bantu and Briton at various times in their history.

Rise of the Basotho system. Several indigenous kingdoms such as the Tlokoa, Pedi and Basotho took up horse and gun, despite collaboration between the Boers and the Cape colonists to prevent such transfers, particularly of firearms. The Basotho, a small grouping threatened by the Zulu, Ndebele, as well as the Europeans, adapted to both weapons systems, and carried out a complex mix of warfare and diplomacy to fend off their enemies. They became avid horsemen, and in time, developed the tough, durable breed, that was to be known as the Basuto pony. The Basotho equipped their mounted fighters with guns, although the traditional spear, battle-axe, and knobkerrie (club) continued in use. Most of the firearms were low quality flintlocks, and ammunition and gunpowder were usually in short supply. Marksmanship according to contemporary European observers was not as good as that of the Boers. The Basotho warriors also relied heavily on fortifications in their mountainous country, the most famous of which was Thaba Boisu, fortress capital of their king Moshoeshoe.

Battles against English and Boer forces. The Basotho clashed with several enemies to maintain their fragile independence. In the 1840s they fought against the Tlokwa, who were also mounted, and against the Zulu-influenced Nedebele, who were primarily infantry. In 1851, a British colonial force launched an expedition into Sotho country and was soundly defeated at the battle of Kononyaba (or Viervoet). Against the British, who deployed an artillery piece, the spear and battle-axe proved more useful than guns when the Sotho hemmed in the British on a mountaintop. Victory was gained by close hand-to-hand fighting. This incident provided a significant check to British power in the area. The following year another British force tried its luck, and was also defeated. This encounter saw the widespread deployment of Sotho cavalry. At one point in the battle, some 6,000 Basotho horsemen mounted a charge against the British formation. They were repulsed by rifle and artillery fire. Nevertheless, the native regiments controlled the field at the end of the day, and the British withdrew.

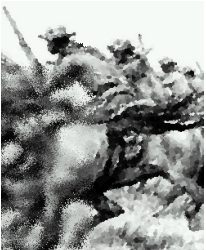
Basotho cavalry relied on open order deployment rather than the standardized formations of many contemporary US or European forces. Against one British force in 1852 some 6,000 Basotho horsemen charged the enemy line.

Facing a colonial ban against arms sales to Africans in the 1850s, the Basotho desperately tried to manufacture their own cartridges and gunpowder with assistance from European deserters. The results were poor and of little value when a Boer invasion from the Orange Free State threatened in 1858. The Boer force was armed with modern breech-loading rifles and several pieces of artillery, and their firepower took a heavy toll against the indigenous warriors. The Basotho however withdrew to their mountain strongholds, particularly Thaba Boisiu, and a siege commenced. Counterattacks from the fortress saw some success, with one foray killing 30 enemy troops, and the siege became a stalemate. Eventually the Boers were forced to withdraw when the Basotho dispatched horsemen to raid homesteads and fields behind their lines.

Another Boer invasion in 1867 was more dangerous for the Basotho. The Europeans had upgraded their rifles, obtained more powerful artillery, and augmented their numbers with white volunteers from across South Africa. Once again they converged on Thaba Boisu, liquidating local strongholds on the way. A first assault against the fortress ended in failure. A second drove the Basotho back from their advanced defence lines, but also became bogged down. A third also stalled when a Boer leader was shot dead. The conflict dragged on for 6 months as the Boers ravaged Basotho territory, seizing cattle, people and burning crops to bring their opponents to heel. In early 1868 however Moshoeshoe persuaded the British to intervene and placed his kingdom under crown protection. This ended the Boer siege although a subsequent treaty transferred yet more Basotho land to their enemies.

The 'gun war' – defeat of colonial forces. The Basotho continued to use their horse-gun system under the new colonial regime to maintain their independence. In the 1880s, their territory was annexed by Cape Colony and a punitive expedition of 800 white troops and 1500 African allies was dispatched to crush the opposition of one Moorosi, a dissenting Sotho chieftain. Moorosi gathered some 300 gunmen in a strong mountaintop position and fought off the colonial forces for over 8 months. After three major assaults, and continuous shelling by artillery, the position was overrun, Moroosi was killed and his lands seized. As the struggle with Moorosi raged, colonial authorities reserved part of Basutoland for white settlement and demanded that all natives surrender their firearms. This demand was rejected and another British expedition was dispatched to administer the mandate, sparking the so-called "Gun War." The Sotho horsemen however used a flexible mix of tactics: defensive positions on fortified hills, attacks against administrative centers of the colonial regime, and frequent use of guerrilla strikes and ambushes against lumbering colonial columns, most notably a column of British lancers at Qalabani. The combination of mobility, firepower, ambushes, and hit and run strikes was sufficient to stalemate or defeat the Basotho's enemies for almost a year. Stymied, the colonial army, and the disarmament demand was withdrawn.

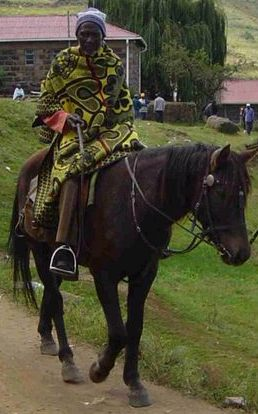
Rejecting British demands to surrender their guns, mounted Basotho fighters repulsed British attacks during the "Gun War", 1880–81.

End of the regional balance of power. While other African groups adapted to horses and guns, the Basotho state successfully maintained a measure of independence from the many enemies that sought to destroy it. The Basotho case again demonstrates the complexity of African military systems, often conceived mainly in terms of hordes of attacking, spear-wielding infantry. A fuller picture must include the cavalry tradition, both in the south and in western Africa, and must take into account the alternative, tactical defensive style of peoples like the Shona and Basotho. The case of the Basotho, Zulu, Xhosa and others also shows that indigenous militaries could learn and adapt, and could achieve credible performances even in the 19th century. Some historians note that a rough balance of power prevailed in the region, with native military systems generally holding their own against European forces and local colonial levies. The heavier intervention of imperial powers, however, choked off the free market in firearms, and resulted in the deployment of regular imperial troops with modern repeating rifles, artillery and machine guns. Such imperial troops in turn, were also to crush Boer power during the Boer War, circa 1899–1902.

=== Adapting to modern arms: the Ethiopians at Adowa ===
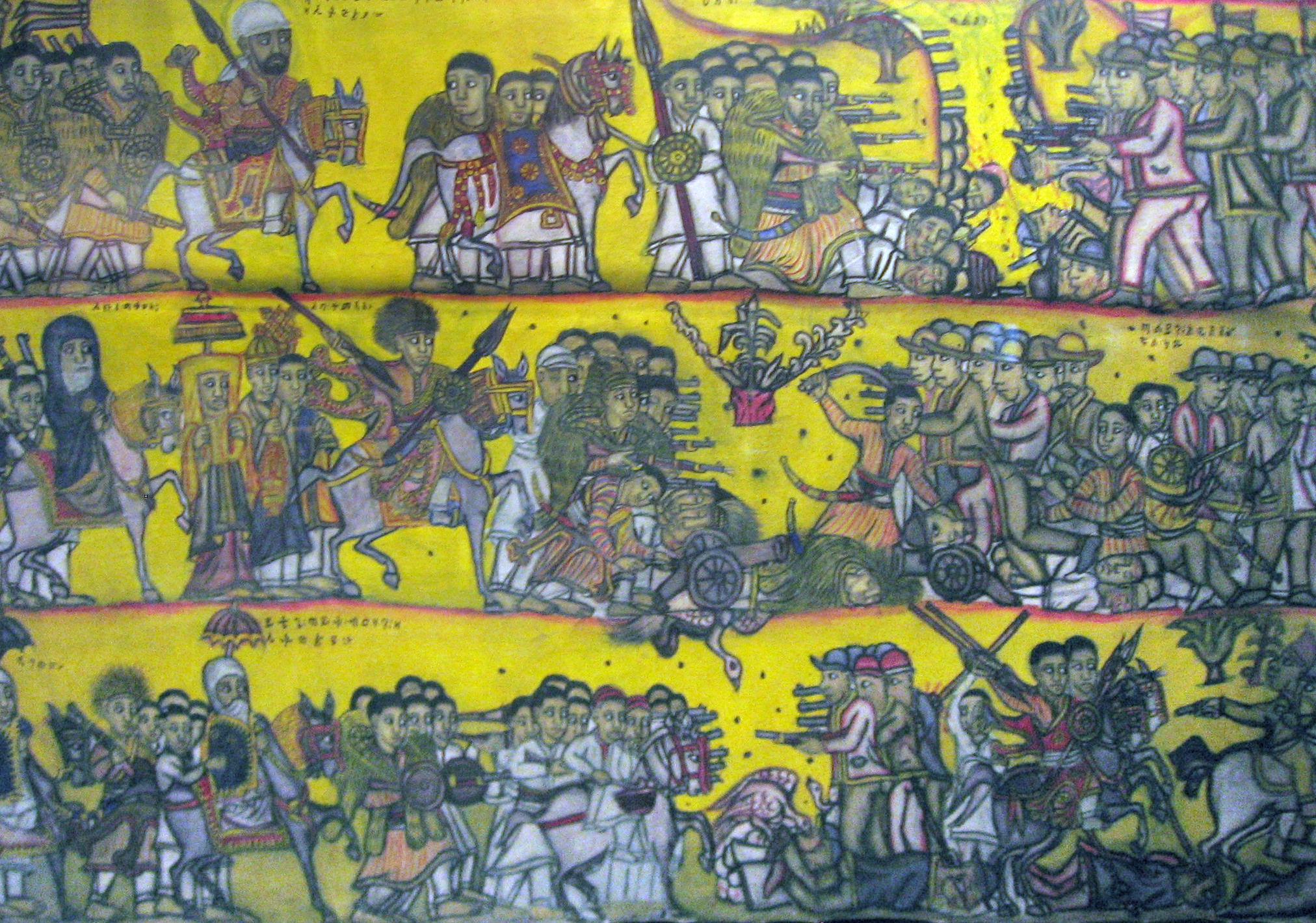
Proficiency in handling modern rifles and artillery aided the Ethiopians in the historic defeat of the Italians at Adowa. Ethiopian artillery for example outgunned Italian batteries at one point in the encounter.

The Ethiopian victory at Adowa demonstrates the increasing ability of African forces to handle modern arms as gunpowder weapons began to dominate the field. Painful lessons in the killing efficiency of rifled firepower had been dealt the Ethiopian forces in earlier encounters with European armies. At the battle of Aroge for example, British volleys from breechloading rifles routed the Emperor Tewodros' troops, and the campaign was to end in his death and the captured of his capital.

Adaptations to modern arms. Others learned however. Tewodros's successor, Yohannes IV had been backed by the British and received 500,000 pounds (sterling) worth of military equipment. This was put to good use against a variety of other enemies, including the Mahdi's dervish forces from the Sudan, and in inflicting a crushing defeat on an Italian force at the Battle of Dogali in 1887. In 1875 and 1876, Yohannes' troops also defeated substantial Egyptian armies trained and officered by European mercenaries and US Civil War veterans. The Egyptians had been equipped with Remington rifles, Krupp artillery, Gatling guns and rocket tubes. This hardware was transferred to the victorious Ethiopian forces, and captured Egyptian gunners were pressed into service, training the Ethiopians to use the big guns. Yohannes' successor Menelik continued the armed buildup, and by the 1890s the Ethiopians were a tough fighting force on their own ground, capable of mobilizing massive numbers of infantry.

Military and diplomatic links with other nations such as Imperial Russia (chief military mission in the war-time were also established, with personnel such as Nikolay Leontiev) leading a mission of Russian military advisers and volunteers to aid in modernizing Menelik's army. Other officers such as Leonid Artamonov, a Russian general, geographer and traveler, were also military advisers of Menelik II. Leontiev would command Russian volunteers, advisers at the Adwa battlefield. Historian Bruce Vandervort in Wars of Imperial Conquest in Africa, 1830–1914, notes that around 100,000 Ethiopian soldiers fought at Adowa, with about 70,000 of them carrying modern repeating rifles. The bulk of these were infantry. The remaining 30,000 men fought with traditional weapons- spear, sword and buffalo-hide shield. The Ethiopians also deployed a number of machine guns, and were the only Africans to employ artillery to any extent during the colonial wars. Some of their gunners were foreign, but many were indigenous artillerymen, who took over the batteries captured from the Egyptians. The performance of the artillery arm proved a key factor in the Ethiopian victory. Their "quick- firing Hotchkiss artillery forced the surrender of an Italian fort in the run-up to the battle of Adowa, and actually outgunned an Italian battery at a crucial point during the battle itself.". In many ways the Ethiopian army at Adowa was a traditional one that lacked the industrial base and elaborated military establishment of the typical European force. Proficiency however had been gained through long years of campaigning, as the various emperors consolidated power over internal and external foes.

"Taken all together, the Ethiopian Army was formidable by any standards. Its tough fighting men were masters of both skirmish, or ambush warfare and shock action. A rare combination by African standards, and one that often caused unpleasant surprises for Ethiopia's enemies."

At Adowa, victorious Ethiopian forces inflicted the most casualties of any major 19th Century battle, a rate exceeding 50%, more than that inflicted on the French at Eylau or Waterloo.

Such proficiency however masked many internal weaknesses, including poor logistics, and lack of advanced standardization in organization. Before the battle for example, the Emperor was considering leaving the field because of low supplies. Such deficiencies would count heavily against the indigenous forces in later years when faced with a new Italian invasion under Mussolini in the 1930s. Nevertheless, on the day of Adowa, the Ethiopians were supremely ready for the struggle before them.

The battle. At Adowa, the Italian force, estimated at 18,000 were heavily outnumbered, but had good rifles and some 56 pieces of artillery, and was also stiffened by high quality, elite bersaglieri and alpini units that marched with some 15,000 European soldiers supported by a smaller number of 3,000 African askari. Prior to the encounter, their commander Bartieri dug into a strong fortified position, hoping to lure the Ethiopians into attacking him. They did not oblige, and a stalemate ensued. Urgings from Rome prompted Bartieri to advance against the Ethiopian concentration at Adowa. The Emperor was considering retreat as supplies ran low, but also hoped that by maneuver, he would draw out his opponents.

The Italian advance set the stage for battle. Their forward movement on Adowa was a confused affair and their columns became separated. Ethiopians troops positioned themselves to intercept, and covered by accurate artillery fire, launched a fierce attack that took advantage of this vulnerability, rolling up the Italian line with continuous pressure. They killed over 3,000 Italians and wounded hundreds. A smaller number of African soldiers in Italian service, about 2,000, were also killed, and over 1,000 wounded. A further 954 Italian troops were missing in action, and the army lost some 11,000 rifles, all of its 56 artillery pieces, and had to endure guerrilla attacks as it pulled back from the killing zone. Ethiopian losses were about 7,000 dead and 10,000 wounded. Thousands of European captives were taken, and the Italian government paid some 10 million lire in reparation money for the survivors after the defeat. Some 800 Tigrean askari troops who fought for the Italians met a more brutal fate. Considered traitors, they had their right hands and left feet cut off. Although the Ethiopians were to be less successful or prepared some 40 years later against Mussolini's troops, the victory at Adowa, which repeated the smaller triumph at Dogali some 9 years earlier, was to become a landmark in African military history.

Significance of the Adowa victory. News of the disaster caused the fall of the Crispi government in Italy and riots in urban areas. The shock of Adowa exceeded the British shock at Isandhlwana, with both disasters magnified by the realization that forces armed with medieval weaponry had beaten modern European regulars in the open field. As one Italian historian notes:

"It was the realization that their belief in their superiority over the "blacks" was an illusion.. A whole swaggering ethos.. of conquest was shattered before the eyes of soldiers who saw thousands of human lives snuffed out in a few hours in a strange and hostile land with no possibility of defence, who succumbed before a people who had been reduced to semi-savages in their eyes, who were beaten by an African army depicted right up to the eve of battle as disorganized, poorly armed and incapable of formulating a strategy."

While Adowa has attracted much attention in a political and African nationalist sense, one Western military historian notes that the battle was a relatively costly affair for a European army in terms of force-ratio casualties- indeed one of the most proportionately costly major battles of the 19th century.

"Baratieri's army suffered 50 percent casualties, far higher than those suffered by participants in any other major battle of the nineteenth century. Eylau, the greatest blood-letting of the Napoleonic era, cost the French army casualties of 33.8 per cent and its losses at Waterloo were just under 30 per cent. "Macello, carneficina, strage" (butchery, slaughterhouse, slaughter) are the words which recur in the memories of the Italian combatants at Adowa."

== Summary of African military systems: 1800–1900 ==
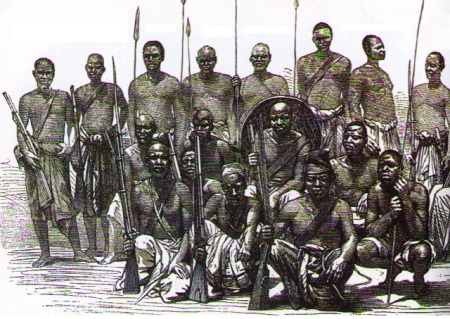
The 19th century saw a dynamic process of indigenous military innovation and development not simply colonialism.

Military systems on the continent during the 19th century illustrate the complexity of previous eras, to which was added the growing pace and weight of European colonialism. These systems defy the easy categorization and depictions of popular media and imagination- often stereotyped in terms of wildly charging hordes on foot, while ignoring the continent's long established archery and cavalry traditions. As noted by one Western historian for example, the notion of countless attacking spearmen is a myth. Manpower resources were often limited. In the 19th century, European nations like Prussia could put some 300,000 men into a single campaign. Only the Ethiopians at Adowa with their 100,000 effectives approached this level of mobilization – "the savage hordes of popular lore seldom materialized on African battlefields." At times however, local troop concentrations for battle could be quite substantial, comparing favorably with the numbers available in smaller European states, or on some European battlefields. For example, combat forces of some 12,000 to 13,000 cavalry are documented for one kingdom in pre-colonial West Africa, comparable to the numbers Napoleon would deploy at Waterloo.

Indigenous military organization also encompasses Africa's substantial cavalry or mounted tradition, from the armored chevaliers of Western Africa, to the desert horsemen of North Africa, to the mounted fighters of the Basotho in their southern redoubts. On the waters of the continent, naval activities must be accounted for, not simply canoe transport, but fighting vessels, ports, and troop landings covered by poisoned arrows, bullets and cannonballs. Different styles of warfare and modes of organization are also demonstrated by indigenous systems, from the patient tactical defensive of the Basotho, the elaborate armies of Ashanti, the sweeping offensive horns of the Zulu impi, and the protracted guerrilla styles and archery of forest peoples like the Lobi, or the San (Bushmen) further south. As regards styles of organization, different approaches over different eras can be seen. Among the Kongo kingdoms of the 18th century for example, a mixture of unit types was deployed – heavy infantry with strong shields for example, backed by lighter contingents armed with bows and spears. Special units of elite troops and bodyguards were also maintained. Like the reorganized Roman legions of old however, the later Zulu system dispensed with such distinctions in favor of one streamlined combat organization and method. Such standardized methods were to be copied by other tribes, and were to dominate or influence large parts of southern Africa and beyond during the 19th century. Such complexity again illustrates that African military systems cannot be conceived of in static, one-dimensional terms.

The introduction of firearms does not tell the whole story of the 19th century due to their mixed impact and use in many regions. Indeed, some historians argue that mere advanced technology was not the single most decisive factor in the outcome of many colonial conquests. More important, was the divided, fragmented nature of many small African polities that enabled them to be defeated separately by their enemies. Such fragmentation is not unique to Africa. Germany for example in 1815, was split into over 30 separate states. Despite these weaknesses, until well into the second part of the century, many native forces held their own until the coming of modern artillery, machine guns and rifles.

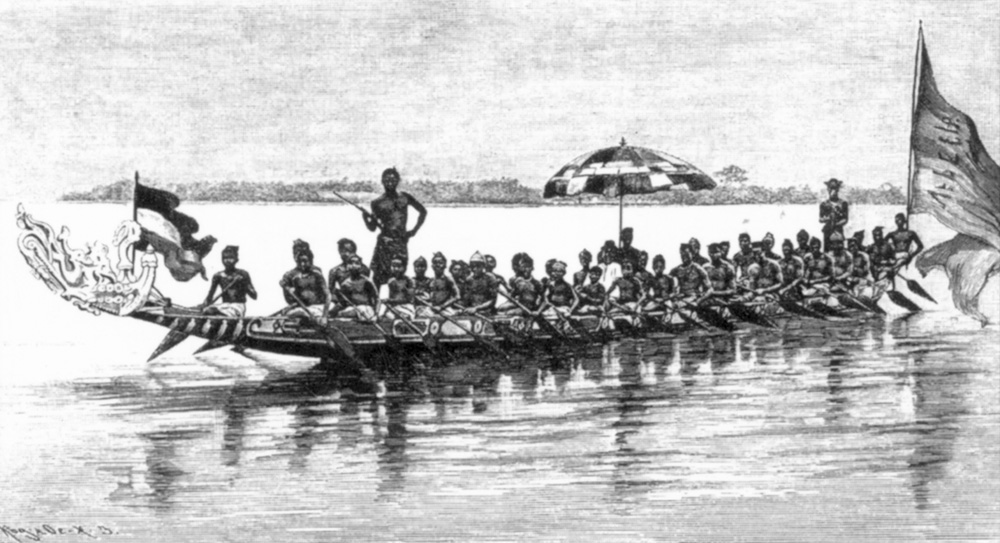
Duala war-canoe, Cameroon, 1884

The 19th century also cannot be seen simply in terms of European plans or schemes, some historians maintain. Instead, African states were executing their own agendas, based on whatever internal factors they thought relevant. Such internal factors and actors (Shaka for example) sparked a number of significant conflicts on the continent. The European powers sometimes had to react to these internal developments rather than implement neat, pre-planned schemes. Thus Britain initially had little interest in the Sudan, but the sweeping conquests of the Mahdi forced it to take action to safeguard in part, its position in Egypt and the strategic Red Sea route to other parts of the empire. In the case of the Zulu War, some historians have called it "an unauthorized aggression conducted for reasons of geopolitical strategy" and argue that Britain's main interest was safeguarding the Cape of Good Hope as a strategic base and route to India. This meant control of the region's ports – Cape Town, Simonstown, and Durban – and the liquidation of potential threats from further inland like the Zulu kingdom. This strategy backfired in part when the Zulu chose to go to war rather than be annexed. In short, rather than being mere passive actors awaiting colonization, controllers of indigenous military systems were evolving new forms of organization, refining existing ones, or adapting old ones to fit changing opportunities and advanced technology. Their successes, failures, methods, and styles form part of the complex pattern of the military arts on the continent.

== See also ==
- African military systems before 1800
- African military systems after 1900
- Military history of Africa
- Ashanti Empire
- Impi
- Battle of Isandlwana

== Bibliography ==
- Morris, Donald The Washing of the Spears, Touchstone, 1965
- Vandervort, Bruce Wars of Imperial Conquest in Africa: 1830–1914, Indiana University Press: 1998 ISBN 0253211786
