= List of African Union military interventions =

The African Union has the power to militarily intervene on behalf of its member states as laid out in Article 4(h) of the Constitutive Act of the African Union, "in respect of grave circumstances, namely: war crimes, genocide and crimes against humanity.” They have done so on multiple occasions. Herein is a list of military interventions taken by the African Union in its member states in chronological order from their start dates. Operations have been carried out in Burundi, Central African Republic, Comoros, Darfur, Democratic Republic of the Congo, Mali, Somalia, South Sudan, Sudan and Uganda.

- 2003–2004, African Union Mission in Burundi (AMIB)
- 2004–2007, African Union Mission in Sudan (AMIS)
- 2007–2021, United Nations–African Union Mission in Darfur (UNAMID)
- 2007–2021, African Union Mission to Somalia (AMISOM)
- 2008, 2008 invasion of Anjouan, also known as Operation Democracy in Comoros.
- 2022–2025, African Union Transition Mission in Somalia (ATMIS)
- 2025–ongoing, African Union Support and Stabilization Mission in Somalia (AUSSOM)
- 2011–2018, Regional Cooperation Initiative for the elimination of the Lord's Resistance Army (RCI-LRA) through the African Union Regional Task Force (AU-RTF) in Uganda, South Sudan, the Democratic Republic of the Congo and Central African Republic.
- 2013–2013, African-led International Support Mission to Mali (AFISMA), organized by ECOWAS. Transitioned into the UN-mission MINUSMA.
- 2013–2014, African-led International Support Mission to the Central African Republic (MISCA). Transitioned into the UN-mission MINUSCA.

== See also ==
- List of non-UN peacekeeping missions
