= Manufacture d'armes de Saint-Étienne =

French state-owned weapons manufacturer

Manufacture d'Armes de Saint-Étienne
- Type: Government-owned corporation (subsidiary of Nexter defense conglomerate)
- Industry: Weapons
- Founded: 1764
- Defunct: 2001
- Fate: Annexed
- Successor: Nexter
- Headquarters: Saint-Étienne, France
- Products: Rifles, pistols, tanks, weapon systems

The Manufacture d'Armes de Saint-Étienne, often abbreviated to MAS ("Saint-Étienne Weapons Factory" in English), was a French state-owned weapons manufacturer in the town of Saint-Étienne, Loire. Founded in 1764, it was merged into the French state-owned defense conglomerate GIAT Industries in 2001.

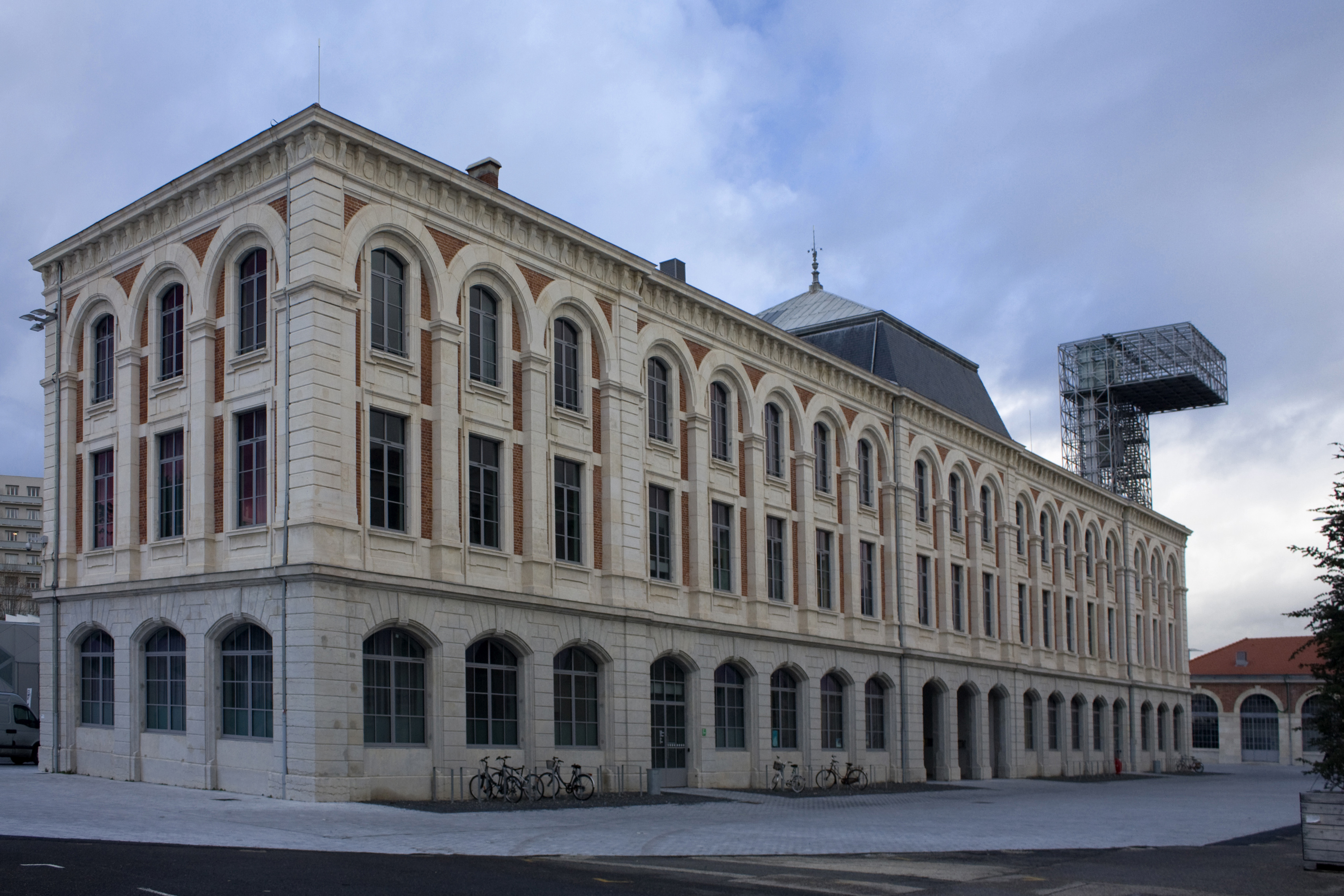
Saint Étienne-La Manufacture d'Armes in January 2011

== History ==
Saint-Étienne was well known as a center of sword and knife manufacturing beginning in the Middle Ages. In 1665, a Royal Arms Depot was created in Paris to store military weapons made in Saint-Étienne. The Manufacture d'Armes de Saint-Étienne was created by royal decree in 1764 under the supervision of the General Inspector of the Royal Arms Manufacture of Charleville.

12,000 weapons were being produced each year when the French Revolution began in 1789. The city was renamed Armsville during the Revolutionary period and production increased to arm the French Revolutionary Army. Subsequently, the French Empire required a threefold increase in production to meet the needs of the Grande Armée in its conquest of Europe. By 1838, during the July Monarchy, annual production was well over 30,000 firearms.

In 1864, the modern factory was built, new steam-powered machines were installed and the first military standardized bolt-action rifle, the Chassepot, was produced from 1866 on, then the Gras rifle after 1874. The MAC-designed Lebel rifle entered production in 1886. MAS later designed and manufactured the family of rifles chambered in 7.5×54mm French, from the MAS-36 through the MAS-49/56, then later the FAMAS bullpup assault rifle, which uses the 5.56×45mm NATO round.

In 2001, weapons production ceased as MAS was absorbed into the Nexter Group. OPTSYS, a Nexter subsidiary specializing in optical equipment and protected vision for armored vehicles, is currently located in Saint-Étienne.

== Arms produced by MAS ==
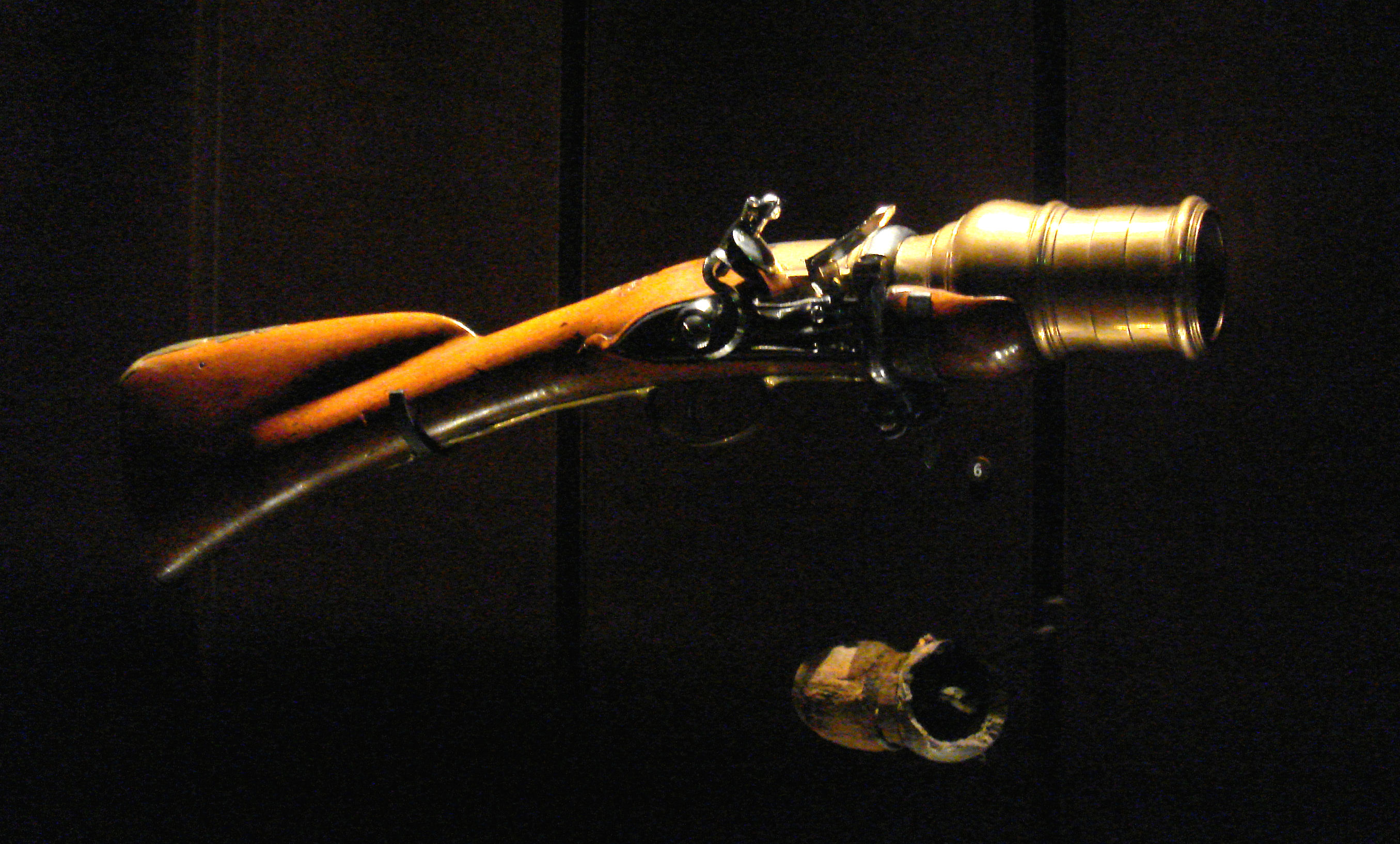
Grenade launcher with grenade

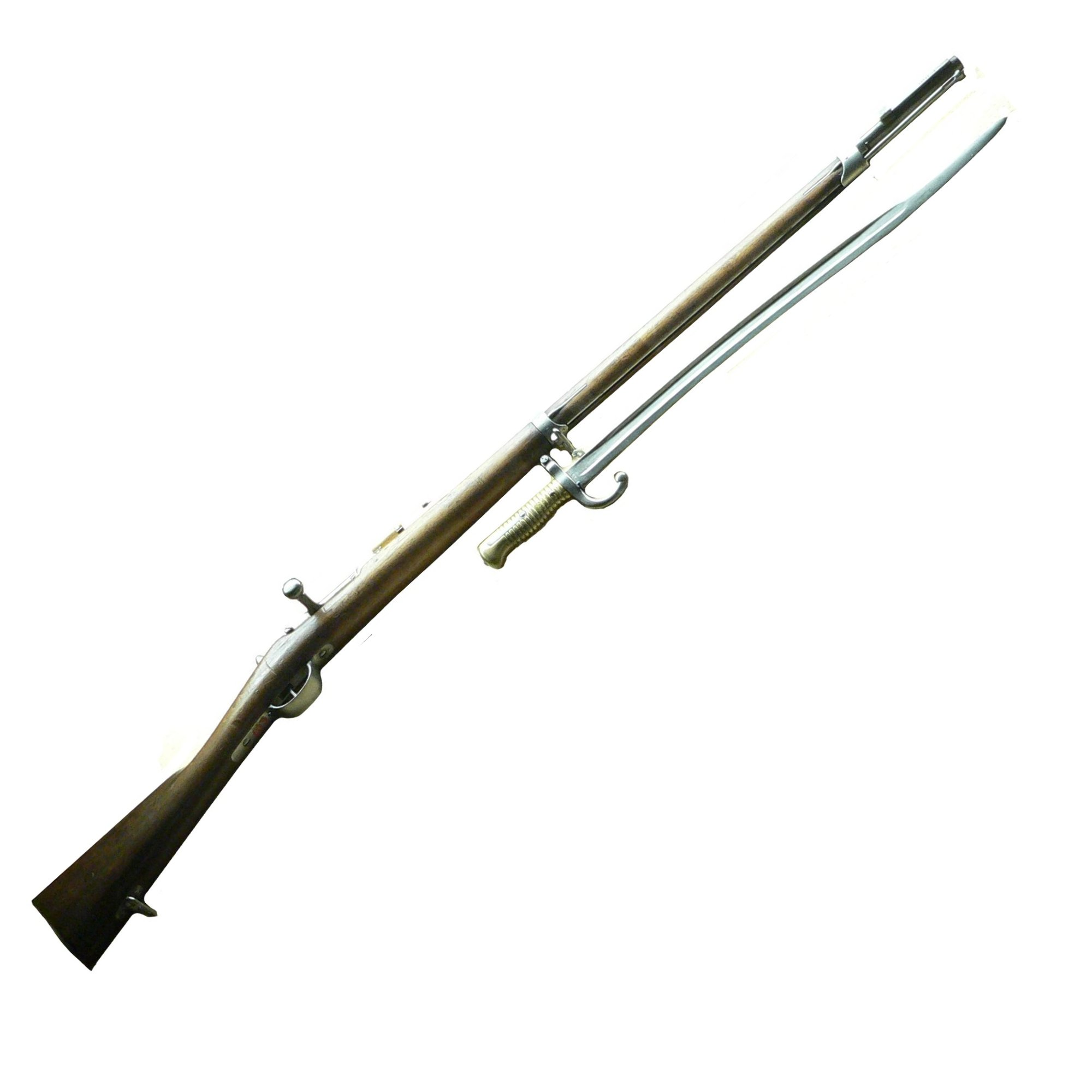
Chassepot 1866

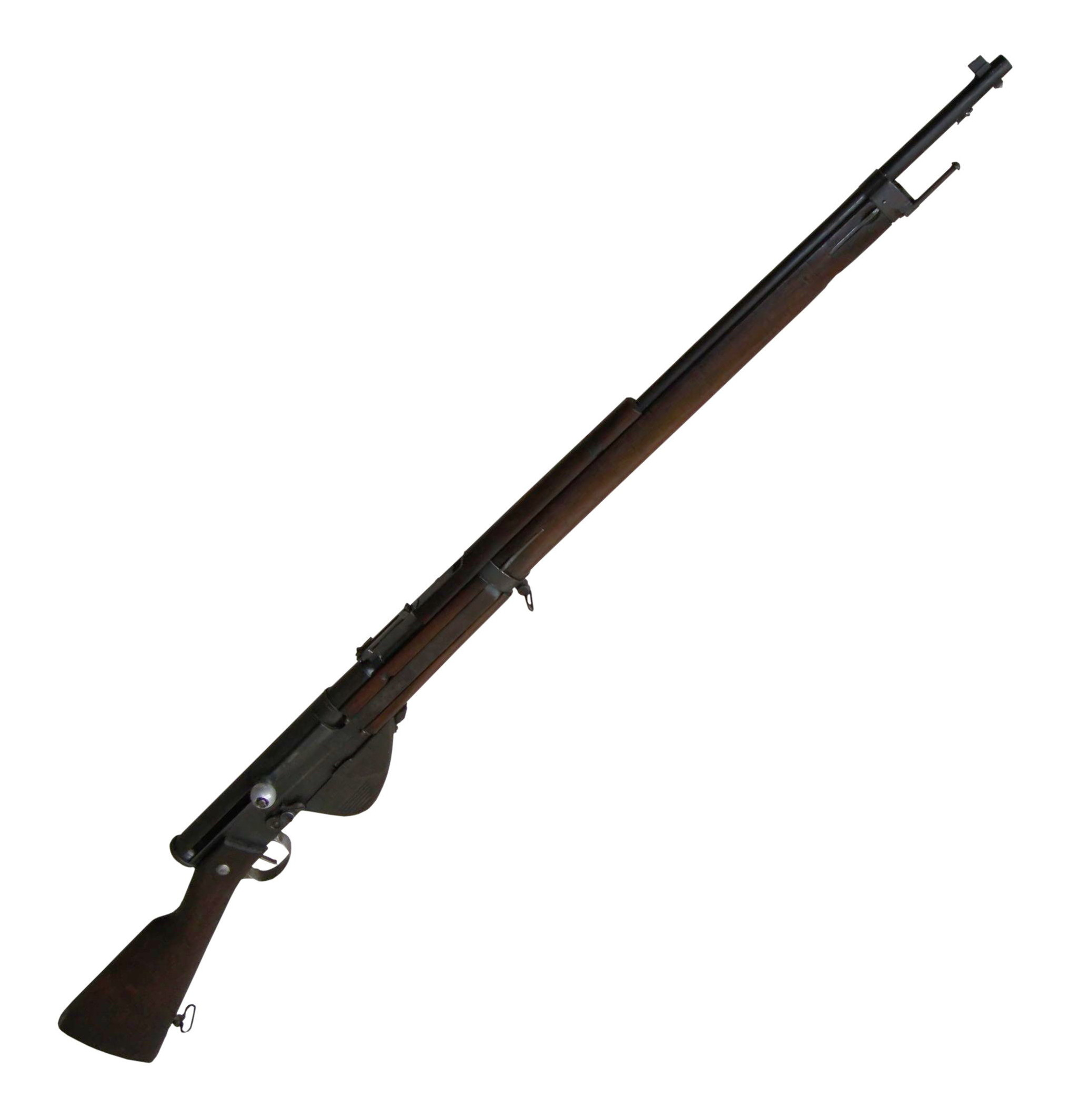
FSA-1917

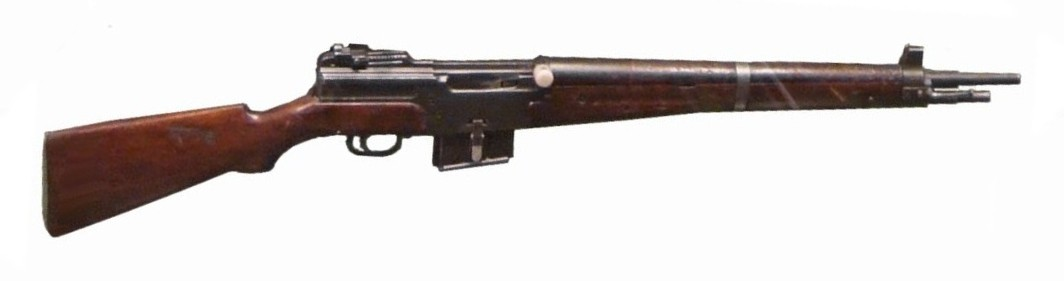
FSA MAS 49

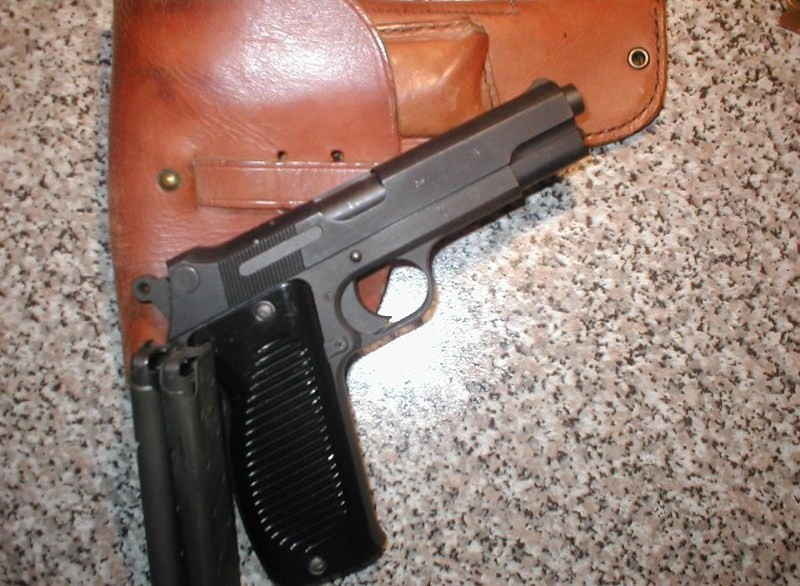
PA Modele 1950

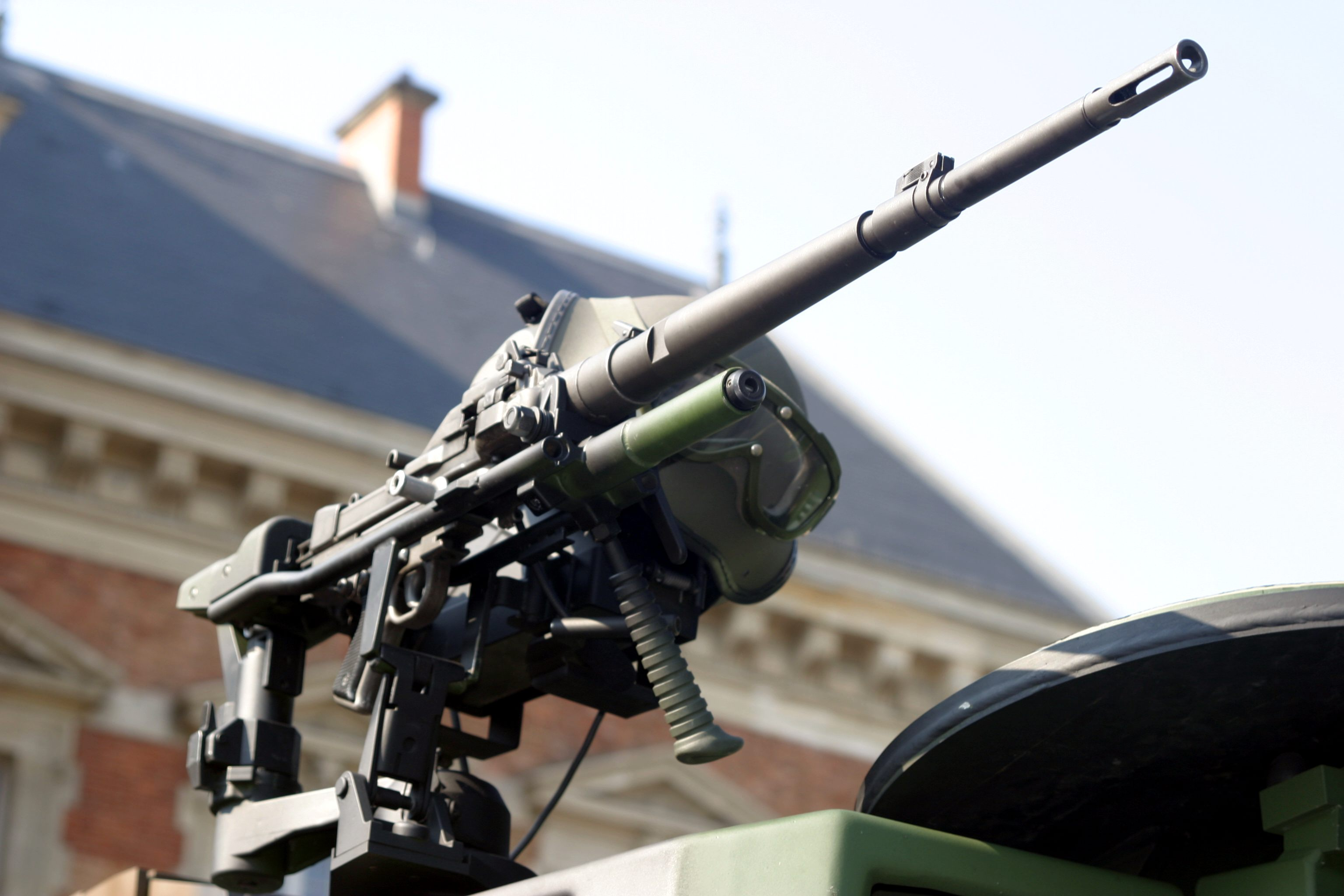
AA52 ANF1

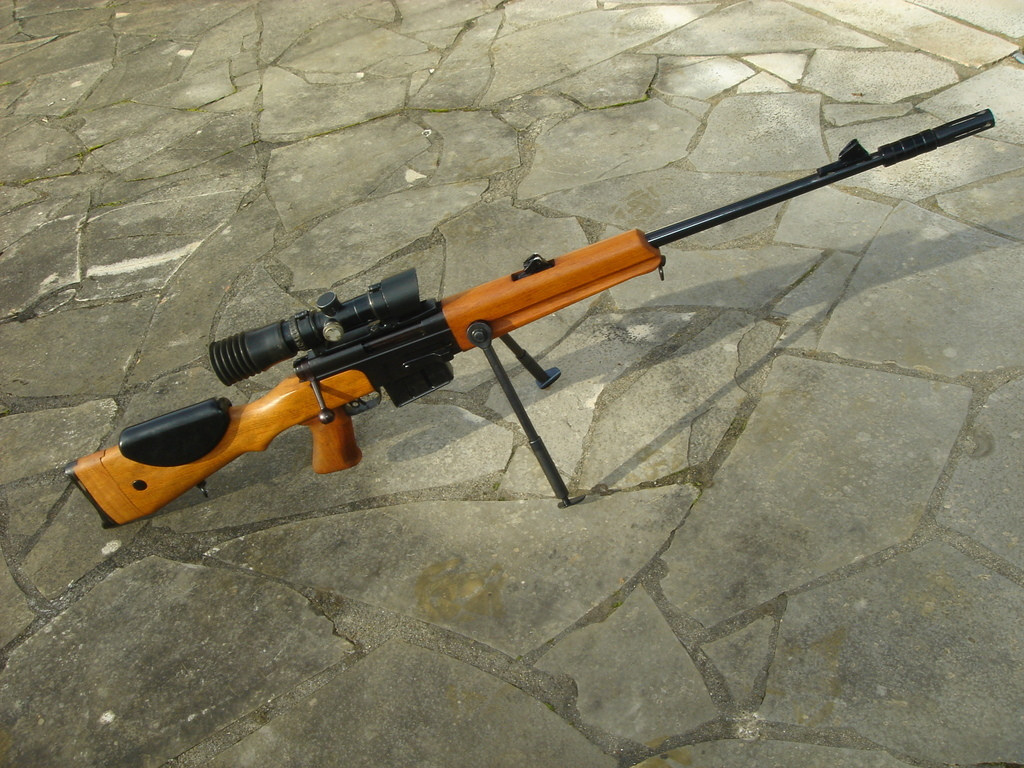
FR F1

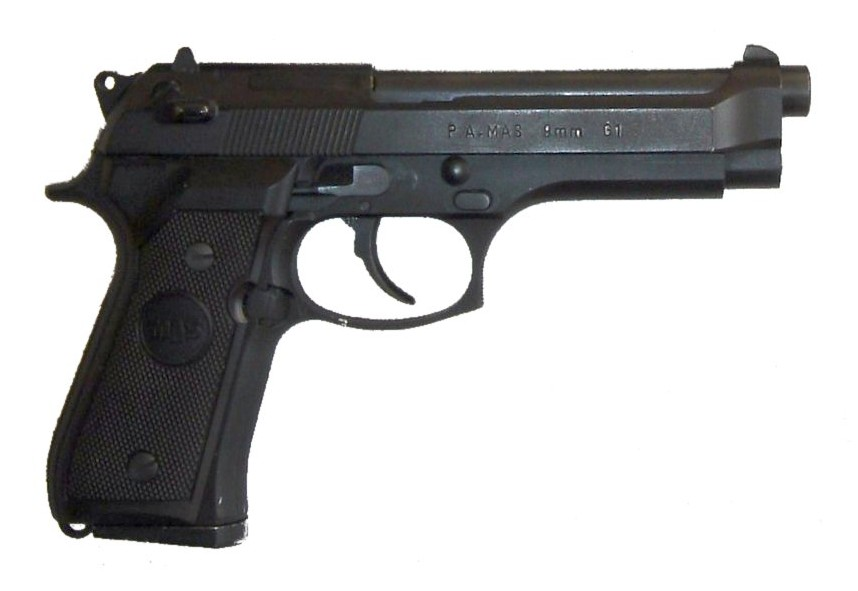
PA MAS G1

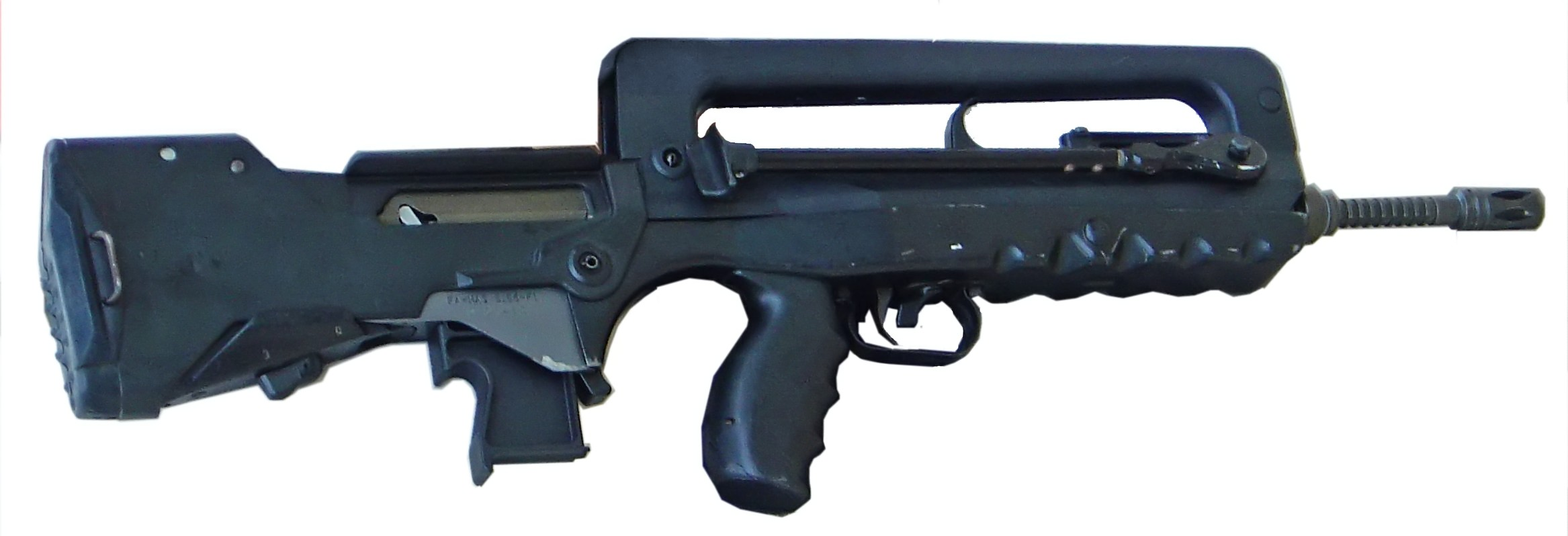
FA-MAS F1

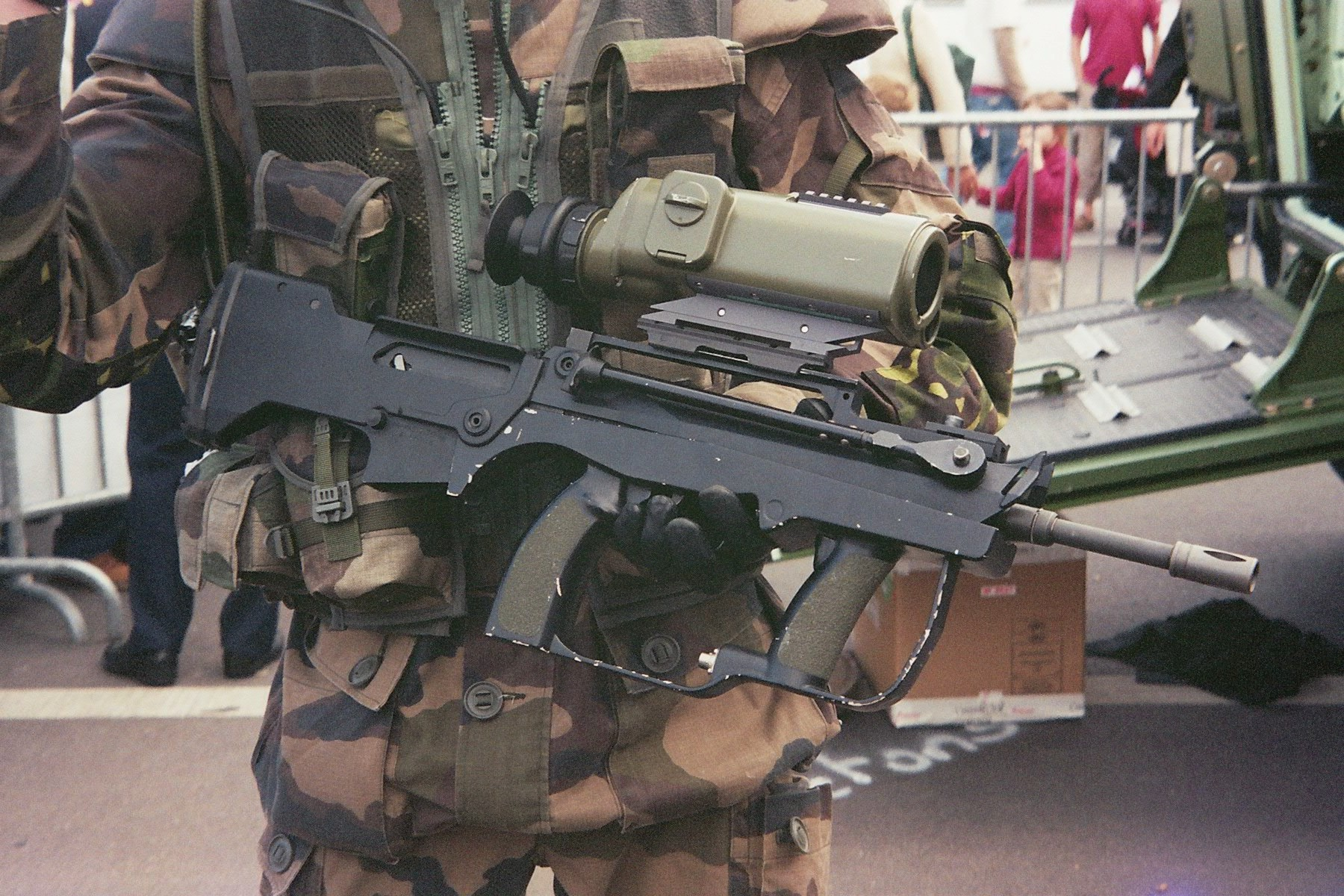
FAMAS G2 FélinV1 prototype

Note: Where a model's year is followed by "T" (e.g. M1822T), this is shorthand for transformé or 'transformed'. This typically means old models that had their ignition system modernised from flintlock to percussion cap, or had a smoothbore barrel re-bored with rifling. Bis means that the model had been modified twice.

- Pistolet modèle 1733
- Fusil d'infanterie de 17,5 mm modèle 1777
- Fusil d'infanterie de 17,5 mm modèle 1777 modifié an IX
- Pistolet de cavalerie de 17,1 mm modèle an IX
- Pistolet de 17,1 mm de cavalerie modèle an XIII
- Fusil d'infanterie de 17,5 mm modèle 1816
- Mousqueton de cavalerie modèle 1816
- Mousqueton de cavalerie modèle 1816C
- Mousqueton de cavalerie modèle 1822
- Fusil d'infanterie de 17,5 mm modèle 1822
- Fusil d'infanterie modèle 1822T
- Fusil d'infanterie de 18 mm modèle 1822T bis
- Fusil de rempart modèle 1828
- Fusil de rempart de 21,8 mm modèle 1831
- Fusil de voltigeur modèle 1842
- Fusil d'infanterie de 17,5 mm modèle 1842
- Fusil de marine modèle 1842 T
- Fusil de dragon modèle 1842 T
- Mousqueton de gendarmerie modèle 1842 T
- Fusil d'infanterie de 18 mm modèle 1842 T
- Carabine de Chasseurs a pied 1853
- Carabine de Chasseurs a pied 1853 T
- Fusil d'infanterie de 17,8 mm modèle 1857
- Fusil de marine modèle 1857
- Fusil de dragon modèle 1857
- Mousqueton de gendarmerie modèle 1857
- Fusil à tabatière système 1857
- fusil d'infanterie de 11 mm modèle 1866 Chassepot
- Revolver de 11 mm modèle 1873
- Revolver de 11 mm modèle 1874
- Fusil d'infanterie de 11 mm Gras modèle 1866-74
- Fusil d'infanterie de 11 mm Gras modèle 1874
- Fusil d'infanterie de 11 mm Gras modèle 1866-74 M80
- Fusil d'infanterie de 11 mm Gras modèle 1874 M80
- Fusil d'infanterie modèle 1874 M80 M14
- Fusil d'infanterie de 8 mm modèle 1886 Lebel
- Fusil d'infanterie de 8 mm modèle 1886/93, Lebel
- Fusil de 8 mm modèle 1886 M93 de tireur d'élite
- Mousqueton de cavalerie modèle 1890
- Carabine de cuirassier 1890
- Carabine de gendarmerie 1890
- Mousqueton d’artillerie modèle 1892
- Mousqueton d’artillerie modèle 1892 M16
- Revolver de 8 mm modèle 1892
- Canon de 75 Modèle 1897
- Fusil de 8 mm de tirailleurs indochinois modèle 1902, Berthier
- Fusil de 8 mm de tirailleurs sénégalais modèle 1907, Berthier
- Mitrailleuse St. Étienne modèle 1907
- Fusil d'infanterie de 8 mm modèle 07/15, Berthier
- Fusil d'infanterie de 8 mm modèle 07/15 M16, Berthier
- Fusil d'infanterie de 8 mm modèle 1916, Berthier
- Fusil Automatique modèle 1917
- Fusil semi automatique de 8 mm RSC modèle 1918
- Pistolet mitrailleur de 9 mm MAS modèle 1924
- Fusil d'infanterie de 7,5 mm modèle 07-15 M34
- Mousqueton d'artillerie de 8 mm modèle 1916
- Fusil d'infanterie de 7,5 mm modèle 1886 M93 M27
- Mousqueton de cavalerie de 8 mm modèle 1886 M93 R35
- Fusil d'infanterie de 7,5 mm modèle MAS 36
- Pistolet mitrailleur de 7,65 mm modèle 1938
- Pistolet automatique de 7,65 mm long modèle 1935 S
- Fusil de 7,5 mm modèle MAS 36 CR 39
- Fusil d'entraînement MAS 36 de 5,5mm (.22 LR)
- Fusil d'entraînement MAS 45 de 5,5mm (.22 LR)
- Carabine semi automatique de 5,5mm, 1946 (.22 LR)
- Fusil juxtaposé MAS calibre 12, 1946
- Carabine MAS 7×57mm, 1946
- Carabine MAS 10,75×68mm, 1946
- Carabine MAS 8×60mm, 1946
- Carabine MAS-Fournier 7×54mm, 1947
- Fusil semi automatique MAS 40
- Fusil semi automatique MAS 44
- Fusil semi automatique MAS 49
- Carabine Mitrailleuse de 7,65 mm MAS modèle 1948
- Carabine Mitrailleuse de 7,65 mm MAS modèle 1949
- Carabine Mitrailleuse de 7,62 mm MAS modèle 1949
- Carabine Mitrailleuse de 7,62 mm MAS modèle 1950
- Carabine Mitrailleuse de 7,62 mm MAS modèle 1951
- Pistolet mitrailleur de 9 mm MAS modèle 1948
- Fusil de 7,5mm modèle MAS 36 LG 48
- Fusil à répétition MAS modèle 36 modifié 51
- Pistolet automatique modèle 1950
- Fusil Automatique de 7,5 mm MAS modèle 1951
- Fusil Automatique de 7,5 mm MAS modèle 1952
- Arme Automatique modèle AA-52
- Arme Automatique modèle AA NF1 de 7,62 mm
- Fusil Automatique de 7,62 mm MAS modèle 1952
- Fusil Automatique de 7,5 mm MAS modèle 1952, Bullpup
- Fusil Automatique de 7,62 mm MAS modèle 1952
- Fusil Automatique de 7,62 mm MAS modèle 1953
- Fusil Automatique de 7,62 mm MAS modèle 1953, Bullpup
- Fusil Mitrailleur de 7,62 mm MAS modèle 1953
- Fusil Automatique MAS 54 A, B & C
- Fusil Automatique de 7,62 mm MAS modèle 1954
- Fusil Automatique de 7,62 mm MAS modèle 1954, Bullpup
- Fusil Mitrailleur de 7,62 mm MAS modèle 1954
- Fusil Automatique de 7,62 mm MAS modèle 1955
- Fusil Automatique de 7,62 mm MAS modèle 1955, Bullpup
- Fusil Automatique de 7,62 mm MAS modèle 1955
- Fusil Automatique de 7,62 mm MAS modèle 1956
- Fusil semi automatique MAS 49/56
- MAC-58
- Fusil Automatique de 7,62 mm MAS modèle 1958
- Fusil Automatique de 7,62 mm MAS A.P. modèle 1959
- Fusil Automatique de 7,62 mm MAS A.P. modèle 1959 type P.M
- Fusil Automatique de 7,62 mm MAS A.P. modèle 1959 type F.M
- Fusil Automatique de 7,62 mm MAS A.P. modèle 1960
- Fusil Automatique de 7,62 mm MAS A.P. modèle 1961
- Fusil Automatique de 7,62 mm MAS modèle T 62
- Fusil a répétition de précision FR-F1
- Fusil Automatique Heckler & Koch G3
- Fusil Automatique Heckler & Koch HK 33 F
- Fusil Automatique Tritube de 5,56mm
- Fusil a répétition de précision FR_F2
- Pistolet automatique MAS modèle G1
- Fusil d'entraînement FA MAS à plomb de 4,5mm (.177)
- Fusil semi automatique cal. 223 Remington, FA MAS
- Fusil semi automatique cal. 222 Remington, FA MAS
- Fusil automatique de 5,56 mm modèle F1, FA MAS
- Fusil automatique de 5,56 mm modèle G1, FA MAS
- Fusil automatique de 5,56 mm modèle G2, FA MAS
- Fusil automatique de 5,56 mm modèle FELIN V1, FA MAS
- Fusil automatique de 5,56 mm modèle FELIN V2, FA MAS
- PAPOP, Poly Arme, Poly Projectile, 35mm/ 5,56mm, French ACR
- Pistolet mitrailleur de 9 mm HK MP5 F

== See also ==
- Manufacture d'armes de Châtellerault
- Manufacture Nationale d'Armes de Tulle

== Sources ==
- Danel, Raymond and Cuny, Jean. L'aviation française de bombardement et de renseignement (1918/1940), Docavia n°12, Editions Larivière.
- De Vries, G. and Martens, B.J. The MKb 42, MP43, MP44 and the Sturmgewehr 44, Propaganda Photo Series, Volume IV, Special Interest Publicaties BV, Arnhem, The Netherlands, First Edition, 2001.
- Ezell, Edward Clinton. Small Arms of the World, Arms & Armour Press, London, 1977, Eleventh edition.
- Ferrard, Stéphane. France 1940 l'armement terrestre, ETAI, 1998. ISBN 2-7268-8380-X
- Gotz, Hans Dieter. German Military Rifles and Machine Pistols, 1871-1945, Schiffer Publishing, West Chester, Pennsylvania, 1990. OCLC 24416255
- Huon, Jean. Les fusils d'assaut français, Editions Barnett, 1998. ISBN 2-9508308-6-2.
- Pelletier, Alain. French Fighters of World War II, Squadron/Signal Publications, Inc., Carrollton, Texas, 2002. ISBN 0-89747-440-6
- Smith, W.H.B. Small Arms of the World: The Basic Manual of Military Small Arms, Stackpole Books, Harrisburg, Pa., 1955. OCLC 3773343
- Wollert, Günter; Lidschun, Reiner; Kopenhagen, Wilfried. Illustrierte Enzyklopädie der Schützenwaffen aus aller Welt: Schützenwaffen heute (1945–1985), Militärverlag der Deutschen Demokratischen Republik, Berlin, 1988. OCLC 19630248
- Deutsches Waffen Journal
- Visier
- Schweizer Waffen Magazin
- Internationales Waffen Magazin
- Cibles
- AMI
- Gazette des Armes
- Action Guns
- Guns & Ammo
- American Handgunner
- SWAT Magazine
- Diana Armi
- Armi & Tiro

== Notes ==
1. "French autoloading rifles. 1898-1979 (Proud promise), by Jean Huon, 1995, Collector Grade Publications. ISBN 0-88935-186-4. This volume (in English)contains a detailed technical chapter describing the Lebel rifle and its ammunition. This volume primarily describes all French semi-automatic rifles since 1898, notably the Mle 1917 and Mle 1918 semi-automatic rifles, the Meunier (A6) rifle as well as the MAS 38-40 to MAS49 and 49/56 series.
2. "La Manufacture Nationale d'Armes de Châtellerault(1819-1968)", Claude Lombard, 1987, Brissaud,162 Grande Rue, Poitiers, ISBN 2-902170-55-6. This illustrated volume (in French) contains the production statistics for the Lebel rifle as well as complete technical accounts on the Gras, Kropatschek, Lebel and Berthier weapons and how they came to be designed and manufactured. This is regarded as the fundamental research volume on the subject. The author is a retired armament engineer who spent most of his career at Châtellerault and had full access to all the archives and the prototypes.
3. "Military rifle and machine gun cartridges", Jean Huon, 1988, Ironside International Publishers, Alexandria, VA, ISBN 0-935554-05-X. This volume (in English) provides a detailed description of all the types of 8 mm Lebel ammunition, including the Balle D (a.m.). The 7 X 59 mm Meunier cartridge (for the semi-automatic A6 Meunier rifle) is also illustrated and described in detail.
4. "Standard Catalog of Military Firearms", Ned Schwing, 2003, Krause Publications, ISBN 0-87349-525-X. Contains an informative and detailed page dedicated to the Lebel rifle (by David Fortier).
5. "The Chauchat Machine Rifle (Honour Bound) , Gerard Demaison and Yves Buffetaut, 1995, Collector Grade Publications, ISBN 0-88935-190-2, The 10 pages illustrated appendix at the end of this volume (in English) exhaustively describes all the 8 mm Lebel ball ammunition types, plus the less well-known blank, tracer, armor-piercing, incendiary, dummy and proof rounds. This appendix was documented and authored by internationally known cartridge expert Dr Ph. Regenstreif.
6. Bolt Action Rifles, Frank de Haas and Wayne Van Zwoll, 2003, Krause Publications, ISBN 0-87349-660-4. An illustrated chapter in this volume reviews in depth the Lebel and Berthier rifles (and carbines).
