= Voltigeur =

French military skirmish units

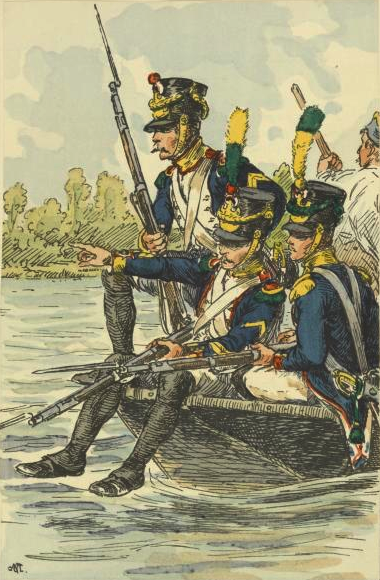
French voltigeurs crossing the Danube before the battle of Wagram

The Voltigeurs were French military skirmish units created in 1804 by Emperor Napoleon I. They replaced the second company of fusiliers in each existing infantry battalion. The voltigeurs moniker later saw use with other militaries.

== Etymology ==
Voltigeurs (Note: pronounced [vɔltiʒœʀ]) (English: "vaulters") were named after their originally conceived mode of operation: although they were foot soldiers, on the battlefield they were intended to jump onto the croup of cavalry horses to advance more quickly. This proved unworkable and they were trained to be elite skirmishers, but they retained their original name. Voltigeurs formed an integral part of the Grande Armée's basic building blocks, the line and light infantry battalions.

== Line and light infantry voltigeurs ==
In 1804, each French Line (Ligne) and Light (Légère) infantry battalion was ordered to create one company of ninety of the best shots who would serve as elite skirmishers. The voltigeurs were skilled at sharpshooting and received specific training in marksmanship, using cover and taking the initiative.

Like the grenadiers, this company would frequently be detached from the battalion to perform specialised light infantry tasks—operating in loose formation, forming the skirmish line and screening the battalion from the enemy. The formation instruction for voltigeurs gave no indication where they were supposed to stand in the battle line.

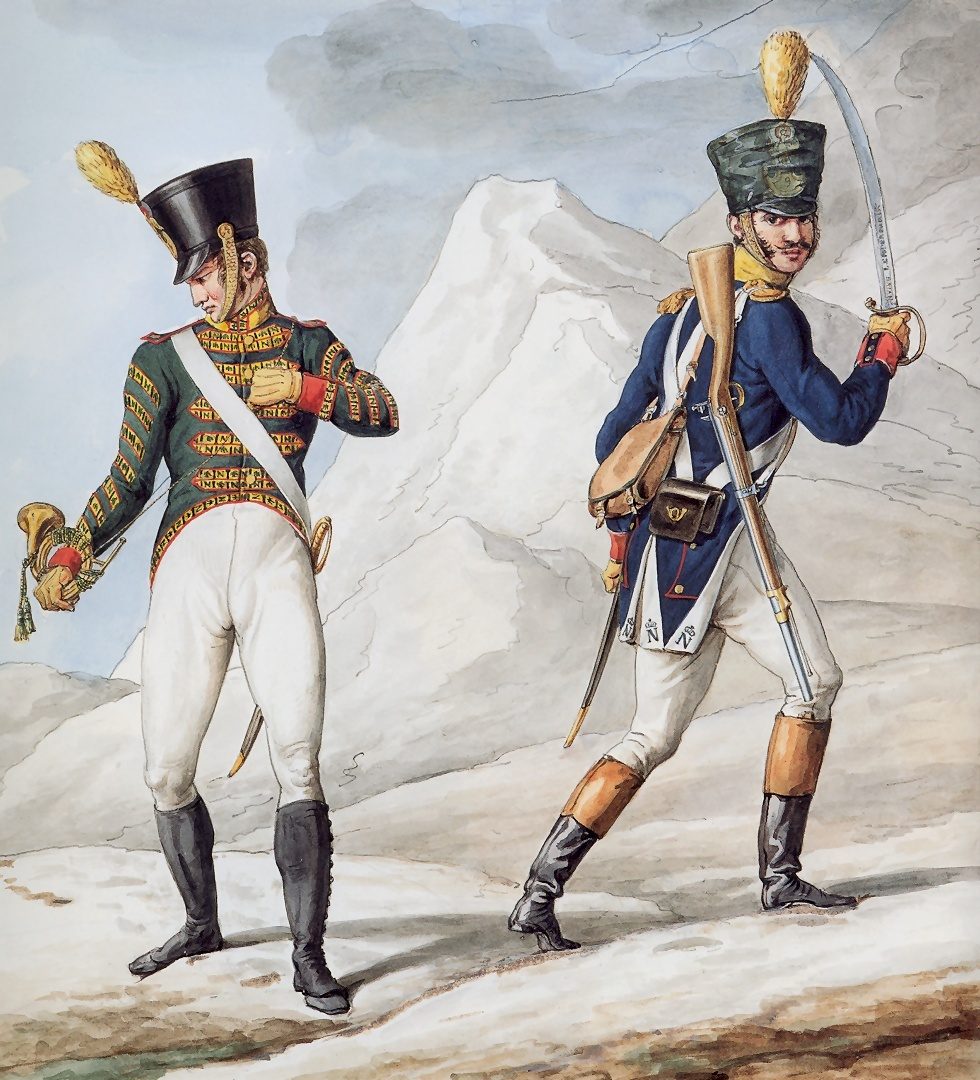
Cornet in imperial livery and officer of the line voltigeurs (1812)

Although the original concept of skirmishers using cavalry to transport them during battle quickly proved unworkable in any large scale, voltigeurs did on occasion ride with French dragoons to battle, as recalled by a British officer on the harrowing retreat of John Moore's army prior to the Battle of Corunna.

The French had much the advantage of us in these petty warfares, for I have frequently seen their light troops mounted behind their dragoons, so that when they came to a favourable place to make an attack, these fellows dismounted quite fresh, and our light troops who had been always marching, had to oppose them; still we managed to beat them off.

With the reorganization of 1807 the voltigeur company was enlarged to 121 men. When the battalion was formed up in line formation, the voltigeurs took their place on the left of the line, the second most prestigious position. The top position, the right, was occupied by the battalion's grenadier company.

The French voltigeurs suffered huge losses during the 1812 Russian campaign. One account described how they were decimated by the combined forces of Russian artillery and cuirassiers after bearing the brunt of cavalry charges. After this period, the quality of the French voltigeurs declined as the new units lacked the experience and training to set them apart from their "non-elite" compatriots in the regular light infantry chasseur companies. The hastily reformed regiments of 1813, numbering up to 19, were not up to the same standard as the elite units of the Voltigeurs before the Russian campaign. Despite this, the Voltigeurs of the Guard performed admirably in the 1813–1814 campaigns.

=== Uniform ===
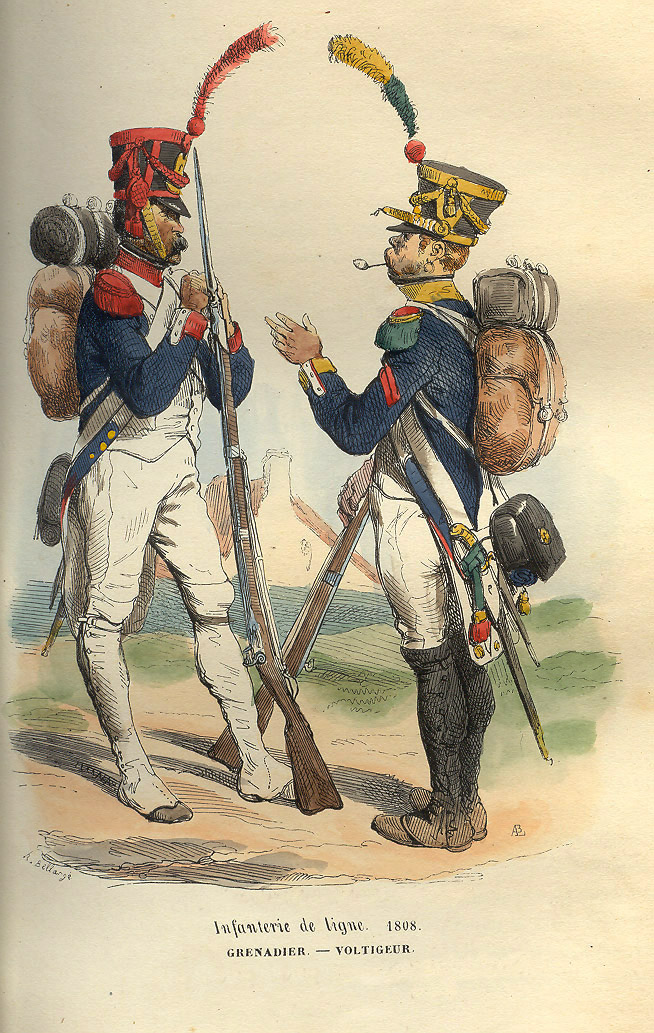
French line infantry grenadier (left) and voltigeur (right) c. 1808

The uniform was made of a blue coat with yellow collar and cuffs piped red, red and green epaulettes with a yellow crescent, and yellow bugle horns on the turnbacks. From 1804, they wore shakos, but some had bicorne hats with green pompoms and a yellow brush. By 1807, all Voltigeurs had a shako which could be plain black, and have a yellow top or bottom band, or have yellow chevrons, green cords, and an all-green plume or a green plume with a yellow tip. Line voltigeurs had white trousers and lapels, while light voltigeurs had blue trousers and lapels.

== Voltigeurs of the Guard ==
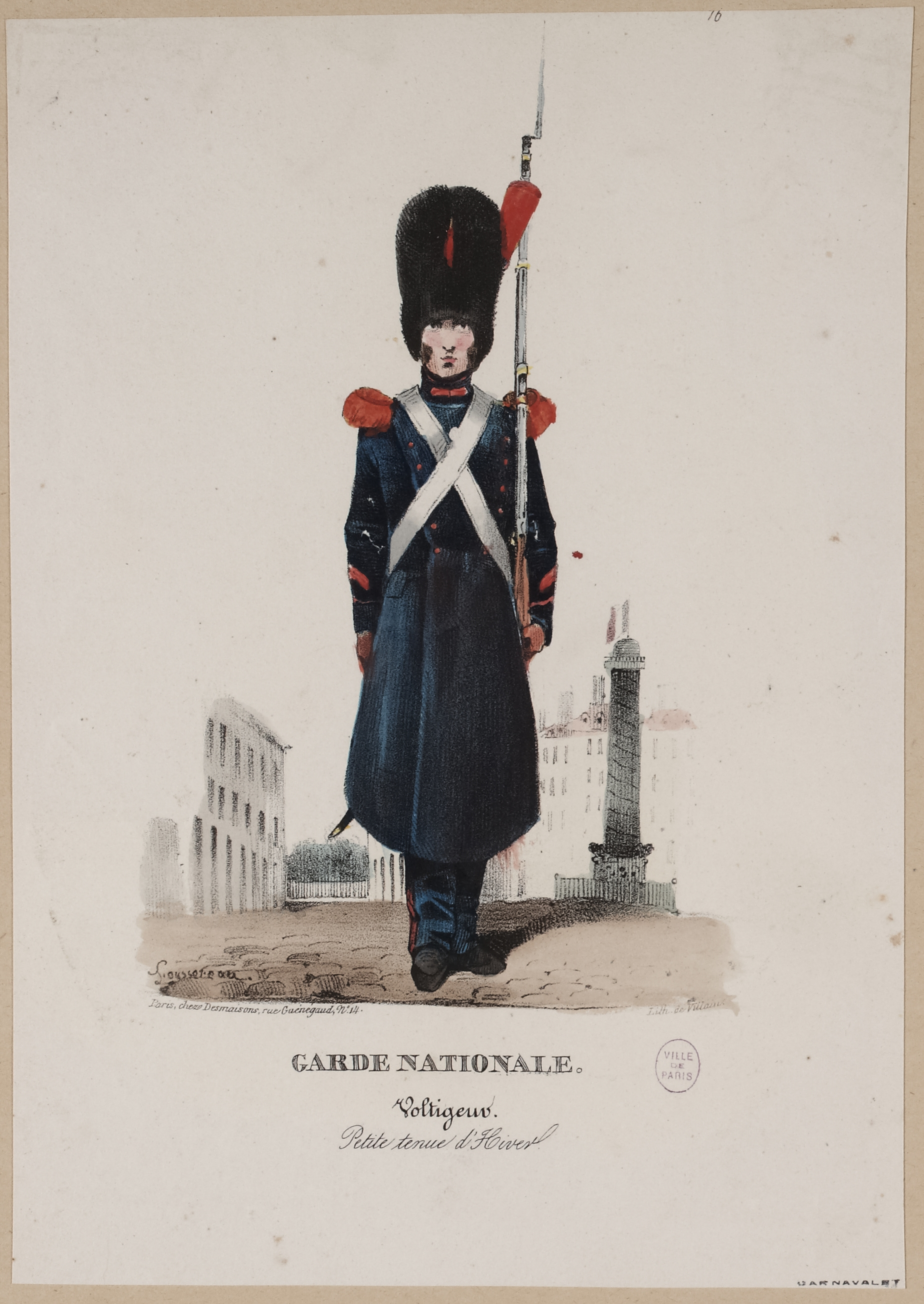
A voltigeur with the Garde Nationale, 1809

In 1809, the French Imperial Guard's corps of Chasseurs formed the Tirailleurs-Chasseurs and Conscrit-Chasseurs regiments, part of the Young Guard. In 1811, these units were renamed Voltigeurs, forming the 1–4th regiments. The Voltigeurs of the Guard, along with their sister regiments the Tirailleurs (formerly the Tirailleurs-Grenadiers and Conscrit-Grenadiers regiments), provided the skirmish screen for the Chasseurs and Grenadiers of Napoleon's Old Guard.

During the Battle of Waterloo the Voltigeurs, along with the Tirailleurs, conducted a tenacious defence of the town of Plancenoit against a major Prussian flanking attack. Despite being heavily outnumbered, the Young Guard, reinforced by some battalions of Old Guard Grenadiers, held the town until the defeat of the Middle Guard attack on the allied centre caused the army to collapse.

After the abdication of Napoleon and the Second Restoration of the Bourbon kings, the surviving regiments of Voltigeurs, along with the remnants of the entire Imperial Guard, were disbanded.

== Weapons and known equipment ==
- Carabine de Versailles An XII rifle (issued to officers, sergeants and quartermasters)
- Fusil de Dragon – Dragoon version of the Charleville musket (some examples of the 'Fusil de Marine', or naval version, may have also been used)
- Model 1717 Charleville musket
- Pistolet modèle An IX
- Pistolet modèle An XIII

== In French-allied states ==
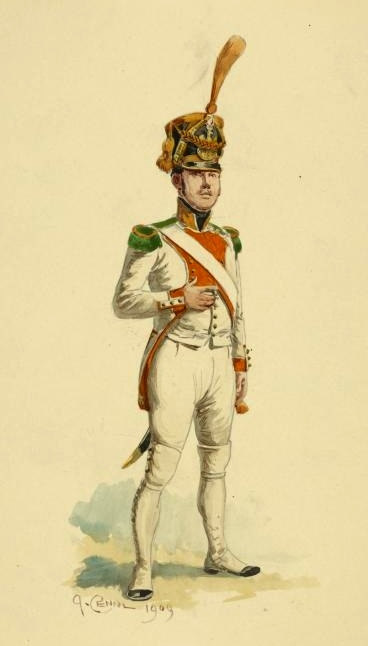
A voltigeur from the French-client state Kingdom of Naples

Several Napoleonic French allies based their battalion formation on that of the French and had voltigeur companies in their battalions. The allies using the French battalion system included the following:

- The Grand Duchy of Baden
- The Duchy of Warsaw
- The Kingdom of Bavaria (after 1810)
- The Kingdom of Holland
- The Kingdom of Italy
- The Kingdom of Naples
- The Kingdom of Saxony (after 1809)
- The Kingdom of Westphalia
- The Kingdom of Württemberg
- Several minor states from the Rhine Confederation

== Outside the First French Empire ==
=== Second French Empire ===
In 1854 Napoleon III recreated the Imperial Guard of his uncle. This included a Voltigeur Brigade of two regiments, expanded to two brigades by 1857. Drawn from experienced men with good records in the line infantry, the Voltigeur regiments of the Imperial Guard served with distinction in the Crimean and Italian campaigns. In the Franco-Prussian War of 1870 they saw only limited action before the surrender of the main imperial field army at Metz. The surviving depot companies of the Voltigeur regiments were then incorporated into the provisional regiments de marche of the Republican forces.

=== Belgium ===
The Jägers te Paard Battalion is a mounted reconnaissance unit. Its A and B Squadrons have a voltigeurs platoon for dismounted reconnaissance.

=== Canada ===
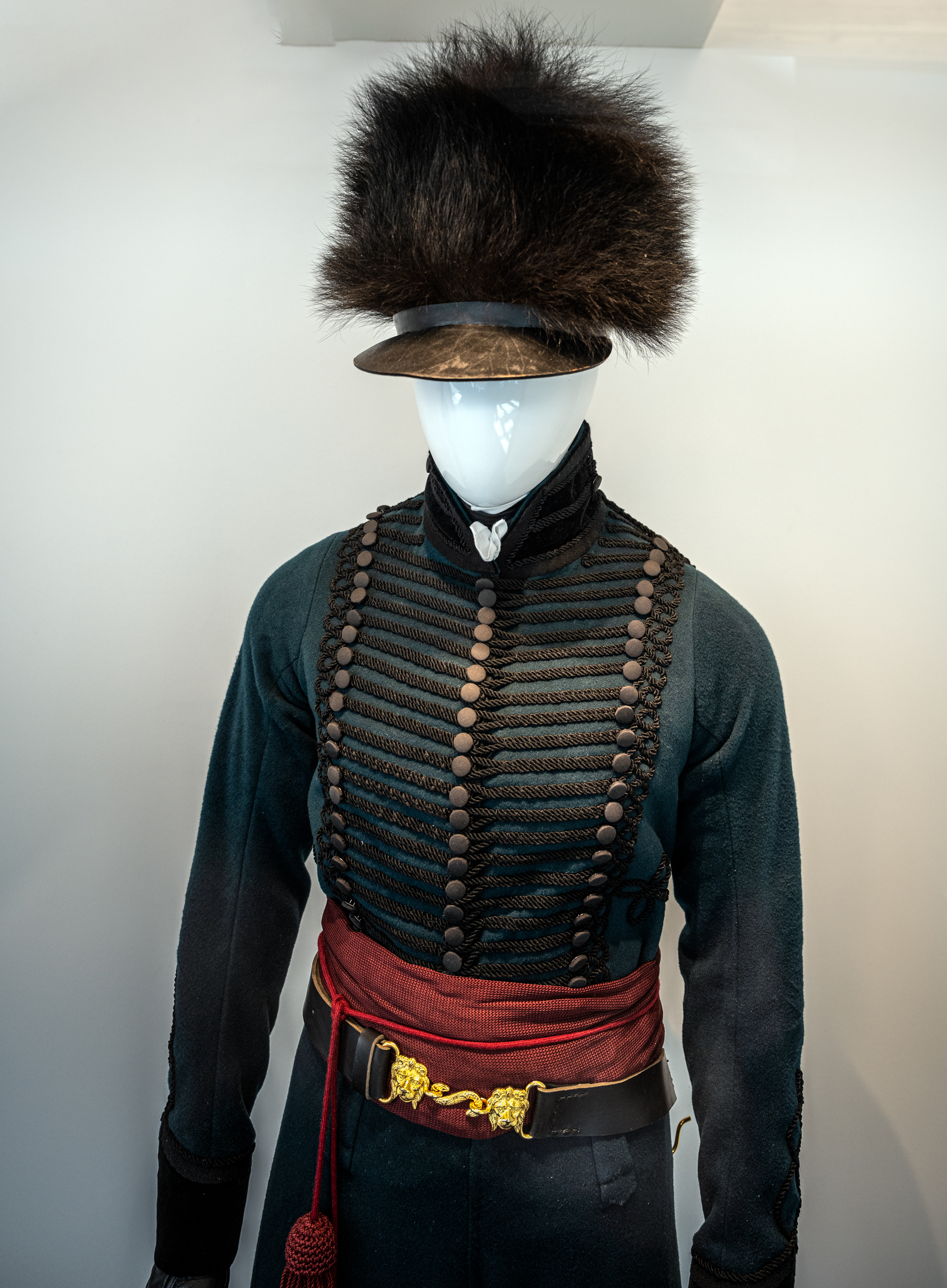
Uniform of the Canadian Voltigeurs

During the War of 1812, George Prevost, the governor general of the Canadas, formed the Volunteer Provincial Corps of Light Infantry or the Voltiguers Canadien. The unit's function was similar to other Canadian Fencibles raised during the conflict, although more specialized in skirmishing and scouting operations. The unit was established on 15 April 1812 and was led by Charles de Salaberry. It remained in service until shortly after the war on 15 March 1815.

On the west coast, Governor James Douglas formed the Victoria Voltigeurs in 1851 after there had been troublesome disputes with the Americans over the San Juan Islands. The Voltigeurs were part Metis and part French-Canadian, presumably recruited from Hudson's Bay Company canoe paddlers.

In 1862, the Canadian Militia formed the Voltigeurs de Québec rifle regiment, the first French-Canadian regiment in the Active Militia. The unit's first commander was Charles-René-Léonidas d'Irumberry de Salaberry, the son of Charles de Salaberry. The unit continues to be maintained as a Canadian Army Reserve and perpetuates the lineage of the Voltiguers Canadien. As a result of this perpetuation, the unit carries the battle honour, "Defence of Canada – 1812-1815", in honour of the Canadian Voltiguers wartime efforts.

=== United States ===
In addition, the United States organized a "Regiment of Voltigeurs and Foot Riflemen" (1847–1848) for service in the Mexican–American War. Like its French counterpart, the American voltigeur was composed of light infantry trained to fight either in conventional formations or spread out into skirmish lines.

== See also ==
- Chasseur
- Grande Armée
- Grenz infantry
- Jäger (military)
- Light infantry
- Skirmisher
