= Pistoleer =

Mounted soldier who uses a pistol

English Horse Pistol a.k.a. Tower Land Pattern Pistol
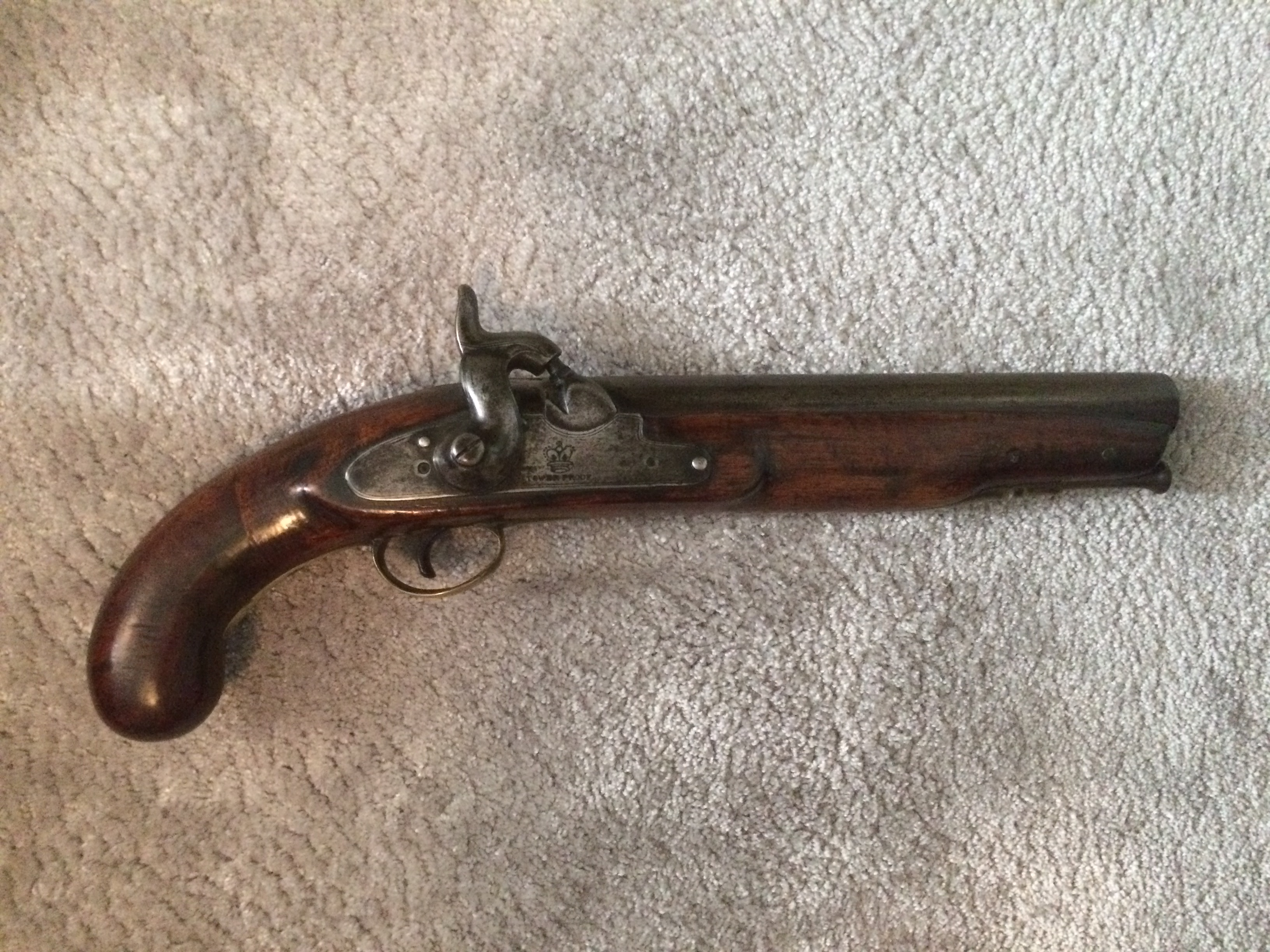
- George III cavalry pistol converted from flintlock to caplock
- Type: Pistol
- Place of origin: England

Service history
- In service: British Empire (1722–1860)
- Used by: British Army, British East India Company, Hudson's Bay Company, Mexican army, Texian Army, Confederate States of America
- Wars: Seven Years' War, American War of Independence, French Revolutionary Wars, Napoleonic Wars, War of 1812, First Anglo-Maratha War, Second Anglo-Maratha War, Third Anglo-Maratha War, Anglo-Burmese War, Black War, Opium Wars, New Zealand Wars, Anglo-Afghan War, US-Mexican War, Crimean War, Indian Mutiny, American Civil War

Production history
- Designed: 1722
- Manufacturer: Royal Armouries, Tower of London
- Produced: 1722–1856
- Variants: Tower pistol Model 1738, Model 1764, Model 1795, Model 1835, Model 1840, Sea Service pistol Indian Pattern pistol Model 1787, Model 1796, Model 1802, Model 1813, Model 1832, Model 1856

Specifications
- Cartridge: Paper cartridge, musket ball undersized to reduce the effects of powder fouling
- Calibre: .71 in (18 mm)
- Barrels: Smoothbore
- Action: Flintlock
- Rate of fire: User dependent; usually 3 to 4 rounds per minute
- Muzzle velocity: Variable
- Effective firing range: 50 yd (46 m)
- Maximum firing range: Up to 75 yards (69 m)
- Feed system: Muzzle-loaded, Single-shot
- Sights: Fore-sights

A pistoleer is a mounted soldier trained to use a pistol, or more generally anyone armed with such a weapon. It is derived from pistolier, a French word for an expert marksman.

== History ==
The earliest kind of pistoleer was the mounted German Reiter, who came to prominence in Europe after the Battle of St. Quentin in 1557. These soldiers were equipped with a number of single-shot, muzzle-loader wheel-lock or Snaphance horse pistols, amongst the most advanced weapons of the era. Although mounted Pistoleers were effective against heavy cavalry, they gradually fell out of use during the Thirty Years War. After this time, cavalry in Western armies used swords or lances as their primary arm, although they still generally carried a pistol as a sidearm.

During the English Civil War, the Roundhead Ironside cavalry were issued with a pair of flintlock pistols. Cavaliers used similar weapons, often ornately decorated, including an early breechloader with a barrel that could be unscrewed.

Before 1700, cavalrymen were recruited from the wealthy gentry, and generally purchased their own nonstandard pistols. The Industrial Revolution enabled armies to mass-produce firearms with interchangeable parts, and cheaply issue large quantities of standardised firearms to enlisted personnel. However, officers in the British Army and Royal Navy continued to privately commission pistols from London gunsmiths such as Joseph Manton, Robert Wogdon, Henry Nock and Durs Egg until the mid 19th century.

== Equipment ==
Light cavalry of the early modern period were equipped with a sabre and specialised horse pistols, carried in saddle holsters. These large calibre single shot handguns, also known as holster pistols, horsemen's pistols, cavalry pistols, or musket calibre pistols, saw extensive use among the British and French armies during the Napoleonic Wars. These were deadliest at close range, but massed pistol fire from horseback proved moderately effective at medium range. Many were made in .71, .65 and .58 calibre, to enable the use of standard infantry musket balls.

During the early Victorian era, most horse pistols in the arsenals of England, France, and the United States were converted to caplock ignition. These remained in service until .44 calibre revolvers such as the Colt Dragoon of 1847 or the Adams revolver of 1851 were introduced.

=== British horse pistol ===
Horse pistols made at the Tower of London used the same lock as the Brown Bess musket. Pistols made before 1790 had wooden ramrods, instead of steel ramrods. The lock was stamped with the crown of George III of Great Britain and the barrel received arrow proof marks.

Due to the high demand for arms during the wars against France, regulation .71 calibre horse pistols were also manufactured in Birmingham, and by private gunsmiths. Britain's German allies produced similar pistols in .71 and .65 calibre, including the Prussian Potzdam horse pistols of 1733, 1774 and 1789.

British light cavalry such as the hussars fought as pistoliers during the Napoleonic Wars, being trained to draw and fire both pistols before closing in with the sabre. Dragoons were issued with a pair, or brace, of pistols as secondary weapons to their carbines. Although designed for use by cavalry, horse pistols were also issued to mounted staff officers for personal defence, and it was a widespread if unauthorised practice for colour sergeants to carry a pistol in addition to the half-pike and spadroon. After the war, surplus horse pistols were issued to the coast guard, customs officers, and the Metropolitan mounted police.

Similar weapons, issued to the Royal Navy as the Sea Service pistol, had brass rather than steel barrels to prevent corrosion, a belt hook, and a brass butt cap for close quarters fighting. Blackbeard the pirate was infamous for carrying seven pistols of this type in a bandolier.

=== India pattern pistol ===
An improved variant of the regulation .71 Tower horse pistol, known as the Indian pattern, was manufactured in British India from 1787 to 1832, for use by officers of the East India Trading Company and British Indian Cavalry. Indian or New Land Pattern pistols produced after 1802 had captive ramrods, raised waterproof frizzens for use in India's monsoons, and an attachment on the buttcap for a lanyard. These features would later be retro-fitted to the Tower Model 1835 and Model 1840 pistols.

Indian horse pistols in .65 and later .577 calibre were produced at British-controlled arsenals such as Lucknow from 1796 to 1856, and were favoured by big game hunters before the invention of the double barreled howdah pistol. Additionally, many were exported to England and saw use during the later years of the Napoleonic Wars. During the Indian Mutiny, caplock conversions of the India pattern pistol with rifled barrels were used by British forces and mutinous sepoys alike.

=== French and American horse pistols ===
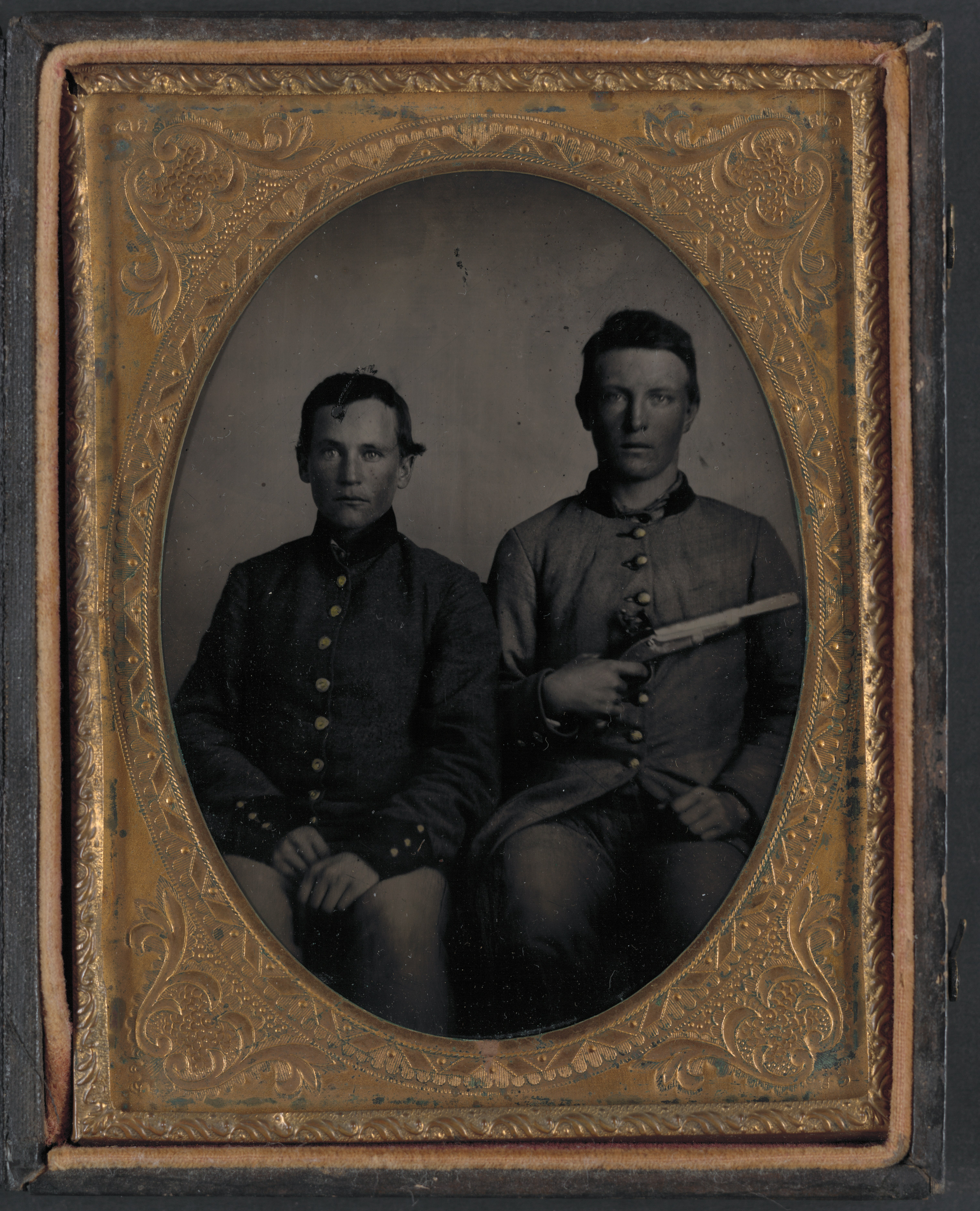
Confederate States of America soldier armed with Harpers Ferry pistol

The French army first issued horse pistols to their cavalry in 1733, with an improved model introduced in 1764. French horse pistols were used primarily by cuirassiers, and as a secondary weapon by lancers. During the Napoleonic Wars, the most commonly issued pistols were the Pistolet Modele An. IX of 1798, and the Pistolet Modele An. XIII in service from 1806 to 1840. The latter was half-stocked, had a bird's head grip, and included an attachment for a lanyard. An improved model was introduced in 1822, and was converted to caplock ignition in 1842. Copies of the French An. XIII pistol were manufactured in Holland, Belgium, Switzerland and Prussia and were issued to the armies of those countries from the 1820s onwards.

During the Revolutionary War the Americans manufactured copies of the British horse pistol, and its likely that the 1804–1806 Lewis and Clark Expedition procured horsemen's pistols of this type. British and American horse pistols were also acquired by indigenous American warriors either from dead white men, or through trade.

While mounted horse pistols were historically part of cavalry equipment, specific details regarding their deployment during the Texas Revolution remain limited and intricate.

The Americans manufactured their first standardised horse pistol at Harpers Ferry in 1805, copied from the French An. IX pattern. Improved models of the Harpers Ferry pistol were produced in 1806, 1807, 1812, 1818, and 1835. These were issued to the US Army during the War of 1812, Indian Wars and Mexican War, and were used by gunfighters, fur trappers, and mountain men in the early days of the Old West, including Kit Carson. The US Navy used similar pistols from 1813 until after the American Civil War, and the Confederate army issued large quantities of Harpers Ferry horse pistols.

=== Russian horse pistols ===
The hussars of the Tsarist army filled a similar role to their British counterparts, being trained to fight with sword and pistol. Before the standardised Model 1808 horse pistol in 7 Line (.71-inch) caliber was introduced, the Tsarist cavalry were equipped with a mixture of weapons in different calibers, some made before 1700. The Model 1808 pistol was full-stocked, with a brass barrel band, belt hook and the initials of Tsar Alexander I stamped on the buttplate. New pistols were manufactured at Tula, Izhevsk, Sestroretsk, Moscow, Saint Petersburg, and Kiev in 1818, 1824 and 1836, and most older weapons were converted to percussion from 1844 to 1848. Many were painted black as thermal insulation from the Russian winter, and leather wrapped grips were not uncommon.

Ukrainian Cossacks were equipped with their own distinctive horse pistol, featuring a miquelet lock imported from Spain or Italy, a stock carved from an elm root, a bulbous ivory or bone butt, and niello silver decoration. These were in use among the Cossacks, Chechens, Georgians, Abkhazians and other inhabitants of the Caucasus from the Russo Turkish Wars of the 17th century until after the Crimean War.

Some Cossack tribes of the early 1800s scorned the pistol as the weapon of an inexperienced recruit or coward, but others celebrated the skilled pistoleers and assigned the best marksmen to elite companies of dismounted skirmishers. By the 1840s, it had become mandatory for every Ukrainian youth to be as competent in the use of the pistol and carbine as he was with the sabre, lance, wolf hunting, and horse-breaking. Unlike regular cavalry, Cossacks carried their pistols on the left side of their belt or around their neck rather than in a saddle holster so they would never be unarmed if attacked while away from their horses.

== Revival ==
Horse-mounted pistoleers of a kind, made a brief comeback in North America during the American Civil War (particularly by the Confederate Army), as well as in the Indian Wars of the 1860s and 1870s. This was a consequence of the adoption of the multi-shot Colt revolver, which gave horsemen greater range and firepower.

== Gallery ==
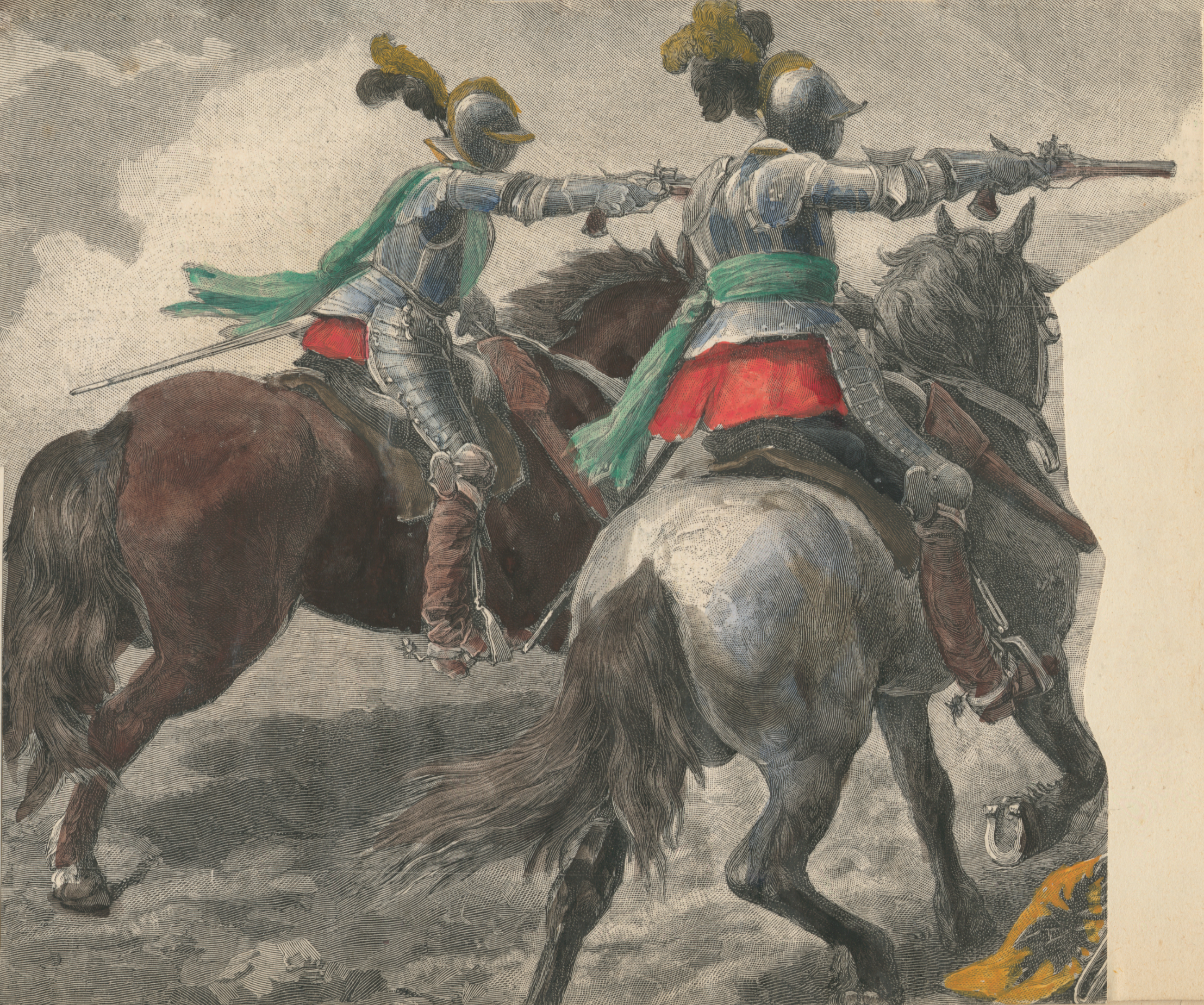
Cuirassiers of the early 1600s armed with wheellock horse pistols

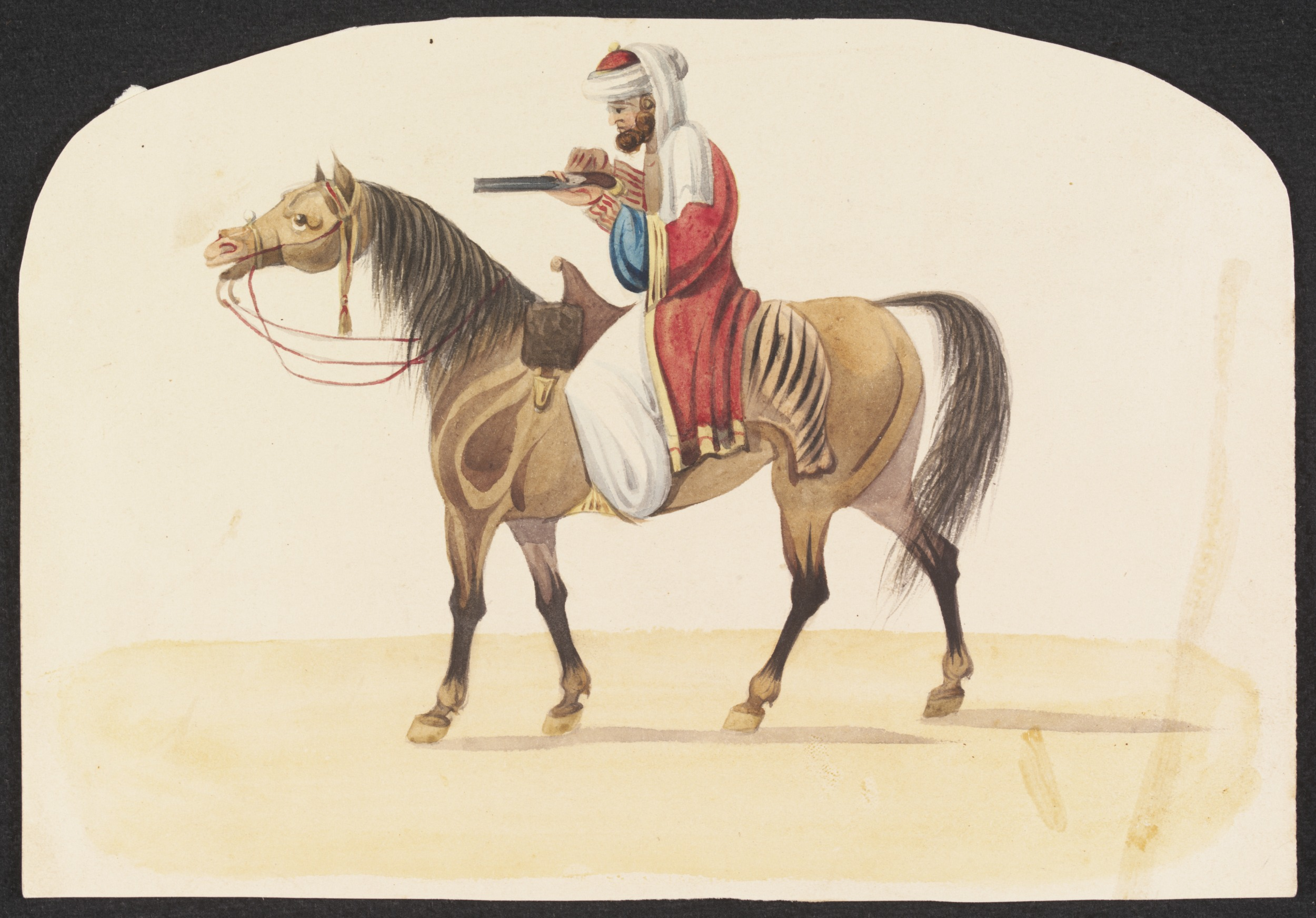
Ottoman Empire pistolier from the early 19th century

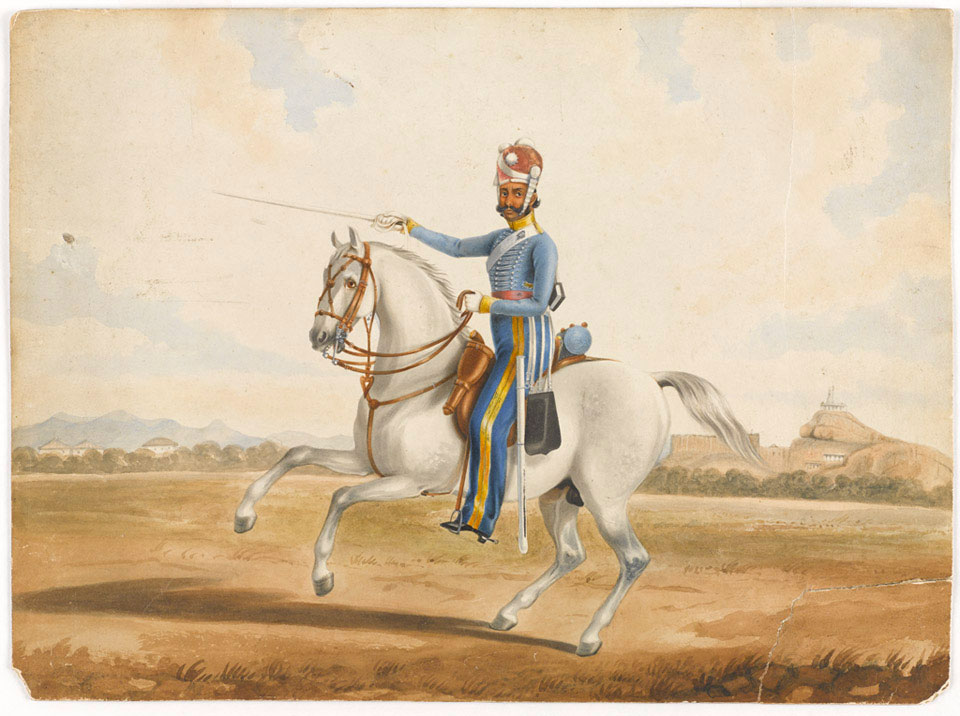
c. 1847 painting of a Madras Army sowar armed with two pistols

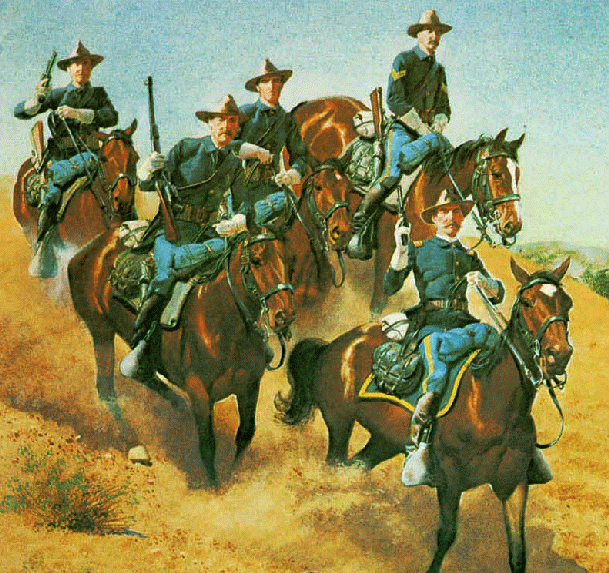
The US Cavalry of the American Civil War were equipped with a carbine for dismounted skirmishing and a pair of revolvers for use in the saddle.

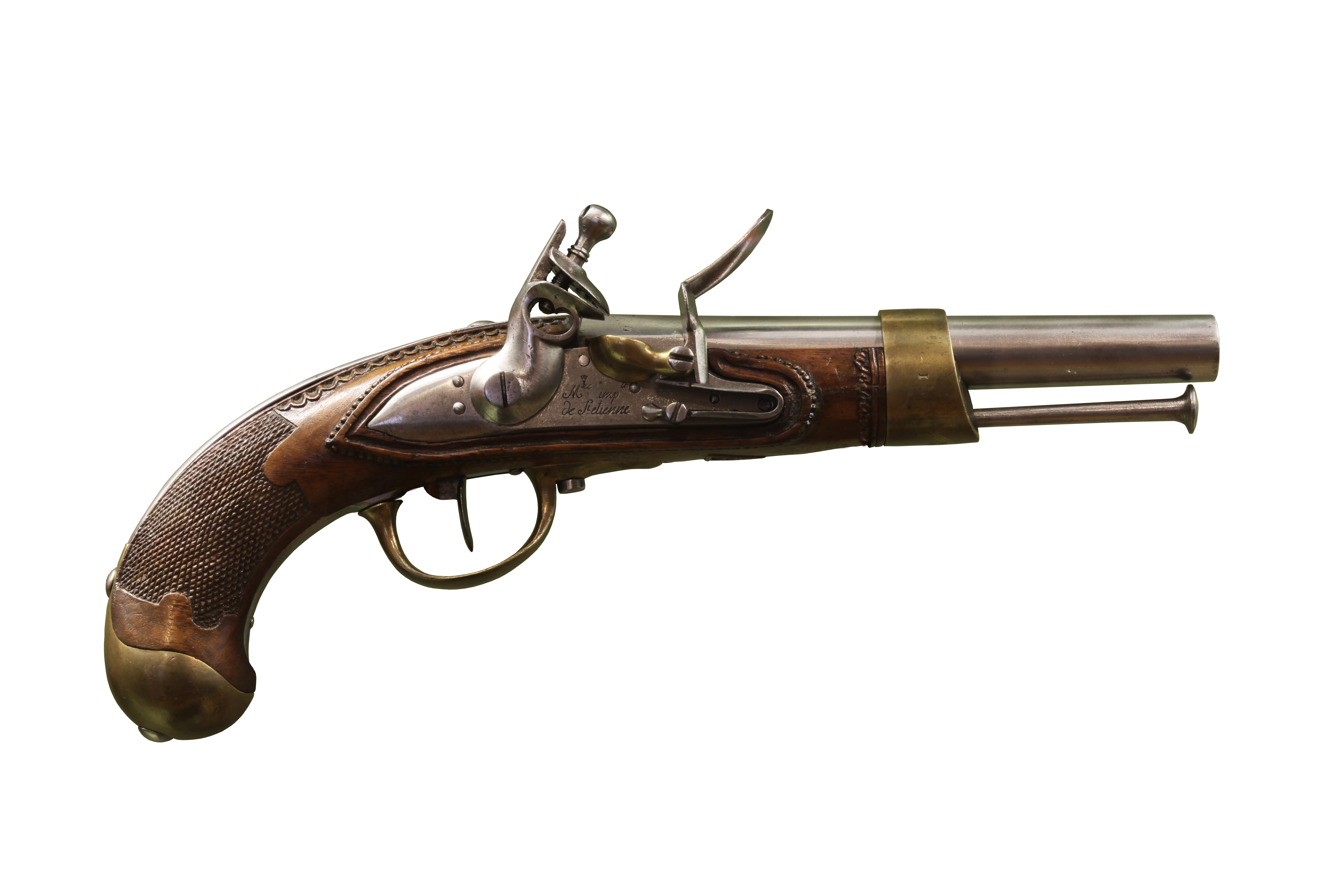
French cavalry pistol from the early 19th century

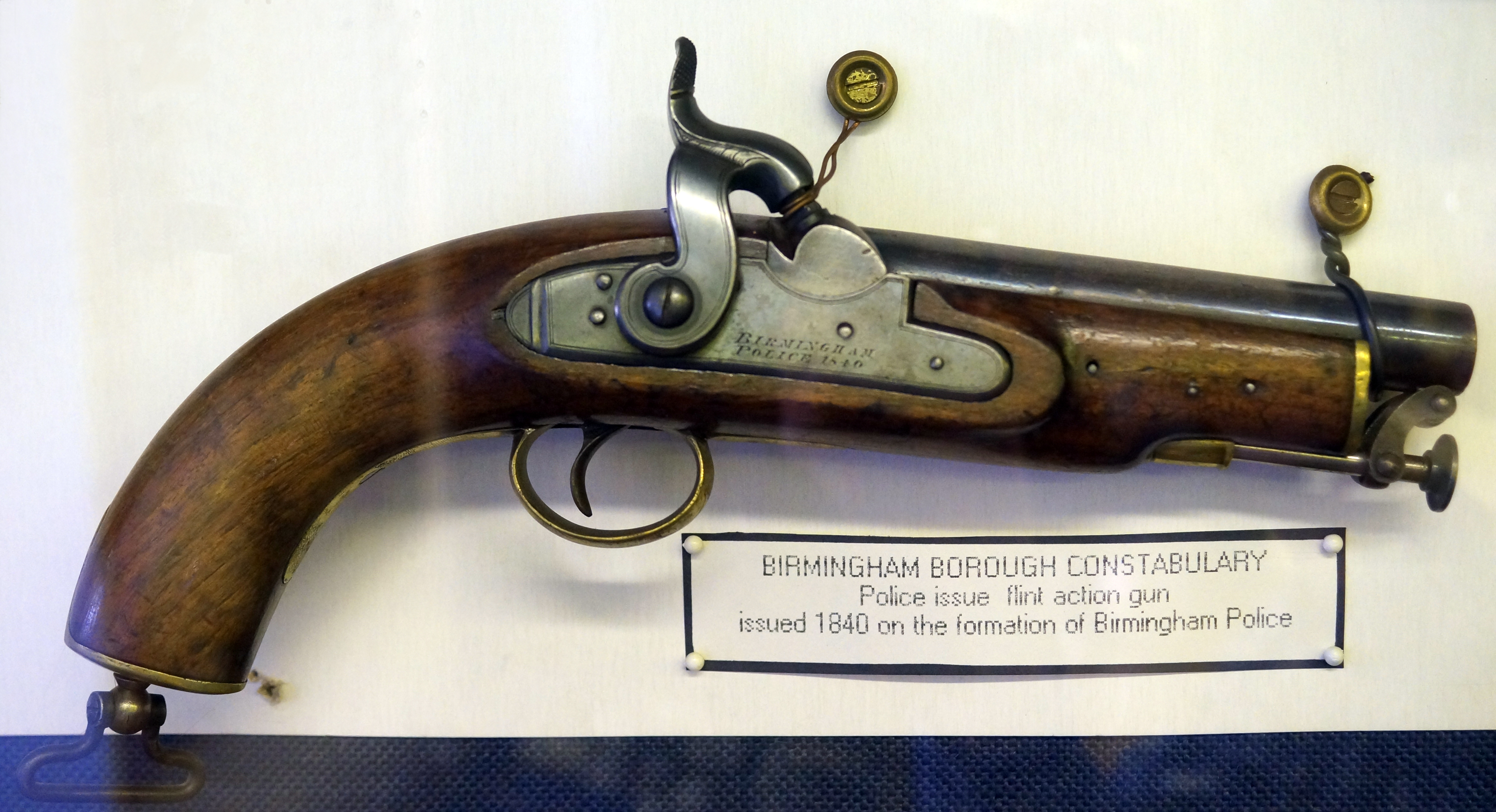
Birmingham mounted police pistol of 1840, based on the 1832 Indian Pattern

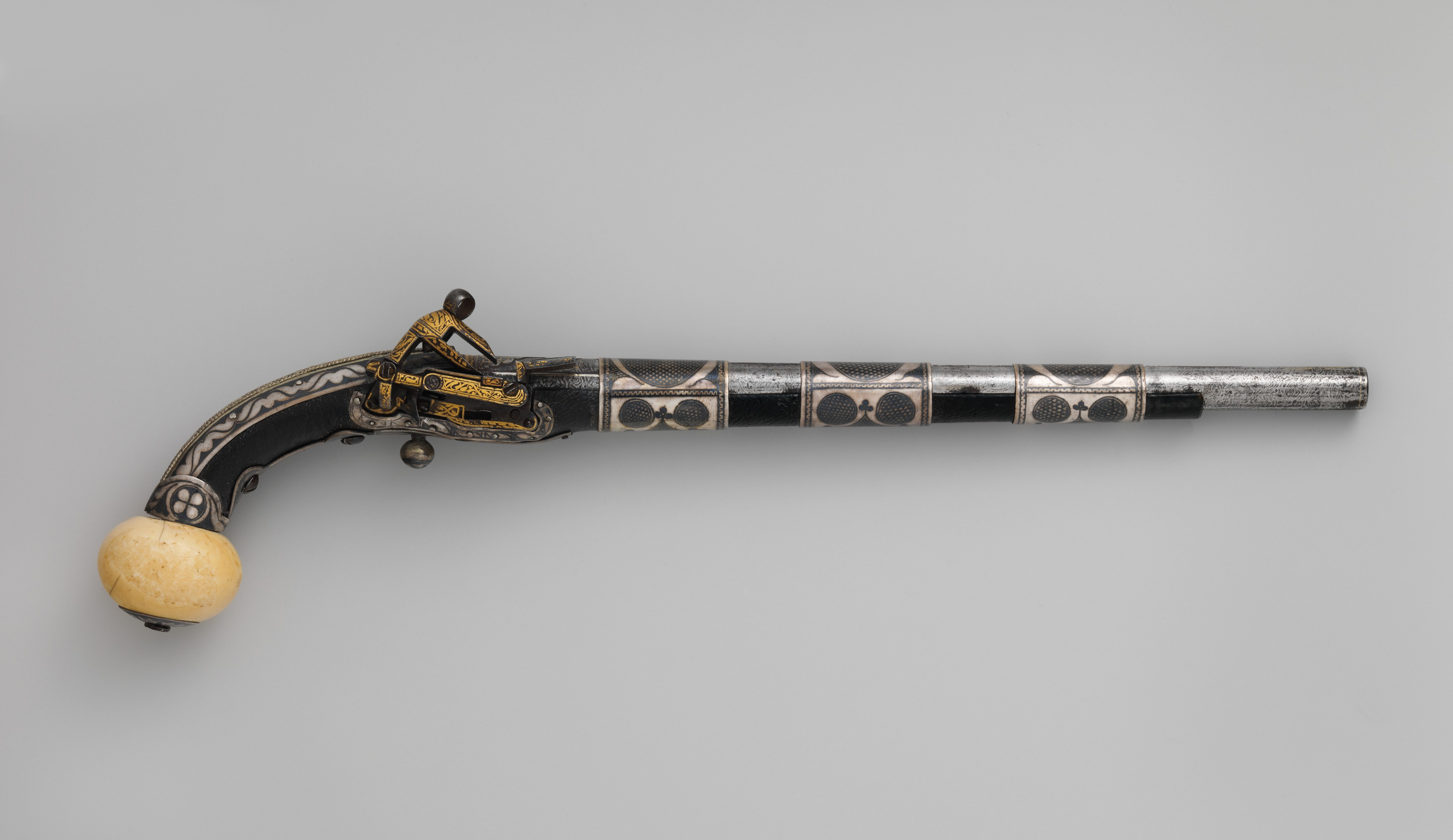
Cossack horse pistol with Italian miquelet lock

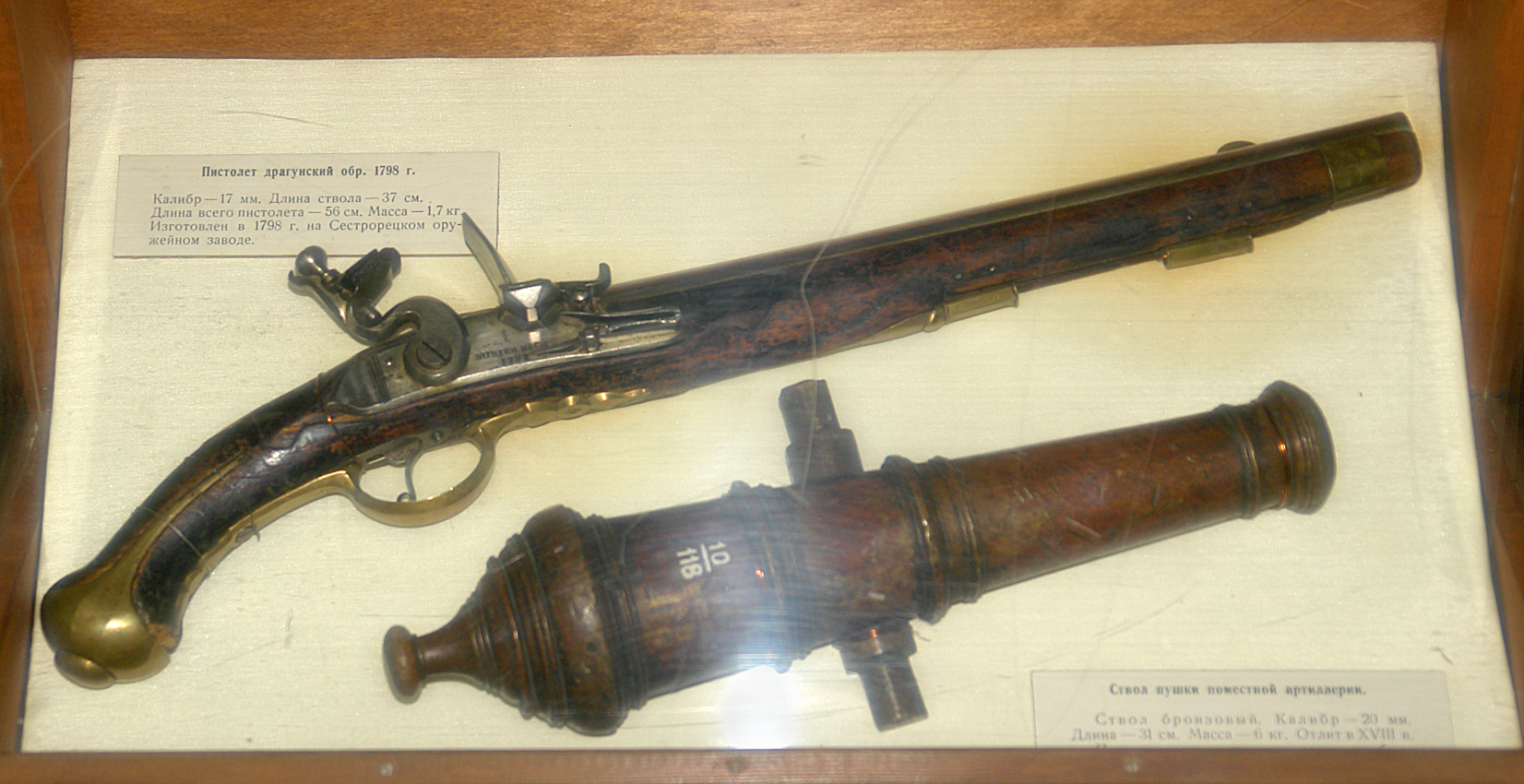
Russian dragoon pistol model 1798

== See also ==
- Dragoon
- Hussar
