= Pistolet modèle 1786 =

Pistolet modèle 1777/1786
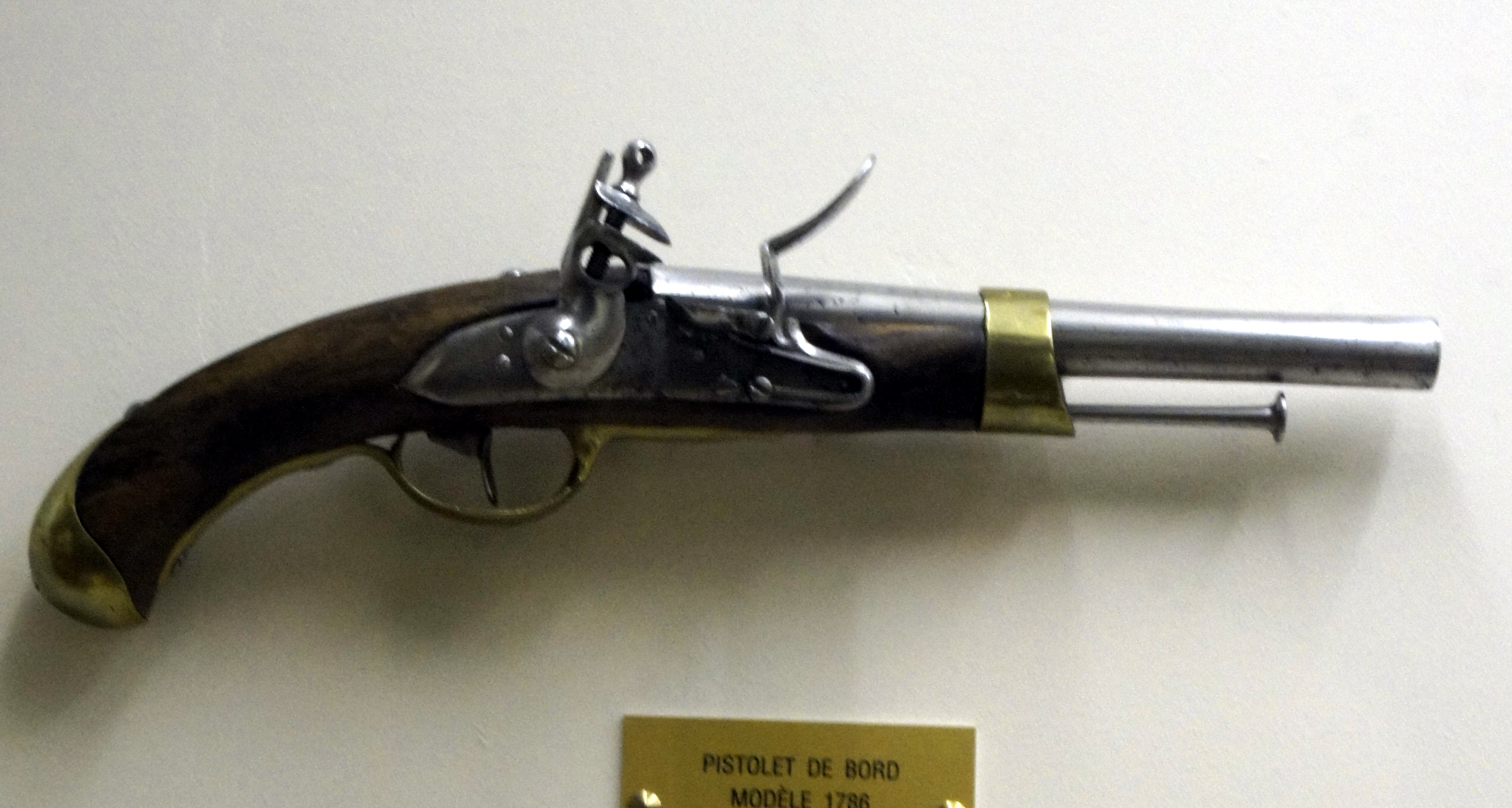
- Pistolet modèle 1786. On display at the Musée Saint-Remi de Reims.
- Type: Flintlock pistol
- Place of origin: France

Service history
- In service: 1786 –
- Used by: France and various others
- Wars: French Revolutionary wars Napoleonic Wars

Production history
- Manufacturer: Manufactures Impériales of Charleville, Maubeuge, St-Etienne, Tulle, Versailles, Mutzig and Torino
- Produced: 1777/1786-1806

Specifications
- Cartridge: 0.65" (16.51mm) Black Powder Paper Cartridge
- Calibre: 0.69" (17.5 mm)
- Action: Flintlock
- Rate of fire: 2 to 3 rpm
- Effective firing range: 5 to 10 metres
- Feed system: Muzzle Loading
- Sights: None

The Pistolet modèle 1786 was the Naval designation for the Pistolet modèle 1777 flintlock pistol pattern; introduced to French Military units in 1777 for the Cavalry and Army, 1786 for the Navy and was produced until 1801, when it was superseded by the Pistolet modèle An IX.

The Pistolet modèle 1777/1786 was a replacement for the Pistolet modèle 1733 (and subsequent 1763/66 variants). This was the first modification since the French and Indian War and incorporated the same changes of the musket variants of the same pattern year; however reverted the spring based barrel bands to a very heavy brass front barrel band that was pinned in. Two variants of this pattern were produced which included one with a belt hook and one without. The one without a belt hook ultimately was more popular.

Although the Model 1777/86 was initially more popular than the 1763/66 Pattern (mainly due to its lower recoil and better balance when handling the weapon), the tune changed when the pistols began needing maintenance and repair work. It was found by Military Armorers that they were very difficult to fix, the Hussar Regiments complained the pistols warmed up too easily (about 3 shots to overheat), and it was found by the soldiers that used them that the ramrod was also useless; forcing them to use cleaning rods as makeshift ramrods. It was also observed that dismantling and cleaning the pistol in the field was practically impossible and thus a change was necessary. While the 1777/86 Pattern pistol's shortcomings were being fixed, 1763/66 Pattern weapons were taken out of storage and reissued to troops to replace the 1777/86 Pattern. It wasn't until 1801 when the kinks were worked out and the Pistolet modèle An IX was issued.

== Sources and references ==
- Pistolet de bord 1786
- PISTOLET DE BORD MODELE 1786 (MARINE)
