= Pistolet modèle An XIII =

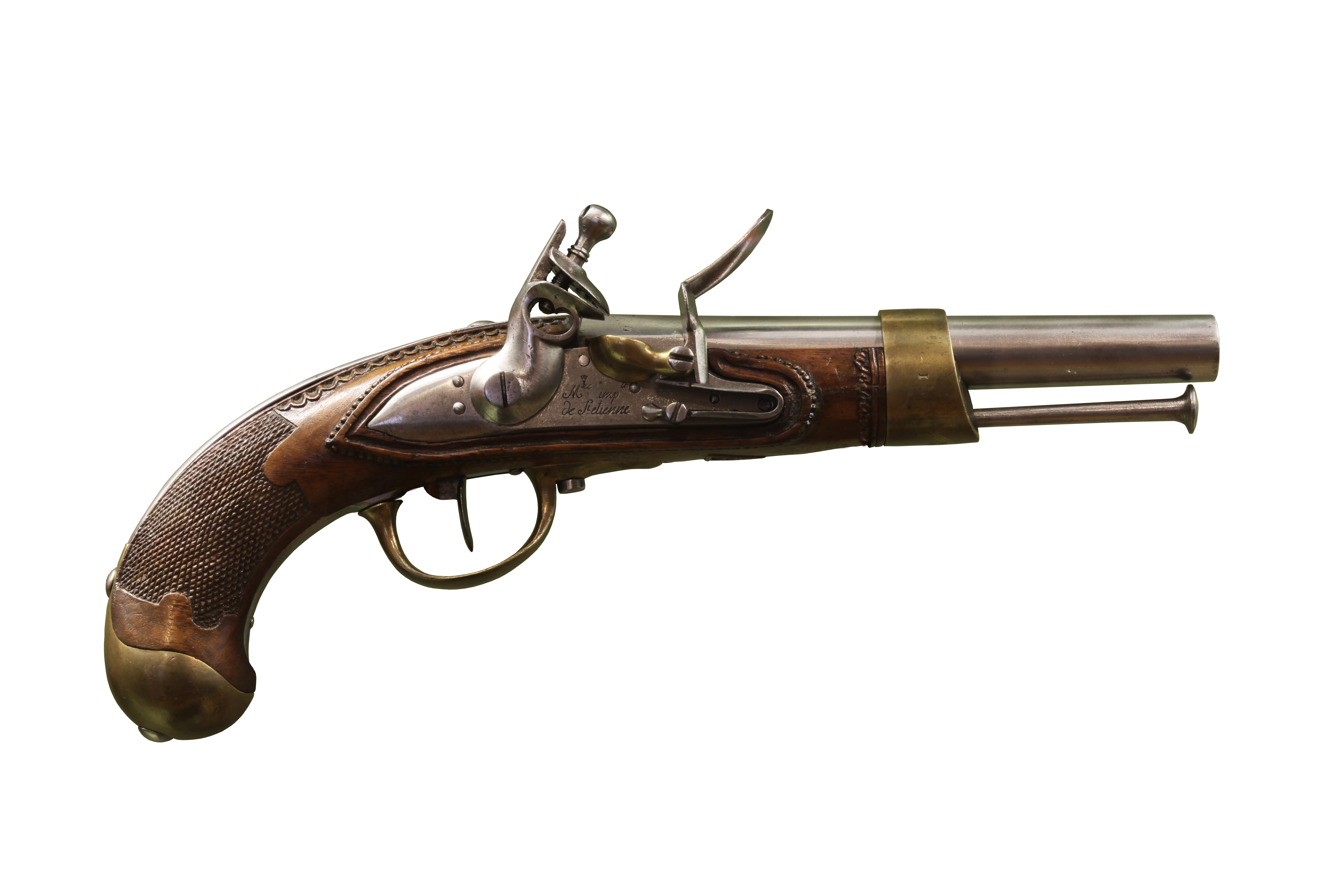
- French cavalry pistol model An XIII, made by M.(anufacture) Imp.(éria)le de Saint-Etienne circa 1804-1815. M. On display at Morges castle museum.
- Type: Flintlock pistol
- Place of origin: France

Service history
- In service: 1806 - 1840
- Used by: France and various others
- Wars: Napoleonic Wars

Production history
- Manufacturer: Manufactures Impériales of Charleville, Maubeuge, St-Etienne, Tulle, Versailles, Mutzig and Torino
- Produced: 1806-1814
- No. built: 300 000

Specifications
- Mass: 1.270 kg
- Length: 352 mm
- Barrel length: 207 mm
- Cartridge: 16.54 mm (0.65"), 27.19 g lead ball 6.52 black-powder propellant 1g black-powder ignition
- Calibre: 17.1 mm (0.69")
- Action: flintlock/caplock (after 1840s)
- Rate of fire: 2 to 3 rpm
- Muzzle velocity: 168 m/s
- Effective firing range: 5 to 10 metres
- Feed system: muzzle loading
- Sights: None

The Pistolet modèle An XIII was a flintlock cavalry pistol, in service in French units from 1806.

The Pistolet modèle An XIII was mostly inspired by the Pistolet modèle An IX, which it succeeded, but also incorporated elements of the Navy pistolet modèle 1786, notably the barrel mountings. A critical difference between the Pistolet modèle 1777/1786's front barrel band and the one used on the Pistolet modèle An XIII was that instead of being pinned into place like the former, it was instead screwed into place and the barrel band was lighter weight; mostly solving the overheating problem the barrel band design caused in the Pistolet modèle 1777/1786. This variant was ultimately made to reduce the cost and simplify the weapon compared to the Pistolet modèle An IX while retaining similar reliability and ease of care as the previous pattern. Over 300,000 pistols were made, mostly between 1806 and 1814 in Charleville, Maubeuge and St-Etienne.

The Pistolet modèle An XIII was designed to equip mounted units, each horseman using two pistols. It was also used by the Navy. Both the An IX and An XIII patterns co-existed for a time after initial introduction, however some of the An IX Pattern Pistols were upgraded to the An XIII standard. An improved version, known as the M1822, was produced after the Napoleonic Wars. They were kept in service well into the 1840s, at which date the pistols still in usage were converted to use percussion caps.

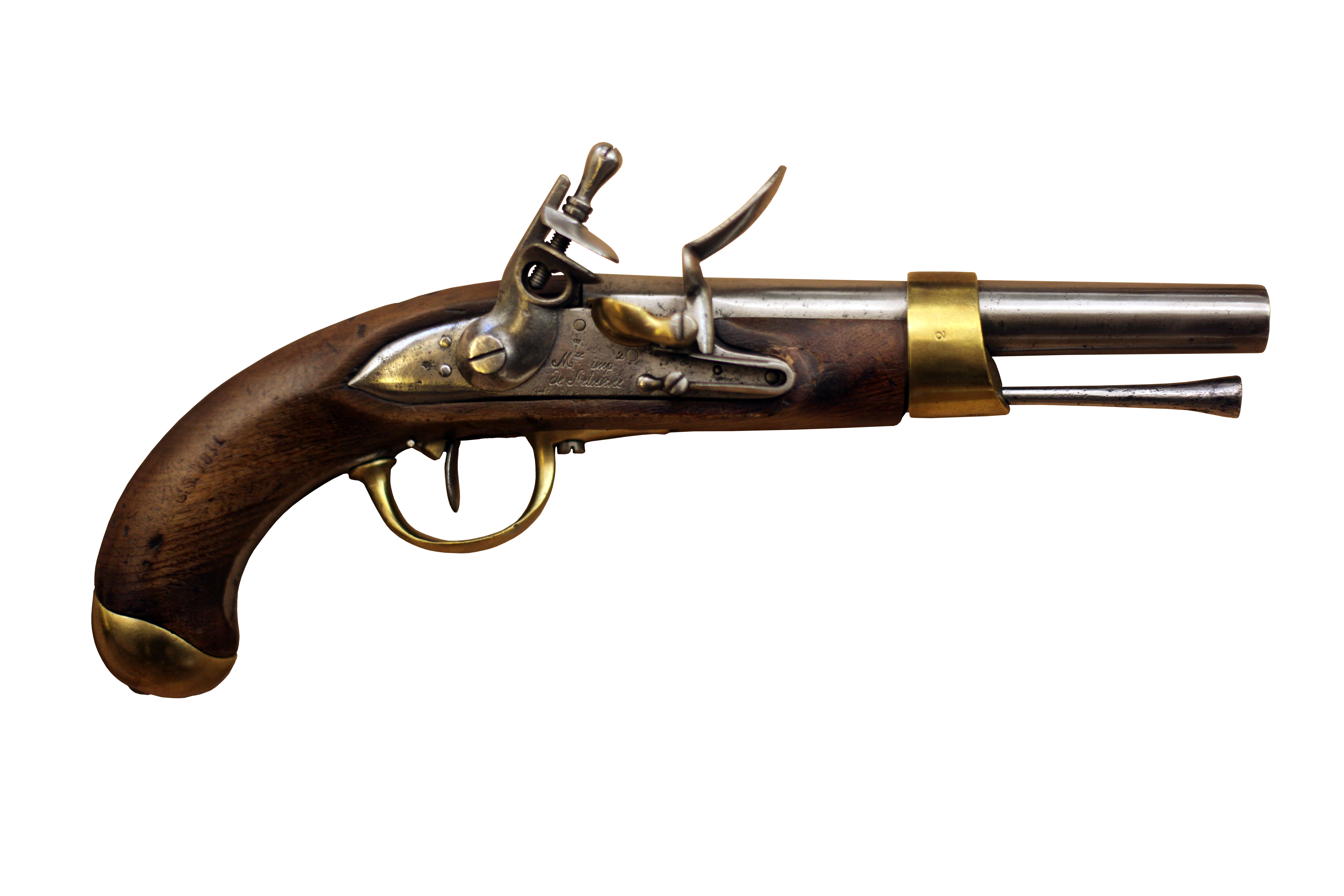
Navy pistol, on display at the Musée national de la Marine

== Sources and references ==
- "Le pistolet de 17,1 mm de cavalerie modèle an XIII". Armes Francaises (in French).
