= Pistolet modèle An IX =

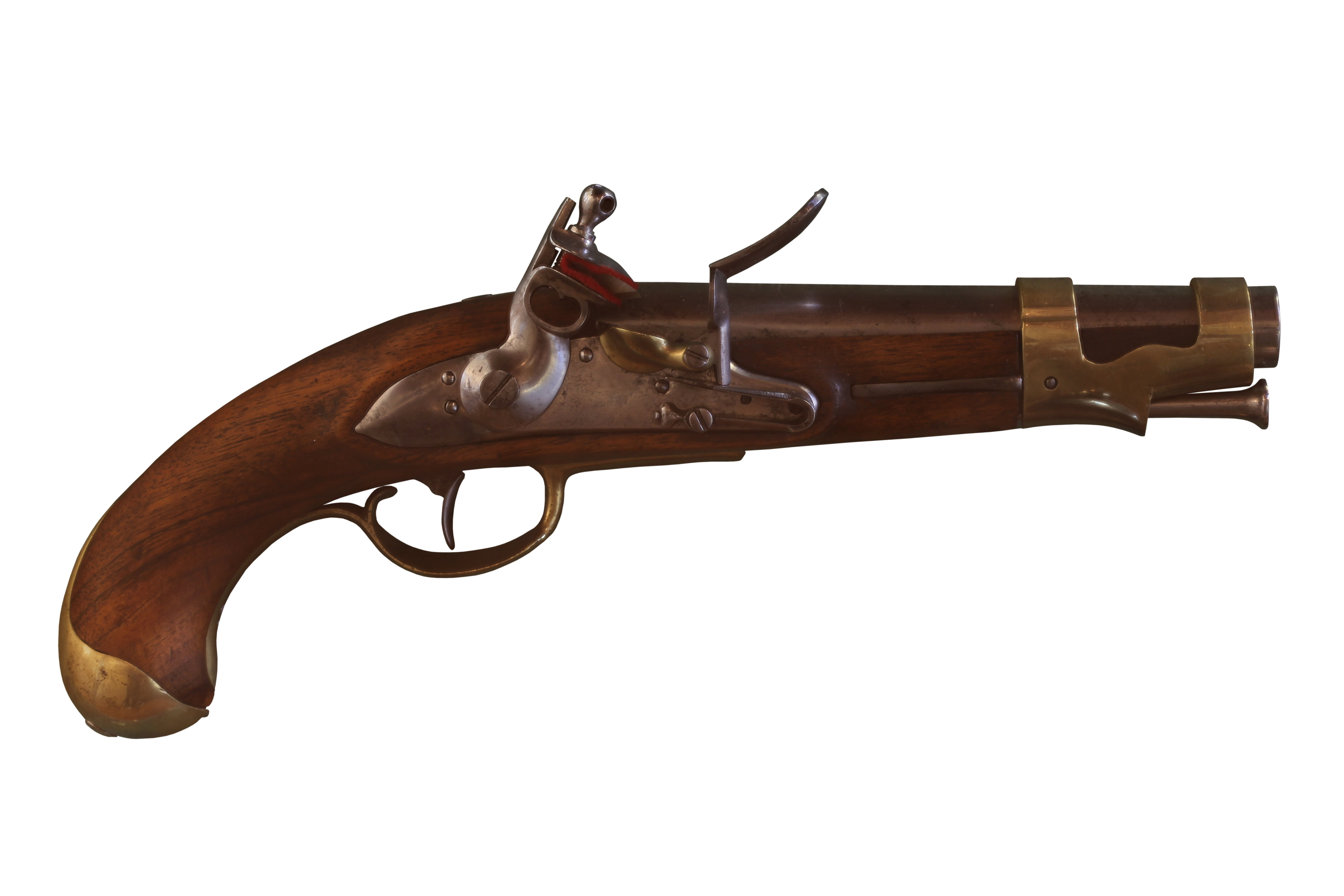
- French cavalry pistol model An IX. On display at Vevy History museum.
- Type: Flintlock pistol
- Place of origin: France

Service history
- In service: 1801 - ca. 1815
- Used by: France and various others
- Wars: Napoleonic Wars

Production history
- Manufacturer: Manufactures Impériales of Charleville, Maubeuge, St-Etienne, Tulle, Versailles, Mutzig and Torino
- Produced: 1801 - 1808
- No. built: 80 000

Specifications
- Mass: 1.290 kg
- Length: 352 mm
- Barrel length: 207 mm
- Cartridge: 16.54 mm (0.65"), 27.19 g lead ball 6.52 black-powder propellant 1g black-powder ignition
- Calibre: 17.5 mm (0.69")
- Action: flintlock/caplock (after 1840s - An XIII standard Only)
- Rate of fire: 2 to 3 rpm
- Muzzle velocity: 168 m/s
- Effective firing range: 5 to 10 metres
- Feed system: muzzle loading
- Sights: None

The Pistolet modèle An IX was a flintlock cavalry pistol, in service in French units from 1801.

The modèle An IX replaced the modèle 1777, which had been criticized to the point where the older modèle 1763 had been brought back into service.

This pistol is superficially similar in appearance to the well respected Pistolet modèle 1763/66 pattern. The Pistolet modèle An IX is in effect the same in terms of changes made to the musket pattern of the same year, but when compared to the modèle 1777/1786 had the spring and brass barrel bands of its predecessor restored to make it much easier to service.

The Pistolet modèle An IX, like its earlier patterns, was designed to equip mounted units, each cavalry soldier using two pistols. It was used in most mounted units of the Consulat and during the early years of the Empire, as well as in the Navy.

In 1806, the Pistolet modèle An XIII was introduced; the two patterns co-existed for some time, until the last modèles An IX were upgraded to the An XIII standard. In the 1840s, the variants that were now of the An XIII standard were converted to a caplock action.

Variants
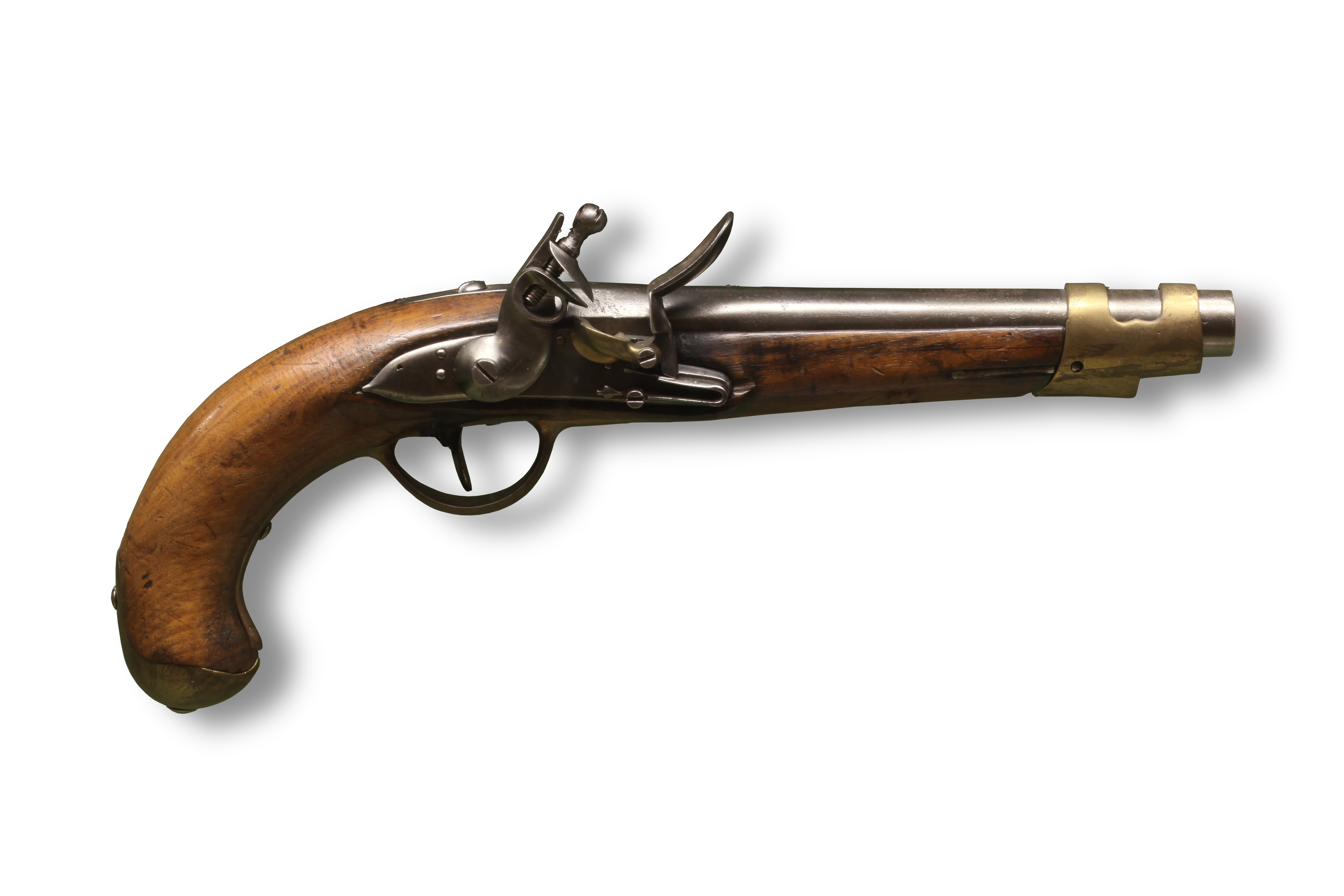
A variant with longer barrel.

== Sources and references ==
- "Le pistolet de cavalerie de 17,1 mm modèle an IX". Armes Francaises (in French).
