= Pistolet modèle 1733 =

Flintlock cavalry pistol, in service in French units from 1733

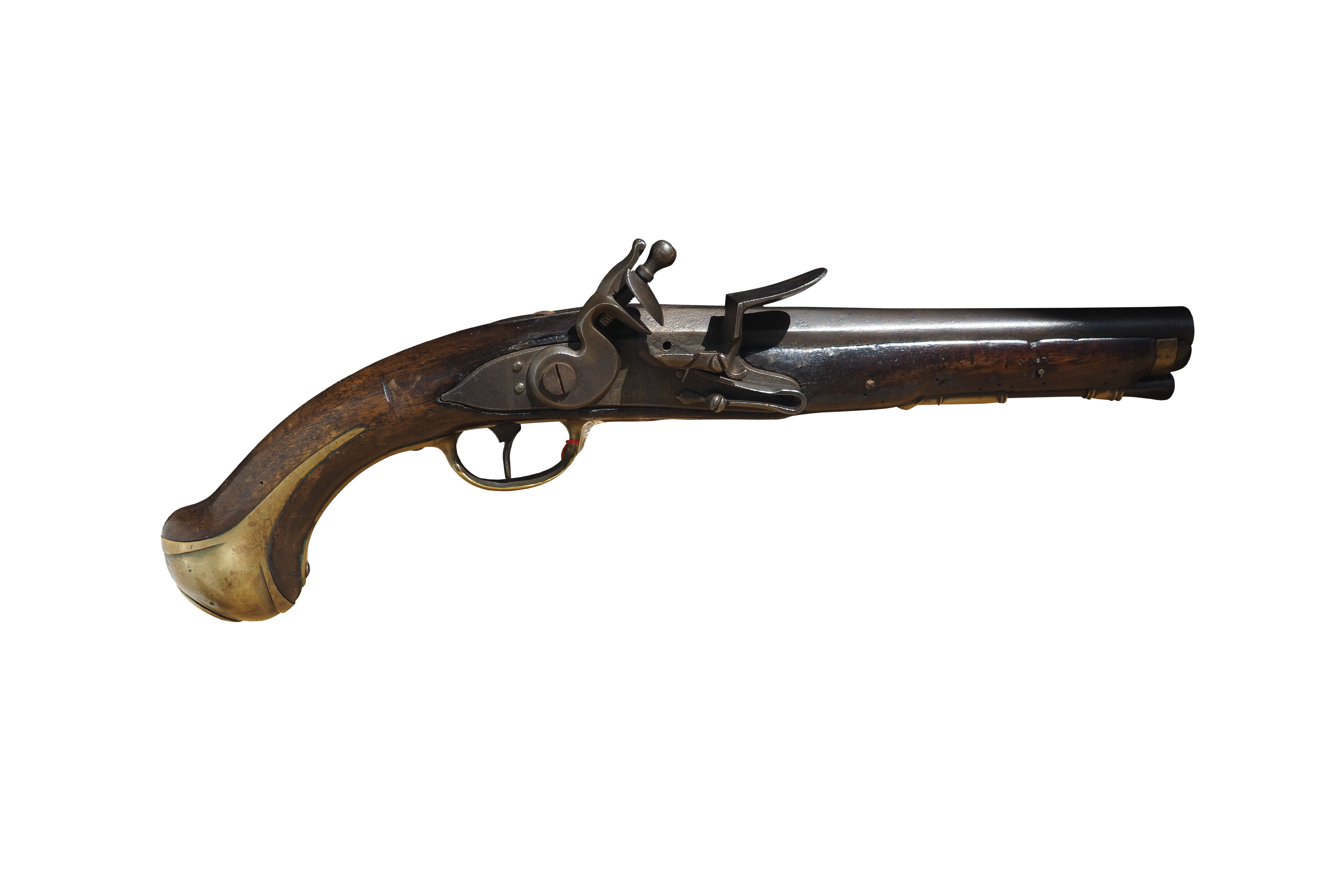
- French cavalry pistol modèle 1733.
- Type: Flintlock pistol
- Place of origin: France

Service history
- In service: 1733–1777, 1787–1801
- Used by: France and various others
- Wars: Seven Years' War

Production history
- Manufacturer: Manufacture Impériale de St-Etienne, Manufacture Impériale de Tulle, Manufacture Impériale de Charleville, et al.
- Produced: 1733, 1763, 1766

Specifications
- Mass: 1.230 kg
- Length: 486 mm
- Barrel length: 310 mm
- Cartridge: 0.65" (16.51mm) Black Powder Paper Cartridge
- Calibre: 0.69" (17.5 mm)
- Action: Flintlock
- Rate of fire: 2 to 3 rpm
- Effective firing range: 5 to 10 metres
- Feed system: Muzzle Loading
- Sights: None

The Pistolet modèle 1733 was a flintlock cavalry pistol, in service in French units starting from 1733. These Pistols were generally issued in pairs to Cavalry Units and Cavalry Officers (cuirassiers, hussars and uhlan lancers), In less quantity to Naval Officers and in uncommon cases to Infantry Officers.

The modèle 1733 was the designation of the first standardized pistol in France. As a result of a standardization effort under Louis XV, who selected the pistol variant used in 1731 by the Garde du Corps as the basis on which future pistols would be made, this variant would become the Modèle 1733.

In general, many of these standard pistols shared several superficial qualities with their Musket pattern counterparts; including their Caliber of 0.69" (17.5mm) and many elements of their furnishings. Several iterative variants of this pistol were produced until the Modèle 1763 Pattern; which included some revolutionary changes. One of these additions the Modèle 1763 had compared to earlier Models was the use of a spring based barrel band system; similar to the type used by the Modèle 1763 musket pattern around the same time. This aided in disassembly and maintenance compared to earlier types. The Modèle 1766 was of a similar case, being similar to the modifications made to the musket pattern of the same year. Both the 1763 and 1766 Models became the most popular of all French Flintlock Pistols and remained so until the Modèle 1801 (An IX) was issued to the French Military. Due to the Failure of the 1777/1786 Pattern Pistol to please the French Soldiers, examples of the 1763 and 1766 Patterns were reissued to the troops until 1801.

Gallery
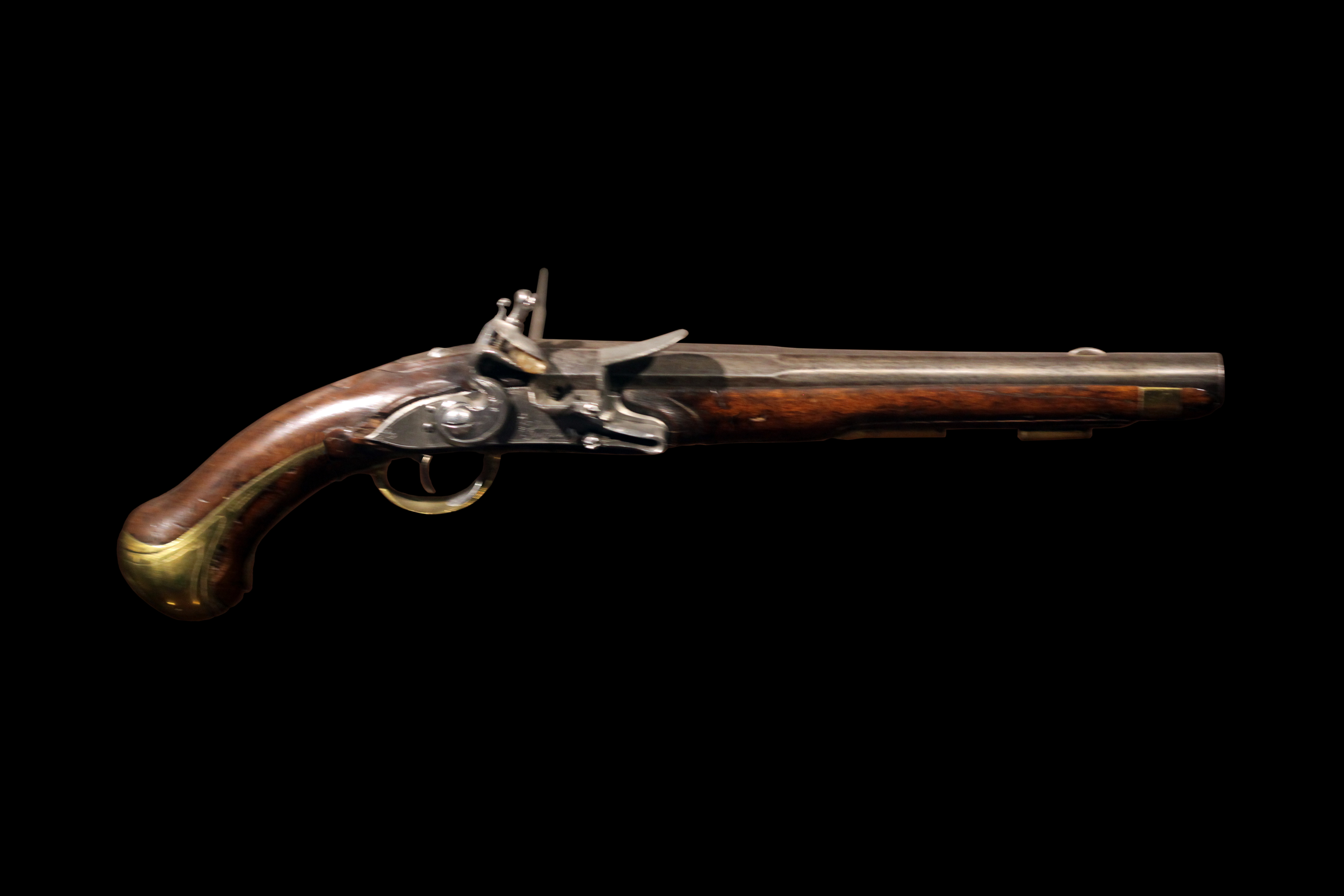
1733 Pattern Ordnance pistol of the Gendarmes de la Maison du Roi, made 1750. On display at Musée de l'Armée.

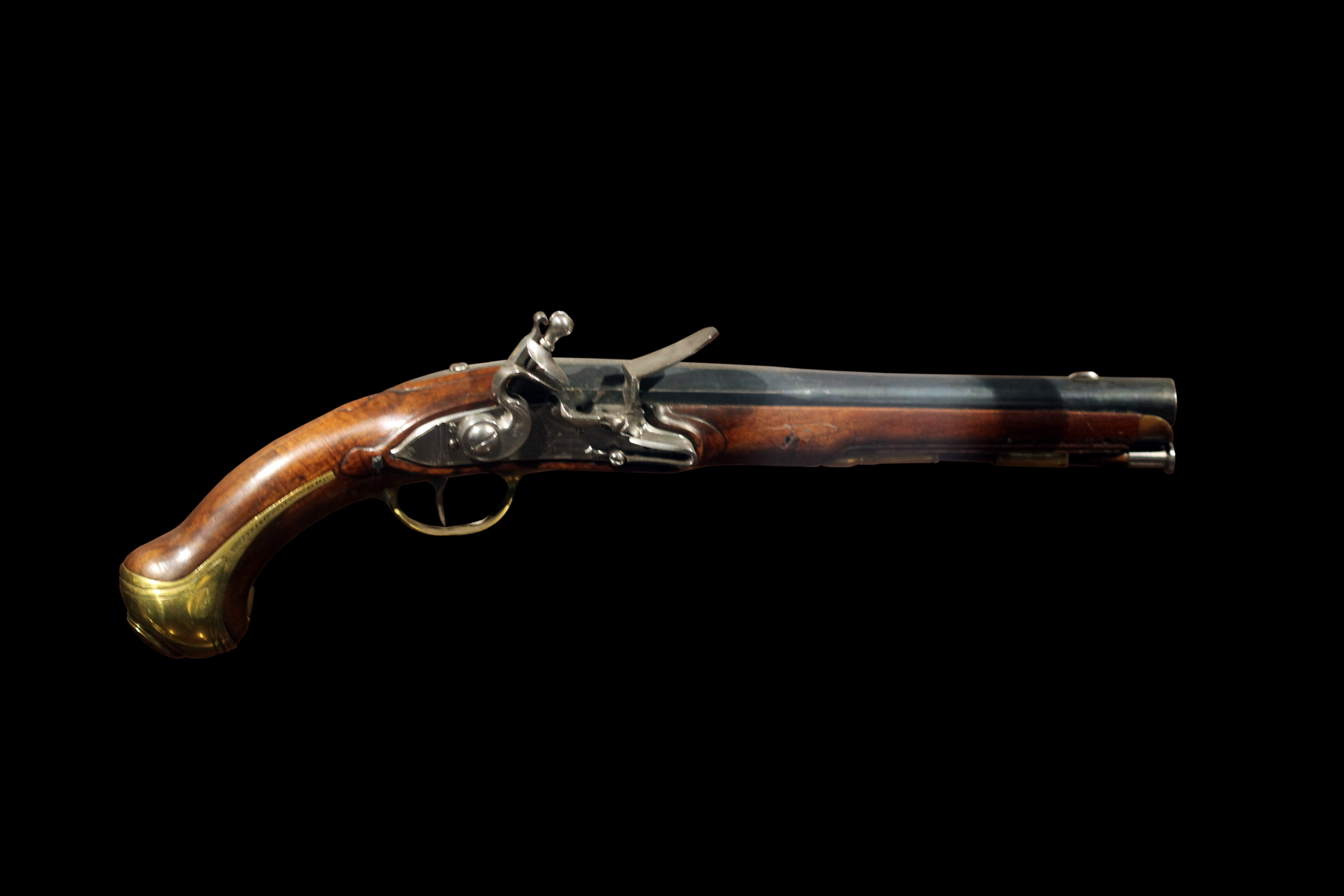
1733 Pattern Ordnance pistol of the Gendarmes de la Maison du Roi, made 1763. On display at Musée de l'Armée.

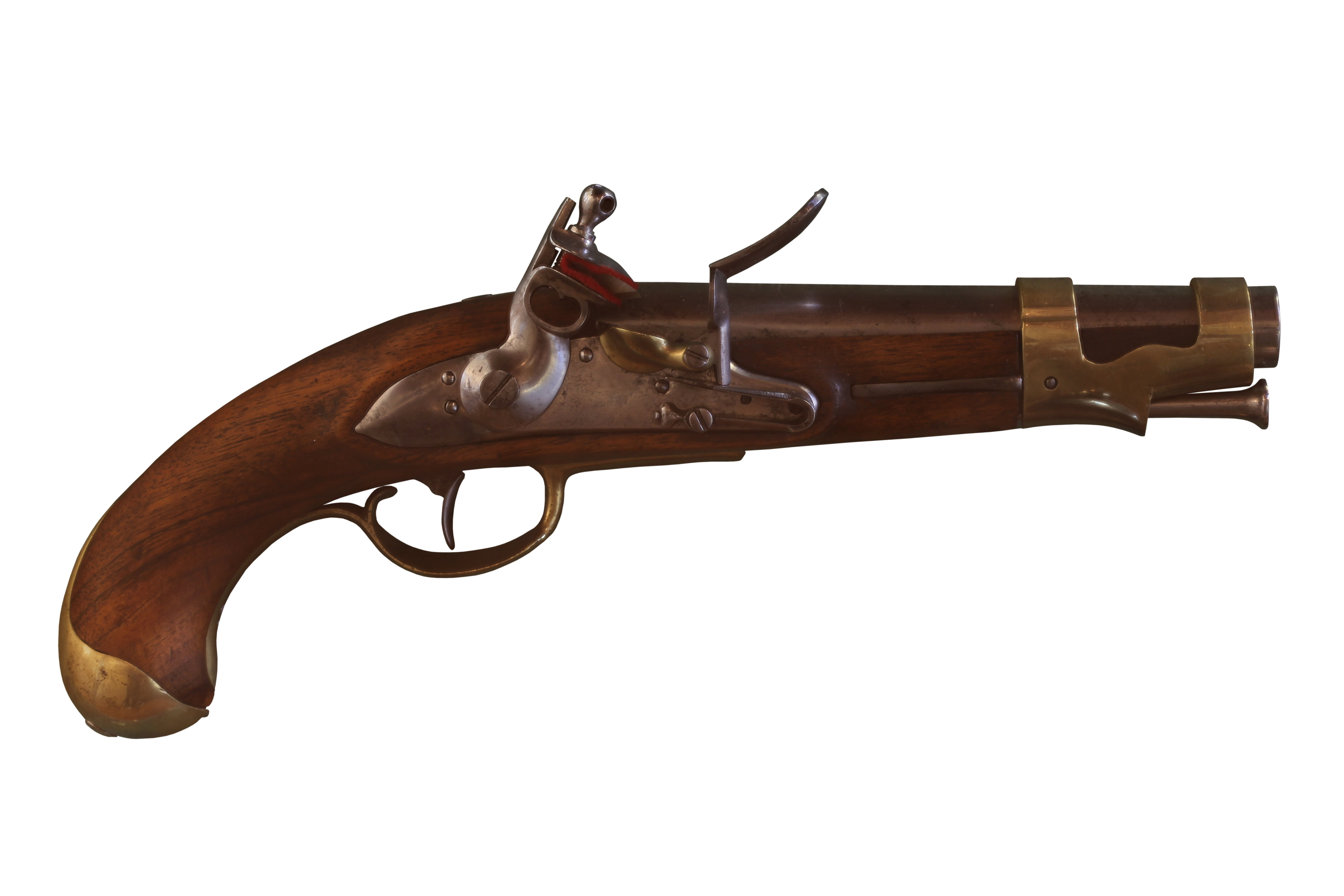
The An IX Pattern Pistol; Superficially Similar to the 1763/1766 Pattern of Pistol. On display at Vevey historical museum, accession number 382.
