= Brown powder =

Explosive-based propellant used in large artillery and ship's guns

Brown powder or prismatic powder, sometimes referred as "cocoa powder" due to its color, was a propellant used in large artillery and ship's guns from the 1870s to the 1890s. While similar to black powder, it was chemically formulated and formed hydraulically into a specific grain shape to provide slower burn rates with neutral or progressive burning, as opposed to the faster and regressive burn typical of randomly shaped grains of black powder produced by crushing and screening powder formed into sheets in a press box, as was typical for cannon powder previously.

== Characteristics ==
For pure explosive damage, high burn rates or detonation speeds (and accompanying brisance) are generally preferable, but in guns and especially cannons, slower-burning powder decreases firing stresses. This allows for lighter, longer (and more accurate) barrels with associated decreases in production and maintenance costs. Further modifications of its burning rate were achieved by shaping the powder grains into prismatic shapes, typically single-perforated hexagonal or octagonal prisms.

They became obsolete as a propellant due to the introduction of nitro-explosive propellants such as Poudre B, in France, and later by Nobel's ballistite and, in Britain, by cordite. These new propellants produced less smoke, particularly less black smoke.

== Composition ==
The differences in burning rate were achieved by several means. Changes to formulation were altering ingredients relative percentage by weight and using differently processed charcoals for fuel than those of a standard 75:15:10 (potassium nitrate:charcoal:sulfur) black cannon powder.

Typically, sulfur was either not used in brown powders, or sulfur content reduced to around 1% by weight from the usual 10%. The reduction or outright removal of sulfur slowed the burn rate, while replacement of higher molecular weight sulfur dioxide by carbon dioxide or monoxide in the propellant gas mixture gave a higher specific impulse.

Differently processed charcoals were used. Fully carbonized charcoal (mostly composed of elemental carbon) in black powder provides its distinctive black color, while its replacement with an incompletely carbonized, brownish colored charcoal produces a dark brown appearance, hence the names "brown powder" or "cocoa powder". The less carbonized charcoal was more reactive than fully carbonized charcoal, somewhat making up for the easy ignition characteristics usually provided by sulfur. The brown charcoal also helped to produce sturdier grains and replaced sulfur in the role of a binder.

Further modifications of burn rate were achieved by shaping the individual powder grains, often into prismatic shapes such as single-perforated hexagonal or octagonal prisms.

== History ==
Large-grained powder, made in the traditional way as flat sheets but screened to larger sizes, was introduced in the 1850s by U.S. Army Major Thomas Rodman for his large-calibre cannon. In 1875 Lammot du Pont invented Hexagonal powder for large artillery, which was pressed using shaped plates with a small center core; about 1.5 inches (38 mm) diameter, like a wagon wheel nut, the center hole widened as the grain burned. By 1880 naval guns were using Hexagonal grains, 1 inch (25 mm) in height. Very large grain powders, being subject to defects in manufacturing, did not completely remove the danger of overpressure, as demonstrated in the 1880 accident on the Italian ironclad Duilio, which involved powder made at the chemical works at Fossano.

In 1882 the German Rottweil Company developed Prismatic Brown Powder (PBC), which was also adopted by the Royal Navy in 1884. It retarded burning even further by using only 2 percent sulfur and using charcoal made from rye straw that had not been completely charred. It was pressed into prisms with a central hole, similar to the 1.5 inches (38 mm) DuPont Hexagonal.

The French Navy instead developed the Slow Burning Cocoa (SBC) powder, which had grains of about 3.1 millimetres (0.12 in); still only 40% of it burned, the rest was ejected as heavy black smoke.

The first smokeless propellant, the guncotton-based Poudre B was introduced by the French Navy in 1886, triggering rapid development of smokeless compounds which replaced brown powder.
