= Lebel Model 1886 rifle =

French bolt-action rifle

Lebel Model 1886 rifle Fusil Modèle 1886/M93
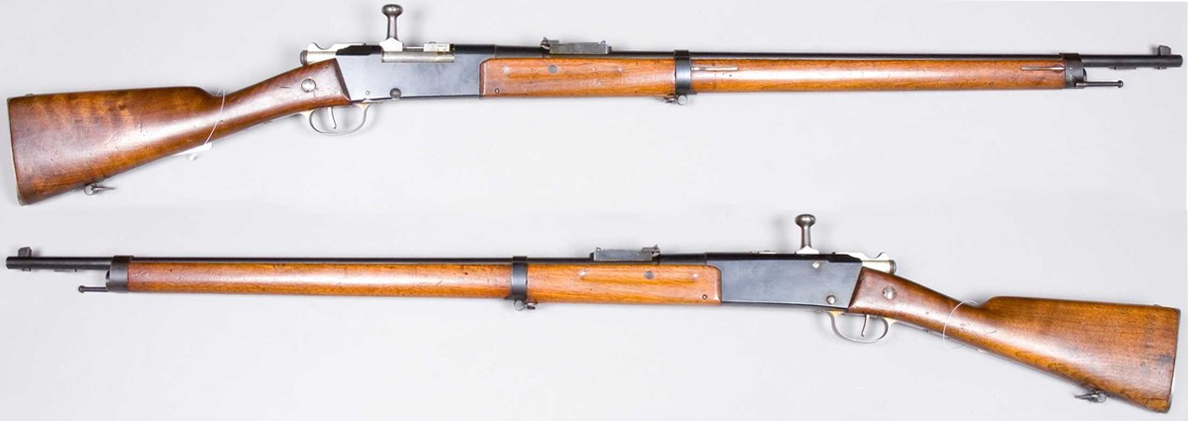
- Lebel M1886. From the Swedish Army Museum.
- Type: Bolt-action rifle
- Place of origin: French Third Republic

Service history
- In service: 1887–1945 (France); 1945–present (limited usage)
- Used by: See Users
- Wars: Boxer Rebellion; French colonial expeditions First Italo-Ethiopian War; Greco-Turkish War (1919–1922); Monegasque Revolution; World War I Franco-Turkish War; Polish–Soviet War; Spanish Civil War; Second Italo-Ethiopian War; World War II; First Indochina War; Algerian War (limited); War in Afghanistan (2001–2021); Iraq War (limited)

Production history
- Designer: Team led by Gen. Baptiste Tramond (Gras, Lebel, Vieille, Bonnet, Desaleux, Close, Verdin)
- Designed: 1885–1886
- Manufacturer: Manufacture d'armes de Saint-Étienne; Manufacture d'armes de Châtellerault; Manufacture Nationale d'Armes de Tulle
- Unit cost: 40 francs (1891)
- Produced: 1887–1920
- No. built: 3,450,000

Specifications
- Mass: 4.41 kg (9.7 lb) (loaded with 8 rounds); 4.18 kg (9.2 lb) (unloaded)
- Length: 130 cm (51.2 in)
- Barrel length: 80 cm (31.5 in)
- Cartridge: 8×50mmR Lebel
- Caliber: 8mm 4 grooves, right to left twist
- Action: Bolt-action
- Rate of fire: 43 rounds per minute
- Muzzle velocity: 610 to 700 m/s (2,000 to 2,300 ft/s)
- Effective firing range: 400 m (438 yards) (individual targets)
- Maximum firing range: 1,800 m (1,968 yards) (volley fire at massed area targets)
- Feed system: 8-round tube magazine +1 in the elevator +1 in the chamber (unsafe in chamber)
- Sights: U-notch and front post

The Lebel Model 1886 rifle (French: Fusil Modèle 1886 dit "Fusil Lebel") also known as the "Fusil Mle 1886 M93", after a bolt modification was added in 1893, is an 8 mm bolt-action infantry rifle that entered service in the French Army in 1887. It is a repeating rifle that can hold eight rounds in its fore-stock tube magazine, one round in the elevator plus one round in the chamber; equaling a total of ten rounds held. The Lebel rifle has the distinction of being the first military firearm to use smokeless powder ammunition. The new propellant powder, "Poudre B," was nitrocellulose-based and had been invented in 1884 by French chemist Paul Vieille. Lieutenant Colonel Nicolas Lebel contributed a flat nosed 8 mm full metal jacket bullet ("Balle M," or "Balle Lebel"). Twelve years later, in 1898, a solid brass pointed (spitzer) and boat-tail bullet called "Balle D" was retained for all 8mm Lebel ammunition. Each case was protected against accidental percussion inside the tube magazine by a primer cover and by a circular groove around the primer cup which caught the tip of the following pointed bullet. Featuring an oversized bolt with front locking lugs and a massive receiver, the Lebel rifle was a durable design capable of long range performance. In spite of features that became obsolete relatively quickly, such as the tube magazine and the shape of the 8mm Lebel rimmed ammunition, the Lebel rifle remained the basic weapon of French infantry during World War I (1914–1918). Altogether, 3.45 million Lebel rifles were produced by the three French state factories between 1887 and 1916.

== Operation, features, and accessories ==
In operation, the bolt is turned up to the vertical position until the two opposed front locking lugs are released from the receiver. At the end of the bolt's opening phase, a ramp on the receiver bridge forces the bolt to the rear thus providing leveraged extraction of the fired case. The rifle is fitted with a two-piece wood stock, and features a spring-loaded tubular magazine in the fore-end. Taking aim at intermediate distances is done with a ramp sight graduated between 400 and 800 meters. The ladder rear sight is adjustable from 850 to 2,400 meters. Flipping forward that ladder sight reveals the commonly used fixed combat sight up to 400 meters. The Mle 1886 Lebel rifle has a 10-round capacity: eight in the under-barrel tube magazine, one in the elevator, and one in the chamber (although unsafe to leave a cartridge in the chamber as the rifle does not have a safety). The Lebel rifle features a magazine cutoff on the right side of the receiver. When activated, it prevents feeding cartridges from the magazine.

The Mle 1886 Lebel rifle was issued with a long needle-like quadrangular épée bayonet, the Épée-Baïonnette Modèle 1886, with a length of 52 cm. (20 in.). With its X-shaped cross section, the épée bayonet was optimized for thrusting, designed to readily penetrate thick clothing and leather. The bayonet was dubbed "Rosalie" by French soldiers who were issued it during World War I.

== Origins and development ==
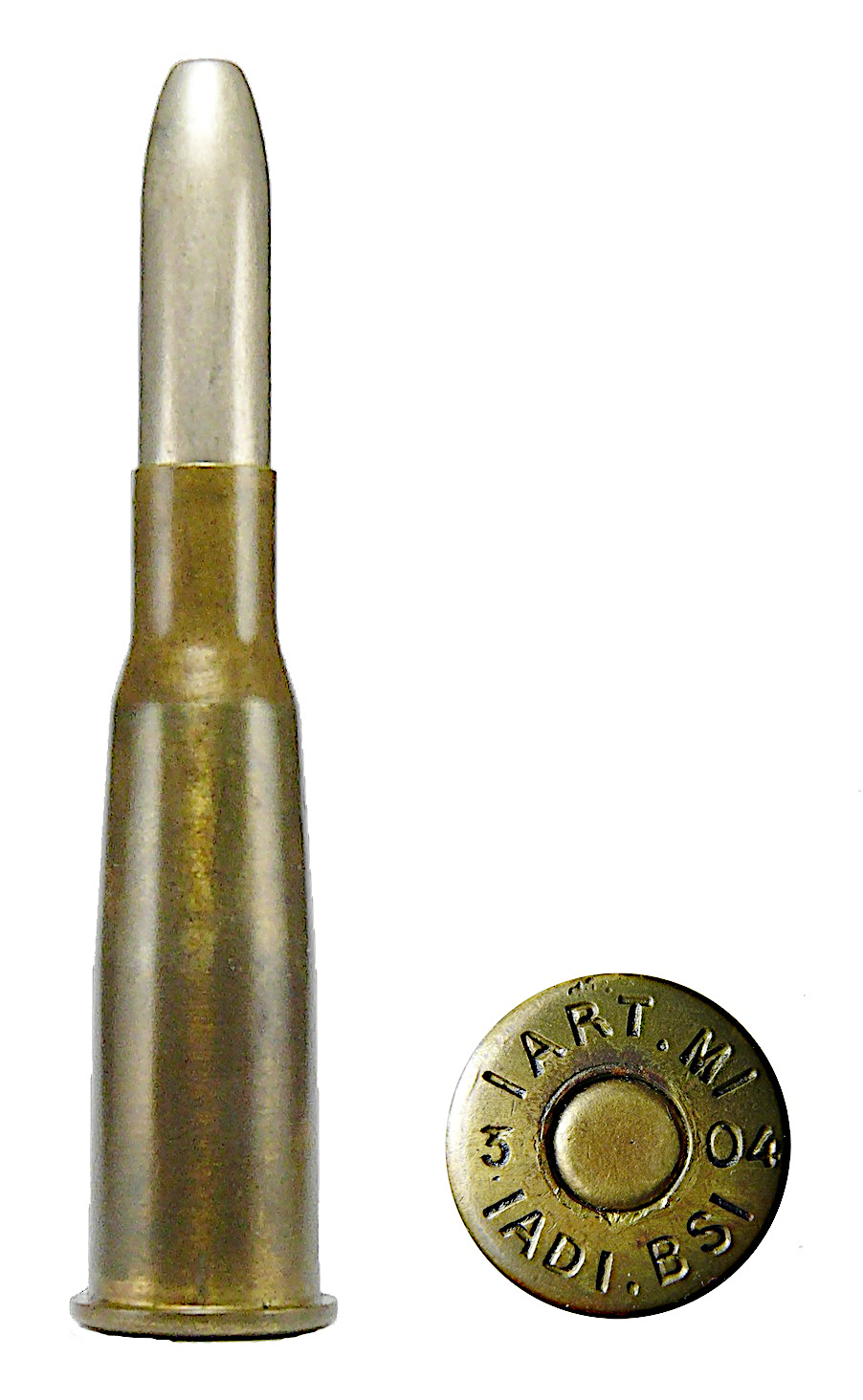
Original Mle 1886 cartridge with cupronickel-coated Balle M became the first smokeless powder cartridge to be made and adopted by any country

The Mle 1886 Lebel rifle was the first military firearm to use smokeless powder ammunition. This new propellant, made of stabilized nitrocellulose, was called "Poudre B" ("Powder B") and had been invented in 1884 by Paul Vieille. Three times as powerful as black powder, it left virtually no combustion residue. For this last reason, the new powder enabled the reduction of the caliber. The increase of the bullet speed in the barrel required a stronger bullet than the older lead bullet. New cartridges were designed where the lead was placed in a full metal jacket (invented in 1882 by Eduard Rubin) from a deformable alloy.

The French military initially planned to adopt a wholly new rifle design and spent the year 1885 determining the optimal caliber and testing the Remington-Lee rifle, which performed well during the Sino-French War. A Mannlicher rifle was to be tested in 1886 in order to compare it to the Lee, and a brand new cartridge was to be designed as well.

However, in January 1886, a new revanchist French war minister, General Georges Ernest Boulanger, cancelled these plans and requested the urgent application of these two technical breakthroughs to the design of a new infantry rifle. He appointed General Tramond in charge of the project, which had a one-year deadline.

Firstly the 11mm Gras cartridge case was necked-down into an 8mm case (similarly to how 8×60mmR Guedes was created by Portuguese a few years earlier, except that cartridge used black powder and therefore was longer), a transformation carried out by Gras and Lt. Colonel Desaleux, which necessitated a double taper handicapping French firearms design for decades to come. The repeating mechanism, derived from the French Mle 1884 Gras-Kropatschek repeating rifle, was implemented by Albert Close and Louis Verdin at the Chatellerault arsenal. The bolt's two opposed front locking lugs, inspired from the two rear locking lugs on the bolt of the earlier Swiss Vetterli rifle, were designed by Colonel Bonnet. The 8mm flat-nosed FMJ "Balle M" bullet was suggested by Tramond and designed by Lt. Colonel Nicolas Lebel after whom the rifle (and the caliber) are named. However, Lebel did not lead the team responsible for creating the new rifle. He amicably protested during his lifetime that Tramond and Gras were the two superior officers who jointly deserved that credit. Nevertheless, his name, which only designated the Balle M bullet as the "Balle Lebel," informally stuck to the entire weapon.

The Lebel was designed to be backward compatible so it could use up existing stores of parts. It used the straight trigger and horizontal bolt action from the army's single-shot 11mm Mle 1874 Gras and shared the tubular magazine from the navy's Mle 1878 (Note: Fusil de Marine Modele 1878 (French > "Navy Rifle Model 1878")) Kropatschek rifle. (Note: The rifle was designed by an Austrian, Alfred von Kropatschek. Affiliated with the Steyr factory, he invented the tubular magazine design.) The Mle 1884 (Note: Fusil d'Infanterie Modele 1884 (French > "Infantry Rifle Model 1884")) and Mle 1885 Kropatschek rifles, still chambered for the 11mm Gras black-powder cartridge, were later adopted by the army as a transitional repeating firearm. The Mle 1885 had a two-piece stock and a massive steel receiver and closely resembles the Mle 1886 Lebel.

Boulanger ordered the production of one million rifles by 1 May 1887, but his proposal was entirely unrealistic and would require impossible speed; Boulanger would be sacked the same year for provoking a war with Germany. The Lebel rifle was manufactured by three government arsenals: Châtellerault, St-Etienne and Tulle, mostly during late 1880s and early 1890s. It featured a two-piece stock and a massive receiver designed to withstand the higher pressures developed by the new smokeless powder-based cartridges.

In 1893, an improved version of the M1886 Lebel was designated Fusil Mle 1886 M 93. (Note: Fusil Modele 1886 Modifié 93 (French > "Rifle Model 1886 / Modified 1893"). A product-improved version of the Mle 1886.) Its most useful improvement was a modified bolt head which directed hot gases from ruptured cartridge cases away from the shooter's face. The firing pin and its rear knob had already been modified in 1887 while the stacking rod remained unchanged. Lastly, the fixation of the rear sight onto the barrel was substantially improved during that 1893 modification.

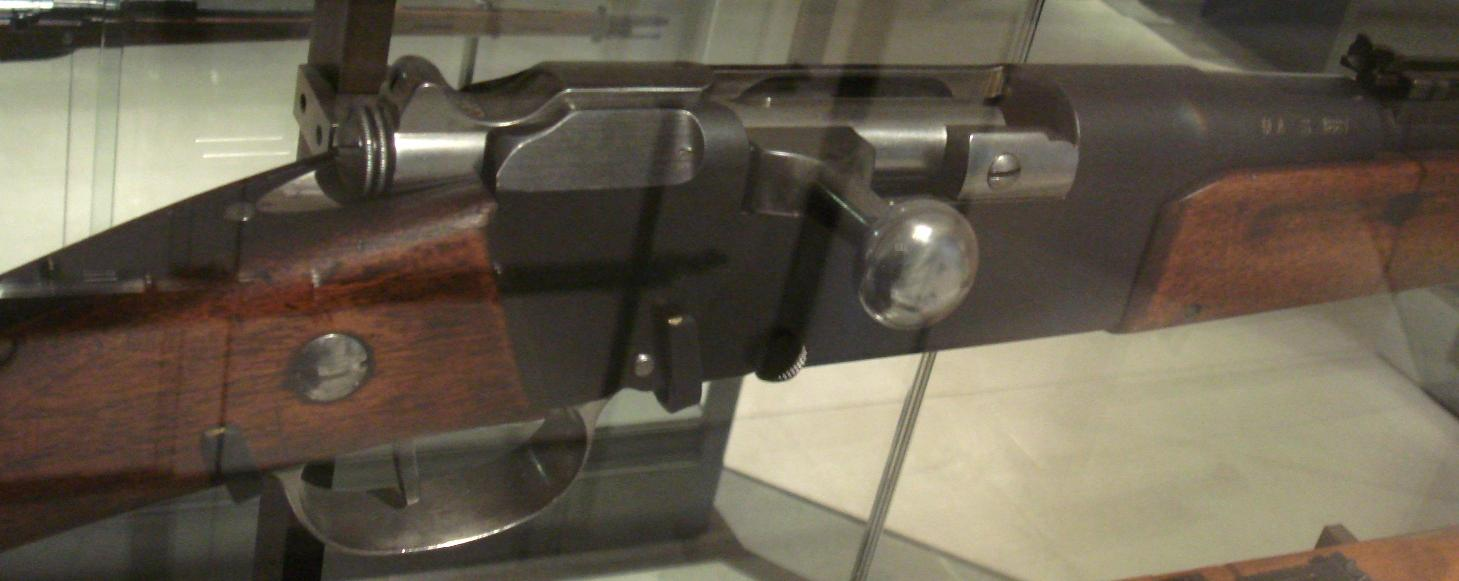
Lebel rifle breech portion

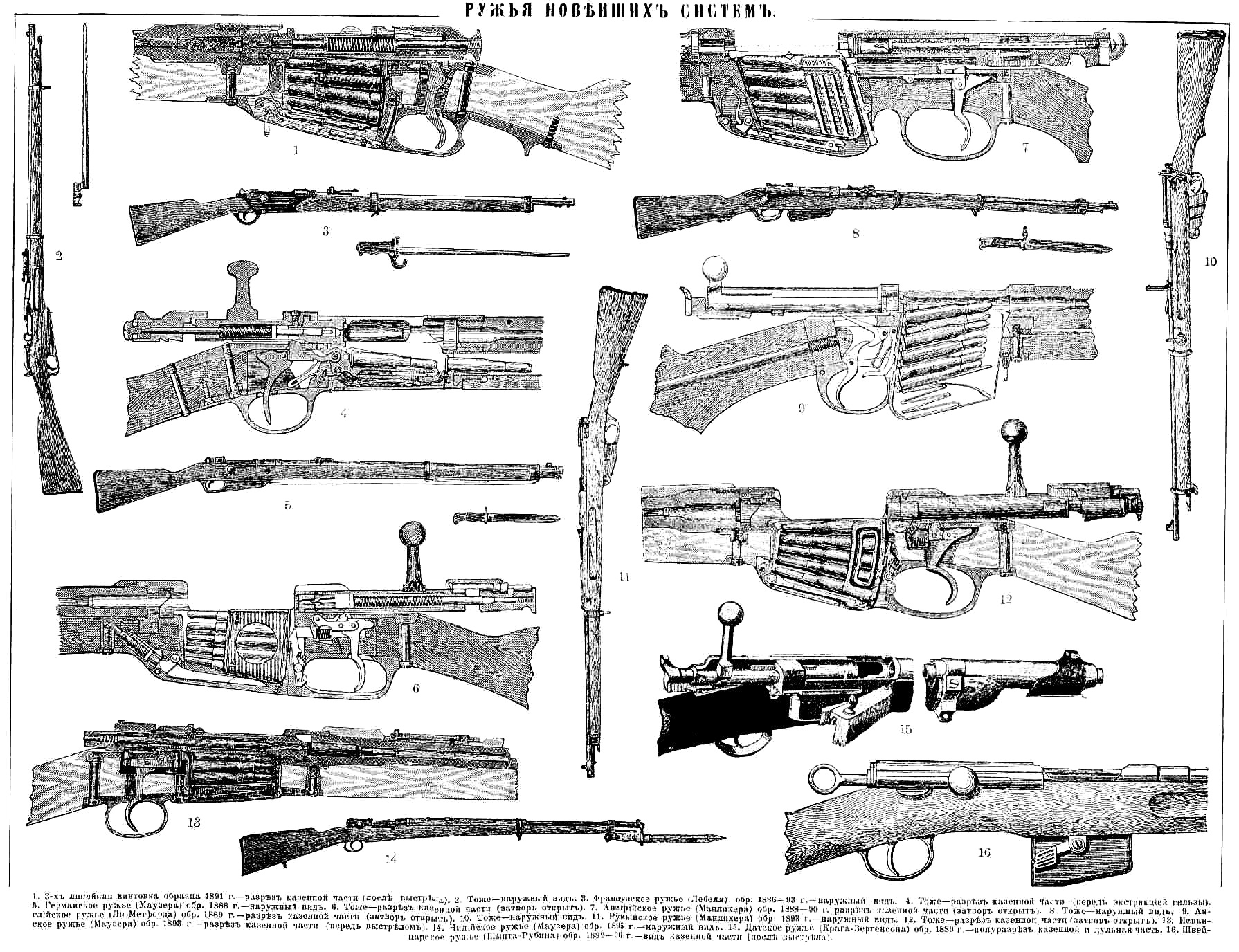
Schematic image Nos. 3 and 4

Between 1937 and 1940, a carbine-length (17.7 inch [45 cm] barrel) version of the Lebel was issued to mounted colonial troops in North Africa. This carbine variant, the Mle 1886 M93-R35, (Note: Fusil Modele 1886 Modifié 93 - Raccourci 35 (French > "Rifle Model 1886 / Modified 1893 - Shortened 1935"). On converted rifles the M93 marking was ground out and the R35 mark etched in its place.) was assembled in large numbers (about 50,000) at Manufacture d'Armes de Tulle (MAT), beginning in 1937. It used all of the Lebel's parts except for a newly-manufactured shorter barrel of carbine length. It used new sights based on that of the Berthier carbine and a shortened Lebel bayonet. The carbine's shortened tube magazine held only three rounds.

While advanced for its time, the Lebel rifle design was not without shortcomings. It became outdated much faster than any of the magazine-fed rifles of other European militaries which followed the French example during the late-1880s and 1890s. Where the service rifles of other countries could be quickly reloaded with stripper clips, bullets had to be loaded into the Lebel individually. The Lebel's tube magazine also greatly affected the rifle's balance when being fired.

== Competitors and successors ==
Upon its introduction, the Lebel rifle proved vastly superior to the Mauser M71/84, the German Army's replacement of the Model 1871 Mauser. France finished its rearmament program with the Lebel in 1889, just 18 months after Germany had completed its rifle replacement program with 780,000 M71/84s. The new French rifle alarmed Bismarck. Tests at Spandau arsenal in the winter of 1887-1888 found that the Lebel could fire 43 rounds of smokeless powder ammunition per minute compared to just 26 of black-powder ammunition for the M71/84. The inferiority of the Mauser M71/84 and its 11mm black-powder ammunition was one reason why Bismarck opposed going to war with France that winter, despite being pressed by War Minister Waldersee (another reason was that the new French De Bange field artillery, now equipped with breech loaders after the lessons of the 1870 war, both outnumbered and outperformed the Krupp C64 field guns in their rate of fire).

The Mle 1886 rifle proved to be a sturdy and serviceable weapon, but one which became rapidly outdated by advances in military rifle and ammunition designs. As early as 1888, the German Army's Rifle Testing Commission had introduced in response a completely new turnbolt magazine rifle with a spring-loaded box magazine: the Gewehr 88 "commission" rifle. Above all else, it had been designed around the first-ever rimless military cartridge using the new smokeless powder ammunition: the Patrone 88 cartridge. The early Gewehr 88 was followed 10 years later by the successful Gewehr 98 which originally was chambered for the Patrone 88. Shortly after the 1903 pattern S Patrone cartridge evolved out of and replaced the Patrone 88. The adaption of existing Patrone 88 chambered fire arms to the S Patrone was fairly easy and quickly realized.

Outclassed by Germany's Mauser rifle, the French military decided in 1909 to replace the Lebel and its rimmed cartridge with more advanced designs. While the bolt-action Berthier rifle was first issued in 1907 as a stop-gap to arm colonial troops, the French defense ministry planned to leapfrog other military forces with an advanced semi-automatic infantry rifle. This new weapon was the Meunier rifle, also known as the Fusil A6, which chambered a more powerful 7×59mm rimless cartridge. It was adopted in 1912 after an extensive competitive process. However, its manufacture, which was to begin in 1913, was suspended because of the imminent risk of war with Germany. Instead, and during World War I, the French Army chose the easier and less expensive solution of adopting a gas-operated semi-automatic rifle which incorporated some Lebel parts: the Fusil Mle 1917 RSC, once again in 8mm Lebel caliber. It was manufactured in large numbers (85,000) during 1918 and issued to select soldiers in infantry regiments. However, the Mle 1917 RSC was criticized by infantrymen as being too heavy, too long, and too difficult to maintain in the trenches. Furthermore, it also needed a special five-round clip to operate. In the end, the aged M1886 Lebel and variants of the Berthier rifle remained in service until the Armistice of November 11, 1918 and beyond.

== 8mm Lebel cartridge ==
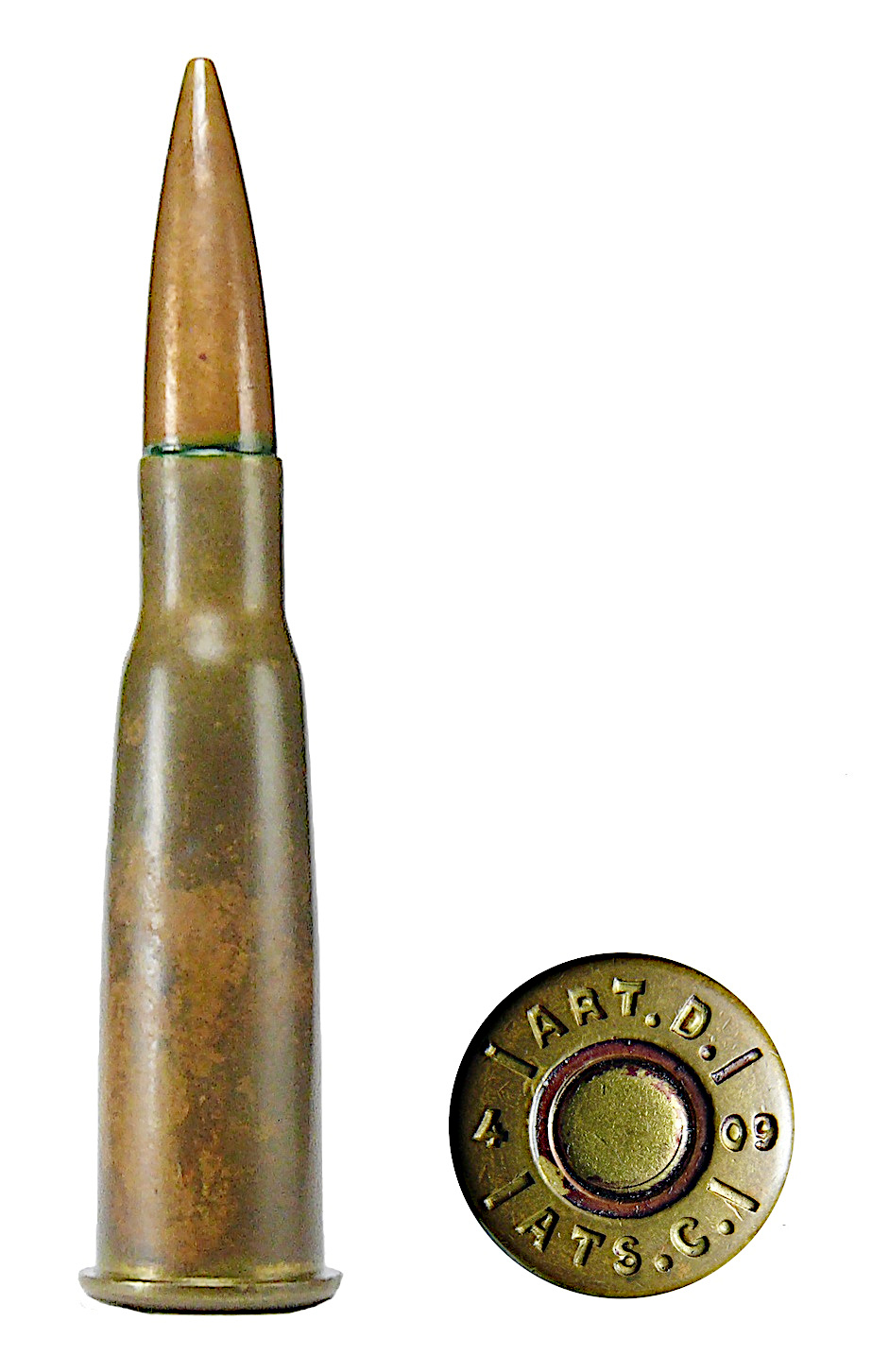
Balle D round featuring a boat-tailed spitzer bullet introduced in 1898

When it first appeared, the Lebel's 8×50R smokeless ammunition allied to its longer range and flatter trajectory brought a revolution in infantry armament. A soldier equipped with a Lebel could outrange troops carrying rifles chambered for black-powder, large-caliber lead-bullet ammunition. Using smokeless powder, he could remain virtually invisible to an enemy at longer ranges, yet locate the enemy at any range by the smoke from their rifles. He could also carry more cartridges for the same overall weight.

A new 197 gr (12.8 g) solid brass (90% copper-10% zinc) pointed (spitzer) and boat-tail bullet ("Balle D")—historically the very first boat-tailed plus spitzer rifle bullet to be invented and then widely manufactured—was adopted for the Lebel rifle in 1898 and placed in generalized service after 1901. Desaleux's own Balle D provided a flatter trajectory and increased the range of the Mle 1886 rifle to about 4,000 yards and its maximum effective wounding distance (when fired indirectly at massed area targets) to 1,800 yards. More importantly, due to the bullet's flatter trajectory, the realistic effective range of the 8mm Lebel was increased to approximately 457 yards (418 m) using open sights. The altered ballistic trajectory of the new cartridge necessitated a replacement of the Lebel's rear sights.

Firstly, in order to avoid accidental percussion inside the Lebel tube magazine and in order to receive the pointed bullet tip of the cartridge that followed, all the French-manufactured military Balle D and Balle N ammunition had a circular groove etched around each primer pocket. Moreover, the Berdan primer on each French-made military Balle D round was further protected against accidental percussion by a thick, convex primer cover which was crimped in after 1915, the "Balle D a.m."

The last type of Lebel military issue ammunition to be introduced was the Cartouche Mle 1932N, using a cupro-nickel, silver-colored, jacketed spitzer boat-tailed lead-cored bullet which was only suitable for Lebel and Berthier rifles marked "N" on top of the receiver and barrel. This 8mm Lebel heavier Balle "N" ammunition had originally been designed to increase the range of the Hotchkiss machine gun. Its manufacturing ceased in France during the late 1960s.

8mm Lebel ammunition was powerful for its time. It ranked slightly higher in muzzle energy than .303 British and slightly lower than the German 7.92×57mm Mauser cartridge. The chief negative characteristic of 8mm Lebel ammunition was the geometry of its rimmed bottlenecked case, due to the will to reuse 11mm Gras case set of tools. This adversely affected the magazine capacity and functioning of firearms, particularly in automatic weapons such as the Chauchat machine rifle. The Lebel cartridge's heavily tapered case shape and substantial rim forced weapon designers to resort to magazines with extreme curvatures as for the Chauchat machine rifle. In contrast, rimless straight-wall cartridges such as the .30-06 Springfield and the 8×57mm Mauser could easily be loaded in straight vertical magazines.

== M1886 in service ==
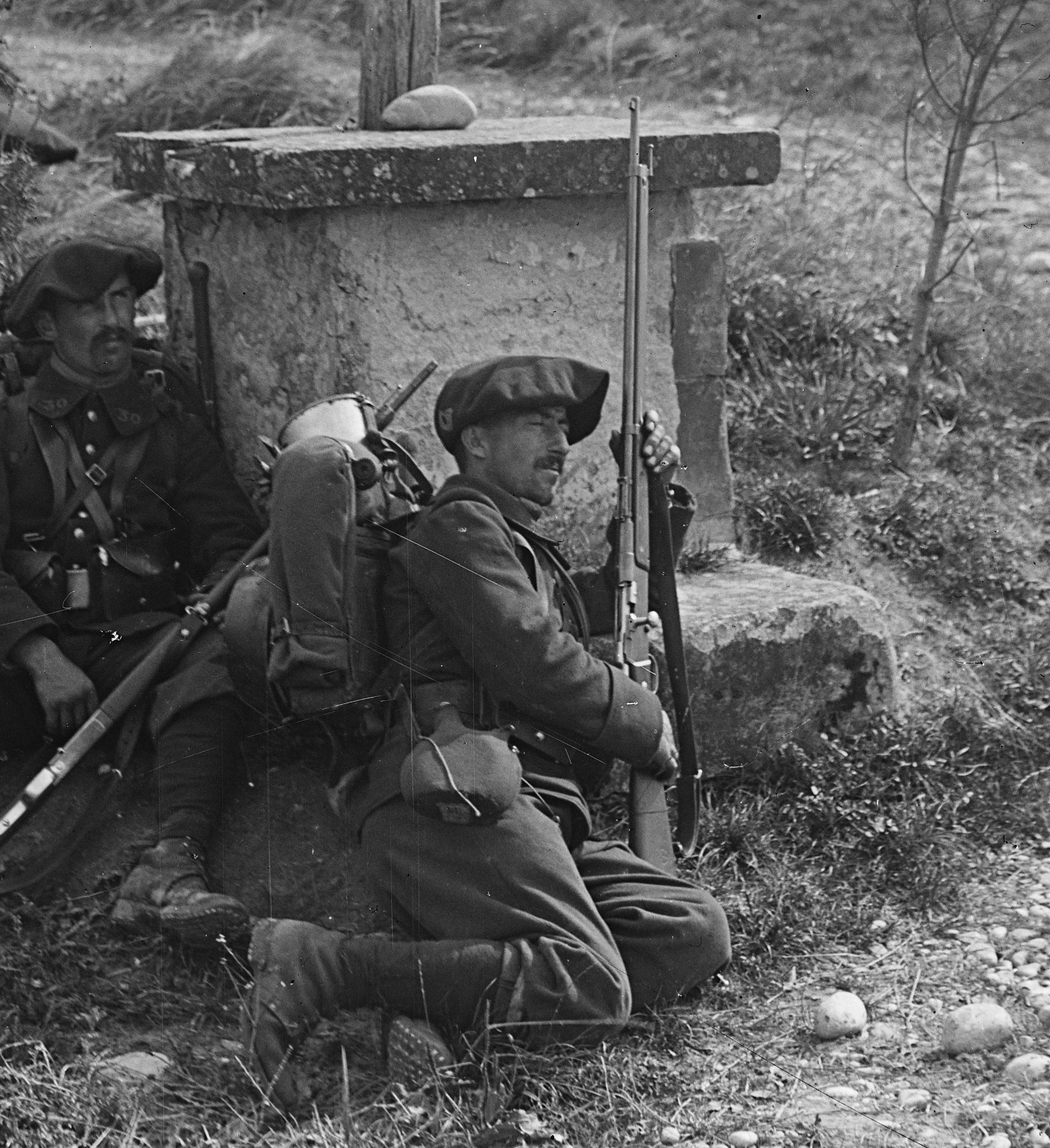
French Chasseurs with Lebel rifles in 1912.

Following the adoption of the Lebel rifle by the French Army, most other nations switched to small-bore infantry rifles using smokeless ammunition. Germany and Austria adopted new 8mm infantry rifles in 1888; Italy and Russia in 1891; and the U.S. in 1892 with the Krag rifle. The British upgraded their .303 Lee–Metford with smokeless cartridges in 1895, resulting in the .303 Lee–Enfield.

In the early years of the twentieth century, the Lebel rifle was sold in the French overseas colonies for the protection of civilians or for hunting purposes. Brand new Lebels could be purchased by authorized civilians and were featured in catalogs of the French mail-order firm Manufrance printed until 1939. Those "civilian market" Lebels sold by Manufrance were strictly identical in fit and finish to the military issue Lebels, except for the lack of a bayonet lug and no stacking rod. Furthermore, a large game hunting version of the Lebel called the "Lebel-Africain" was also offered for sale by Manufrance during the pre-World War II years. This particular version featured a shorter barrel, a turned-down bolt handle and a slimmer, better finished stock. However, it had to compete as a hunting weapon against the bolt-action Mauser and Mannlicher–Schönauer hunting rifles that became available on the French marketplace, in the early 1900s.

=== World War I ===
The Lebel rifle was a hard-hitting and solidly built weapon with a reputation for reliability in adverse environments including those of trench warfare. The Lebel rifle was quite accurate up to 300 yards and still deadly at three times that distance, thanks to the spitzer and boat tail "Balle D" bullet. Nevertheless, the Lebel rifle was not without its flaws:

- The slow-to-reload tube magazine was the Lebel's worst handicap when compared to other military rifles of that period.
- The Lebel's diminutive sights, while accurate, were low and small thus not easy to align and unprotected against shocks.
- The lack of a wooden handguard on top of the barrel led to burned hands after prolonged firing.

Nevertheless, the Lebel rifle was preferred by French infantrymen over the M1907-15 Berthier rifle with its limited three-round magazine capacity. The difference was the Lebel's larger magazine capacity in an emergency (eight rounds plus two extra rounds). In the words of David Fortier (in "Standard Catalog of Military Rifles", 2003): "The rifle shoulders nicely and is comfortable with a 13.5" length of pull. Align the hard to see sights and squeeze. When the hammer drops the Lebel slaps hard on both ends. The bolt handle is a bit out of reach due to its forward placement, but the action is fairly smooth and easy to run from the shoulder. You just have to give it a bit of a tug at the end to snap the shell carrier up ... With quality ammunition and a good bore these rifles are capable of fine accuracy. ... A rugged and reliable design, the Lebel soldiered on far longer than it should have."

During World War I (1914–1918), the Lebel remained the standard rifle of French infantry whereas the Berthier rifle—a lengthened version of the Berthier carbine—featuring a Mannlicher-style 3-round magazine was issued to colonial troops, to allied contingents in the French Army, and to the French Foreign Legion. The latter, however, demanded and obtained in 1920 being re-equipped with the Lebel rifle. The Lebel rifle could also be used with a removable VB (Viven-Bessieres) rifle grenade launcher. While the Lebel rifle was quite effective up to 300 meters with the standard Balle D boat-tail bullet ammunition, accuracy at longer distances was impaired by the existing open sights. Consequently, the APX Mle 1916 and APX Mle 1917 models of the Lebel rifle with adjustable telescopic sights were issued in numbers during WW-1, beginning in late 1916.

During World War I, Lebels were supplied to various Allied armies, such as Serbia, Russia, Belgium or United States.

The German Empire captured many Lebels, especially after the fall of Lille during the Race to the Sea. The rifles were marked Deutsches Reich and issued to rear units.

=== Post-World War I use ===
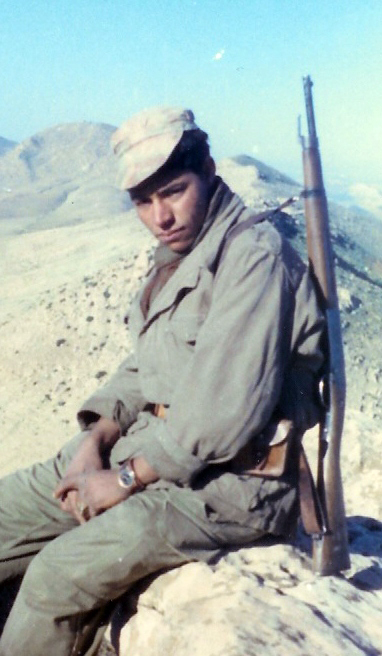
Harki with a Lebel Mle 1886 M93-R35 rifle during the Algerian War, circa 1961.

Because of negative factors during the late 1920s and 1930s—a depressed economy, reduced war budgets under the Popular Front led by Leon Blum, and neglect at high military levels, the French Army was slow to modernize its infantry weapons. For instance, production of the bolt-action MAS-36 rifle began much too late (in 1937) although its prototype had already been approved in 1929. As a result, MAS-36 rifles to equip French infantry were in short supply when World War II broke out in September 1939. Furthermore, a thoroughly tested French semi-automatic rifle was also ready to be placed into production by 1939. But due to the German occupation of France during the Second World War, five more years had to pass before this gas-operated weapon (the MAS-1939 and MAS-40) could be issued as the MAS-44, MAS-49 and MAS 1949-56 series. Another adverse result of all these delays is that Lebel rifles—many of which had since been shortened into a carbine-length version, the Mle 1886 M93R35—were still in the hands of front-line and reserve troops at the outbreak of the war. More than 3 million were available in French arsenals. There are pictures of Italian Social Republic infantrymen armed with M1886s, perhaps resurrected from a shipment provided by the French in World War I to replace the rifles lost by Italy after the Caporetto defeat, or seized later, during Italian occupation of France. Other were seen in the hands of Soviet partisans. Likewise, in 1944 the German Wehrmacht had issued some captured M1886 Lebel rifles, given the German identification code Gewehr 301(f), to some of their occupation troops in France, but in limited numbers. In 1945, during the final months of the war, many Lebel rifles were issued to Volkssturm conscripts along with any other available weapons. Some years later, during the Indochina and Algerian Wars, Lebel rifles were issued to auxiliaries or second-lines units. Captured Viet Cong weapons during the Vietnam War included the Lebel rifle. Functional Lebel rifles have been found in Iraq during the Iraqi insurgency after 2003.

== Users ==
- Algeria
- Belgium
- Chetniks: Received rifles sourced from Fascist Italy in 1943.
- Congo Free State Rifle of Force Publique
- China: Used by Yunnan Clique forces
- Czechoslovakia
- Democratic Republic of Georgia
- Ethiopian Empire: Some Ethiopian Lebels have been hand-shortened into 5-round carbines. Most likely were obtained after WW1 as surplus.
- France
- German Empire
- Nazi Germany: issued to Volkssturm units.
- Kingdom of Greece: bought during the 1919-1922 Greco-Turkish War
- Kingdom of Hejaz
- Kingdom of Italy: Supplied to the Italian Army in World War I after the Battle of Caporetto and issued to second-line units. About 9,000 were inventoried in 1942, and Italian firms produced new ammunition for them in the 1930s and 1940s.
- Qajar Iran: According to Morgan Shuster in *The Strangling of Persia* (1912), approximately 15,000 Lebel Model 1886 rifles—previously purchased by the Iranian government and stored in arsenals—were allocated to the Treasury Gendarmerie for its armament during his administration.
- Iraq: Iraqi insurgents
- Lebanon
- Monaco: Compagnie des Carabiniers du Prince
- (Poland) Second Polish Republic
- Kingdom of Romania
- Russian Empire
- Kingdom of Serbia
- Somalia
- Soviet Union
- (Spain) Second Spanish Republic
- Thailand
- Turkey
- United Kingdom: issued to Home Guard units after Dunkirk.
- United States: used during WWI
- Vietnam : used by Vietnamese National Army and Viet Minh/Viet Cong

== See also ==
- Chauchat
- List of infantry weapons of World War I
- Hotchkiss M1914 machine gun

== Bibliography ==
- "France's Wonderful Rifle; Great Performances of the New Small Arm for Infantry". The New York Times. October 15, 1889. p. 3.
- Bull, Stephen; et al. (Illustrations by Adam Hook, design by Alan Hamp) (27 May 2021). "Chapter 3: Infantry weapons in 1914". In Windrow, Martin (ed.). World War I Trench Warfare (1): 1914–16. Oxford, United Kingdom: Osprey Publishing/Bloomsbury Publishing Plc. pp. 9–12. ISBN 978-1-47285-254-0 – via Google Books.
- Guillou, Luc (1 March 2012). Sorlot, C.; Sorlot, Bertrand; Dugroleau, Stéphanie; Dupont, Régis; Barbier, Elodie; Poggioli, Antoine (eds.). "Quelques fusils Lebel atypiques". Gazette des Armes & Uniformes (in French). 40 (442). Paris, France: Régi'Arm: 26–35. ISSN 0767-869X. Archived from the original on 18 November 2013.
- de Haas, Frank; Van Zwoll, Wayne (2003). Bolt Action Rifles. Krause Publications. ISBN 0-87349-660-4. An illustrated chapter in this volume reviews in depth the Lebel and Berthier rifles (and carbines).
- Huon, Jean (1988). Military rifle and machine gun cartridges. Alexandria, Virginia: Ironside International Publishers. ISBN 0-935554-05-X. This volume (in English) provides a detailed description of all the types of 8mm Lebel ammunition, including Balle M, Balle D (a.m.) and Balle N. The 7×59mm Meunier cartridge (for the semi-automatic A6 Meunier rifle) is also illustrated and described in detail.
- Huon, Jean (1995). Proud Promise: French Autoloading Rifles 1898–1979. Collector Grade Publications. ISBN 0-88935-186-4. This volume (in English) contains a highly detailed technical "Introduction" chapter describing the Lebel rifle and its ammunition. This volume primarily describes all French semi-automatic rifles since 1898, notably the Mle 1917 and Mle 1918 semi-automatic rifles, the Meunier (A6) rifle as well as the MAS 38-39 to MAS49 and 49/56 series.
- James, Gary (October 2014). "France's Great War Masterpiece. The 1886/93 Lebel". American Rifleman. Vol. 162, no. 10. National Rifle Association.
- Krause, Keith; German, Eric G.; LeBrun, Emile; McDonald, Glenn; Jones, Richard; et al. (Illustrated by Jillian Luff, photography by Frank Benno Junghanns) (1 August 2012). Allen, Alessandra; Inowlocki, Tania; Strachan, Donald (eds.). Small Arms Survey 2012: Moving Targets. Small Arms Survey (Report) (12th ed.). Geneva, Switzerland (production)/Cambridge, United Kingdom (printing): Graduate Institute of International and Development Studies. ISBN 978-0-521-19714-4. Archived from the original on 1 October 2012 – via Cambridge University Press (printer).
- Lombard, Claude (1987). La Manufacture Nationale d'Armes de Châtellerault (1819–1968) (in French). 162 Grand Rue, Poitiers, 86000, France: Librairie Brissaud. ISBN 2-902170-55-6. This large illustrated volume (in French) contains the detailed technical history and production statistics for the Lebel rifle as well as detailed technical accounts on the Chassepot, Gras, Kropatschek and Berthier weapons and how they came to be designed and manufactured. This is regarded as the fundamental research volume on the subject. The author is a retired armament engineer who spent most of his career at Châtellerault and had full access to all the archives and the prototypes.
- Malingue, Bruce (2006). "Fusil Lebel". Le Tir Sportif au Fusil Reglementaire (in French). Crepin-Leblond. pp. 332–334. ISBN 2-7030-0265-3. The author is justifiably critical of the Lebel's sights.
- Schwing, Ned, ed. (2003). Standard Catalog of Military Firearms. Krause Publications. ISBN 0-87349-525-X. Contains an informative and detailed page dedicated to the Lebel rifle (by David Fortier).

Preceded by Fusil Gras Modèle 1874	French Army rifle 1886–1936	Succeeded by Berthier rifle MAS-36 rifle
