= List of signal grenades of the United Kingdom =

The British Army used several signal grenades from their introduction in the 20th century.

== Usage ==
The grenades were used to communicate information through pre-arranged combinations of coloured smoke and lights. Generally smoke was for daytime use and lights at night but some light producing grenades were suitable for daytime use.

== List ==
=== Rifle grenades ===
Used with rifle discharger clipped to front of rifle and propelled by blank cartridge with 30 grains of ballistite. Signal grenades were fired holding the rifle at 70 degrees, the butt on the ground and the rifle trigger uppermost. (Note: A gas port on the discharger was used to adjust range between 80 and 200 yd (73 and 183 m) when firing other types of grenades but signal grenades were used with port closed)

- No. 42 Day Signal - Four different colours of smoke candle. With a parachute.
- No. 43 Night - similar to No.42 but with coloured stars. The stars are separated by 12 ft of cord and burn simultaneously
- No. 45 Night Signal - similar to 42 and 43 but the star changes colour during use e.g. white-red-white or red-green-red
- No. 48 Day or Night Locality Signal - four flash signals which fire sequentially with short delay between each.
- No. 52 - as No. 43 but three white illuminating stars

Rodded grenade type where a 15-inch long rod at base of grenade is inserted into the rifle (Note: The rifle was given reinforcement in the form of wire binding round the fore end of the gun over 5 inches) and fired from barrel with a blank cartridge of 43 grains cordite. This was older method of firing grenades.

- No. 31 Day Signal - smoke candle and parachute
- No. 32 Night Signal - 2-3 coloured illuminating stars and parachute
- No. 35 Night Signal - changing light and parachute similar to No. 45
- No. 51 Day or Night Signal - white illuminating stars and parachute. same as No. 52

=== Hand grenades ===
- No. 83 Signal Smoke Grenade - post Second World War
- L35A1 Signal Smoke
