= Nicolas Lebel =

French firearm designer (1838–1891)

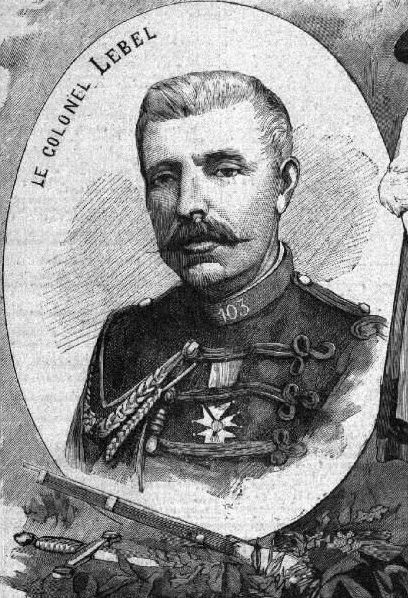
- Nicolas Lebel (1890)
- Born: Nicolas Lebel; 18 August 1838; Saint-Mihiel (Meuse), France
- Died: 6 May 1891 (aged 53); France
- Occupation: Inventor

Colonel Nicolas Lebel (18 August 1838 – 6 May 1891) was a French firearm designer, after whom the French military's Lebel rifle was named.

== Biography ==
Nicolas Lebel was born in Saint-Mihiel (Meuse) near Verdun. Interested by the prospects of a military career he enrolled in the Saint-Cyr Military Academy in 1855.

In 1857, he joined the 58th Infantry Regiment as a second lieutenant. During the Franco-Prussian War of 1870–1871, he was a captain and company commander. In September 1870, he was captured after the Sedan encirclement and became a prisoner-of-war.

Released from captivity after the Treaty of Frankfurt, he found a command in Tours, during the years of intense reorganization of the French Army which followed the 1871 defeat. He was appointed major in 1876, and dedicated himself to the improvement of infantry weaponry. His competence was soon recognized and in 1883, the Minister for War, General Thibaudin, entrusted him to direct the army's École Normale de Tir. The E.N.T. was the army's training center dedicated to improve shooting performance and recommend small arms improvements.

In March 1884 he was made a member of the Commission des Armes à Répétition or Commission for repeating firearms. This commission was presided at the time by General Baptiste Tramond and included Colonel Basile Gras, Colonel Bonnet, Lt-Colonel Lebel, Castan, de Tristan, Captain Desaleux and last but not least Paul Vieille, the inventor of smokeless powder. It is this commission which formulated and supervised the execution of the fusil mle 1886 infantry rifle prototype. This project was carried out within slightly more than one year, between January 1886 and the date of formal adoption: April 1887. Lt-Colonel Lebel's direct contribution was the full-metal-jacket bullet or balle Lebel which had been formulated and extensively tested at the École Normale de Tir under his direction. He had been inspired by the promising results obtained somewhat earlier by Major Eduard Rubin of the Swiss Army who had invented the first copper-jacketed rifle bullets in 1882. Without the jacketed "Balle Lebel" ("Lebel bullet") the new Mle 1886 rifle's performance with Paul Vieille's smokeless powder, which imparted much higher velocities than black powder, would have been impossible to achieve.

The new Fusil Mle 1886 was soon and informally designated as Fusil Lebel (Lebel rifle) "against the protestations of the Commission, including Colonel Lebel himself" as quoted verbatim from Challeat's classic Histoire Technique de l'Artillerie de Terre en France pendant un siècle, published in 1935. The historical record shows that the Lebel rifle was the result of teamwork carried out against time and under great pressure exerted from above by War Minister General Boulanger. The original bullet or "Balle M" designed under Colonel Lebel's direction was flat nosed in order to pose no risk of accidental ignition in the Lebel's tube magazine. The "Balle M" bullet has a full metal jacket made of cupro-nickel and a lead core. Its weight is 232 grains (15.0 g). Its muzzle velocity is 2,000 ft/s (600 m/s). Its maximum range is 3,500 yards (3,200 m). It was propelled by 46 grains (3.0 g) of the new smokeless "poudre B". Its ballistic properties were superior to anything else in existence at the time (1887).

Lebel was promoted to the rank of full colonel in 1887 but, because of cardiac problems, he took early retirement in 1890 and died on 6 May 1891 at the age of 53.

He was decorated with the rank of Commander of the Order of the Legion of Honor.
