= Berthier rifle =

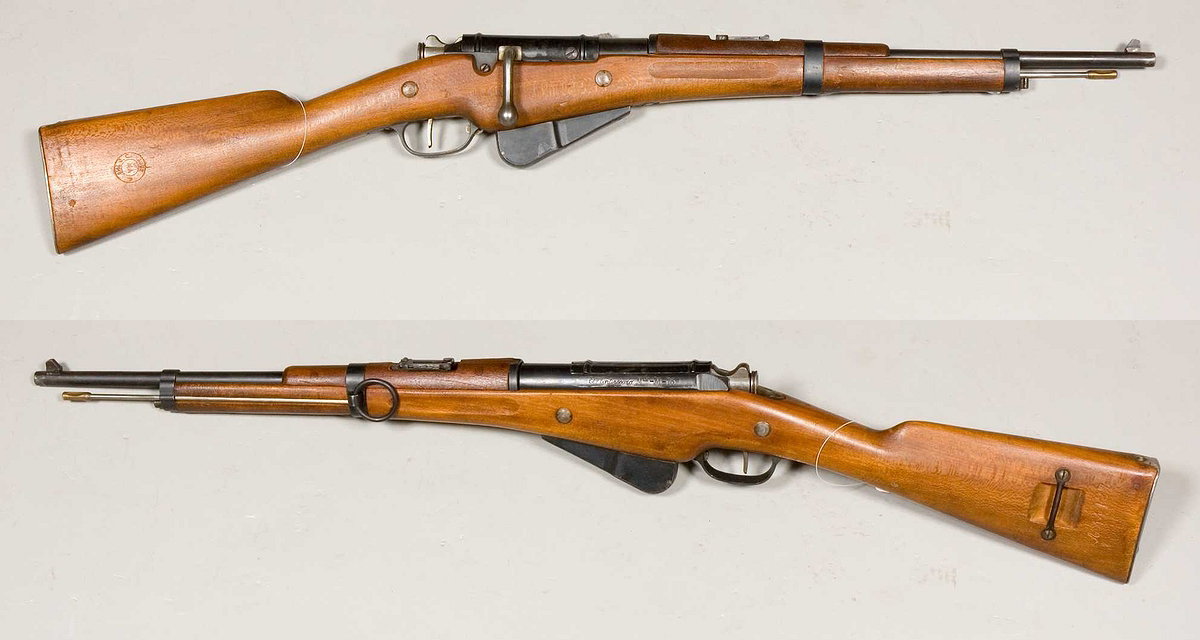
- A Berthier M1916 Carbine on display at the Swedish Army Museum
- Type: Bolt-action rifle Sniper rifles
- Place of origin: France

Service history
- In service: 1890–1960s
- Used by: See Users
- Wars: World War I Polish-Soviet War; Greco-Turkish War; Rif War (1920); Second Italo-Ethiopian War; Spanish Civil War; World War II; First Indochina War; Algerian War

Production history
- Designer: André Virgile Paul Marie Berthier (1858-1923)
- No. built: 2,000,000+

Specifications
- Mass: 3.1 kg (6.8 lb) (Mle 1892 Carbine); 3.6 kg (7.9 lb) (Mle 1902); 3.81 kg (8.4 lb) (Mle 1907/15); 3.25 kg (7.2 lb) (Mle 1892/M16); 4.195 kg (9.25 lb) (Mle 1907/15-M16); 3.7 kg (8.2 lb) (Mle 1907/15-M34)
- Length: 1,306 mm (51.4 in); 945 mm (37.2 in) (Carbines); 1,125 mm (44.3 in) (Mle 1902); 1,075 mm (42.3 in) (Mle 1907/15-M34)
- Barrel length: 803 mm (31.6 in); 450 mm (18 in) (Carbines); 635 mm (25.0 in) (Mle 1902); 570 mm (22 in) (Mle 1907/15-M34)
- Cartridge: 8×50mmR Lebel; 7.5×54mm French (Mle 1907/15-M34)
- Caliber: 8mm 7.5mm
- Action: Bolt action
- Muzzle velocity: 701 m/s (2,300 ft/s); 637 m/s (2,090 ft/s) (Carbine); 850 m/s (2,800 ft/s) (Mle 1907/15-M34)
- Feed system: 3-or 5-round Mannlicher-type en bloc magazine, clip fed (Mle 1907/15-M34)

The Berthier rifles and carbines were a family of bolt-action small arms in 8mm Lebel, used in the French Army, and French Colonial Forces, from the 1890s to the beginning of World War II (1940). After the introduction of the Lebel rifle in 1886, the French Army wanted a repeating carbine using the same ammunition as the Lebel to replace their single shot carbine based on the Gras rifle. At the time, many armies based their carbines on their standard rifle model, however the Lebel rifle's tube magazine made it difficult to follow this approach. The Modele 1890 Berthier Cavalry Carbine addressed this issue by combining a modified Lebel action with an en-bloc clip magazine. With its successful cavalry introduction, the Berthier would go on to be produced in many different carbine and full-length rifle versions.

== History and usage ==
The Berthier was originally introduced as a partial replacement for the French 1886 Lebel rifle. The Lebel, a revolutionary concept at the time of its introduction because of its smokeless high-velocity, small-caliber cartridge, still used a tube-fed magazine and other details carried over from black-powder designs. By 1900, the Lebel was already obsolete in comparison to other newer magazine-fed rifles introduced by Mauser, Lee, and Mannlicher. With its tube-fed magazine, the Lebel was long, ungainly and distinctly muzzle-heavy when loaded, difficult to manufacture, and overly complex in construction. Most notably, the Lebel proved very slow to reload compared to newer rifle designs. On horseback, carbine versions of the Lebel proved almost impossible to reload while on the move, while shortening the barrel to carbine length resulted in feeding problems due to an unreliable tube magazine that were never resolved. Mounted security forces, cavalry units, and artillery units in colonial services were forced to use single shot Mle 1874 carbines, most not even converted to fire the modern 8mm Lebel ammunition, against insurrectionist forces who were sometimes better armed than government forces. A replacement for the Lebel was clearly required, at least for mounted troops.

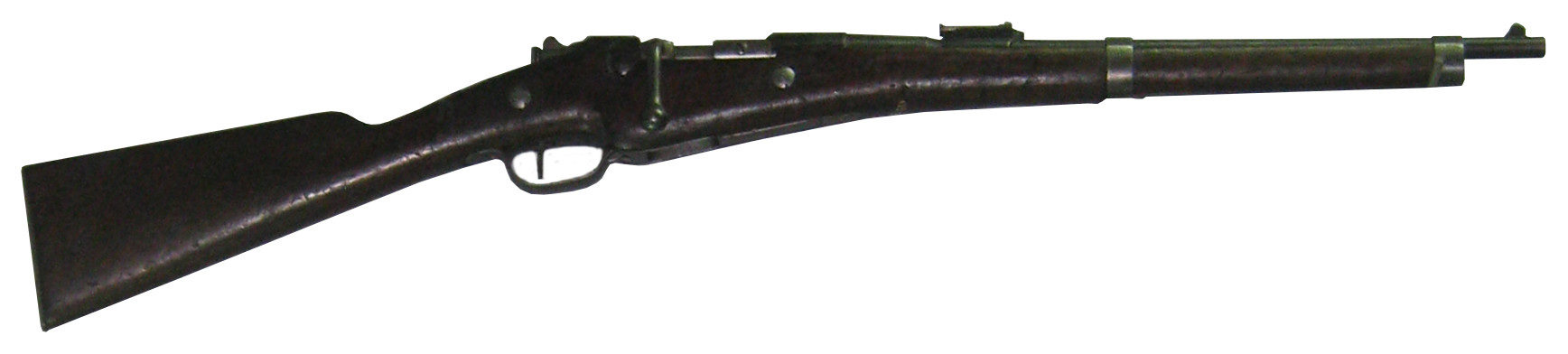
Modèle 1890 Berthier

Named after its inventor, André Virgile Paul Marie Berthier (1858-1923), a French civilian engineer in the Algerian railways, the Berthier's three-shot vertical-feed Mannlicher-type en bloc magazine could be loaded by clips, greatly increasing reloading speed, a particular convenience for cavalry and other mounted troops. A spring-loaded arm fed cartridges to the breech, and when all cartridges had been loaded, the empty clip fell out by gravity through an opening in the bottom of the magazine. The small 3-shot magazine capacity was adopted after field testing, where the cavalry expressed a preference for a non-protruding magazine that did not interfere with the balance or handling of the rifle. The Berthier carbine was adopted by the French Army on March 14, 1890, and a short rifle version of the Berthier rifle was adopted in 1907. French records indicate that in excess of two million Berthier rifles and carbines were manufactured by the French State manufactures supplemented by civilian industries. Like the Mle 1886 lebel, the Berthier lacked a mechanical safety; French training protocols called for soldiers to carry their rifle with loaded magazine but without a round in the chamber until ordered to load rifles by an NCO or officer in charge. France employed large numbers of colonial troops with limited technological experience, and since colonial combat conditions in North Africa and Indochina were extremely hard on service weapons, carrying with an empty chamber was considered superior to reliance on a mechanical safety, since a rifle with no round in the chamber could never go off, unlike a rifle whose safety was not properly engaged or had malfunctioned due to grit or wear.

At the outbreak of World War I, the Model 1907 Berthier rifle was modified for mass manufacturing, resulting in the Mdle 07/15. The sights, barrel band, and stacking hook were simplified to increase the rate of production. While the original 1907 rifle incorporated a cruciform bayonet, the 07/15 was modified to take the same bayonet as the Lebel, simplifying supply. The turned-down bolt handle was changed to a simpler straight bolt.

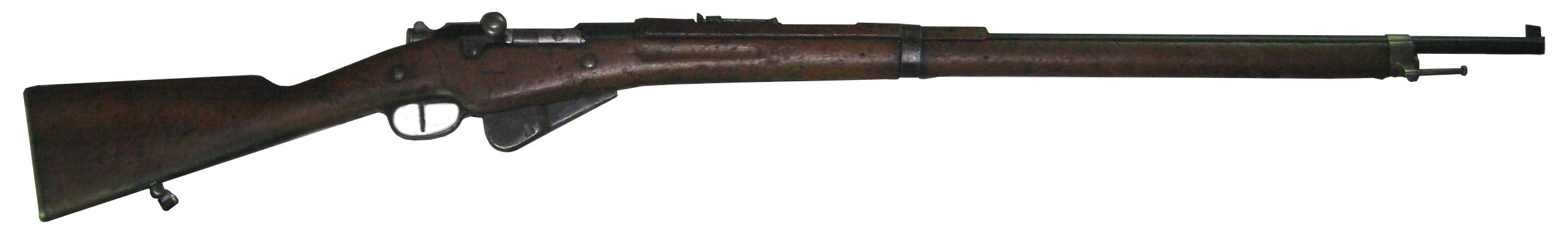
Modèle 1907/15 M16 Berthier

During World War I, it was quickly recognized that the Berthier's three-shot magazine was simply too small in comparison to foreign weapons, requiring too-frequent reloading. Additionally, it was found that trench mud and grit could enter the weapon through the opening in the bottom of the magazine. To correct these issues, the Model 1916 Berthier rifle was introduced with a five-round en-bloc clip. The clip discharge opening at the bottom of the protruding magazine was replaced by a spring loaded trapdoor to keep out dirt and debris. This improved 5-shot design was then fitted to existing rifle and carbine-length Berthier models (Mle 1907/15, Mle 1890M16, 1892M16 and Mle 1916 mousquetons). In response to changing combat situations at the front, which had evolved from a war of maneuever into static trench warfare and frequent night raids, many Berthier rifles were also fitted with sights designed specifically for close range or night combat, using radium paint to improve visibility in poor light or darkness.

The Kingdom of Greece, fighting alongside the allies, received large number of Berthiers during the war, especially Mle 07/15 rifles and Mle 1892 M16 carbines.

=== After World War I ===
Many Model 1916 rifles and carbines were produced too late to see service in World War I, but were used after the war, particularly in colonial service.

The Greek Army of Asia Minor received 10,000 Berthier Mle 07/15 and Mle 1892 M16 to fight against the Turks.

Czechoslovakia received large numbers of Mle 07/15 rifles after World War I.

The Spanish Republic received between 37,500 and 50,000 Berthier rifles and carbines from Poland during the Spanish Civil War.

=== World War II ===
Berthier rifles and carbine continued in service during the Second World War in all branches of French service, including infantry and mounted units. Colonial and Foreign Legion forces in particular continued to use the Mle 1916 Berthier due to a shortage of the new MAS-36 bolt-action rifle. Despite the advent of the MAS-36, the French Army did not have enough of the new rifles to equip even half of its frontline interior troops. Berthier Model 1916 (original and converted) 5-shot rifles and carbines saw action in both France and Norway. After the fall of France in 1940, the Berthier could be found in service with both Vichy and Free French units. Selected Berthier Mle 1907/15-M16 (Fusil Mle 1916) rifles were fitted with telescopic sights and used, along with scoped Mle 1886/M93 rifles, by marksmen detailed to serve with some French units. In September 1938, the French Army also introduced the corps franc, special formations of infiltration and deep reconnaissance soldiers formed into l'equipe or assault teams. These elite reconnaissance and infiltration troops were equipped with a variety of small arms, including a combat knife, a handgun, grenades, and Berthier Mle 1892/M16 carbines.

The Mle 1890M16, 1892M16 and Mle 1916 mousquetons) were again used by French Foreign Legion and some colonial infantry and cavalry units, including the French Spahis. The Greek Army still fielded Berthier Mle 07/15M16 rifles during the Greco-Italian War, most being used in second-line units. The Third Reich issued many captured Berthier carbines to German occupation forces in France, mainly to Atlantic Wall units, the M34 variant received the German identification code Gewehr 241(f). Some were used by police units fighting partisans in various eastern European countries including security units operating at the rear of German front lines in Soviet Union.

=== Post-war usage ===
After World War II, Berthier rifles were retired, except for some rifles held by indigenous units and reserve forces. However, the Berthier carbine with a five-round clip (Mle 1890 M16, 1892 M16 and Mle 1916 mousquetons) was again utilized by French Foreign Legion and some overseas colonial infantry and cavalry units, including the French Spahis, French motorized cavalry units, and frontier border guards. Mdle 1916 and later versions of Berthier carbines were retained in some French law enforcement units, e.g. the Compagnies Republicaines de Securite (CRS) as late as the 1980s.

During the Greek Civil War, partisans were still using Berthier rifles.

Việt Minh forces used both the Mle 1902 and the mousqueton (Mle 1892 and M16).

== Design ==
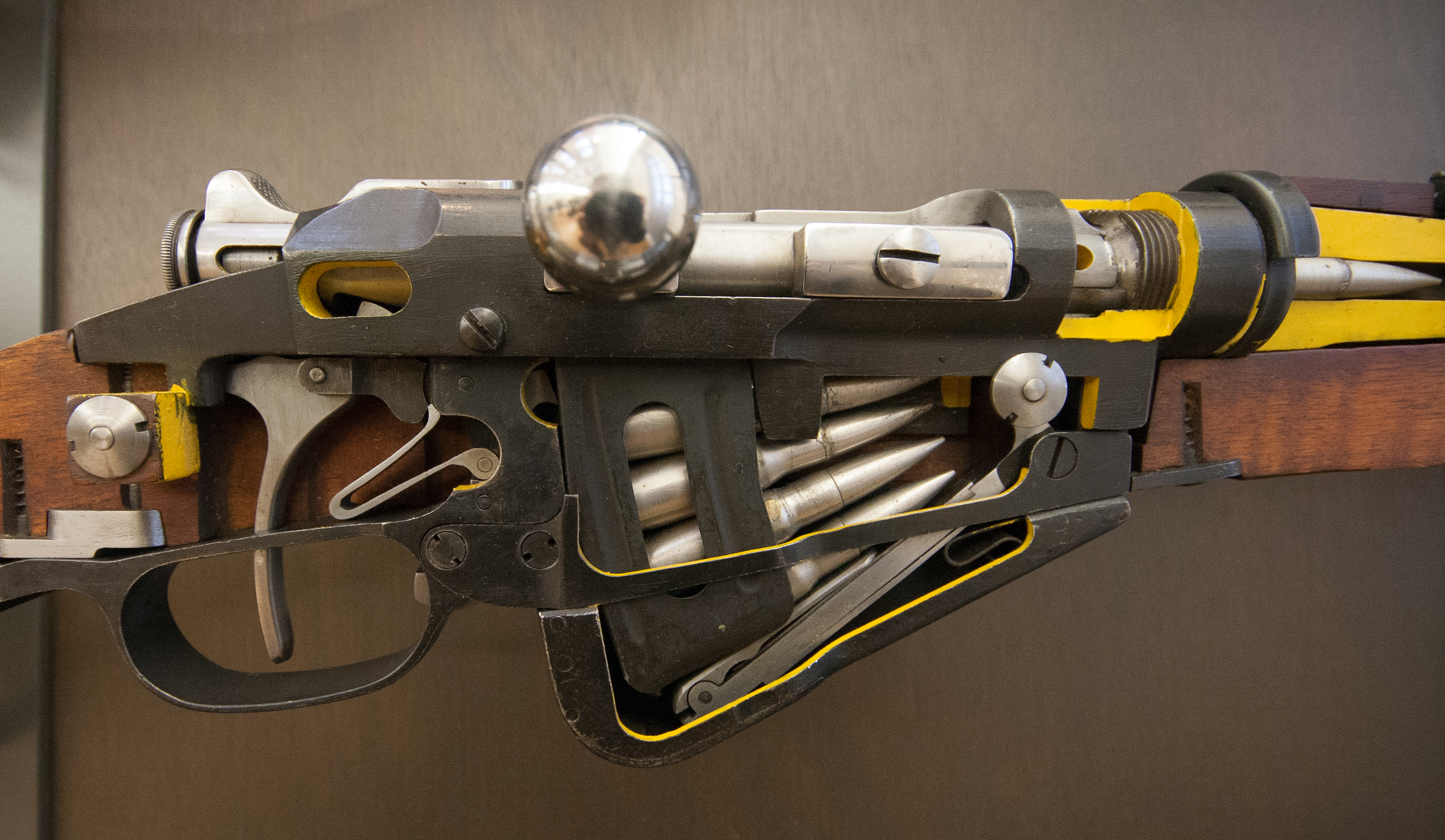
Cutaway in the museum of MAS, showing how a Berthier operates

Berthiers were chambered in the same cartridge as the Lebel, the 8x50mm Lebel, which was the first to be loaded with smokeless powder (Poudre B). The Berthier used a simplified and smoother version of the Lebel bolt, but the main differences were a great reduction in weight, moving parts, tooling and an increase in operating speed. This is due in no small part to the magazine system, which was redesigned more similar to a Mannlicher-type design, where it was loaded with 3-round (later 5-round) clips, chargers, or packets. Though the Lebel's original capacity of 8 rounds was reduced, the Berthier was more popular due to the efficiency of operation and the increased speed of reloading, which more closely matched the capabilities of foreign rifles such as the Mauser and the Lee-Enfield. The occasional use, outside France, of the term "Mannlicher" to designate weapons of the Berthier system is due to the "en bloc" clip disposition which was borrowed from the real Mannlicher rifles and carbines. Otherwise the Berthier weapons, and particularly their bolts, are not derived from Mannlicher rifles or carbines but rather from the Lebel rifle system. Like Carcanos, Berthiers; other than using a Mannlicher-type magazine system, bear no other resemblance to true Mannlichers and should not be addressed as such.

Berthier rifles and carbines do not have any form of applied (mechanical) safety. If the bolt is cocked and closed and the trigger is pulled, the firing pin will be released. Extreme care must be exercised when handling a loaded Berthier rifle or carbine. To safely unload a Berthier rifle or carbine once a clip has been inserted in the magazine, point the rifle in a safe direction, open the bolt and depress the clip release button located at the front of the trigger guard. The clip should spring up and out of the rifle. If it appears to stick, insert a finger into the opening at the bottom of the magazine and gently push up on the bottom of the follower, pushing the clip release button at the same time. The loaded clip should slide up out of the magazine.

== Variants ==
=== Berthier Mousqueton (carbine) ===
The Berthier design began as the "Mousquetons Berthier" - a series of bolt-action cavalry and artillery carbines with distinctly different actions from the Mle 1886/M93 8mm Lebel rifle. For instance, the Berthier carbine's bolt lugs lock vertically into the receiver instead of horizontally as in the Lebel rifle. Berthier carbines were first issued in 1890 and 1892, and had been designed by André Virgile Paul Marie Berthier, an engineer at the French Algerian Railways, to be used with standard 8mm Lebel ammunition.

The Berthier design was introduced as a replacement for the various aging Mle 1874 Gras single-shot carbines - still standard for French cavalry, artillery, and gendarme forces even after the introduction of the Mle 1886/M93 Lebel. Prior experiments with several carbine versions of the Lebel action proved unacceptably heavy and slow to load while on horseback. While retaining most of the action's strong points, the Berthier carbine improved on the earlier Mle 1886 rifle by using a one-piece stock and a Mannlicher-style, charger-loaded en bloc 3 shot clip. These Berthier carbines were progressively allocated to all cavalry, artillery and gendarmerie troops during the 1890s.

After the adoption of the new Lebel Model 1886 rifle, French military authorities attempted to develop a carbine version of the rifle for mounted troops. A prototype carbine was created by simply shortening the existing barrel, forearm, and magazine tube of the Mle 1886 rifle. However, this design was soon rejected for insufficient accuracy, as well as being too slow and cumbersome to reload with single cartridges while on horseback. In response, the French Army held a series of rifle trials in 1887 to select a suitable carbine. One of the prototypes submitted was designed by André Virgile Paul Marie Berthier, a mechanical engineer in the Compagnie Bône-Guelma (one of the five subsidiary companies of the Algerian Railway System). Berthier's design for the original carbine was adopted in 1890 as the Mle 1890, utilizing a 3-round en-bloc clip. The first Berthier carbine came into production as the "Carabine de Cavalerie Modèle 1890", which was officially adopted for service on March 14, 1890. The main production facilities were the Manufacture d'Armes de St Etienne or MAS and the Manufacture d'Armes de Chatellerault or MAC. The search for a suitable small arm for mounted troops was given greater urgency by the Germans' development of the Karabiner Modell 1888, a carbine variant of the Gewehr 1888. It was issued to essentially all French artillery and cavalry troops. As the high Command appreciated the performance of the Mle 1890 Berthier carbine, a second version was specifically produced for artillery service, the " Mousqueton Mle 1892" which could mount a short blade bayonet and thus had a re-designed forend stock. However it continued to feature the 3-round En-bloc clip of the Model 1890 carbine. During the First World War it became obvious that the 3-round clip was a handicap compared to German short weapons such as the German Kar98AZ which could be charged with a 5-round clip.

The Berthier carbines (and later the rifles) used a lighter, streamlined receiver and a one-piece stock that departed from the Lebel Mle 1886/M93 rifle system. For instance, the locking lugs present on the bolt of Berthier weapons lock into the receiver vertically, instead of horizontally as in the Lebel rifle. Like the Mle 1886/M93, the Berthier carbine was designed for the 8mm Lebel cartridge, but it was loaded by a three-round en-bloc Mannlicher-style clip. In line with the usual Mannlicher magazine design, designers included a large opening at the bottom of the magazine well, in part to verify if the carbine was loaded with a charger of cartridges. During World War I, after complaints from combat troops regarding the limited capacity of the 3-round charger and mud ingress into the well opening, the Berthier's magazine was increased to hold a 5-round "en bloc" charger. Furthermore, a hinged metal plate covering the bottom opening of the magazine well was added. The final result was the Mle 1892 M16 5-shot carbine which was well received, but did not appear on the front lines until the summer of 1918. Though inferior overall to Mauser's double-column box magazines, the Berthier weapons had to retain the Mannlicher en bloc system, as the rimmed and tapered 8mm Lebel cartridge could not feed properly from a Mauser-style box magazine. The Berthier Mle 1892 M16 carbine, with a 5-round charger, had a deserved reputation of solidity and reliability that kept it in service until the early 1960s.

=== Fusil Mle 1902 and Mle 1907 ===
After the success of the Berthier carbines or mousquetons, two full-length Berthier rifles were introduced during the years preceding World War I. They were the fusil Mle 1902 ("rifle, model of 1902") and the fusil Mle 1907, which were issued respectively to Indochinese and Senegalese Tirailleur troops. Lighter and easier to handle and load than the Mle 1886/M93 Lebel rifle, the Berthier rifles proved more suitable for offhand shooting and easier to maintain in tropical environments. In comparison to the Mle 1886 Lebel, the Berthier's sights were also wider, higher and more substantial. Like their shorter carbine counterparts, these Berthier rifles also featured a Mannlicher-type 3-round en bloc clip-loaded magazine and used 8 mm Lebel ammunition. The Mle 1902 and Mle 1907 were made on special order and in small numbers (altogether about 5,000 rifles) by the Manufacture d'Armes de Châtellerault.

=== World War I and the Fusil Mle 1907/15 ===
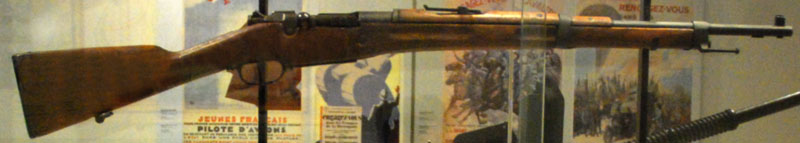
Mle 1907/15-M34 Berthier carbine

During World War I, a modified version of the 3-round clip Mle 1907 rifle called Fusil Mle 1907/15 was manufactured in large numbers (altogether 435,000 rifles) and issued to colonial troops, to the French Foreign Legion and to many minor allies (e.g. Russian Legion in France, Serbia, Greece, American Expeditionary Force African-American regiments detached to the French Army). It was also issued to some French regular infantry regiments after 1916 in order to bring relief to an endemic shortage of the Lebel rifle although well over 2 million Lebel rifles had already been produced between 1887 and 1917. Both the MAS (Manufacture d'armes de Saint-Étienne) and the MAC (Manufacture d'armes de Châtellerault) were the principal state contractors for the Mle 1907/15 rifle. French civilian contractors (Automobiles Delaunay-Belleville, Établissement Continsouza and Manufacture Parisienne d'Armes et de Mecanique Generale) also participated massively in the industrial production of the Mle 1907/15 rifle.

Remington UMC also contracted to produce a French Army order for 200,000 Mle 1907/15 rifles. Although very well finished, the Remington order was rejected by French Government acceptance inspectors, who alleged that the rifles did not meet French barrel rifling and chamber dimensional standards. The contract was canceled after approximately half of the rifles were manufactured; and those rifles were sold on the private market. Rifles issued to American 'African-American soldiers of the US 93rd Division', were of French manufacture and not US made (B. Canfield, US Weapons of WW1). Many of these rifles subsequently appeared on the surplus market in the United States, often converted for hunting or sporting purposes. These rifles hold special significance to African-American historians. In combat service, most infantrymen found the Berthier rifles and carbines, with their one-piece stocks and fast-loading en bloc magazine, to be an improvement. However, the limited ammunition capacity of the Berthier Mle 1907/15's magazine (3 rounds) was viewed as a great disadvantage by troops in close contact with the enemy or participating in assaults or trench raids.

In response, French military authorities introduced a modified Berthier rifle in 1916, designated Fusil Mle 1907/15-M16 but generally called the 1916 rifle (Fusil Modele 1916). The new rifle had a re-designed magazine well, which now could hold "en-bloc" clips with a 5-round capacity, though they would still accept the original 3-round chargers. These rifles saw service in all branches of the French army mostly after 1918. They were still used by Compagnies Republicaines de Securite or C.R.S. until the 1960s for law enforcement purposes. The Mle 1916 Berthier infantry rifle only appeared on the front lines in small numbers during the late summer of 1918. With its greater cartridge capacity, it was better received than the Mle 1907/15 rifle and later became widely issued to infantry troops during the post-war years after their production had intensified. Nevertheless, some commanders continued to lobby for reissuance of the older Mle 1886/M93 Lebel for their infantry troops. After World War I, the French Foreign Legion, which carried the 3-shot Mle 1907-15 during most of its post-1916 combat operations, was re-equipped with the older Mle 1886/M93 Lebel rifle.

The most successful and long-lived variant of the Berthier system was the short and handy carbine version of the five-shot Mle 1916 Berthier rifle, designated "'Mousqueton Berthier Mle 1892/M16". Contrary to the Mle 1916 Berthier five-shot infantry rifle whose manufacture had barely started during the late summer of 1918, the mass production (over 800.000 "mousquetons") of the Berthier Mle 1916 five-shot carbines had begun much earlier, in May 1917, at the Manufacture d'Armes de Chatellerault (MAC). The Berthier M-16 five-shot carbine immediately proved to be very popular with mounted cavalry, artillery, and reconnaissance troops. It was still in service with some French law enforcement units as late as the 1960s.

After World War I, the French military sought to replace the 8mm Lebel cartridge, which was poorly suited to large-capacity rifle magazines and to automatic or semi-automatic weapons. After considerable delay, a modern 7.5mm mle 1929 rimless cartridge was finally introduced for the FM 24/29 light machine gun. Berthier rifles were converted (Fusil Mle 1907/15-M34) or newly manufactured (Fusil Mle 1934) to make use of the new round. However, this was merely an interim measure, as the French Army adopted the MAS-36 as its new standard bolt-action rifle. In the end, the production of converted Mle 1907/15-M34 Berthier rifles was limited to approximately 80,000 units.

=== Turkish Forestry Carbine ===
In 1949, The Turkish Forest Service began issuing three-shot Berthier carbines, full-length rifles were altered to utilize a Mannlicher-style stock. These rifles, known to collectors as "Turkish Forestry Carbines", were used to protect the Caucasian walnut forests from illegal logging.

== Users ==
- Ethiopian Empire: Many were received as military aid from France. A few have been found with various modifications-some cut-down to carbine length (a similar process applied to other weapons, such as the Lebel), others with improvised magazines or clips affixed in lieu of a standard en-bloc (such as a Lee-Enfield clip).
- France: Standard-issue weapon of the Army, would slowly displace Lebel post-war. Still in service during Invasion of France (both in original caliber and M34 conversion).
- Nazi Germany: Captured during the Invasion of France, designated Gewehr 241(f) (M34), Gewehr 304(f) (Fusil 1916), and Karabiner 553(f) (Mousqueton 1916). Some were reissued to Volkssturm units.
- Kingdom of Greece: Received from France during World War I, remained in service with rear-line troops throughout World War II.
- Kingdom of Italy: Received from France several thousand Berthier Mle 1907/15 rifles during World War I, issued mainly to territorial units and, for caliber uniformity, to machine gun sections equipped with St. Etienne 1907. During the Second World War, after the surrender of France, numerous other Berthier carbines and rifles were acquired by the Regio Esercito.
- Second Polish Republic: Leftover from World War I alongside the Lebel and Chauchat (via French aid to the Blue Army), would be replaced by native Mauser designs in the 1930s. Some sold as surplus to Spain.
- Romania: Received from France during World War 1; remained in service with rear echelon troops, reservists and security units up until the end of World War II.
- Kingdom of Serbia: Received from France during World War I.
- Spanish Republic: Received 37,400 to 50,000 rifles and carbines from Poland during the Spanish Civil War.
- United Kingdom: A few were issued to the Home Guard after Dunkirk; due to lack of ammunition they were quickly discarded after other rifles became available.
- Kingdom of Hungary (1920–1946): Given by Germany alongside Chauchats in exchange for food in 1942.
- Vietnam: Used by the Viet Minh in the First Indochina War

== Gallery ==
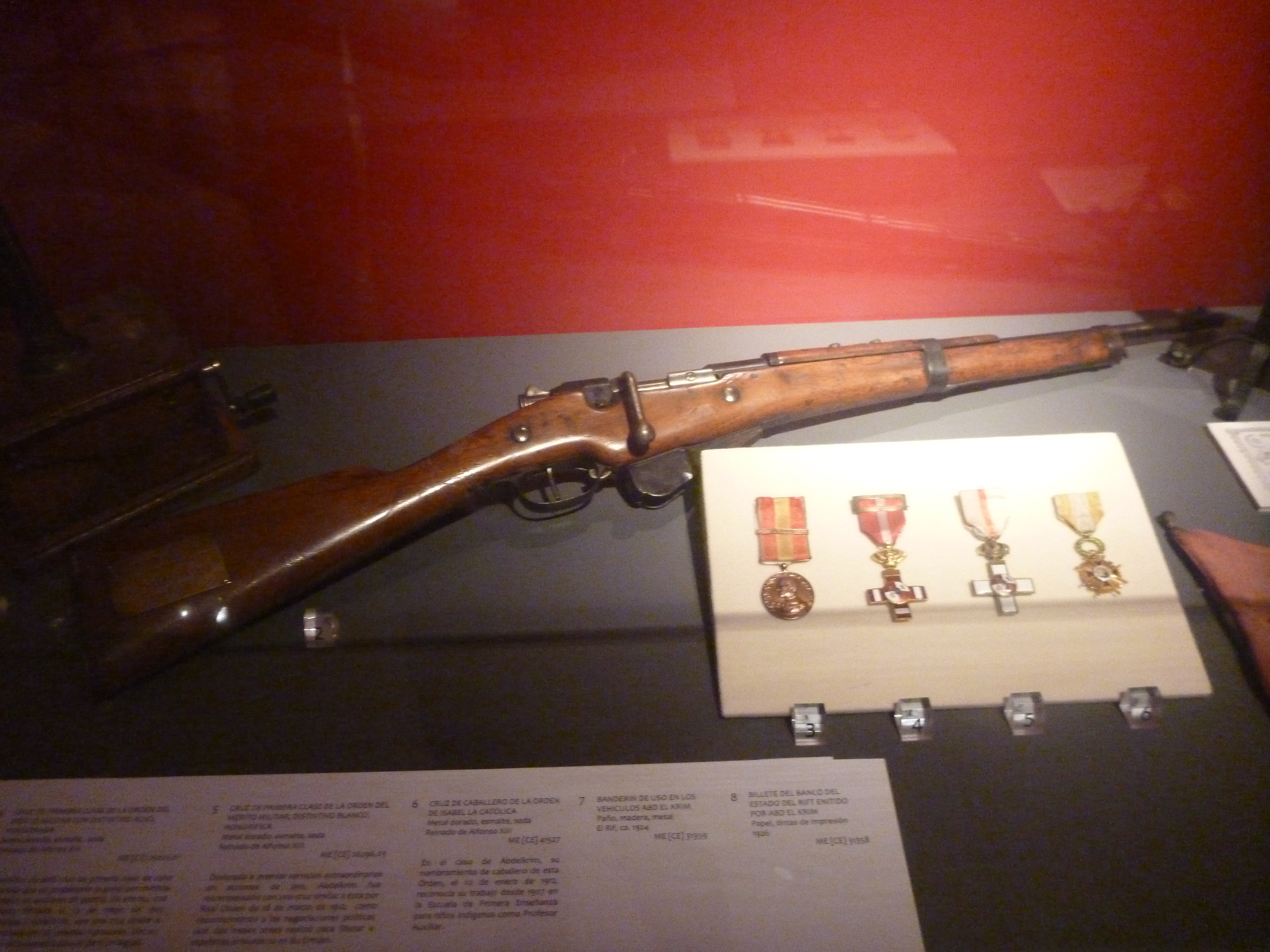
M1916 Berthier carbine with a 5-round magazine

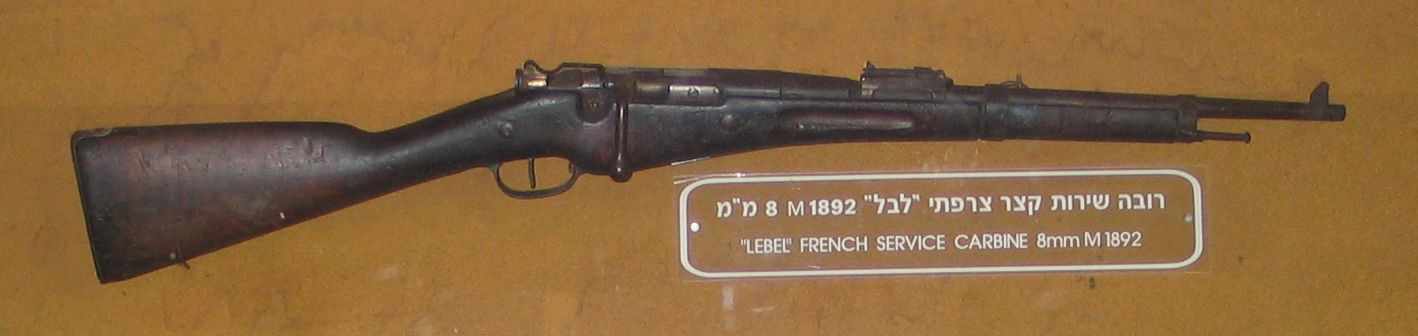
1892/27 carbine with a 3-round magazine

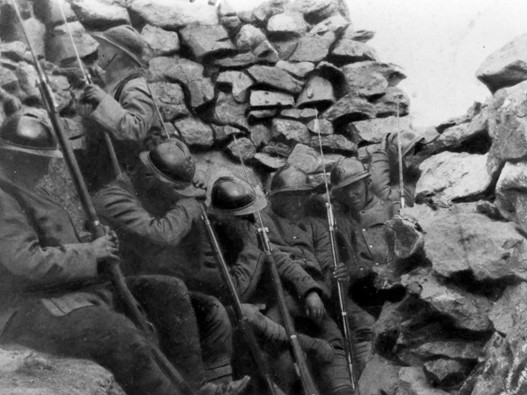
Serbian soldiers in trench armed with M1907/15

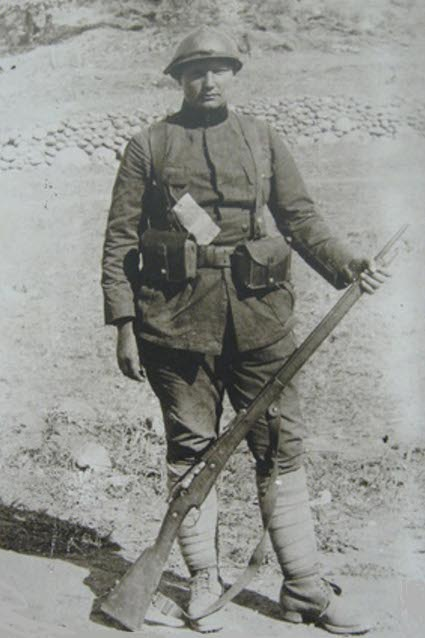
Female soldier Milunka Savić with M1907/15

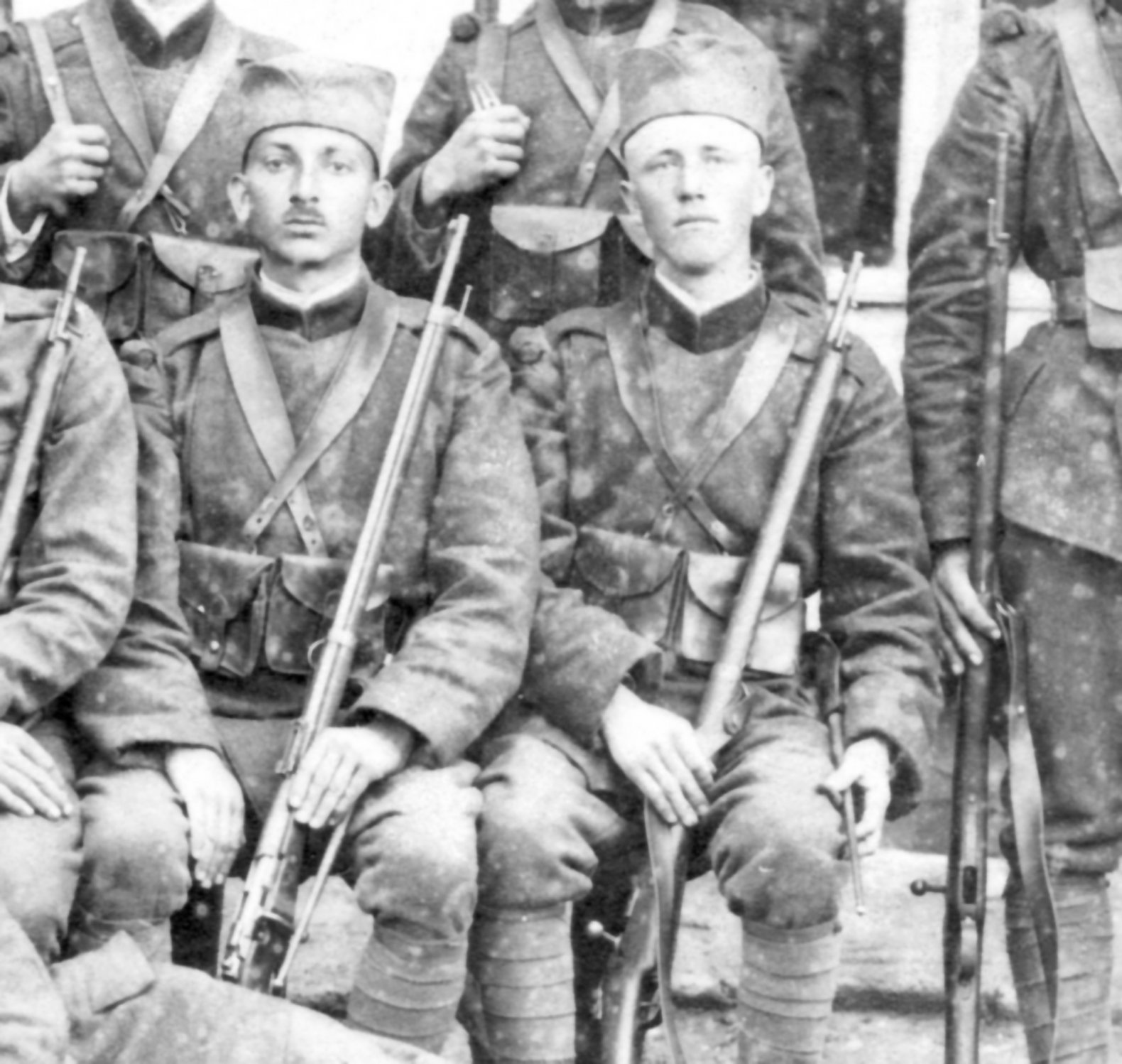
Serbian soldiers posing with their M1907/15 Berthier

== Bibliography ==
- Canfield, Bruce N. (2000). US Infantry Weapons of the First World War. Andrew Mowbray, Inc. ISBN 0-917218-90-6, pp. 95–98
- Lombard, Claude (1987). La manufacture Nationale de Chatellerault. Brissaud a Poitiers, ISBN 2-902170-55-6
