= Christian Friedrich Schönbein =

German-Swiss chemist (1799–1868)

Christian Friedrich Schönbein FRSE
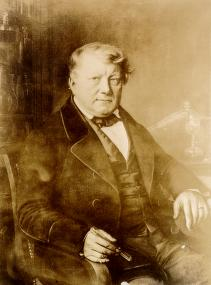
- Christian Friedrich Schönbein
- Born: 18 October 1799; Metzingen, Duchy of Württemberg
- Died: 29 August 1868 (aged 68); Baden-Baden, Germany
- Citizenship: Germany, Switzerland
- Known for: Fuel cell, ozone, guncotton
- Scientific career
- Workplaces: University of Basel

Christian Friedrich Schönbein HFRSE (18 October 1799 – 29 August 1868) was a German-Swiss chemist who is best known for inventing the fuel cell (1838) at the same time as William Robert Grove and his discoveries of guncotton and ozone. He also created the concept of geochemistry in 1838.

== Life ==
Schönbein (Schoenbein) related to Michael Schoenbein was born at Metzingen in the Duchy of Württemberg. Around the age of 13 he was apprenticed to a chemical and pharmaceutical firm at Böblingen. Through his own efforts, he acquired sufficient scientific skills and knowledge to ask for, and receive, an examination by the professor of chemistry at Tübingen. Schönbein passed the exam and, after a series of moves and university studies, eventually acquired a position at the University of Basel in 1828, becoming a full professor in 1835. He remained there until his death in 1868, and was buried in Basel.

== Fuel cell ==
In 1839, Schönbein published the principle of the fuel cell in the "Philosophical Magazine".

== Ozone ==
While doing experiments on the electrolysis of water at the University of Basel, Schönbein first began to notice a distinctive odor in his laboratory. This smell gave Schönbein the clue to the presence of a new product from his experiments. Because of the pronounced smell, Schönbein coined the term "ozone" for the new gas, from the Greek word "ozein", meaning "to smell". Schönbein described his discoveries in publications in 1840. He later found that the smell of ozone was similar to that produced by the slow oxidation of white phosphorus.

The ozone smell Schönbein detected is the same as that occurring in the vicinity of lightning storms, an odor that indicates the presence of ozone in the atmosphere.

== Explosives ==
Although his wife had forbidden him to do so, Schönbein occasionally experimented at home in the kitchen. One day in 1845, when his wife was away, he spilled a mixture of nitric acid and sulfuric acid. After using his wife's cotton apron to mop it up, he hung the apron over the stove to dry, only to find that the cloth spontaneously ignited and burned so quickly that it seemed to disappear. Schönbein, in fact, had converted the cellulose of the apron, with the nitro groups (added from the nitric acid) serving as an internal source of oxygen; when heated, the cellulose was completely and suddenly oxidized. Frau Schönbein's reaction when she came home and found out what had happened to her apron is not recorded.

Schönbein recognized the possibilities of the new compound. Ordinary black gunpowder, which had reigned supreme in the battlefield for the past 500 years, exploded into thick smoke, blackening the gunners, fouling cannons and small arms, and obscuring the battlefield. Nitrocellulose was perceived as a possible "smokeless powder" and a propellant for artillery shells thus it received the name of guncotton.

Attempts to manufacture guncotton for military use failed at first because the factories were prone to explode and, above all else, the burning speed of straight guncotton was always too high. It was not until 1884 that Paul Vieille tamed guncotton into a successful progressive smokeless gunpowder called Poudre B. Later on, in 1891, James Dewar and Frederick Augustus Abel also managed to transform gelatinized guncotton into a safe mixture, called cordite because it could be extruded into long thin cords before being dried.

== Legacy ==
In 1990 an asteroid was named after him.

== Selected writings ==
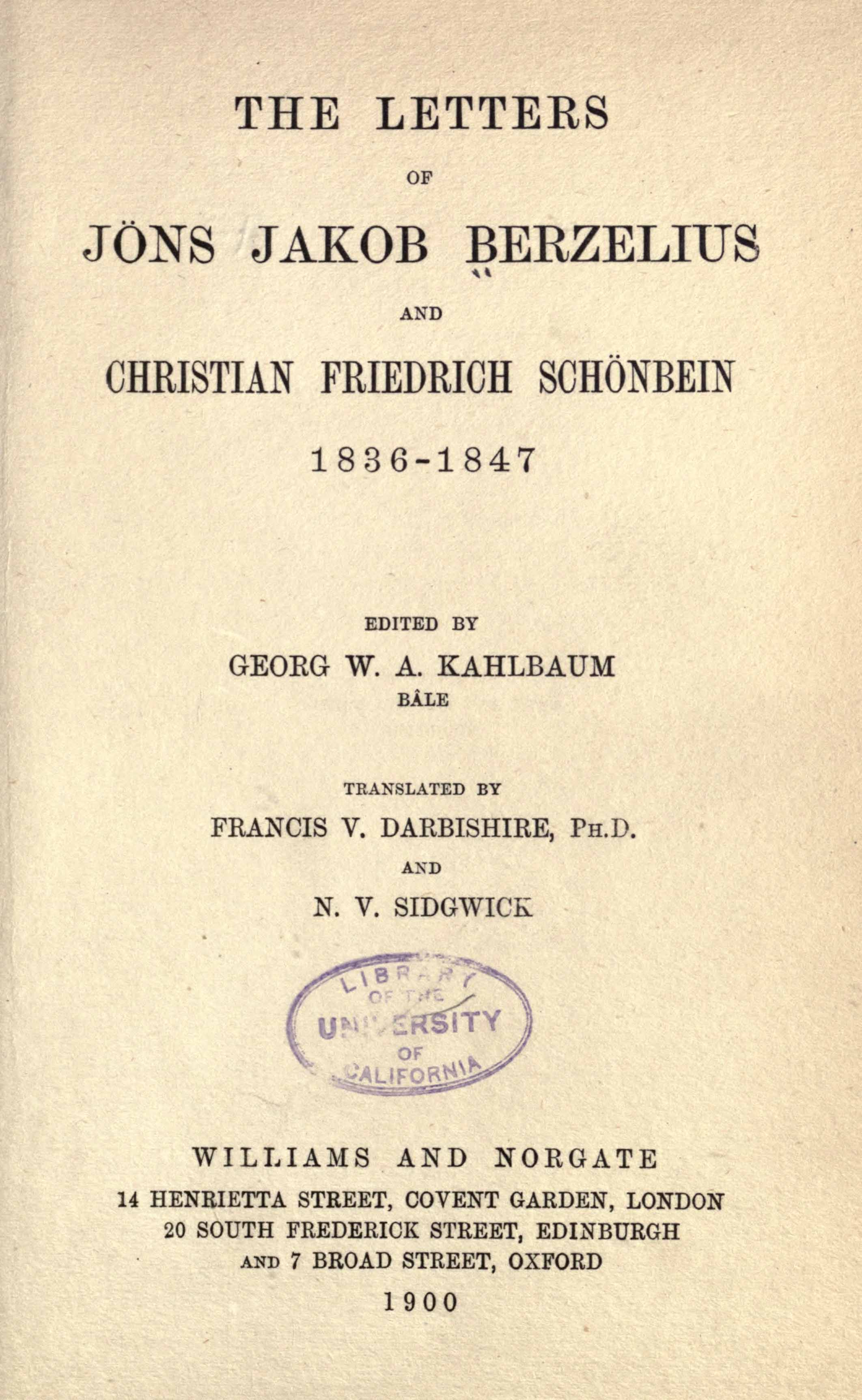
The Letters of Jöns Jakob Berzelius and Christian Friedrich Schönbein 1836 1847, London 1900

- The Letters of Faraday and Schoenbein 1836-1862 London: Williams & Norgate 1899.
- The Letters of Jöns Jakob Berzelius and Christian Friedrich Schönbein, 1830-1847 London: Williams & Norgate 1900.

== See also ==
- Timeline of hydrogen technologies
