= Gazette des armes =

French firearms periodical

- Categories: Military and civilian firearms
- Frequency: Monthly
- Founded: 1972
- Company: Régis Arm SARL
- Country: France
- Language: French
- Website: www.gazettedesarmes.com

Gazette des armes is a French monthly magazine focusing primarily on antique firearms collecting. It was founded in 1972 by Jean-Jaques Bugnes, president of the Union Francaise des amateurs d'Armes. The quality of its articles makes Gazettes des Armes the reference for all collectors. Eleven issues are published each year plus 1 or 2 special issues. It has had several editors since it was first published.
