= Ballistite =

Smokeless propellant made from two high explosives

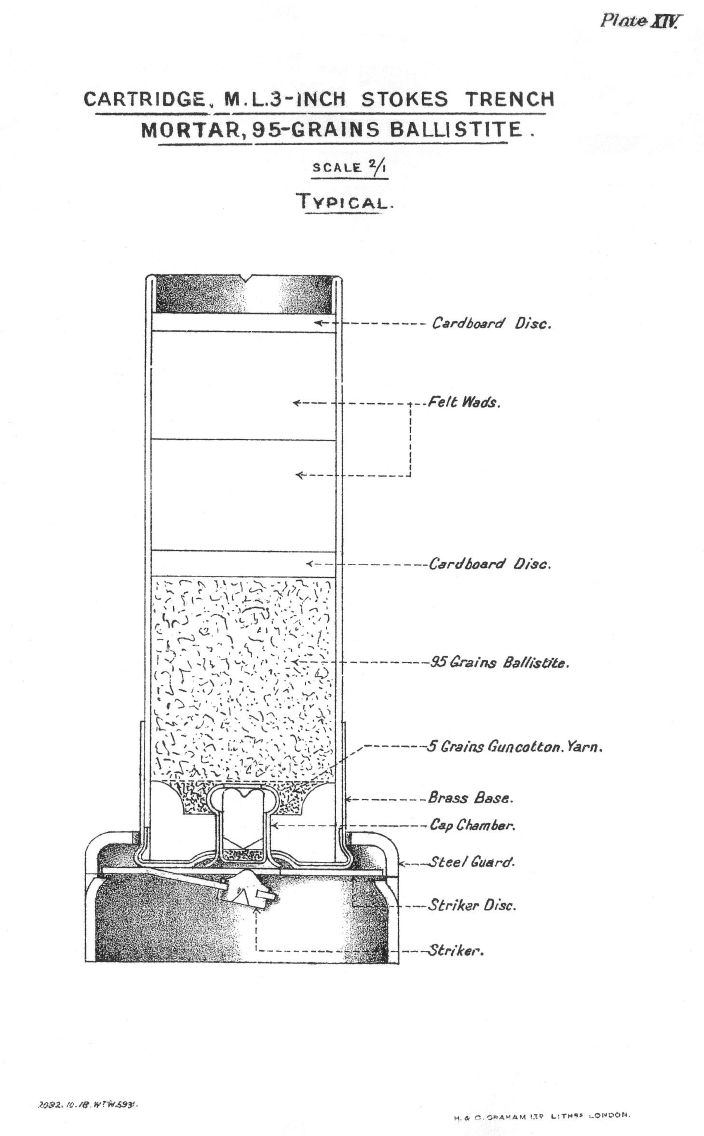
Ballistite as seen in a cross-sectional diagram of a British WW1 Stokes trench mortar cartridge

Ballistite is a smokeless propellant made from two high explosives, nitrocellulose and nitroglycerine. It was developed and patented by Alfred Nobel in the late 19th century. In its original form, it was composed of 10% camphor and equal parts of nitroglycerine and collodion.

== History ==
=== Invention ===
Alfred Nobel patented Ballistite in 1887 while living in Paris, and working with his assistant at a laboratory in Sevran. His formulation was composed of 10% camphor and equal parts nitroglycerine and collodion. The camphor reacted with any acidic products of the chemical breakdown of the two explosives. This both stabilized the explosive against further decomposition and prevented spontaneous explosions. However, camphor tends to evaporate over time, leaving a potentially unstable mixture. In an attempt to mitigate this problem, the concentration of camphor was reduced to 1/2 or 1/4 percent before it was completely replaced with either tannin or aniline, particularly on Italian-made Ballistite.

Nobel's patent specified that the nitrocellulose should be "of the well-known soluble kind". He offered to sell the rights of the new explosive to the French government, but was declined. Modern research shows that Vieille already discovered it in 1884–1885, about the same time as his Poudre B, and noted its high flame temperatures leading to bore erosion. This led the French military to conclude it was unsuitable for military use (indeed, it was a problem for all the militaries which tried to use double-base propellants later). Nobel subsequently licensed the rights to the Italian government, which entered into a contract on 1 August 1889 to obtain 300,000 kg (660,000 lb) of Ballistite; and Nobel opened a factory at Avigliana, Turin.

=== Military adoption ===
The Italian Army swiftly replaced their M1870 and M1870/87 rifles, which used black powder cartridges, by the new M1890 Vetterli, which used ballistite cartridges. As Italy was a competing great power, this was not received well by the French press and public. Newspapers accused Nobel of industrial espionage by spying on Paul Vieille (the inventor of Poudre B), and "high treason against France". Following a police investigation, he was refused permission to conduct any more research, or to manufacture explosives in France. He therefore moved to San Remo in Italy, in 1891, where he spent the last five years of his life.

=== Cordite and legal issues ===
Meanwhile, a government committee in Great Britain, called the "Explosives Committee" and chaired by Sir Frederick Abel, monitored foreign developments in explosives. Abel and Sir James Dewar, who was also on the committee, jointly patented a modified form of ballistite in 1889. This consisted of 58% nitroglycerin by weight, 37% guncotton and 5% petroleum jelly. Using acetone as a solvent, it was extruded as spaghetti-like rods initially called "cord powder" or "the committee's modification of ballistite", but this was soon abbreviated to cordite.

After unsuccessful negotiations, in 1893, Nobel sued Abel and Dewar over patent infringement and lost the case. It then went to the Court of Appeal and the House of Lords in 1895, where he also lost the two appeals and the Nobel's Explosives Company had to pay the costs. The claim was lost because the words "of the well-known soluble kind" in his patent were taken to mean soluble collodion, and to specifically exclude the ether-alcohol-insoluble guncotton.

== Uses ==
Ballistite was historically used as propellant for pistol and rifle cartridges and artillery shells. Rifle grenades such as the ENERGA and Spigot mortar rounds used in the PIAT also used Ballistite.

Ballistite is still manufactured as a solid fuel rocket propellant, although the less volatile but chemically similar diphenylamine is used instead of camphor.

== Bibliography ==
- Davis, Tenney L (1943). The Chemistry of Powder and Explosives. Vol. II. New York: John Wiley & Sons, Inc. ISBN 978-1-55918-043-6.
- Poncet, L. (July–December 1898). "Smokeless Powders". Journal of the Royal United Service Institution, Whitehall Yard. 42 (2). Translated by Haddy, T. J. London, UK: J. J. Keliher & Co.: 1424–1441. doi:10.1080/03071849809417433 – via Google Books.
- Schűck, H; Sohlman, R (1929). The Life of Alfred Nobel. London: William Heinemann Ltd. ISBN 0-444-00117-4.
