= Poudre B =

First practical smokeless gunpowder

Poudre B was the first practical smokeless gunpowder created in 1884. It was perfected between 1882 and 1884 at "Laboratoire Central des Poudres et Salpêtres" in Paris, France. Originally called "Poudre V" from the name of the inventor, Paul Vieille, it was arbitrarily renamed "Poudre B" (short for poudre blanche—white powder, as distinguished from black powder) to distract German espionage. "Poudre B" is made from 68.2% insoluble nitrocellulose, 29.8% soluble nitrocellulose gelatinized with ether and 2% paraffin. "Poudre B" is made up of very small paper-thin flakes that are not white but dark greenish grey in colour. "Poudre B" was first used to load the 8mm Lebel cartridges issued in 1886 for the Lebel rifle.

== History ==
German-Swiss chemist Christian Friedrich Schönbein created the explosive substance nitrocellulose, or "guncotton", in 1846 by treating cotton fibers with a nitric acid and sulfuric acid mixture. However, guncotton proved to be too fast burning for direct use in firearms and artillery ammunition. French chemist Paul Vieille then followed the findings of Schönbein in 1882–1884 and, after much trial and error, succeeded in transforming guncotton into a colloidal substance by gelatinizing it in an alcohol-ether mixture which he then stabilized with amyl alcohol. He then used roller presses to transform this gelatinized colloidal substance into extremely thin sheets which, after drying, were cut up into small flakes. This single-base smokeless powder was originally named "Poudre V" after the inventor's name. That denomination was later changed arbitrarily to "Poudre B" in order to distract German espionage. The original "Poudre B" of 1884 was almost immediately replaced by improved "Poudre BF(NT)" in 1887. In 1896, "Poudre BF(NT)" was replaced by "Poudre BF(AM)", which was followed by "Poudre BN3F" in 1901. The latter was stabilized with the antioxidant diphenylamine instead of amyl alcohol, and it gave safe and regular performance as the standard French gunpowder used during World War I (1914–1918). It was followed during the 1920s by "Poudre BN3F(Ae)" and later by "Poudre BPF1", which remained in service until the 1960s.

Unlike some other countries, French military had been wary of the double-base propellant from the very beginning: (modern research shows that Vielle discovered it already in 1884-1885 and noted its high flame temperatures leading to bore erosion, which led French military to conclude it was unsuitable for military use), only using it for smoothbore mortars after 1918 and in 330–380 mm naval guns in the 1930s.

== Performance ==
Three times more powerful than black powder for the same weight, and not generating large quantities of smoke, Poudre B gave the user a huge tactical advantage. It was hastily adopted by the French military in 1886, followed by all the major military powers within a few years.

Prior to its introduction, a squad of soldiers firing volleys would be unable to see their targets after a few shots, while their own location would be obvious because of the cloud of smoke hanging over them. The higher power of the new powder gave a higher muzzle velocity, which in turn produced a flatter bullet trajectory and thus a longer range. It also required lesser volumes of gunpowder and allowed a smaller caliber, thus lighter bullets, so a soldier could carry more ammunition. The French Army quickly introduced a new rifle, the Lebel Model 1886 firing a new 8 mm calibre cartridge, to exploit these benefits.

"Also black powder leaves a heavy residue in the bore. With the best conditions this residue causes a slight falling off of accuracy after from five to fifty shots have been fired from a rifle without cleaning, and when it was attempted to increase the velocity by decreasing the caliber, lengthening the bullet, and increasing the powder charge, the increase in the residue was so great as to destroy the accuracy unless the bore was cleaned after every shot."

== Stability and safety ==
The earliest "Poudre B" tended to eventually become unstable, which has been attributed to evaporation of the volatile solvents, but may also have been due to the difficulty in fully removing the acids used to make guncotton. In the early years of their use both the original Poudre B and guncotton led to accidents. For example, two French battleships, the Iéna and the Liberté, blew up in Toulon harbour, in 1907 and 1911, respectively, with heavy loss of life. By the late 1890s, safer smokeless powders had been developed, including improved and stabilized versions of "Poudre B" (e.g. Poudres BN3F and BPF1), and ballistite and cordite from the late 1880s. The guncotton problem is not completely solved even today, as an occasional batch of smokeless powder will still deteriorate, although this is extremely rare.
