= Paul Vieille =

French chemist and inventor (1854–1934)

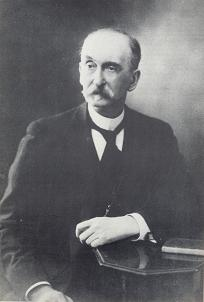
- Vieille in 1934
- Born: Paul-Marie-Eugène Vieille; 2 September 1854; Paris, France
- Died: 14 January 1934 (aged 79); Paris, France
- Education: École polytechnique
- Known for: Smokeless powder; Poudre B
- Awards: Leconte Prize (1889)
- Scientific career
- Fields: Chemistry
- Workplaces: French Academy of Sciences

Paul-Marie-Eugène Vieille (2 September 1854 – 14 January 1934) was a French chemist. He is best known for inventing smokeless powder, a nitrocellulose-based gunpowder.

== Life and career ==
Paul-Marie-Eugène Vieille was born 2 September 1854 in Paris, France. He was a graduate of École polytechnique.

Vieille conducted research with Marcellin Berthelot in the early 1880s that led to notable discoveries in the physics shock waves.

Vieille invented smokeless powder – known as Poudre B, its French army designation – in 1884. It was three times as powerful as black powder for the same weight and left virtually no residues of combustion. Vieille soon became director of the Laboratoire Central des Poudres et Salpetres in Paris, where his research had taken place. His invention was applied not only to small arms but also to the full range of artillery ammunition and was quickly adopted by all the major military powers.

Vieille died on 14 January 1934 in Paris, aged 79.

== Honours and awards ==
Vieille received the Leconte Prize in 1889 in recognition of his invention. He was a member of the French Academy of Sciences.
