= Chatellerault machine gun =

Chatellerault machine gun refers to a machine gun designed by the Manufacture d'armes de Châtellerault, such as:

- FM 24/29 light machine gun for infantry
- Reibel machine gun in tanks
- MAC 1934 aboard aircraft
