= Armed Forces of Mauritania =

- الجيش الوطني الموريتاني; Armée Nationale Mauritanienne
- Emblem of the Mauritanian Armed Forces

- Flag of the Mauritanian Armed Forces
- Service branches: Mauritanian National Army; Mauritanian National Navy; Mauritania Islamic Air Force; National Gendarmerie; National Guard
- Headquarters: Nouakchott
- Website: armee.mr

Leadership
- President: Mohamed Ould Ghazouani
- Prime Minister: Mokhtar Ould Djay
- Minister of Defense: Ba Ousmane
- Chief of National Army Staff: General Mohamed Val Ould Rayess Rayess

Personnel
- Conscription: 2 years
- Active personnel: 31,540 personnel, 5,000 para-military
- Reserve personnel: 66,000

Expenditure
- Budget: $231 million (FY2022)
- Percent of GDP: 3.9% (FY2018)

Industry
- Foreign suppliers: Belarus; Belgium; Brazil; China; Czech Republic; France; Germany; Hungary; India; Italy; Indonesia; Poland; Russia; South Africa; Spain; Switzerland; Turkey; Ukraine; United Kingdom; United States; Vietnam

Related articles
- History: Western Sahara War; Mauritania–Senegal Border War; 2003 Mauritanian coup d'état attempt 2005 Mauritanian coup d'état 2008 Mauritanian coup d'état
- Ranks: Military ranks of Mauritania

The Armed Forces of Mauritania (Arabic: الجيش الوطني الموريتاني, romanized: al-Jaysh al-Waṭanī al-Mūrītānī, French: Armée Nationale Mauritanienne) are the defense force of the Islamic Republic of Mauritania, having an army, navy, air force, gendarmerie, and presidential guard. Other services include the national guard and national police, though they both are subordinated to the Ministry of the Interior. As of 2018, the Mauritanian armed forces budget was 3.9% of the country's GDP.

The military forces of Mauritania were listed by the IISS Military Balance 2007 as comprising 15,870 personnel with an additional 5,000 paramilitaries, in the national gendarmerie. The Navy (Marine Mauritanienne) had 620 personnel and 11 patrol and coastal combatants, with bases at Nouadhibou and Nouakchott. The CIA reported that the navy included naval infantry. The small air force (Force Aérienne Islamique de Mauritanie, FAIM) had 250 personnel, 2 FTB-337 aircraft, 15 transport aircraft of various types, and 4 SF-260E trainers. The 5,000 paramilitaries were divided in the National Gendarmerie (3,000), and the National Guard (2,000) who both reported to the Ministry of the Interior. Other paramilitary services reported by the CIA in 2001 include the National Police, Presidential Guard (BASEP).

== History ==
Former flag of the Mauritanian Armed Forces (1960–2017).

Saleh Ould Hanenna, a former army major, led the 2003 Mauritanian coup d'état attempt in June 2003. It aimed to overthrow President Maaouya Ould Sid'Ahmed Taya. He commanded a rebel section of the Army during two days of heavy fighting in Nouakchott. With the failure of the coup Hanenna initially escaped capture, and formed a group called the 'Knights of Change' with Mohamed Ould Cheikhna, but they were arrested on 9 October 2004.

General Mohamed Ould Abdel Aziz, a career soldier and high-ranking officer, was a leading figure in the 2005 Mauritanian coup d'état that deposed President Maaouya Ould Sid'Ahmed Taya.

In August 2008, General Ould Abdel Aziz led the 2008 Mauritanian coup d'état that toppled President Sidi Ould Cheikh Abdallahi. Following the latter coup, Abdel Aziz became President of the High Council of State as part of what was described as a political transition leading to a new election. He resigned from that post in April 2009 to stand as a candidate in the July 2009 presidential election, which he won. He was sworn in on 5 August 2009.

== Army ==
In March 1985, the Defense Intelligence Agency reported the army was 8,300 strong with no reserves (Military Intelligence Summary – Africa South of the Sahara, DDB 2680-104-85, ICOD 15 October 1984, Mauritania pages 4, 5, declassified by letter dated 29 April 2014). Reported regions at the time were Region I – Nouadhibou, Region II – Zoueirat, Region III – Atar, Region IV – formerly at Tidjikdja, which no longer existed, Region V – Nema, Region VI – Nouakchott, and Region VII – Rosso. The army was organized into the six regions which each supervised several companies, though there was 'one small autonomous infantry battalion stationed in Nouakchott.

The Army is 15,000 strong, according to the IISS, with six military regions, two camel corps battalions, one battalion of T-55 battle tanks, one armored reconnaissance squadron, eight garrison infantry battalions, seven motorized infantry battalions, one commando/para battalion, 3 artillery battalions, 4 air defense batteries, one engineer company, and one guard battalion. The 1ère région militaire is at Nouadhibou, 2nd Military Region is at Zouerate, 3rd Military Region is at Atar, 4ème région militaire may be at Tidjikdja, 5th Military Region headquarters is at Néma, The 6th Military Region may be in the area of the capital, and the 7th Military Region may be at Aleg.

The Mauritanian military is currently involved in Operation Enduring Freedom – Trans Sahara. Previous U.S. anti-terrorist engagement included training under the Pan Sahel Initiative. Under the PSI, a 10th Special Forces Group training team carried out a one-week border monitoring training programme in January 2004.

The IISS listed equipment in 2007 as including 35 T-55 main battle tanks, 70 reconnaissance vehicles (20 Panhard AML-60, 40 Panhard AML-90, 10 Alvis Saladin), 25 wheeled APCs (estimate 20 Panhard M3 and 5 Alvis Saracen), 194 artillery pieces (80 towed: 36 HM-2/M-101, 20 D-30, 24 D-74; 114 mortars: 60 60-mm, 30 Brandt 120-mm), 24 MILAN ATGM, 114 recoilless rocket launchers (est. 90 M-40A1 106mm, est 24 M-20 75mm), est 50 RPG-7 Knout, 104 SAMs (est 100 SA-7 Grail, and a reported 4 SA-9 Gaskin), and 82 towed anti-aircraft guns (14.5mm, including 12 ZPU-4, ZU-23-2, 37 mm automatic air defense gun M1939 (61-K), 12 57 mm AZP S-60, and 12 100mm KS-19s).

=== Equipment ===
Name	Image	Caliber	Type	Origin	Notes
Pistols
MAC-50		9×19mm	Semi-automatic pistol	France	Standard issue pistol.
TT-33		7.62×25mm	Semi-automatic pistol	Soviet Union	
Submachine guns
FN P90		FN 5.7×28mm	Submachine gun Personal defense weapon	Belgium	
MAT-49		9×19mm	Submachine gun	France	
Star Model Z-45		9×23mm	Submachine gun	Spain	
Rifles
SKS		7.62×39mm	Semi-automatic rifle	Soviet Union	
AKM		7.62×39mm	Assault rifle	Soviet Union	
MAS-49/56		7.5×54mm	Semi-automatic rifle	France	
MAS-36		7.5×54mm	Bolt-action rifle	France	
Heckler & Koch G3		7.62×51mm	Battle rifle	West Germany; France	French-made G3s.
Machine guns
PKM		7.62×54mmR	General-purpose machine gun	Soviet Union	
Browning M1919		.30-06	Medium machine gun	United States	
Browning M2		.50 BMG	Heavy machine gun	United States	
AA-52		7.5×54mm	General-purpose machine gun	France	
Sniper rifles
FR F1		7.5×54mm	Sniper rifle	France	
Grenade launchers
RPG-7		40 mm	Rocket-propelled grenade	Soviet Union	50
Tanks, Armoured Vehicles, and Reconnaissance Vehicles
T-55				Soviet Union	51 in service
ERC-90				France	18 in service
Panhard AML-60				France	20 in service
Panhard AML-90				France	39 in service
Alvis Saladin				United Kingdom	40 in service
Panhard M3				France	20 in service
Alvis Saracen				United Kingdom	5 in service
Panhard EBR 75				France	15 in retired
Artillery and Mortar
D-74				Soviet Union	20 in service
D-30				Soviet Union	20 in service
M101A1				United States	35 in service
60-mm Mortar				United States	60 in service
Brandt 120-mm Mortar				France	30 in service
Anti-Tank missiles and rockets
MILAN ATGM				France	24 in service
M40 recoilless rifle				United States	90 in service
M20 recoilless rifle				United States	24 in service
SAMs and Anti-aircraft guns
SA-7 Grail				Soviet Union	100 in service
SA-9 Gaskin				Soviet Union	4 in service
Yitian-L				China	Some in service
Towed anti-aircraft guns				Soviet Union	82 in service (including 12 ZPU-4, ZU-23-2, 37 mm automatic air defense gun M1939 (61-K)).
57 mm AZP S-60				Soviet Union	12 in service
100mm KS-19				Soviet Union	12 in service.

Among reported special forces units are:

- 1er Bataillon de Commandos Parachutistes (1er BCP)
- 2eme Bataillon de Commandos Parachutistes (2eme BCP)
- Bataillon de la Securite Presidentielle (BASEP)
- Bataillon Special d'Intervention (BSI)
- Group Special d'Intervention (GSI)

== Air Force ==
After achieving independence in 1960 the Faidem (Force Aerienne Islamique de Mauritanie) was supplied equipment by France, such as C-47s and MH.1521 Broussards, which was later replaced by the Britten-Norman BN-2A Defender between 1976 and 1978 and had operated as a transport and observation squadron in the Western Sahara War. During the same time two Cessna 337s and two DHC-5 Buffalo STOL transports were supplied in 1977 and 1978 with one DHC-5 crashing almost immediately and the other being returned to De Havilland Canada in 1979. After the Polisario Front shot down one Defender and damaged two in 1978 the Mauritanian government ordered six IA-58 Pucarás for ground attack duties from Argentina; this order was later cancelled after a Mauritanian military coup.

The Air Force School was created in Atar. It was founded to train pilots, mechanics, other crewmen for the Air Force.

More recent procurements have been from China in the form of the Harbin Y-12 II turboprop transports were delivered in September 1995, one crashed in April 1996. A second one crashed on 12 July 2012. The Xian Y7-100C (a copy of the AN-24 transport) was delivered from October 1997, which crashed in May 1998. The Air Force had also recently received their order of several Embraer EMB 314 Super Tucano aircraft.

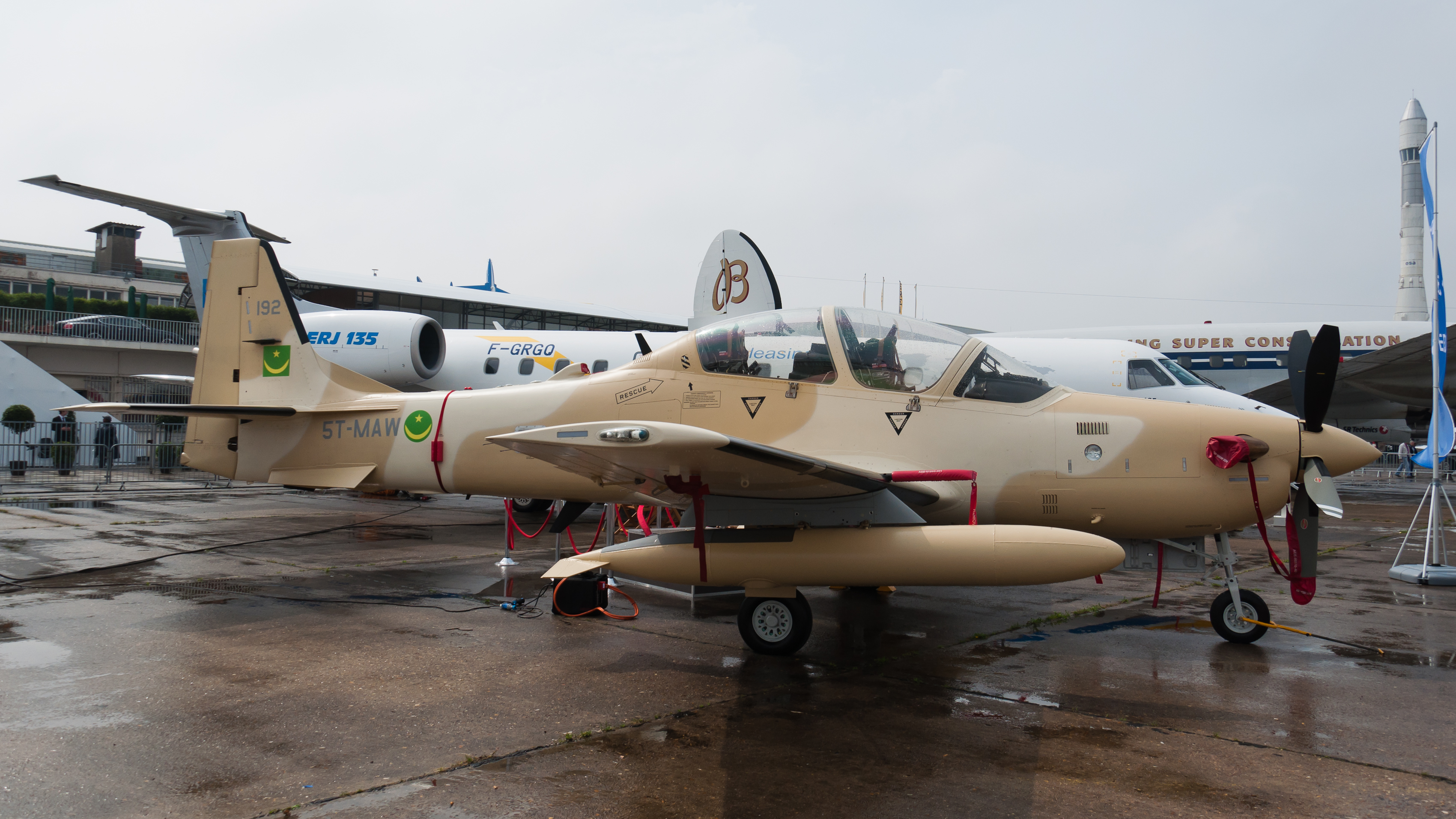
Mauritania Air Force A-29B Super Tucano at Paris Air Show 2013.

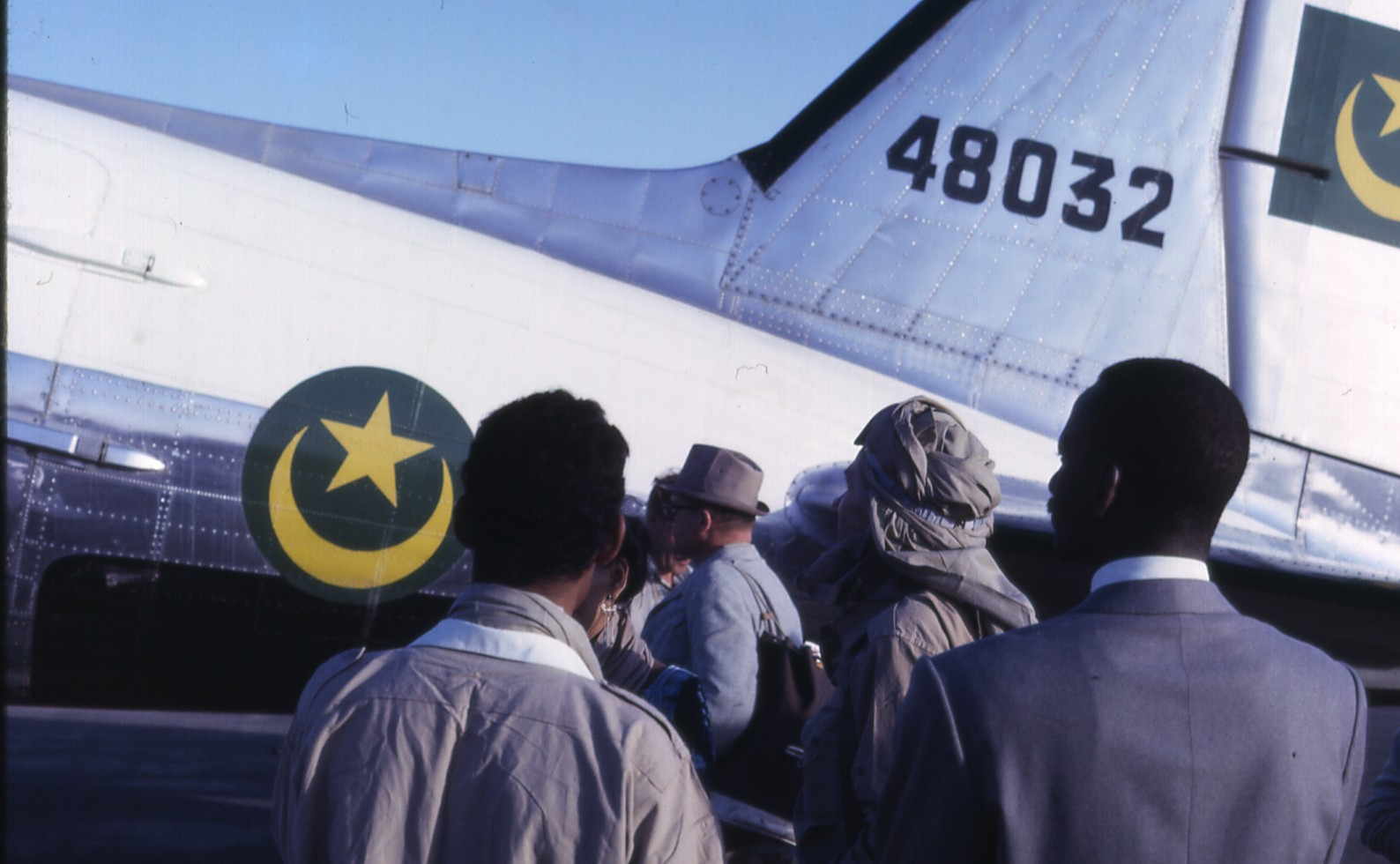
Mauritanian Douglas C-47A Dakota in the Sahara.

== Navy ==
Mauritania has developed a five-year plan to develop its navy into a force that is capable of defending the country's 235,000 km squared exclusive economic zone, Admiral Isselkou Ould Cheik El-Weli said during a promotion ceremony held at the Nouadhibou naval base in late May 2017. The Saharamedias.net website reported that the plan includes the acquisition of two 60-meter vessels, which are currently under construction, and "mid-sized ships", as well as the formation of three companies of marines. No further details were provided.

The Mauritanian Navy was created on 25 January 1966, after the extension of Mauritania's territorial waters from 12 to 30 nautical miles (22 to 56 kilometres). By 1972 the navy had one small patrol gunboat and two small patrol craft that performed port control and customs duties. In 1987 the navy had thirteen boats. Of these boats, only eight were seaworthy, and the navy could send only two vessels out to open water at a time. Mauritania's exclusive economic zone (EEZ) extended 200 nmi (370 km) out from the coast, but even if effective coastal surveillance were possible, the navy's vessels would not be able to control Mauritania's waters. Nouadhibou housed the major naval base; Nouakchott housed a secondary base.

=== Ship inventory ===
A patrol boat similar to this one is used by the Navy.

Vessel	Origin	Type	In service	Notes
LIMAM EL HADRAMI	China	Patrol boat		Obtained in 2001
TIMBEDRA	China	Patrol boat		Obtained in 2016 . CMS from France (LYNCEA CMS)
GORGOL	China	Patrol boat		Obtained in 2016 . CMS from France (LYNCEA CMS)
Aboubekr Ben Amer	France	Patrol boat		Obtained in 1992
El Nasr	France	Patrol boat	1	Patra-class
Z'bar	Germany	Patrol boat	1	Neustadt-class

== See also ==
- Chief of National Army Staff (Mauritania)
