= Chief of National Army Staff (Mauritania) =

Chief of the National Army Staff
- Incumbent; Lieutenant General Mohamed Vall El Rayess since 22 December 2024
- Armed Forces of Mauritania
- Formation: 1964
- First holder: Mbarek Bouna Moukhtar

The chief of national army staff is the highest-ranking military officer in the Armed Forces of Mauritania and is responsible for maintaining control over the service branches.

== List of officeholders ==
No.	Portrait	Name (born–died)	Term of office			Ref.
No.	Portrait	Name (born–died)	Took office	Left office	Time in office	Ref.
1		Captain; Mbarek Bouna Moukhtar (Birth: 1935)	24 December 1964	24 December 1965	1 year	
2		Captain; Mustapha Ould Mohamed Saleck (Birth: 1936)	25 December 1965	9 February 1967	1 year, 1 month	
3		Captain; Mbarek Bouna Moukhtar (Birth: 1935)	10 February 1967	24 July 1968	1 year, 5 months	
4		Captain; Mustafa Ould Salek (Birth: 1936)	24 July 1968	15 October 1970	2 years, 2 months	
5		Major; Ahmed Mahmoud Ould El Houssein (Birth: 1938)	15 October 1970	24 June 1976	5 years, 8 months	
6		Lieutenant Colonel; Ahmed Ould Bouceif (Birth: 1934)	24 June 1976	11 July 1977	1 year	
7		Colonel; Mbarek Boune Moukhtar (Birth: 1935)	12 July 1977	13 February 1978	7 months	
8		Lieutenant Colonel; Mustafa Ould Salek (Birth: 1936)	14 February 1978	10 July 1978	4 months	
9		Lieutenant Colonel; Mohamed Khouna Ould Haidalla (Birth: 1940)	10 July 1978	19 April 1979	9 months	
10		Lieutenant Colonel; Ahmedou Ould Abdallah (Birth: 1940)	20 April 1979	26 March 1980	11 months	
11		Lieutenant Colonel; Maaouya Ould Sid'Ahmed Taya (Birth: 1941)	26 March 1980	15 July 1980	3 months	
12		Lieutenant Colonel; Yall Abdallah El Hassan (Birth: 1940)	15 July 1980	7 March 1984	3 years, 7 months	
13		Colonel; Maaouya Ould Sid'Ahmed Taya (Birth: 1941)	8 March 1984	12 December 1984	9 months	
14		Colonel; Ahmedou Ould Abdallah (Birth: 1940)	15 December 1984	8 May 1985	4 months	
15		Colonel; Yall Abdallah El Hassan (Birth: 1940)	12 May 1985	28 October 1985	5 months	
16		Lieutenant Colonel; Jibril Ould Abdallah (Birth: 1943)	29 October 1985	30 September 1986	11 months	
17		Lieutenant Colonel; Diallo Mohamed (Birth: 1937)	1 October 1986	23 December 1986	2 months	
18		Colonel; Ahmed Ould Menih (Birth: 1944)	24 December 1986	26 August 1991	4 years, 8 months	
19		Colonel; Moulay Ould Boukhreiss (Birth: unknown)	27 August 1991	31 December 2001	10 years, 4 months	
20		Colonel; Mohamed Lemine Ould N'Diayane (Birth: unknown)	31 December 2001	8 June 2003	1 year, 5 months	
21		Colonel; El Hadi Ould Sidiq (Birth: unknown)	10 June 2003	14 March 2004	9 months	
22		Colonel; El Arbi Sidi Aly (Birth: unknown)	14 March 2004	2 August 2005	1 year, 4 months	
23		Colonel; Abdul Rahman Ould Boubacar (Birth: unknown)	3 August 2005	30 July 2007	1 year, 11 months	
24		Colonel; Mohamed Mohamed Saleh (Birth: unknown)	31 July 2007	24 December 2007	4 months	
25		Colonel; Felix Negri (Birth: unknown)	24 December 2007	13 May 2008	4 months	
26		Major General; Mohamed Ould Ghazouani (Birth: 1956)	13 May 2008	6 November 2018	10 years, 5 months	
27		Lieutenant General; Mohamed Cheikh Mohamed El Amine (Birth: unknown)	6 November 2018	7 June 2020	1 year, 7 months	
28		Lieutenant General; Mohamed Bamba Ould Meguett (Birth: 1957)	8 June 2020	22 December 2021	1 year, 6 months	
29		Lieutenant General; Mokhtar Bellah Chaabane (Birth: unknown)	22 December 2021	22 December 2024	3 years	
