= Firearms regulation in France =

Regulations regarding the purchase, possession and use of firearms in France

To buy a firearm in France, in line with the European Firearms Directive, a hunting license or a shooting sport license is necessary depending on the type, function and magazine capacity of the weapon.

== History ==
In 1563, King Charles IX of France made an address to the Rouen parliament about forbidding firearms in which he made the following statement:

Middle French

D'auantage cõsiderant que les meurtres, volleries, assassinats, & autres entreprinses, qui troublent le commun repos de nosdicts subects, s'exercent plus par les armes à feu, que nuls aultres : Défendons tresestroictement sur mesmes peines à toutes personnes, de quelque estat, dignité & qualité qu'ils soyent, porter ne faire porter par leurs gens & seruiteurs dedans les villes, ne par les champs, aucune hacquebute, pistolle ne pistolet, ne d'icelles tirer: sinon (...).

English

Considering that murders, robberies, killings & other enterprises, which disturb regularly the rest of our subjects, are more caused by firearms than any others: we forbid very strictly with the same punishment for everyone, of any state, dignity & quality they may be, to carry or have carried by their people & servitors neither within any town, nor in the countryside, any hacquebute, pistol nor pistolet, nor to use them: except (...)

Gun ownership was restricted until the Farcy law (Loi Farcy) of 1885, which liberalized gun ownership and production. This regime continued until 1939, when weapons were divided into categories and ownership of military calibre weapons was strictly regulated, almost prohibited. Political instability after WWII led to further regulation.

== Firearms classification ==
As of September 2015, classification has been simplified to 4 categories:

- Category A:
  - Category A1: Firearms disguised as another object, firearms with fully automatic fire capacities, firearms of a calibre greater than 20 mm, handgun magazines with a capacity greater than 20 rounds, and rifle or shotgun magazines with a capacity greater than 31 rounds. There is an exception for magazines owned by IPSC (TSV in French) shooters with a certificate from the shooting range where they are registered.
  - Category A2: Military materiel, materiel for transportation, or weapons used for combat.
  - Category A11: Semi-automatic rifles shorter than 60 cm with the stock detached or folded.
  - Category A12: Rifles converted from automatic to semi-automatic.
- Category B:
  - Category B1: Handguns with a capacity of 20 rounds or fewer.
  - Category B2: Manually operated long guns with a capacity between 11 and 31 rounds, semi-automatic long guns with a capacity between 3 and 31 rounds and smooth bore pump-action shotguns.
  - Category B4: Any firearm chambered in the following calibers: 7.62×39mm; 5.56×45mm NATO; 5.45×39mm; .50 BMG; 14.5×114mm.
  - Category B5: Any registered parts of a Category B firearm.
  - Category B6, B7, B8: Specific weapons for riots and crowd control.
- Category C: Generally-accepted hunting weapons in France: manual operation long guns with a capacity of 11 rounds or fewer, and semi-automatic long guns with a capacity of 3 rounds or fewer. Pump-action rifled shotguns with a capacity of 5 rounds or fewer are within Category C, as long as they have fixed stocks, a fixed capacity of 4+1 or less, a barrel length 60 cm or greater and an overall length over 80 cm. Manually-operated rifles in any caliber must have a barrel length of 45 cm or greater to be a Category C weapon. All shotguns must have a barrel length of 60 cm or greater, have fixed stocks, fixed magazines of 2+1 and an overall length greater than 80 cm to be allowed for hunting.
- Category D: Pepper spray, air guns, non-convertible guns designed to fire blanks, gas, or signal ammunition, stun batons, black powder guns (non-metallic cartridge), deactivated guns, guns with a patent older than 1 January 1900, and weapons that fire projectiles in a non-pyrotechnic manner with a muzzle energy between 2 and 20 joules (e.g. airsoft guns, paintball guns, etc.). Exceptions include all metallic, smokeless-powder firearms made before 1900.

== Ammunition classification ==
Any handgun ammunition is classified as Category B, for example, someone who owns a lever-action carbine in Category C chambered for .357 magnum needs to have a B-categorized weapon in order to buy .357 magnum ammunition.

Some exceptions exist for calibers like in Category C-6°.

- Category B: Quota of 2000 rounds per year and a maximum of 1000 in stock; an ID card or resident card and a gun ownership authorization are required.
  - 7.62 Soviet (7.62×39mm)
  - .223 Remington (5.56×45mm NATO)
  - 5.45×39mm Russian
  - .50 BMG (12.7×99mm NATO)
  - .57 calibre (14.5×114mm)
- Category C-6°: A maximum of 1000 in stock; an ID card or resident card and a gun ownership authorization are required.
  - .25-20 Winchester (6.35×34mmR)
  - .32-20 Winchester (8×33mm Winchester)
  - .38-40 Winchester (10.1×33mm Winchester)
  - .44-40 Winchester
  - .44 Magnum
  - .45 Colt
- Category C-7°: A maximum of 1000 in stock; an ID card or resident card and a hunting license or shooting sport license and a gun ownership authorization are required.
  - 7.5×54mm MAS
  - 7.5×55mm Swiss
  - .30 M1 (7.62×33mm)
  - 7.62×51mm NATO
  - .308 Winchester
  - 8mm Mauser (7.92×57mm)
  - 7.62×54mmR or 7.62×54mm Mosin Nagant
  - .30-06 Springfield (7.62×63mm)
  - .303 British (7.7×56mmR)
- Category C-8°: An ID card or resident card plus a hunting license or a shooting sport license are required.
  - Other rifle ammunition (e.g. 7×64mm, 9.3×62mm, etc.)
- Category D: An ID card or resident card is required for purchase and the buyer must be at least 18 years old, with the exception of sportive shooters over the age of 12, for whom a written parental authorization must be written.

== Storage ==
- Category A and B: Firearms, ammunition, and registered firearms parts have to be stored in a gun safe or a safe room.
- Category C: Firearms can be stored (unloaded) in a safe or in another location that is not easy to access (e.g. by using a barrel lock or having them attached to a wall). Ammunition must be stored separately from the weapon, even in a safe.
- Category D: No storage restriction.

== Ownership and purchase conditions ==
- Category A11 and A12 firearms are unavailable for purchase since 1 August 2018, whereas beforehand they held the same requirements as Category B. As of 1 November 2022, all weapons classed as Category A11 and A12 are being seized or destroyed by the French government without compensation to the owners.
- Category B first requires the owner to be older than 18, and to be affiliated with a shooting range for at least 6 months. They must then attend at least 3 shooting sessions with an instructor, with each session spaced at least 2 months apart, which means a minimum of 12 months of range time. After these sessions, the head of the shooting club must give a formal endorsement of the shooter. To apply for a license, the prospective owner must have a certificate of medical health and proof of purchase of a safe. The shooter must open an account with the S.I.A., a French government database of firearms and their owners. The shooter can then apply to the French government for an authorization to possess category B firearms. If accepted, the shooter has 6 months to purchase Category B (and also C) firearms. A category B licence is valid for 5 years and must be renewed at least 3 months prior to the date of its expiration.
- Category C requires the owner to be older than 18 and have a valid hunting, sports shooting, or clay pigeon licence.
- Category D requires the owner to be older than 18.

Exceptions exist for children and teenagers with a shooting or clay pigeon licence and parental approval. A child aged between 9 and 12 can own D categorized weapon that shoot projectiles in a non-pyrotechnic way between 2 and 20 joules. Individuals between the ages of 12 and 16 can own C and D-categorized weapons. They can also own one-shot, rimfire Category B firearms if they participate in international shooting competitions (only with a shooting sport licence).

Individuals between the ages of 16 and 18 who have a shooting, hunting, or clay pigeon license can own C and D-categorized weapons. They can also own Category B firearms if they participate in international shooting competitions (only with a shooting sport licence).

Carrying a gun is defined as having a gun by one's side in a public place ready to use. Transporting a gun is defined as having an unloaded, locked or disassembled gun and having a legitimate reason for doing so in a public place. Some legitimate reasons to transport a firearm are activities such as hunting, sports shooting, collecting, or clay pigeon shooting. Personal defense, however, does not qualify as a legitimate reason. A special form allows a civilian to apply for a 1-year carry licence, which allows them to carry a handgun and a maximum of 50 rounds if they are "exposed to exceptional risks to their life". In practice, these licences are only issued to politicians. Hunting, collector, and clay pigeon licences only allow the transportation of D- and C-categorized weapons. A shooting sport licence allows transportation of all categories of weapons. Since the November 2015 Paris attacks, police officers are allowed to carry their service firearms while off duty.

Brandishing a firearm in public can result in charges for public disorder.
