= 7.5×57mm MAS =

French military rifle cartridge

7.5 mm MAS
- Type: Rifle
- Place of origin: France

Service history
- Used by: France

Production history
- Produced: 1924 to 1929

Specifications
- Parent case: 6.5×55mm
- Case type: Rimless, bottleneck
- Bullet diameter: 7.8 mm (0.31 in)
- Neck diameter: 8.6 mm (0.34 in)
- Shoulder diameter: 11.2 mm (0.44 in)
- Base diameter: 12.2 mm (0.48 in)
- Rim diameter: 12.2 mm (0.48 in)
- Rim thickness: 1.4 mm (0.055 in)
- Case length: 57.6 mm (2.27 in)

The 7.5×57mm MAS or 7.5×58mm mle 1924c was a short-lived French rifle cartridge that was introduced in the mid-1920s to replace the 8×50mmR Lebel, although it itself was soon replaced with the 7.5×54mm French round, that served the French for decades to come until France, along with the rest of NATO, adopted the standard NATO calibers, 5.56×45mm NATO and 7.62×51mm NATO.

== Description ==
The obsolete 8mm Lebel round was powerful and accurate but due to its shape it was particularly poorly suited to automatic weapons with large-capacity magazines. The only weapon ever fielded in 7.5 mm MAS mod. 1924 was the fusil-mitrailleur mle 1924, a light machinegun based on the B.A.R action. Early examples of the FM 24 proved prone to various failures; additionally, it was possible to mistake the new 7.5×57mm for a German 7.92×57mm Mauser round. The Mauser round would chamber and fire, but the larger bullet would not fit in the barrel and could cause a catastrophic malfunction. The new 7.5 mm round was abandoned and replaced by the 7.5×54mm MAS mod. 1929.

== See also ==
- Table of handgun and rifle cartridges
