= Pistolet automatique modèle 1935S =

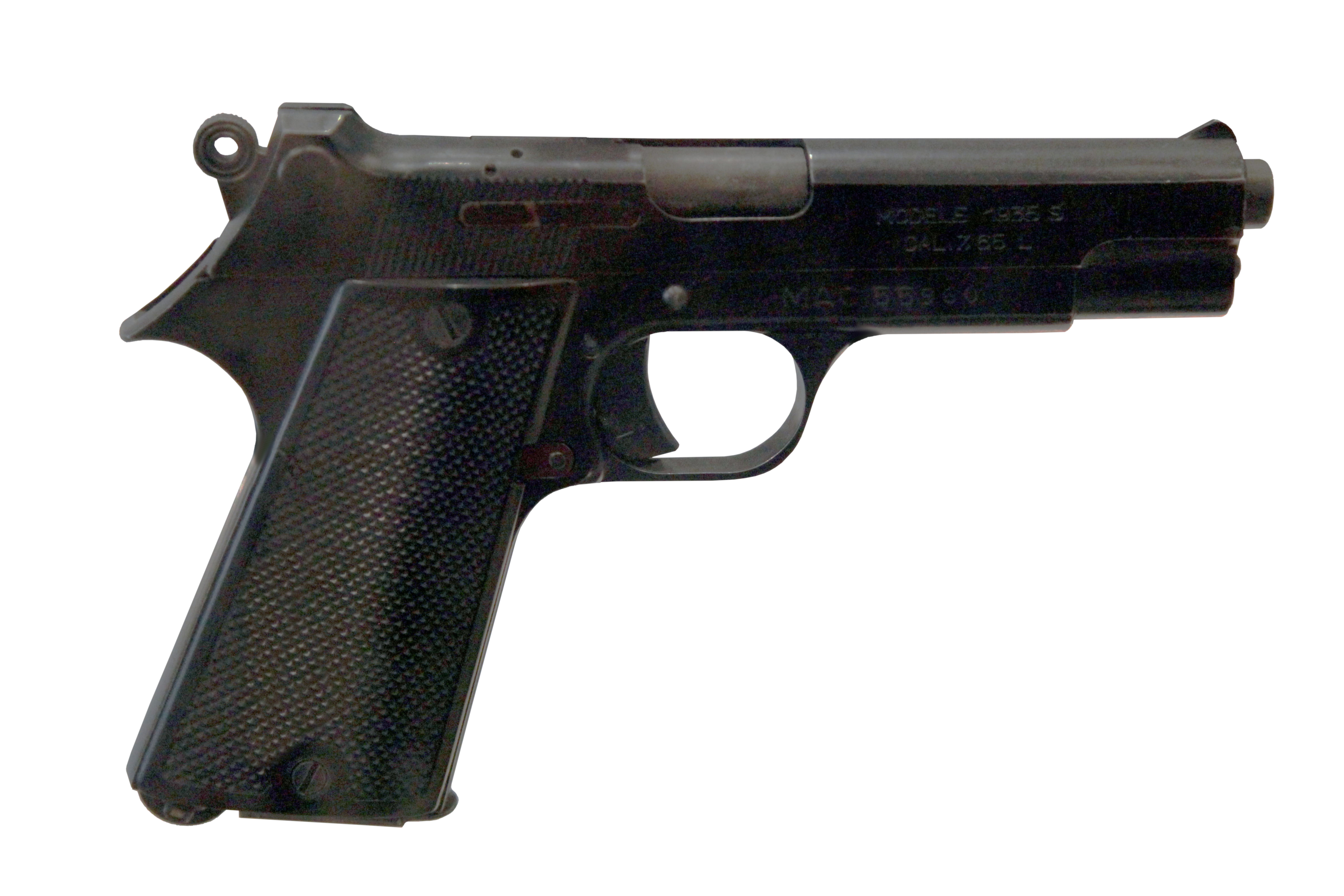
- Pistol model 1935 S on display at the Musée de l'Armée.
- Type: Semi-automatic pistol
- Place of origin: France

Service history
- In service: 1937–1960s
- Used by: France; Nazi Germany
- Wars: World War II; First Indochina War; Algerian War; Vietnam War; Laotian Civil War; Cambodian Civil War

Production history
- Designed: 1935
- Manufacturer: Manufacture d'armes de Saint-Étienne (MAS)
- Produced: 1937–1956
- No. built: 82,773

Specifications
- Mass: 720 g (1.59 lb)
- Length: 7.75 in (197 mm)
- Barrel length: 4.29 in (109 mm)
- Diameter: 7.65 mm
- Cartridge: 7.65×20mm Longue
- Action: Short recoil
- Muzzle velocity: 345 metres per second (1,130 ft/s)
- Feed system: 8-round magazine

The Pistolet automatique modèle 1935S (Automatic Pistol Model 1935S) or Modèle (Mle.) 1935 S is a semi-automatic pistol chambered for the 7.65mm Longue cartridge. A competitor in the 1935–1937 French military trials to select a new sidearm, it initially lost to the SACM 1935A, but production was ordered nonetheless to alleviate shortages in pistols in the runup to the Second World War.

== Description ==
It was designed by Manufacture d'armes de Saint-Étienne (MAS), a French government arsenal. It was a competitor in the 1935-37 French military trials to select a new sidearm, losing to the SACM 1935A. However, as France prepared for the looming war in Europe it became apparent that SACM production was inadequate to meet the military's needs.

In 1938 additional contracts were given to MAS to produce the 1935S, and all production of the commercial MAB model D and MAPF "Unique" model 17 pistols was diverted to the military. MAS began initial delivery of the 1935S to the French military in early 1939, but production ceased after only about 1,404 pistols were built when German forces occupied Saint-Étienne in the summer of 1940. MAS factory workers were able to hide key 1935S tooling and machinery before the Germans occupied the factory; as a result, unlike the 1935A, MAB D and Unique 17, the 1935S was not produced during the German occupation of France.

Production resumed in 1944 after the end of the occupation. Since MAS was also a primary producer of French military rifles and light machine guns needed for the French colonial war in Indochina, production of the 1935S was shifted to other French arms producers in late 1944, after MAS had built of total of about 6,686 pistols.

The other makers of the 1935S were M-F (Manufacture Française d’Armes et Cycles de Saint Étienne, aka ManuFrance) which built about 10,000 pistols in 1944–45; SAGEM (Société d'Applications Générales d'Électricité et de Mécanique), which built about 10,000 pistols in 1945–1953, and MAC (Manufacture Nationale d’Armes de Chatellerault), which built about 56,087 pistols in 1946–1956.

MAC revised the 1935S safety to function as did the 1935A safety; this change was included in all MAC and SAGEM 1935S production starting in 1946, with the pistols marked 1935 S M1 starting in March 1947. In total, about 82,773 1935S pistols were produced between 1937 and 1956.

The 1935S directly inspired the design of the French service pistol that replaced the 1935A and 1935S, the MAC Mle 1950 in 9mm Parabellum.

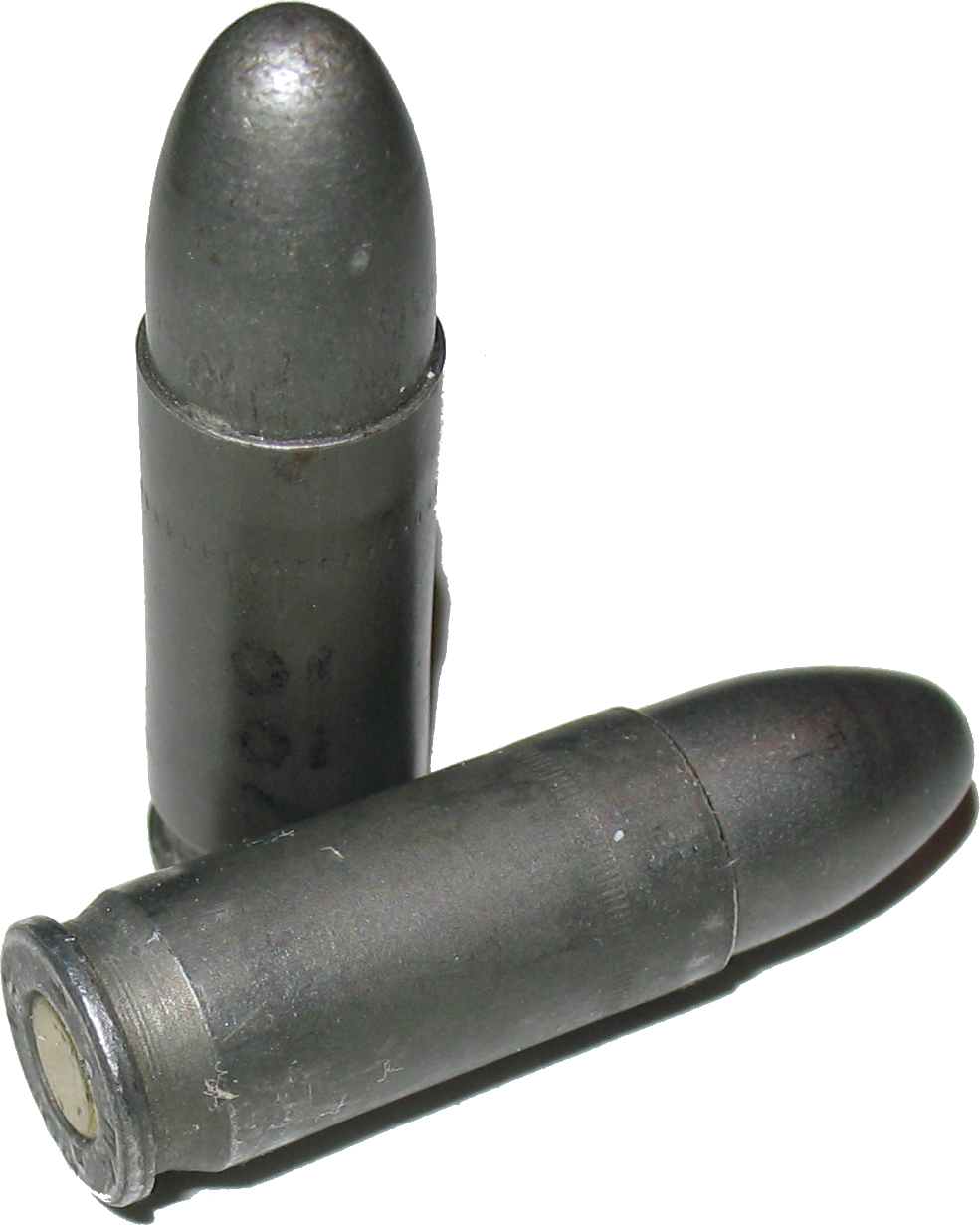
7.65 mm Longue cartridges
