= Military ranks of Mauritania =

The Military ranks of Mauritania are the military insignia used by the Armed Forces of Mauritania. Being a former colony of France, Mauritania shares a rank structure similar to that of France.

== Commissioned officer ranks ==
The rank insignia of commissioned officers.

Rank group	General / flag officers		Senior officers			Junior officers
Mauritanian National Army
Mauritanian National Army	فريق; Fariq	لواء; Liwa	عميد; Amid	مقدم; Muqaddam	رائد; Ra'id	نقيب; Naqib	ملازم أول; Mulazim awwal	ملازم; Mulazim
Mauritanian Navy
Mauritanian Navy	فريق; Fariq	لواء; Liwa	عميد بحري; Amid bahriun	مقدم بحري; Muqaddam bahriun	رائد بحري; Ra'id bahriun	نقيب بحري; Naqib bahriun	ملازم أول بحري; Mulazim awwal bahriun	ملازم بحري; Mulazim bahriun
Mauritania Islamic Air Force
Mauritania Islamic Air Force	فريق; Fariq	لواء; Liwa	عميد; Amid	مقدم; Muqaddam	رائد; Ra'id	نقيب; Naqib	ملازم أول; Mulazim awwal	ملازم; Mulazim
Rank group	General / flag officers		Senior officers			Junior officers

== Other ranks ==
The rank insignia of non-commissioned officers and enlisted personnel.

Rank group	Senior NCOs				Junior NCOs	Enlisted
Mauritanian National Army
Mauritanian National Army	مساعد أول; Mosa'id awwal	مساعد; Mosa'id	رقيب أول; Raqib awwal	رقيب; Raqib	عريف 'arif	جندي; Jundiun
Mauritanian Navy
Mauritanian Navy	مساعد أول بحري; Mosa'id awwal bahriun	مساعد بحري; Mosa'id bahriun	رقيب أول بحري; Raqib awwal bahriun	رقيب بحري; Raqib bahriun	عريف بحري 'arif bahriun	بحار; Bihaar
Mauritania Islamic Air Force
Mauritania Islamic Air Force	مساعد أول; Mosa'id awwal	مساعد; Mosa'id	رقيب أول; Raqib awwal	رقيب; Raqib	عريف 'arif	جندي; Jundiun
Rank group	Senior NCOs				Junior NCOs	Enlisted
