= FM 24/29 light machine gun =

FM 24/29
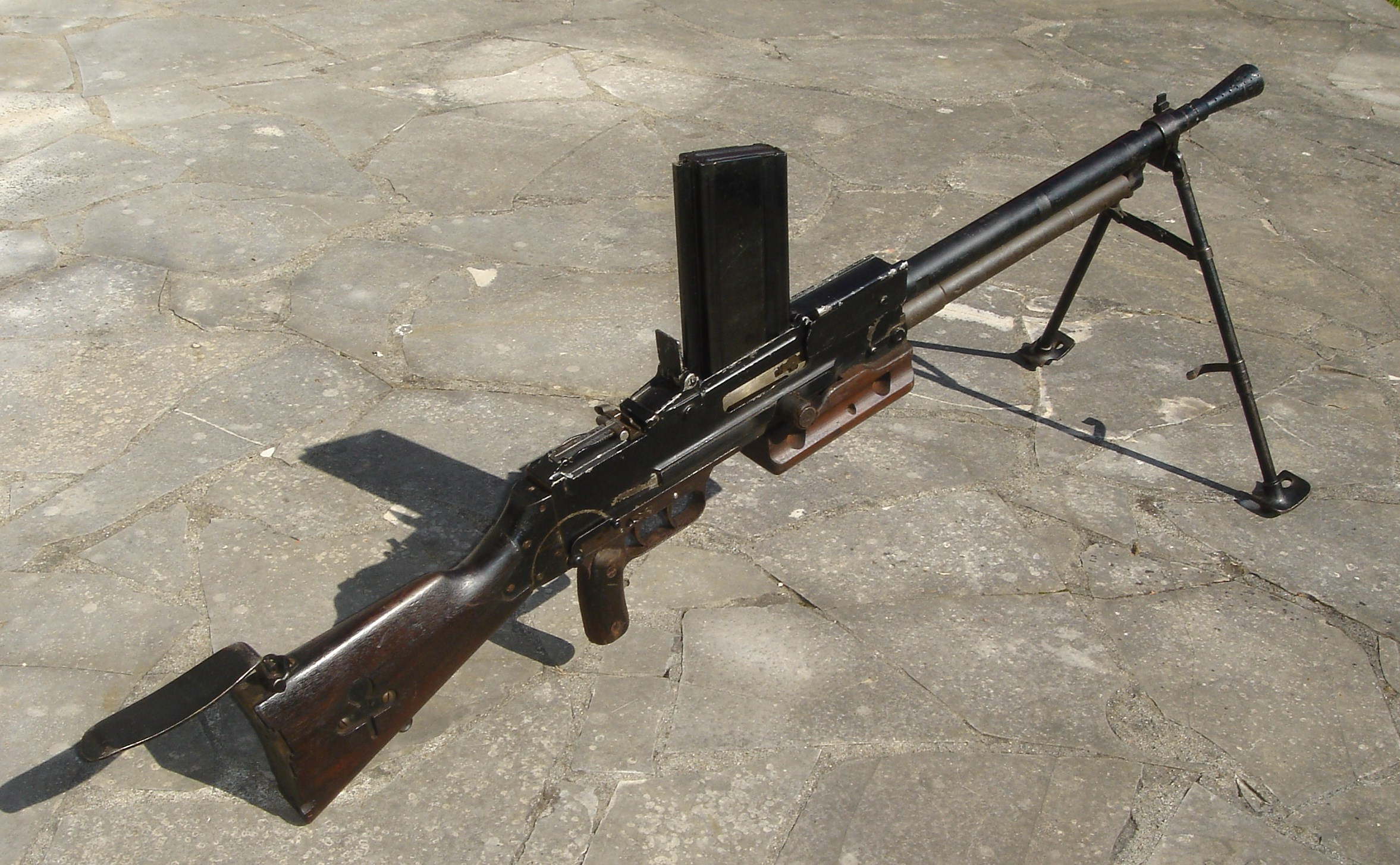
- French FM 24/29
- Type: Light machine gun
- Place of origin: France

Service history
- In service: French Army: 1925–1960s; Gendarmerie nationale: 1956–2006
- Used by: See § Users
- Wars: List of conflicts: Rif War; Spanish Civil War; World War II; First Indochina War; 1948 Arab–Israeli War; Ifni War; Algerian War; Suez Crisis; 1958 Rif riots; Tunisian War of independence; Bizerte crisis; 1958 Lebanon crisis; Sand War; Western Sahara conflict; Tuareg rebellion; Chadian Civil War; Vietnam War; Cambodian Civil War; Laotian Civil War; Cameroon War; Portuguese Colonial War; Lebanese Civil War

Production history
- Designer: Lt col. Reibel assisted by Chief Armorer Chosse
- Designed: 1920–1924
- Manufacturer: Manufacture d'Armes de Châtellerault
- Produced: 1925–1960s
- No. built: 190,400 to 232,942
- Variants: See § Variants

Specifications
- Mass: 8.9 kg (19.62 lb)
- Length: 1,080 mm (42.52 in)
- Barrel length: 500 mm (19.69 in)
- Cartridge: 7.5×54mm French
- Caliber: 7.5mm
- Barrels: 1
- Action: Gas-operated; Bolt-link
- Rate of fire: 450 Rounds/min
- Muzzle velocity: 830 m/s (2,723 ft/s)
- Effective firing range: 1,250 m (1,370 yd)
- Maximum firing range: 3,950 m (4,320 yd)
- Feed system: 25-round detachable box magazine
- Sights: Iron sights

The Fusil-mitrailleur Modèle 1924 Modifié 29 (or MAC 24/29), designed in 1924 by the Manufacture d'armes de Châtellerault, is a 7.5×54mm French light machine gun, which was the standard-issue machine gun of the French Army from 1925 until the 1960s and was in use until 2000–2006 with the National Gendarmerie.

== History ==
The Chauchat machine gun, hastily developed under the pressure of the events of the First World War, gave way around 1925 to the new FM MAC 1924 which fired the brand new 7.5×57mm MAS (7.5×57mm) cartridge. After a series of accidents with reused captured German weapons during training, chambering the 7.92×57mm Mauser, too close to the new ammunition, the FM MAC 1924 was adapted in 1929 to fire a new 7.5×54mm MAS M29 ammunition after some modifications (a change of magazine and barrel) to become the FM MAC 1924/29. This model would be called FM 24/29 in service by the French infantry. The FM24/29 was gradually replaced in the early 1960s by the AA-52.

== Development ==
After the end of World War I, the French Army sought to replace the problematic Fusil-mitrailleur mle 1915 CSRG light machine rifle (better known as the Chauchat). French commanders considered standardising on the American Browning Automatic Rifle (BAR), but eventually required the development of a locally built weapon. MAS (Manufacture d'Armes de St. Etienne - one of several government-owned arms factories in France) proposed a direct derivative of the BAR known as FM MAS 1922, the Army also trialled the Hotchkiss Model 1922, Lewis Mark I and Browning BAR M1918 but the Manufacture d'Armes de Châtellerault (MAC) won the bid with its weapon, which was partly derived from the BAR action. It had been formulated and designed by a Lieutenant Colonel Reibel assisted by Chief Armorer Chosse.

The FM Mle 1924 entered production in late July 1925 and saw first operational use in Morocco in May 1926. It was immediately well-received and even favorably compared in performance with the much heavier Hotchkiss machine gun. However, problems created by the new 7.5mm ammunition did appear. In particular, 8×57mm Mauser ammunition which was used in captured Mauser rifles carried by auxiliaries in Morocco during the Rif War from 1920 to 1926, could be chambered and fired with disastrous results. This situation led to the development of a slightly shorter 7.5×54mm round, which was retained in 1929 as the standard ammunition for all future rifles and light machine guns in French service. The modified fusil-mitrailleur modèle 1924 modifié 1929 (FM Mle 1924 M29) was mass-manufactured (187,412), beginning in 1930. In addition to these newly manufactured guns some 45,530 older FM Mle 1924s, already in service after phasing out the Chauchat, were rebarreled in order to accept the newer 7.5×54mm ammunition.

Both the original fusil-mitrailleur Mle 1924 (rifle machine gun, model of 1924) as well as the modified Mle 1924 M29 have the same overall features: a folding bipod and can accommodate a small levelling stand under the buttstock, an in-line wooden stock, a pistol grip and a top-mounted 25-round detachable magazine. The top mounted magazine necessitates shifting the rear and front sights to the left, which forces the weapon to be fired right handed. The bolt is held open after the magazine's last round had been fired. There are two separate triggers: the trigger in front for using semi-automatic fire only and the rear trigger for firing on full automatic. Protection of all the openings against mud and dust proved excellent. It could be mounted on a motorcycle sidecar or in vehicle weapon ports using a mounting set in the handguard. The leather carrying strap, robust and efficient, has a metal hook allowing the user to switch from the carrying position to a hip firing position. The cyclic rate was controlled at 450 rounds per minute, thus allowing more continuous firing without overheating. In general, this new weapon was accurate and reliable but the barrel was screwed well into the receiver, as in the Browning Automatic Rifle (BAR), and thus it could not be separated quickly and easily in the field as for the Czech ZB vz. 26 and its British variant, the Bren gun. The French Army instruction manual (July 1925) recommends not to go beyond 400 rounds of uninterrupted firing since at that point the gun needs to be given a pause of ten to fifteen minutes in order to cool off. But instead, the French instruction manual recommends the following routine for the FM 1924: fire 4 to 5 detachable magazines (100 to 125 rounds), take a short pause, then keep repeating that same restrained fire plus short pause routine which permits steady performance and very extensive firing periods.

The book La Manufacture Nationale d'Armes de Châtellerault, a technical history of all the military firearms developed and manufactured at Châtellerault, includes a highly detailed technical chapter dealing with the FM Mle 1924 and Mle 1924-M29.

== Operational use ==
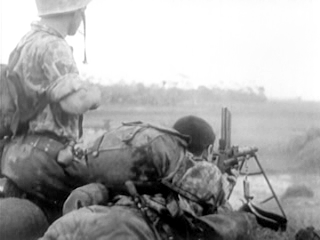
French Foreign Legion paratroopers of the 1e BEP firing an FM 24/29 during a Viet Minh ambush (1952).

This weapon was well liked by the soldiers of the French army who would use it for the first time in combat on May 11, 1926, during the Rif War. The FM 24/29 was the standard squad-level automatic weapon of the French infantry and cavalry at the start of World War II. After the French surrender in 1940, the Germans captured large quantities of this weapon, which they used operationally until the end of the war, under the designations of MG 115(f) and MG 116(f).

Those weapons were used on the Russian front by supplementary units of the German army which were partially equipped with them. Some examples of the FM 24/29 are displayed in the ex-Soviet museums devoted to the Great Patriotic War. The MAC 24/29 was also used in limited numbers by the Finnish Defence Forces during the Winter War and the "Continuation War".

From 1943 on, as the French army was re-equipped and reorganized in North Africa with Allied support, the FM 24/29 was kept in service, as French troops considered it superior to the Browning Automatic Rifle (BAR).

The FM 24/29 was the workhorse in the First Indochina War, as the infantry squad weapon and mounted in jeeps in the SAS style. The FM 24/29 served in the armed forces until after the end of the war in Algeria. The FM 24/29 was replaced by the AA-52 general-purpose machine gun in the 1960s in frontline service, but would remain for a long time as the squad weapon for the regiments of the General Reserve of the French Army, stored in the Mobilizing Centres across the country until the mid-1980s. The FM 24/29 was still in use with the National Gendarmerie regional brigades until 2000–2006.

Withdrawn from active military service around 1965, the FM 24/29 became the squad support weapon in the general reserve, as it did in the National Police (mainly CRS) and the National Gendarmerie. Thus all the departmental gendarmerie brigades were to be equipped with the FM 24/29 at the rate of one weapon per 10 to 15 non-commissioned officers, and its withdrawal from service with them would only take place in 2006 (the 7.5 MAS ammunition no longer being supplied), including in the reserves of the Mobile Gendarmerie squadrons.

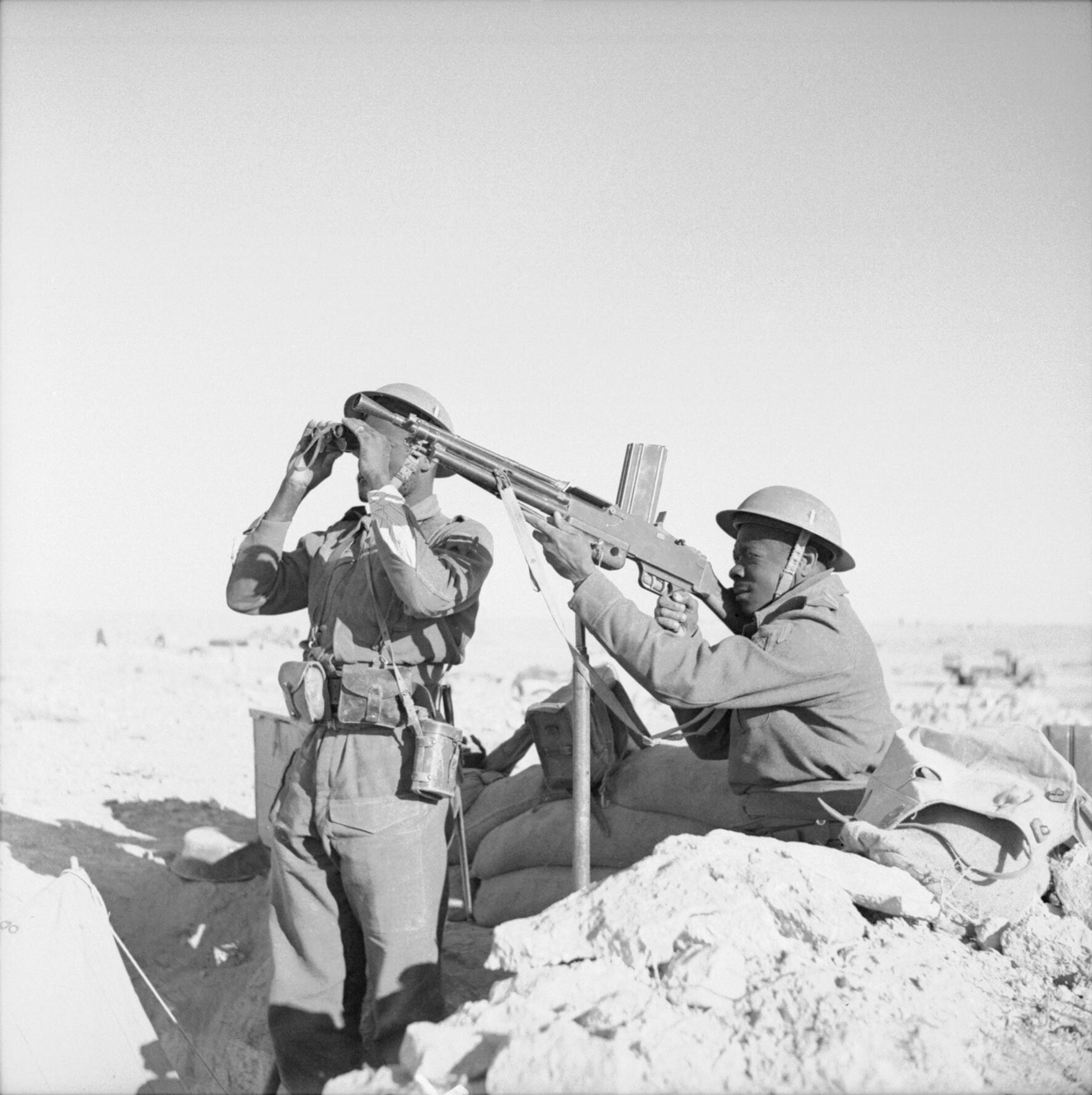
Soldiers of the colonial troops of the Free French Forces in February 1942 with a MAC 24/29.

Large numbers of MAC 24/29 would be ceded to former French colonies in Africa during the decolonization process (Algeria, Benin, Cameroon, Central African Republic, Comoros, Congo, Ivory Coast, Djibouti, Gabon, Guinea, Guinea-Bissau, Madagascar, Morocco, Mauritania, Niger, Senegal, Seychelles and Chad). At least 200 examples were used by the Israeli Defense Forces in the 1947–1949 Palestine war.

Likewise, it was supplied to the auxiliaries raised in Cambodia, Laos and in the State of Vietnam during the Indochina War. It thus found itself in the hands of the Viet Minh. During the Vietnam War, the MAC 24/29 continued its Indochinese military career in the ranks of its former enemies of the Viet Cong and the People's Army of Vietnam, as well as with the Army of the Republic of Vietnam (ARVN) and its paramilitary units. The FM 24/29 kept soldiering on during the Vietnamese occupation of Cambodia up to 1989.

== Variants ==
=== Model 1924/1929D machine gun ===
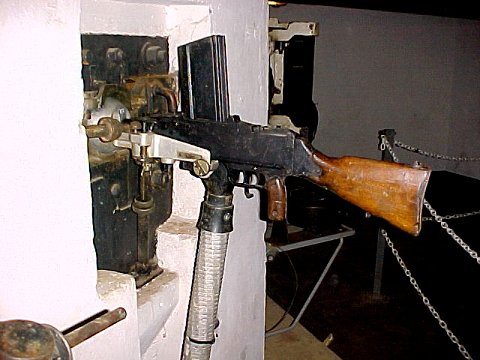
Model 1924/1929D mounted in a firing port of the Maginot Line.

The FM 24/29D, with a longer, thicker barrel, fired a heavy bullet variant (7.5mm 1933D cartridge) of its original ammunition. It was intended for the casemates of the Maginot Line where it was quickly replaced in this role by the Reibel machine gun. After the armistice of June 1940, the German occupiers recycled a good number of examples on the Atlantic Wall.

=== M1931 ===
A derivative of the gun, the MAC Modèle 1931, with a heavier barrel and 150-round side-mounted pan magazine, was produced as a heavy machine gun for installation in tanks and fortified emplacements, particularly the Maginot Line. It is also sometimes known as the JM Reibel, which actually stands for Jumelage de mitrailleuses Reibel (Reibel twin-mounted machine guns). The Reibel was mounted in jeeps in the SAS style during the Indochina War.

== Users ==
- Algeria: Captured weapons
- Benin
- Central African Republic
- Republic of the Congo
- Djibouti
- Finland: 100 received from France and used during the Winter War and the Continuation War.
- France
  - French Third Republic: First adopted by French Army in 1924.
  - Free France
  - Vichy France
  - French Fourth Republic: Also saw service with the National Gendarmerie.

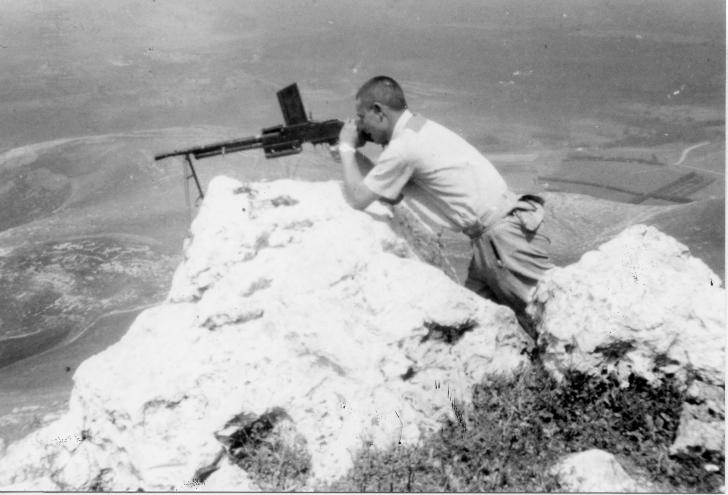
Yiftach Brigade outpost at Kibbutz Misgav Am on the Lebanese border. 1948

- Italian Partisans: Examples captured by Fascist Italy following the fall of France were later captured and used by partisans.
- Ivory Coast
- Kingdom of Laos: Received by French Government during First Indochina War.
- Lebanon
- Nazi Germany: Captured weapons. The mle 1924/29 served as Leichtes MG 116(f). The few surviving Mle 1924 models were given the designation Leichtes MG 115(f).
- Niger
- Poland
- Spanish Republic
- North Vietnam (Viet Minh and Viet Cong) Captured weapons, known as Trung liên Vĩnh Cát, from the French vingt quatre (24).
- South Vietnam (Vietnamese National Army and Army of the Republic of Vietnam) Captured weapons.

== See also ==
- Breda 30
- Charlton automatic rifle
- Mendoza C-1934
- Madsen machine gun
- Type 96 light machine gun
- Type 99 light machine gun
- Degtyaryov machine gun
- Lahti-Saloranta M/26
- ZB-26
