= Model 1924/1929D machine gun =

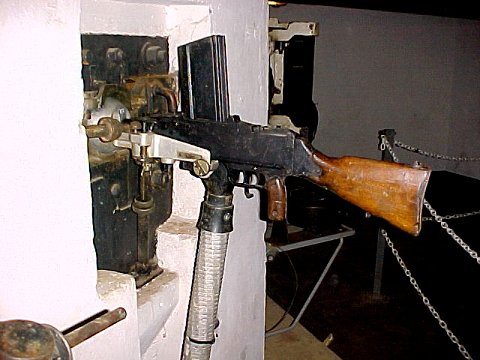
Un FM sous casemate avec trémie RB.

The Model 1924/1929D machine gun was a French infantry weapon used on the Maginot Line.

It was a variant of the MAC 24/29, adapted to firing from interior firing ports in the bunkers of the Maginot Line.

== Sources ==
- Philippe Truttman, La Muraille de France ou la Ligne Maginot, Gérard Klopp éditeur, 1985.
- Site sur les armes françaises.
