= Reibel machine gun =

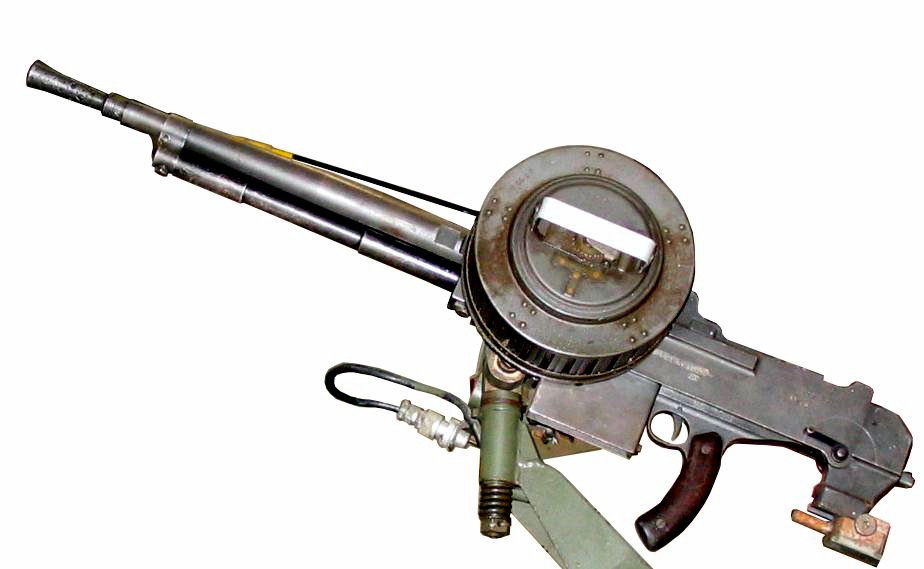
- Preserved mitrailleuse mle 31 in the Saumur armour museum (single-mount, tank-style model)
- Type: Machine gun
- Place of origin: France

Service history
- Used by: See Users
- Wars: World War II; 1948 Arab–Israeli War; First Indochina War; Vietnam War; Algerian War; Chadian Civil War (1965–79)

Production history
- Designed: 1931
- Manufacturer: Manufacture d'armes de Châtellerault

Specifications
- Mass: 11.8 kg
- Length: 1030 mm
- Barrel length: 600 mm
- Cartridge: 7.5×54mm French 7.5x55mm Swiss
- Caliber: 7.5 mm
- Action: Gas
- Rate of fire: 750 rounds per minute (theoretical); 450rpm for one minute or 150rpm sustained (practical)
- Muzzle velocity: 830 m/s (with balle C)
- Feed system: 150-round pan magazine
- Sights: Iron (single guns); Telescopic (fortification mounts)

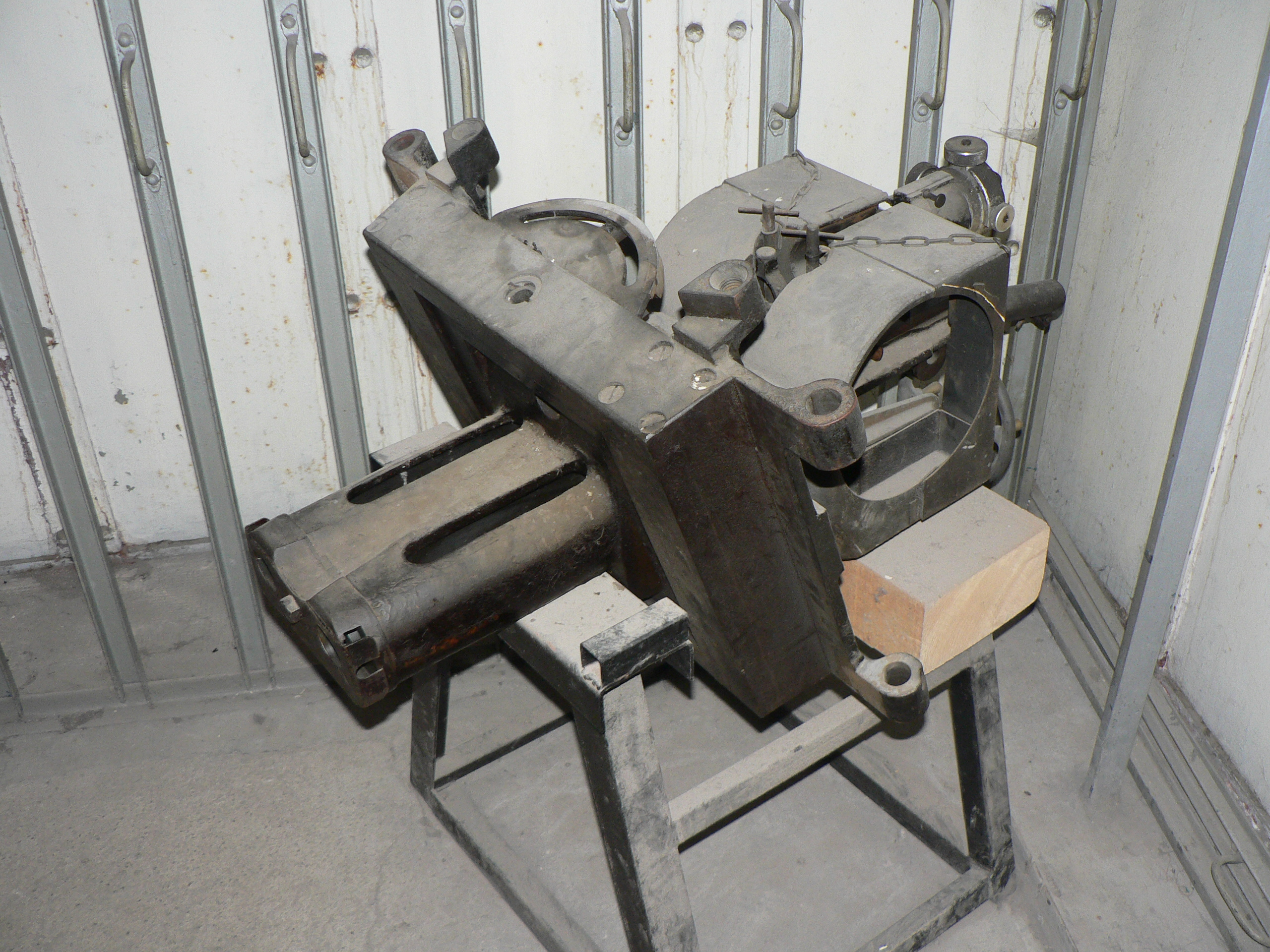
A Jumelage de mitrailleuses Reibel twin-mounting for use in fortifications. Shown without guns mounted, front oblique angle. Note heavy metal protective shrouding for the barrels, and circular openings for pan magazines. Square frame is intended to bolt into standard embrasures.

The MAC mle 1931 machine gun (official French designation Mitrailleuse modèle 1931 - machine gun, model of 1931), was a machine gun used in French tanks of the World War II era, as well as in fortifications such as the Maginot Line. It is also sometimes known as the JM Reibel, from Jumelage de mitrailleuses, or Reibel twin-mounted guns and really refers to the specialized twin-mounting frame used in JM cloche cupolas on the Maginot Line fortifications, while MAC mle 1931 refers specifically to the gun. The JM twin-mounts were the standard emplacement for the mle 1931 in fixed fortifications, while tanks and other AFVs received single guns.

== Overview ==
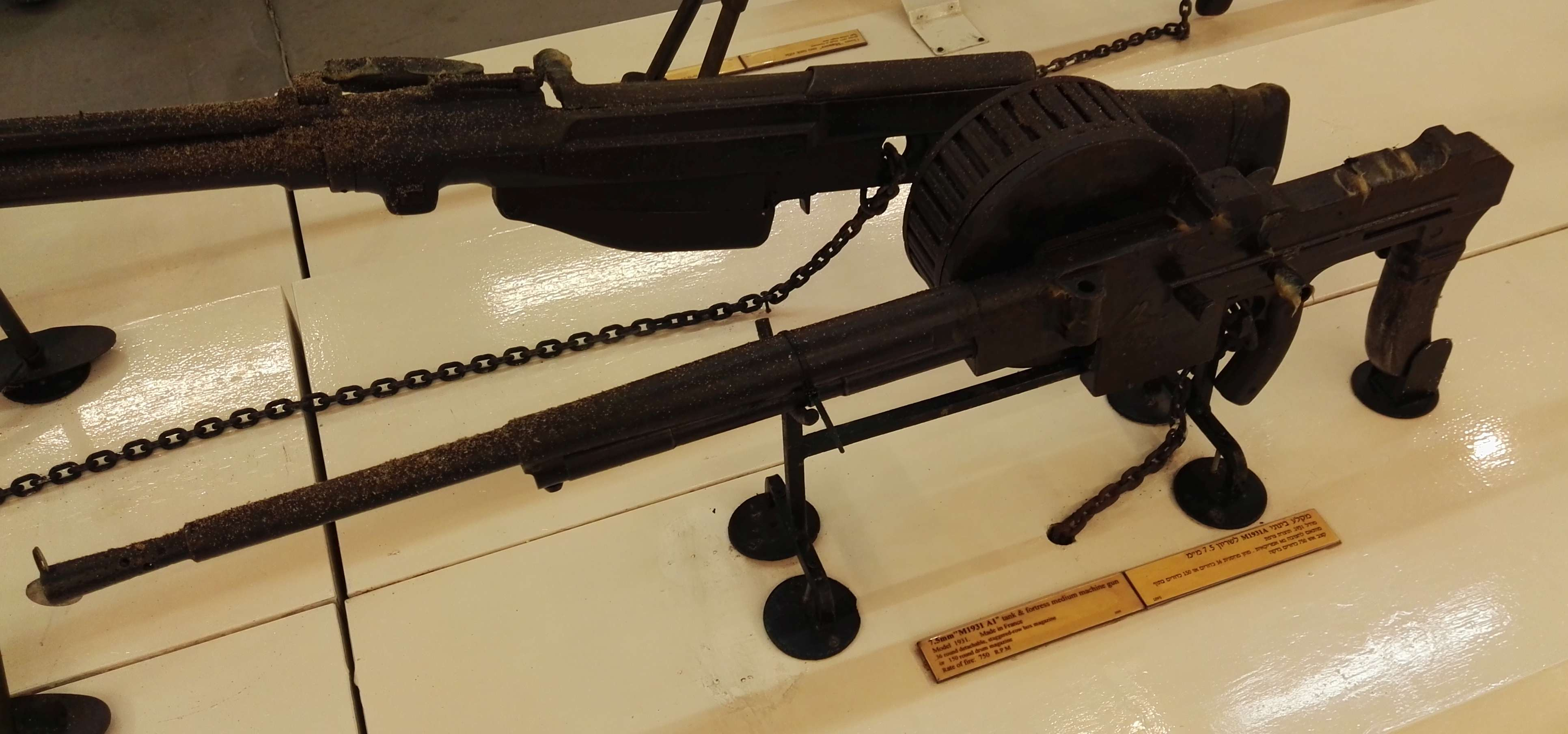
Opposite side of Reibel/MAC 1931 machine gun on display at Israel Defense Forces History Museum

The Reibel machine gun is a gas operated weapon chambered in the 7.5 mm MAS cartridge and was loaded with vertical, side-mounted, 150-round pan magazines. The variant used in fortifications was modified with a different rifling to accommodate the balle D heavy ball type of ammunition.

Some other guns in French service during the late 1940s were converted to ground role, with adoption of the side-mounted 35-round box magazines and adapters for US M2 tripods.

The modele 1931 machine gun is a gas operated weapon which fires from open bolt and in full automatic only. It is derived from the French FM 24/29 Fusil-Mitrailleur (light machine gun) also designed by Lt Colonel Reibel, and based on the Browning Automatic Rifle. The FM 24/29 was developed into a heavier machine gun capable of relatively sustained fire, by giving it an extremely thick and massive barrel, to act as a heat sink. This was necessary, since the FM 24/29 lacked a quick-change barrel or water-cooling and its normal light barrel would rapidly overheat and wear out, if fired in more than short bursts, with cooling rests between. The long stroke gas piston is located below the barrel and operates the vertically tilting bolt group. Ammunition is fed from side-mounted multi-layer 150-round pan magazines (with bullets pointing to the center of the round magazine). The gun can be modified to take magazines on either the left or right side, to ease magazine changes while mounted in the standard side-by-side JM twin-mount. Ejection is straight down, through the short chute attached to the base of the receiver, which in fortifications, usually led into a longer tube or chute that directed the spent cases into the ditches outside. The gun was fitted with a forward-curved pistol grip to aid control and a standard rifle-style trigger. When mounted in fortifications, the twin-mount included an adjustable twin-shoulder stock, a tubular metal bar that extended from the rear of the mounting frame, which mounted a horizontal crossbar, with shoulder pads on each end. The operator would face the breeches of the guns and place these pads against his shoulders. He would then use his body to control traverse, while his hands would grip the pistols grips to fire one or both guns. Elevation was controlled by a brass crank underneath the weapon. Twin mountings came in T and F configurations; F types used standard triggers and stocks and were used for embrasure mounts in casemates and cupolas, while the T featured a trigger operated by Bowden cable and was intended for remote use in retractable turrets.

The standard for a mle 1931 in fixed emplacements was a JM Reibel twin-mount, complete with telescopic sight, azimuth and level indicators, elevation screw and spent case ejection chutes. It was manned by a crew of eight, including two gunners, two loaders, two assistant loaders (to fetch ammunition and reload pan magazines with a table-mounted reloading machine that took standard 5-round stripper clips), a mechanic to repair any faults or jams, and a commander to direct or coordinate fire. The purpose of pairing the guns was to allow for sustained and rapid fire. During normal use, the two guns would be fired in turn, allowing the other gun time to cool down. When called for, both guns could be fired together, increasing instantaneous rate of fire. Charts were posted on the walls in each emplacement, outlining standard operating technique:

- normal fire was 150 rounds (one magazine) per minute, alternating between guns. Each gun would be fired for one minute, in bursts, until the magazine was empty. Then, the gunner would stop, and fire the second gun for a minute while the first gun cooled and was reloaded. Then the first gun could be used again. This rate of fire could be sustained for 3 minutes per gun, before the accumulated heat built to a dangerous level.
- Accelerated rate was 450 rounds per minute (3 magazines) per gun and was achieved in the same way as normal fire; the gunner would fire off three magazines within a minute and then stop before his barrel overheated, and then repeat with the second. Due to the higher rate of fire, accelerated fire was limited to a maximum of two minutes per gun, since the guns would be so heated after firing 6 magazines each, they would be ready to overheat, even with a minute to cool down after the first 3 magazines.
- Rapid fire; In cases of emergency, such as enemy crossing the barbed wire, the gunners were authorized to rapid-fire bursts of 75 rounds per gun, either in turn or simultaneously, allowing a full magazines worth to be fired in much less than a minute. Such a rapid rate would very quickly overheat the barrel if not limited to only 75 rounds. To help cool the guns down faster, buckets of water and water sprayers were kept next to each JM emplacement. Barrels were cooled either by spraying them with water (evaporative) or by removing the gun from the mount and dipping the barrel into the water bucket. Up to 20 liters of water could be used per day per emplacement just to cool the barrels.

The JM mount consisted of a thick, metal, square frame, sized to fit into a standard French fortification embrasure (opening); the guns were mounted on an equally heavy-duty pivoting cradle inside this frame. The square frame fitted snugly into the embrasure and was attached by hinges and bolts. This ensured that there were no gaps where enemy bullets could enter into the bunker (except the very small opening that the telescopic sight peeped through), yet allowed the guns to be aimed and trained on anyone outside the walls. Emplacements were often shared with an anti-tank gun sharing the same embrasure opening; the JM mount would be hinged back, and the anti-tank gun slid forward on its ceiling-mounted rail, until its barrel was outside and breech inside. It was surrounded by a similar square frame, which fitted tightly into the embrasure. The only time the occupants of the bunker were exposed to enemy fire, was in the brief moments when switching the machine gun mounting for an artillery mount.

== Users ==
- Bulgaria, used on the Hotchkiss H35 light tank.
- Chad, used dismounted by governmental Armée Nationale Tchadienne during Chadian Civil War (1965–79).
- China, used on the Renault UE Chenillette.
- Croatia, used on the Hotchkiss H35 light tank.
- France, used on armoured vehicles, such as AMR 33, Renault FT or Panhard EBR and on fortifications. During the Indochina War, M1931As were used on vehicles or dismounted on tripods.
- Germany, captured examples. The MAC-1931 model served as Kpfw. MG 311(f).
- Hungary, used on the Hotchkiss H35 light tank.
- Israel, used on the Hotchkiss H35 light tank.
- Italy, used on Renault R35 light tank.
- Lebanon, used on Renault R35 light tank.
- Poland, used on Renault R35 light tank.
- Switzerland, used on Renault R35 light tank.
- Syria, used on Renault R35 light tank.
- Turkey, used on Renault R35 light tank.
- Yugoslavia, used on Renault R35 light tank.

=== Non state groups ===
- Chetniks, used on the Hotchkiss H35 light tank.
- Yugoslav Partisans, used on the Hotchkiss H35 light tank.
- Viet Minh, used dismounted.
- Viet Cong

== See also ==
- FM-24/29, the BAR-based box-magazine fed LMG that the mle 1931 was based on
- MAC 1934, a faster-firing, belt-fed derivative of the mle 1931 used aboard aircraft
