= 7.5×54mm French =

French rifle cartridge

7.5×54mm MAS mod. 1929
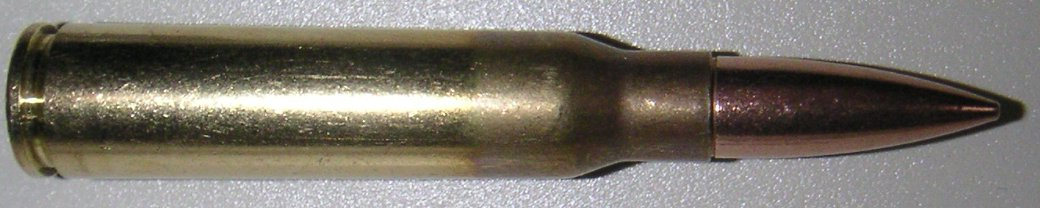
- Type: Rifle
- Place of origin: France

Service history
- In service: 1929–1990
- Used by: France, Germany, Vietnam, Cameroon
- Wars: World War II; First Indochina War; Algerian War; Suez Crisis; Vietnam War; Shaba II; Anglophone Crisis

Production history
- Designer: MAS
- Designed: 1924
- Variants: Balle "C", Balle "D"

Specifications
- Parent case: 7.5×57mm MAS mod. 1924
- Case type: Rimless, bottleneck
- Bullet diameter: 7.84 mm (0.309 in)
- Land diameter: 7.57 mm (0.298 in)
- Neck diameter: 8.66 mm (0.341 in)
- Shoulder diameter: 11.30 mm (0.445 in)
- Base diameter: 12.25 mm (0.482 in)
- Rim diameter: 12.34 mm (0.486 in)
- Rim thickness: 1.40 mm (0.055 in)
- Case length: 54.00 mm (2.126 in)
- Overall length: 76.00 mm (2.992 in)
- Case capacity: 3.76 cm^{3} (58.0 gr H_{2}O)
- Rifling twist: 270 mm (10.63 inches)
- Primer type: Berdan or Boxer Large rifle
- Maximum pressure (C.I.P.): 380.00 MPa (55,114 psi)

Ballistic performance
| Bullet mass/type | Velocity | Energy |
|---|---|---|
| 9.0 g (139 gr) Balle C FMJ | 820 m/s (2,700 ft/s) | 3,026 J (2,232 ft⋅lbf) |
| 9.0 g (139 gr) FMJ Privi Partizan | 830 m/s (2,700 ft/s) | 3,104 J (2,289 ft⋅lbf) |
| 9.0 g (139 gr) SP | 850 m/s (2,800 ft/s) | 3,550 J (2,620 ft⋅lbf) |
| 11.7 g (181 gr) SP | 790 m/s (2,600 ft/s) | 3,650 J (2,690 ft⋅lbf) |
| 12.35 g (191 gr) Balle D FMJ | 694 m/s (2,280 ft/s) | 2,974 J (2,194 ft⋅lbf) |
- Test barrel length: 574 mm (22.60 in) and 600 mm (23.62 in); Source: C.I.P. SurplusRifle.com /Cartridges of the World

The 7.5×54mm French, 7.5 French, or 7.5 MAS (designated as the 7,5 × 54 MAS by the C.I.P.) is a rimless bottlenecked rifle cartridge. It was developed by France as an update to the 7.5×57mm MAS mod. 1924 cartridge. It replaced the obsolete 8×50mmR Lebel round used during World War I, and served as the French service cartridge until superseded by the 5.56×45mm NATO and 7.62×51mm NATO cartridges in the 1970s and 1980s.

The 7.5×54mm French MAS has an uncommon 12.39 mm (0.488 in) breech and breechface diameter, and it has ballistics comparable to the 7.62×51mm NATO/.308 Winchester round. The 7.5 French cartridge is somewhat similar in appearance to the slightly longer and thicker 7.5×55mm Swiss GP11 round but users should never try to interchange the two rounds.

== History ==
By the end of World War I the French Army realized that it needed to update its once revolutionary, but now obsolete, 8 mm Lebel ammunition. Due to the demands of mass production of the 8mm Lebel round during World War I it was not able to do so until the war had ended in November 1918. Six years later, in 1924, the 7.5×57mm MAS cartridge was introduced. However it lasted only until 1929 when it was replaced with the slightly shorter 7.5×54mm MAS 1924-M29, due to the original cartridge being very similar in size and appearance to the German 7.92×57mm Mauser. As a result, a French soldier could potentially chamber a 7.92×57mm cartridge (which were also in fairly extensive use by the French military, e.g. in machine guns obtained as war reparations) and cause a massive failure if fired in a rifle designed for the less powerful and smaller calibre 7.5×57mm. With the newer 54mm case, a 7.92×57mm Mauser round would be too long for the chamber and prevent incorrect ammunition from being used. Two bullet variations were tested for military use at the time, the light bullet Mle 1924 Balle C and heavy bullet Mle 1924 Balle D.

The French Army chose to adopt "light ball" 9.0 grams (139 gr) Balle C flat base spitzer bullet ammunition for universal service in the MAS-36 and MAS-49 rifles as well as in the Mle 1924-29 machine rifle. The "heavy ball" 12.35 grams (190.6 gr) Balle 1929 D featured a boat-tailed spitzer bullet and had limited specialized use in automatic weapons like the Mle 1931 F and the FM Mle 1924M29 machine guns.

Other variations of the 7.5×54mm French military round are: armor-piercing (Balle P [Perforante]), tracer (Balle T [Traçante]), armor-piercing tracer (Balle TP [Traçeuse-Perforante]), incendiary (Balle I [Incendiaire]), gallery practice and blank. The 7.5mm×54 French round was historically considered a war material until 2013 when the new Code de la sécurité intérieure (Homeland security code) changed its classification to category C (subject to declaration for owning).

== Cartridge dimensions ==
The 7.5×54mm French has 3.76 ml (58.0 grains H_{2}O) cartridge case capacity. The exterior shape of the case was designed to promote reliable case feeding and extraction in bolt-action rifles and machine guns alike, under extreme conditions.

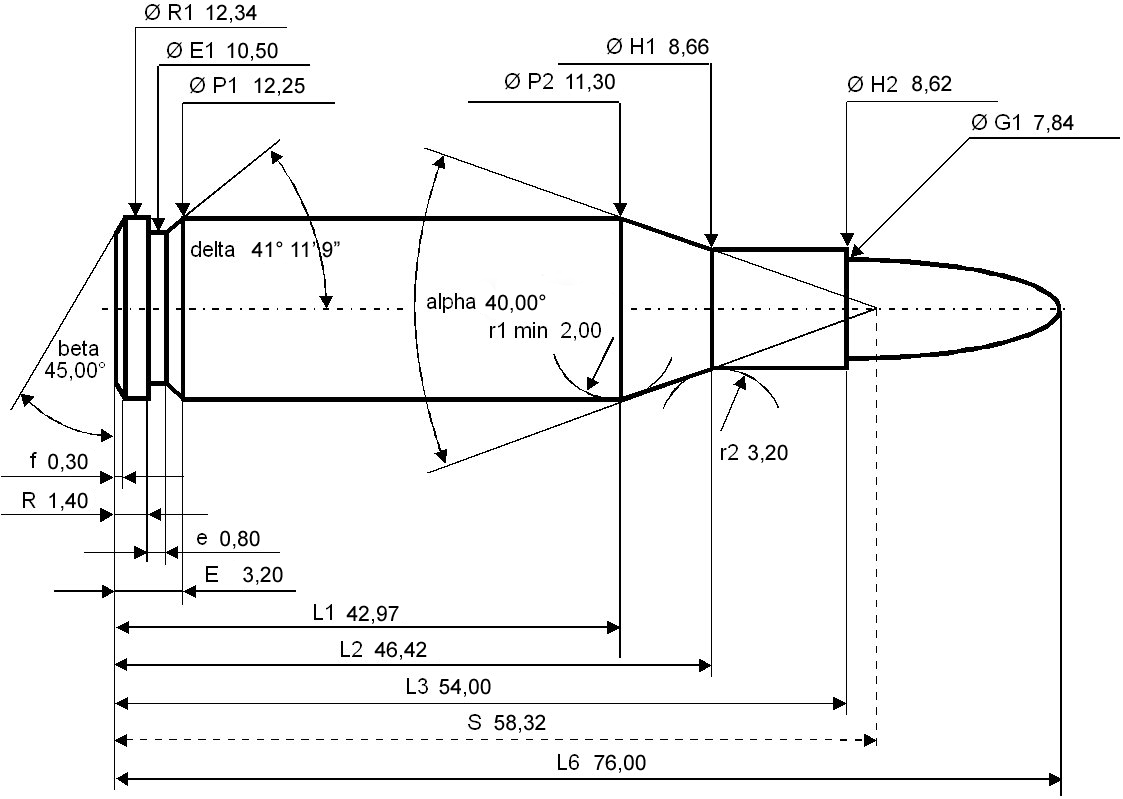

7.5×54mm French maximum C.I.P. cartridge dimensions. All sizes in millimeters (mm).

Americans would define the shoulder angle at alpha/2 = 20 degrees. The common rifling twist rate for this cartridge is 270 mm (1 in 10.63 inches), 4 grooves, Ø lands = 7.57 mm (0.298 in), Ø grooves = 7.85 mm (0.309 in), land width = 3.70 mm (0.146 in). However, fortress machine guns in the Maginot Line used 235 mm twist rate since they were designed for a heavier, Mle 1933D bullet. The primer type is Berdan (military ammo) or Boxer (some commercial ammo) Large rifle.

According to the official C.I.P. (Commission Internationale Permanente pour l'Epreuve des Armes à Feu Portatives) rulings the 7.5×54mm French can handle up to 380.00 MPa (55,114 psi) P_{max} piezo pressure. In C.I.P. regulated countries every rifle cartridge combo has to be proofed at 125% of this maximum C.I.P. pressure to certify for sale to consumers. This means that 7.5×54mm French chambered arms in C.I.P. regulated countries are currently (2017) proof tested at 475.00 MPa (68,893 psi) PE piezo pressure.

The American 7.62×51mm NATO/.308 Winchester cartridge, which succeeded it in French military use, offers similar ballistics compared to the 7.5×54mm French.

== Availability ==
The original French-made military ammunition tends to be scarce in the United States and is often corrosive and always Berdan-primed. The pressure is rated at around 40,000 CUP or about 295 MPa (42,800 psi). The original military brass is highly prone to head separation when reloaded above 40,000 CUP. The reason is that the military Berdan-primed cartridges were made with a specially scored internal annular groove between the head and body to purposely weaken the case and prevent reloading by enemy forces, which had apparently been a problem at one time for the French when they occupied Morocco. MAS 36 bolt-action rifles are capable of handling pressure much higher than 40,000 CUP. For the handloader, 7.62mm NATO load data would work.

Reloadable Boxer-primed 7.5×54mm French cartridge cases can be produced by reforming 6.5×55mm (Swedish Mauser) brass with commercial case forming dies. The ammunition manufacturer Prvi Partizan has brought onto the U.S. market freshly manufactured reloadable non-corrosive 7.5×54mm French ammunition loaded with a 9.0 grams (139 gr) bullet that meets the specifications of the original round.

In countries where restrictions prevent civilian hunting use of firearms chambered in Military cartridges still considered "War Materiel" like the 7.5×54 French MAS, owners of surplus military firearms may have them changed to a different, non-military cartridge. The easiest and usually the cheapest way is to rechamber the firearm to something that uses the same barrel and bore, but removes the old military chamber during the re-chambering process. The C.I.P. has registered both the 30-284 NOLASCO and the extremely similar 30-284 Winchester (both considered "wildcat cartridges" based on the .284 Winchester in the US, but commercially made in Europe.) Both these chamberings completely remove the original 7.5×54 MAS chamber, and have the same pressure ratings as the 7.5×54 MAS cartridge. Both cartridges have the same cartridge case dimensions including a common maximum unloaded case length of 55.10mm, but their primarily difference lies in their loaded overall length (OAL). The 30-284 has a shorter OAL of 72mm, while the NOLASCO specifies a longer OAL of 76mm, the same as the 7.5×54 MAS. This can be helpful for loading longer bullets with better ballistic coefficients for hunting.

== Weapons chambered for 7.5×54mm MAS ==
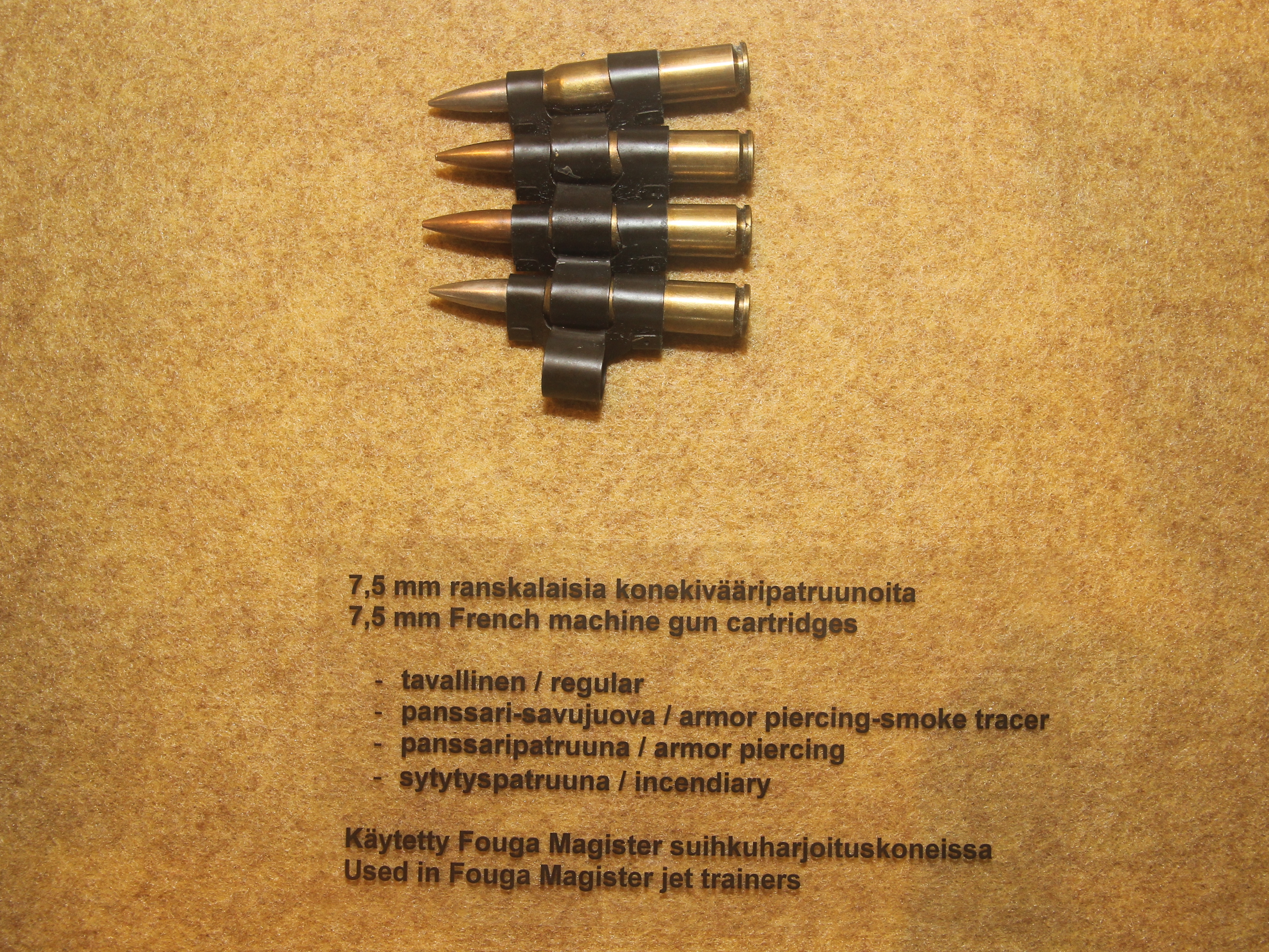
Belted 7.5×54mm French ammunition for use in the MAC 52 aircraft variant of the AA-52 machine gun.

- MAS-36 rifle
- MAS-49 and FSA MAS 49/56 rifles
- FR F1 sniper rifle
- FM 24/29 light machine gun
- Reibel machine gun
- Darne aircraft machine gun
- MAC 1931
- MAC 1934 aircraft machine gun
- FN-Browning mle 38 aircraft machine gun
- AA-52 machine gun
- Fusil Mle 1907/15-M34
- Lebel 1886-93 M27 (Two thirds of production. The first products are 7.5×58mm caliber.)

== See also ==
- List of rifle cartridges
- 7 mm caliber
