= National Guard (Mauritania) =

Mauritanian paramilitary force

Coordinates: 18°4′50″N 15°58′31″W

National Guard is the National Guard of Mauritania. It has its headquarters in Nouakchott, located opposite (west) to the College des Garçons. The National Guard of Mauritania cooperates closely with the National Locust Control Centre. The main job of the guard is patrolling remote desert areas, usually by camel.

Based on the French model, the National Guard is "responsible for working with other police forces and security agencies, and maintaining and restoring public order".
