= MAC 1934 =

- Type: Machine gun
- Place of origin: France

Service history
- Used by: See Users
- Wars: World War II; Algerian War

Production history
- Manufacturer: Manufacture d'armes de Châtellerault

Specifications
- Mass: 10.7 kg (24 lb)
- Length: 1,030 mm (3 ft 5 in)
- Barrel length: 851 mm (2 ft 9.5 in)
- Cartridge: 7.5 mm MAS
- Caliber: 7.5 mm
- Action: Gas
- Rate of fire: 1200-1450 rounds per minute
- Muzzle velocity: 830 m/s (2,722.4 ft/s)
- Feed system: drum or belt
- Sights: Alkan 35

The MAC 1934 is a machine gun of French origin. It is effectively the aircraft variant of the Reibel machine gun.

== History ==
In 1934, the Manufacture d'Armes de Châtellerault (Châtellerault weapons manufacturing company, often shortened to MAC) completed the development of the MAC 1934 machine gun to replace the Darne mod. 1933 machine gun aboard aircraft of the Armée de l'Air. Essentially a faster-firing variant of the mitrailleuse mle 1931, and using the same 7.5 mm MAS ammunition, the MAC 34 worked by gas operation and was fed from drum magazines. Two main variants, sharing common parts, were introduced:

- the type tourelle (turret model), fed from 100-round replaceable magazines, was used in flexible mountings, where it was generally fitted with an Alkan 1935 reflector gunsight.
- the type aile (wing model) fed from a 300- or 500-round drum magazine, was used for fixed mountings.

Because it used an open bolt action, the MAC 34 could not be fitted with synchronization gear, and was more expensive to manufacture than comparable weapons; but it was compact and had excellent reliability.

Originally the Armée de l'Air favoured magazine-fed weapons, but it eventually accepted that the feeding system of the MAC 34 would require too frequent reloadings for dorsal gunners, and was impractical for wing mountings, so it required the development of a belt-fed variant. The resulting weapon was introduced in 1939, and designated as MAC 1934 M39.

== Overview ==
The MAC 1934 machine gun equipped French aircraft from 1935 until the later 1940s. Like other rifle-calibre machine guns, the MAC 34 proved to be too light for combat in World War II. A weakness of the MAC 34 was its operation at high altitudes. It was found that at altitudes past 6,100 m (20,000 ft) the guns had a tendency to freeze. Heaters were added to the guns on the Morane-Saulnier M.S.406 to allow high altitude use. The Armée de l'Air had plans to use several types of heavy aircraft machine guns, including an 11 mm variant of the MAC 34, but none could be completed before the Armistice.

== Post World War II usage ==
The MAC 1934 was used in Algeria on Morane-Saulnier MS.500 light aircraft for anti guerilla operations around 1957. The Armée de l'Air installed the MAC 1934T as a defensive weapon aiming through the back window was dropped, although some aircraft have then been modified on the field to fire through one of the side windows.

== Users ==
- France

== See also ==
- List of firearms
- List of uncommon World War II weapons
- List of aircraft of the French Air Force during World War II

== Sources ==
- Danel, Raymond and Cuny, Jean. L'aviation française de bombardement et de renseignement 1918-1940 Docavia n°12, Editions Larivière
- Pelletier, Alain. French Fighters of World War II. Carrollton, TX: Squadron/Signal Publications, Inc., 2002. ISBN 0-89747-440-6.
