= MAC Mle 1950 =

French semi-automatic pistol

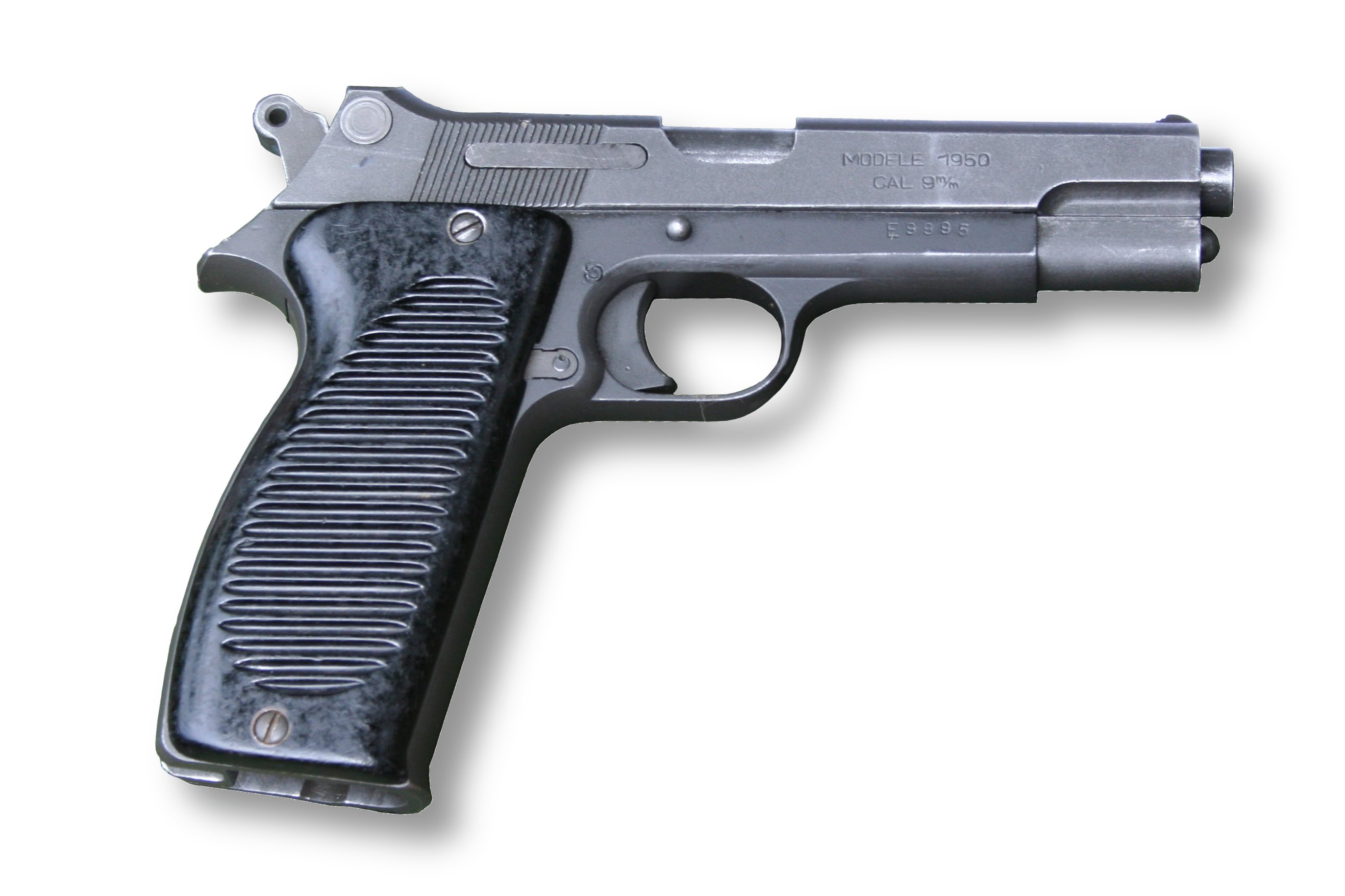
- MAC Mle 1950
- Type: Semi-automatic pistol
- Place of origin: French Fourth Republic / French Fourth Republic

Service history
- Wars: First Indochina War; Algerian War; Suez Crisis; Vietnam War; Lebanese Civil War; Chadian Civil War; Western Sahara War; Chadian–Libyan conflict Shaba II; Algerian Civil War; First Ivorian Civil War; Second Ivorian Civil War; Libyan civil war (2011); Libyan civil war (2014–2020)

Production history
- Designed: 1950
- Manufacturer: Manufacture d'armes de Châtellerault; MAS
- Produced: 1950–1970
- No. built: 341,900

Specifications
- Mass: 860 g (30 oz)
- Length: 195 mm (7.7 in)
- Barrel length: 111 mm (4.4 in)
- Height: 135 mm (5.3 in)
- Cartridge: 9×19mm Parabellum
- Action: Short recoil, locked breech, dropping barrel
- Muzzle velocity: 315 m/s (1,033 ft/s)
- Effective firing range: 50 m (160 ft)
- Maximum firing range: 1,900 m (6,200 ft)
- Feed system: 9-round detachable box magazine
- Sights: Fixed iron sights 155 mm (6.1 in) sight radius

The MAC 50 (also known as MAC 1950, MAS 50 or PA modèle 1950) is a standard semi-automatic pistol of the French army and adopted in 1950. It replaced the previous series of French pistols, the Modèle 1935A and Modèle 1935S, and was produced between 1950 and 1970, with around 341,900 being created during that timeframe.

It was first made by MAC (Manufacture d'armes de Châtellerault) then by MAS (Manufacture d'Armes St. Etienne - two of several government-owned arms factories in France)

It is now superseded by the PAMAS G1, the French version of the Beretta 92, and since 2020 by the 5th-generation Glock 17.

== History ==
In Châtellerault, 221,900 were made until it was closed in 1963, with production continuing in St. Étienne, where 120,000 pistols were made by 1978.

From 1953, the MAC 50 replaced the Modèle 1892 revolver, the MAS 35S, PA 35A, and other Colt 1911 models in the French armed forces, and the P38 in the CRS (riot police). It was the standard-issue sidearm for the French Gendarmerie (excluding specialised units) until its gradual replacement by the MAS G1 starting in 1989. It was also issued to the Penitentiary Service and certain branches of the National Police ( DST, PJ, RG, and PAF ). In 2000, fifty years after its initial introduction, the Army's MAC 50 began its phase-out and was replaced by a version of the Beretta 92, the PAMAS G1, which was previously issued to the National Gendarmerie, which now uses the SIG PRO SP2022.

In 2020, the Glock 17 became the standard-issue weapon in the French armed forces and was to completely replace the remaining MAC 50s.

== Design ==
It uses the Browning system like the FN GP 35 with an integral barrel feed ramp, it is a single-action trigger with slide mounted safety that locks the firing pin so the hammer can be lowered by pressing the trigger with safety engaged.

The MAC-50 is primarily based on the Modèle 1935S, for which MAC was the primary manufacturer, although it shares some characteristics with the Modèle 1935A, the design basis for the SIG P210 (SIG licensed the Modèle 1935A design from SACM in 1937).

== Users ==
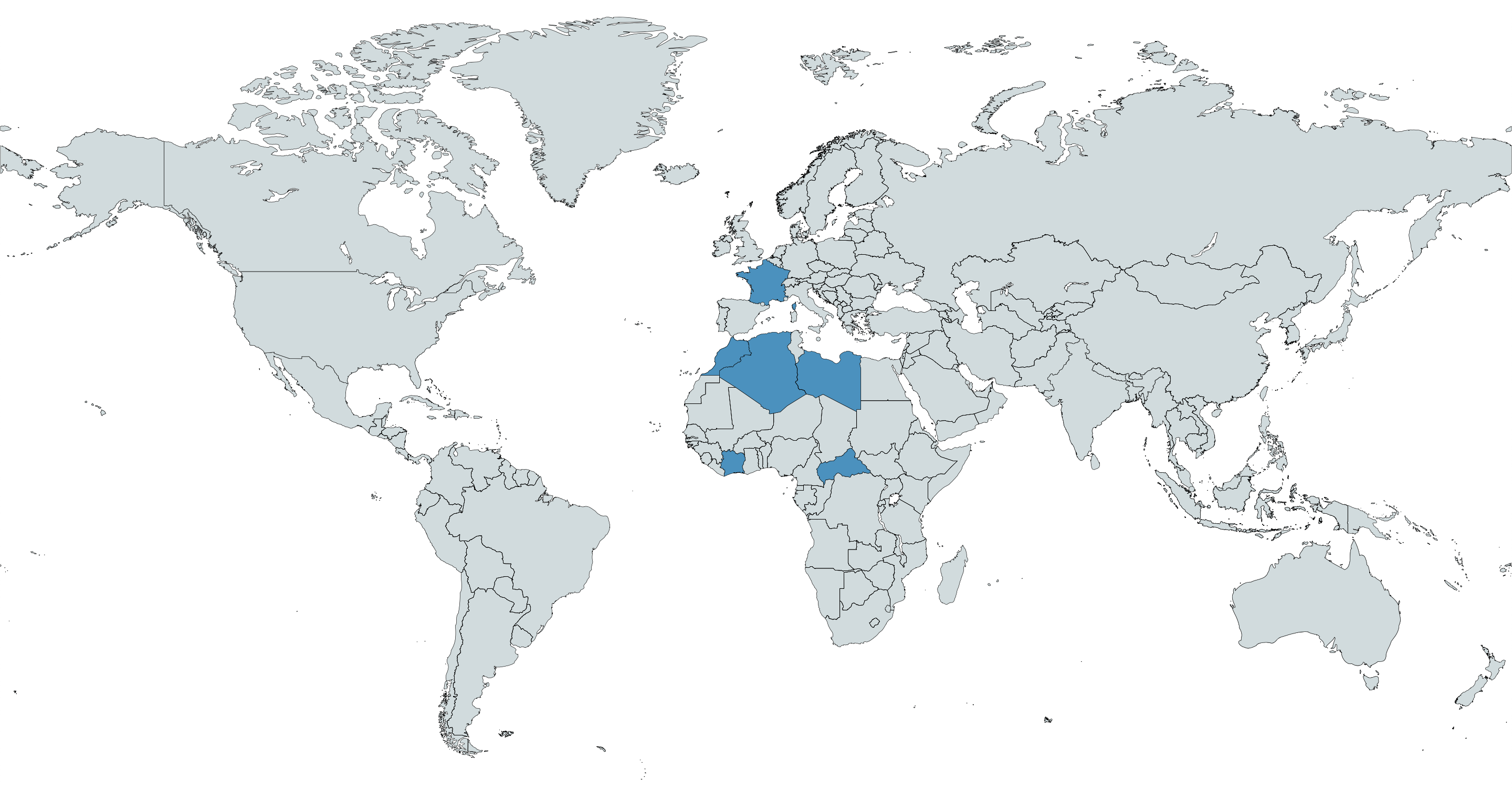
Map with MAC-50 users in blue

- Algeria
- Central African Republic: Armée de Terre and Gendarmerie
- France
  - French Armed Forces
  - Police Nationale
- Ivory Coast
- Lebanon
- Libya
- Morocco
- /Ukraine

=== Former ===
- Central African Empire
- First Republic of Ivory Coast
- Lebanon - (flag 1943 -1990 with brown trunk)
- Socialist People's Libyan Arab Jamahiriya
- (France) French Fourth Republic
