= Manufacture d'armes de Châtellerault =

French state-owned weapons manufacturer

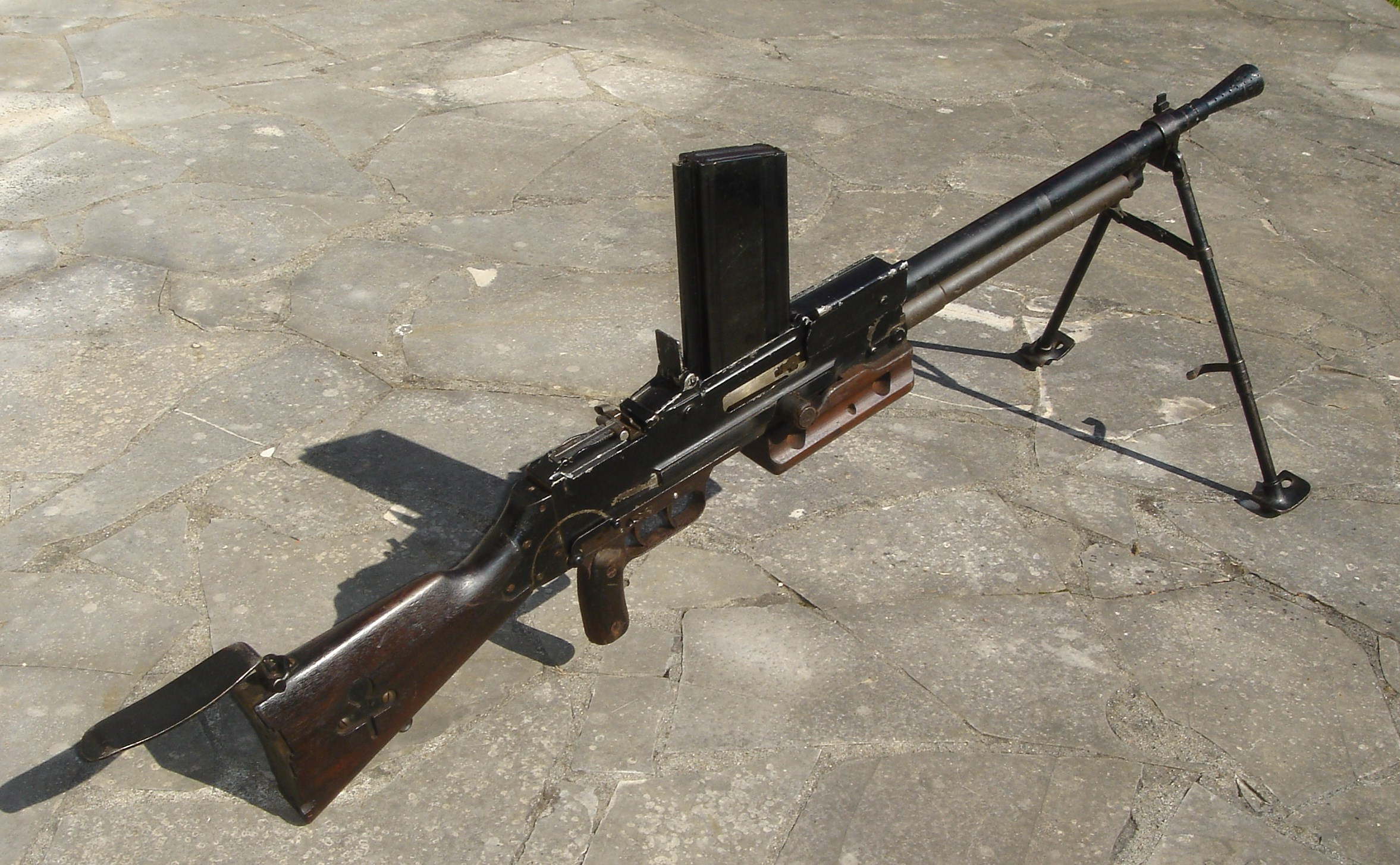
FM 24/29

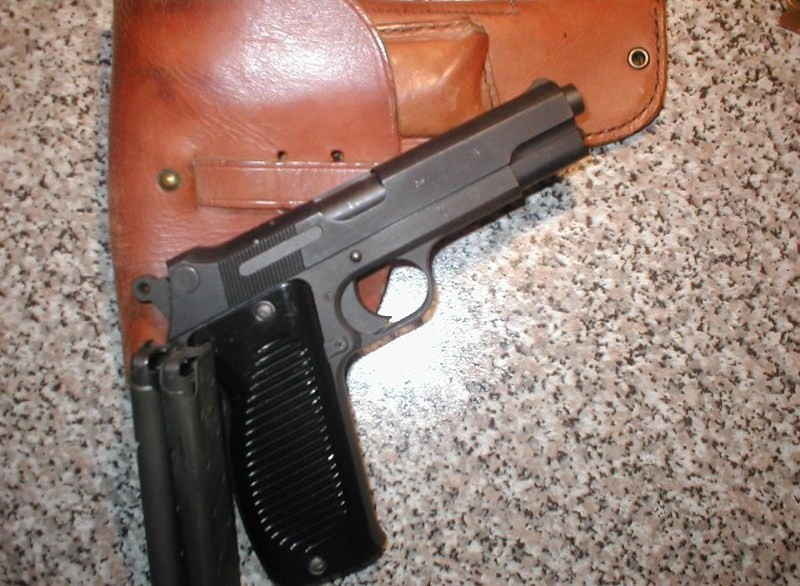
MAC 1950

The Manufacture d'Armes de Châtellerault (French pronunciation: [manyfaktyʁ daʁm də ʃatɛlʁo], "Châtellerault Weapons Factory", abbr. MAC) was a French state-owned weapons manufacturer in the town of Châtellerault, Vienne. It was created by a royal decree of 14 July 1819 to manufacture swords, then (after 1850) firearms and cannons. Antoine Treuille de Beaulieu in 1840 began to develop the concept of rifled artillery at Châtellerault for the French Army. The Lebel Model 1886 rifle, the first military firearm to use smokeless powder ammunition and the primary French infantry weapon during World War I, was developed and produced here.

== History ==
Following the French tradition of state arsenals competing with each other and with private industry, MAC designed and manufactured several well-known French small arms, including the FM 24/29 light machine gun and its derivatives the MAC mle 1931 and MAC 1934 machine guns, as well as the MAC 1950 (later MAS 1950) semi-automatic pistol.

Some features of prototypes developed by MAC, including the MAC-48 submachine gun, MAC 1950 machine carbine and MAC 1955 automatic rifle, were retained in the production of other designers' weapons which were adopted by the French Army.

The facility closed as a weapons manufacturing facility in 1968 and was transformed into the central repository of all French military archives related to armament matters (Centre des Archives de l'Armement et du Personnel). It is open, for older declassified material, to bona fide researchers upon written request.

== See also ==
- Manufacture d'armes de Saint-Étienne
- Manufacture d'armes de Bayonne
- Manufacture Nationale d'Armes de Tulle

== Sources ==
- Danel, Raymond and Cuny, Jean. L'aviation française de bombardement et de renseignement (1918/1940), Docavia n°12, Editions Larivière.
- De Vries, G. and Martens, B. J. The MKb 42, MP43, MP44 and the Sturmgewehr 44, Propaganda Photo Series, Volume IV, Special Interest Publicaties BV, Arnhem, The Netherlands, First Edition, 2001.
- Ezell, Edward Clinton. Small Arms of the World, Arms & Armour Press, London, Eleventh Edition, 1977.
- Ferrard, Stéphane. France 1940 l'armement terrestre, ETAI, 1998. ISBN 2-7268-8380-X
- Gotz, Hans Dieter. German Military Rifles and Machine Pistols, 1871-1945, Schiffer Publishing, West Chester, Pennsylvania, 1990. OCLC 24416255
- Huon, Jean. Les fusils d'assaut français, Editions Barnett, 1998. ISBN 2-9508308-6-2.
- Lombard, Claude. La Manufacture Nationale d'Armes de Châtellerault, Brissaud, Poitiers (France), 1987. ISBN 2-902170-55-6
- Pelletier, Alain. French Fighters of World War II, Squadron/Signal Publications, Inc., Carrollton, Texas, 2002. ISBN 0-89747-440-6
- Smith, W. H. B. Small Arms of the World : The Basic Manual of Military Small Arms, Stackpole Books, Harrisburg, Pa., 1955. OCLC 3773343
- Wollert, Günter; Lidschun, Reiner; Kopenhagen, Wilfried. Illustrierte Enzyklopädie der Schützenwaffen aus aller Welt: Schützenwaffen heute (1945–1985), Militärverlag der Deutschen Demokratischen Republik, Berlin, 1988. OCLC 19630248
- Deutsches Waffen Journal
- Visier
- Schweizer Waffen Magazin
- Internationales Waffen Magazin
- Cibles
- AMI
- Gazette des Armes
- Action Guns
- Guns & Ammo
- American Handgunner
- SWAT Magazine
- Diana Armi
- Armi & Tiro
