= AA-52 machine gun =

French general-purpose machine gun

AA-52
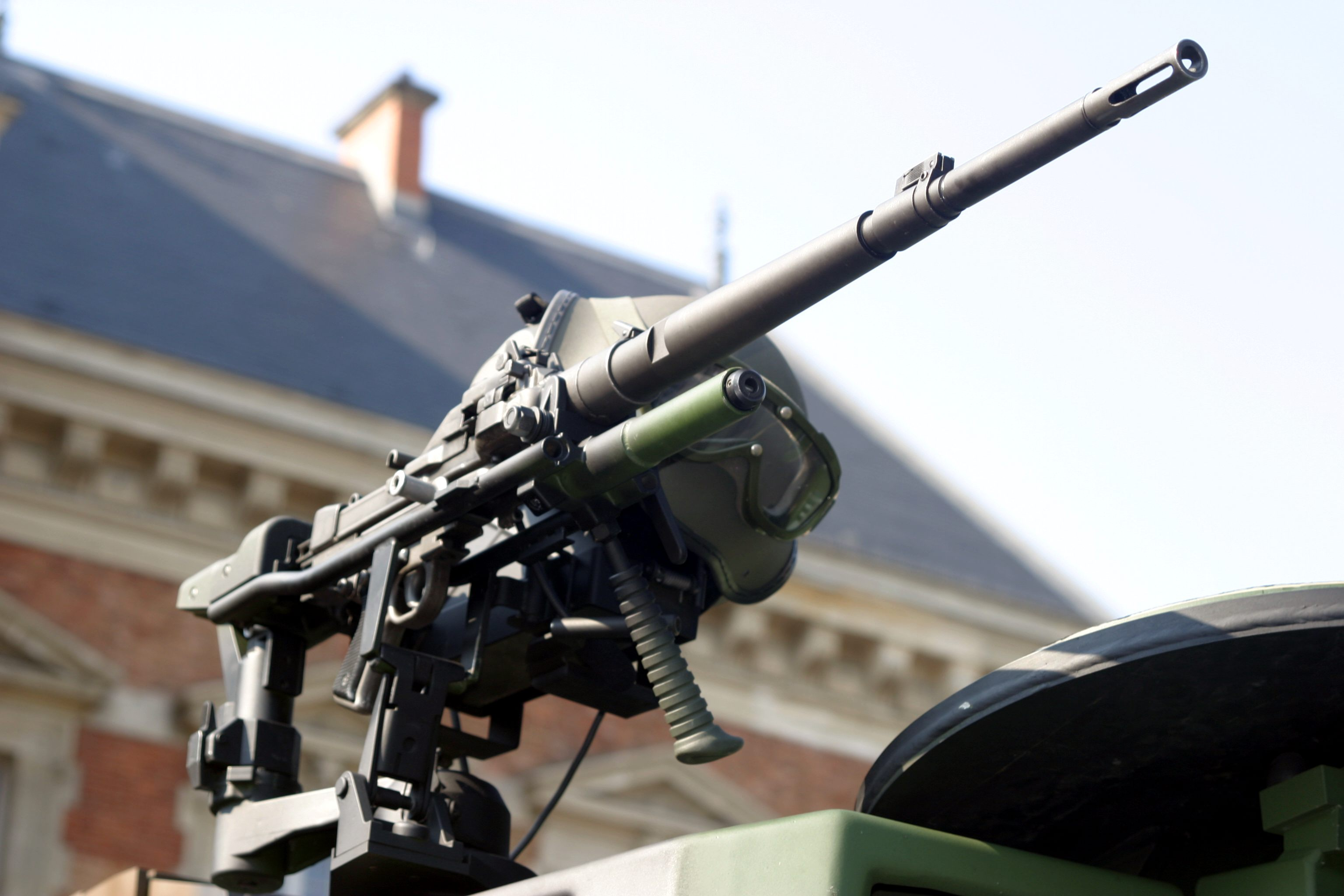
- AA-52 mounted on a Leclerc main battle tank
- Type: General-purpose machine gun
- Place of origin: French Fourth Republic/ / French Fifth Republic

Service history
- In service: 1952–present
- Used by: See Users
- Wars: Algerian War; Chadian Civil War; Shaba II; Lebanese Civil War; Gulf War; Bosnian War; War in Afghanistan; Ivorian Civil Wars; 2011 Libyan uprising Syrian Civil War; Centrafrican Civil War; Operation Serval; Russo-Ukrainian War

Production history
- Designed: 1952
- Manufacturer: Manufacture d'armes de Saint-Étienne (MAS)
- Variants: NF-1; M.A.C. 58

Specifications
- Mass: 9.97 kg (22.0 lb)
- Length: 1,080 mm (43 in)
- Barrel length: 600 mm (24 in)
- Cartridge: 7.5×54mm French; 7.62×51mm NATO
- Caliber: 7.5 mm 7.62 mm
- Action: Lever-delayed blowback
- Rate of fire: 900 round/min
- Muzzle velocity: 830 m/s (2,700 ft/s)
- Effective firing range: 600 m (660 yd)
- Maximum firing range: 3,200 m (3,500 yd)
- Feed system: 50-round non-disintegrating belt
- Sights: Iron; Removable APX (SOM) telescopic sights IR scope

The AA-52 (full designation in French: Arme Automatique Transformable Modèle 1952, "Transformable automatic weapon model 1952") is one of the first French-produced guns of the post–World War II era. It was manufactured by the French government-owned Manufacture d'armes de Saint-Étienne (MAS) company. The AA-52 is still used today as a vehicle-mounted weapon due to large quantities in service, but has been replaced in the helicopter role by the Belgian FN MAG, starting with the EC 725 Caracal of the special operations units and the Air Force search and rescue teams. The AA-52 had been largely phased out for infantry use in favour of the lighter FN Minimi but remains in use.

== History ==
The AA-52 general-purpose machine gun was conceived and developed following the French military's experiences in the First Indochina War during the early 1950s. At that time, the French army was equipped with an assortment of weapons from British and American sources, as well as some German weapons from the Second World War.

Effective supply of ammunition and replacement parts was an almost insoluble task and the army decided to adopt a standard machine gun. The result was the AA-52, conceived for ease of production. The construction is of simple welded stamped sheet steel.

The AA-52 was partially withdrawn from the service of the French army in 2008. It was replaced in the 2010s by 10,881 FN MAG general-purpose machine guns.

== Design ==
The AA-52 is a peculiar weapon among modern machine guns because it uses lever-delayed blowback operation, also seen in the FAMAS rifle, manufactured at the same factory. When firing, the pressure pushing the case head rearward initiates an impulse on a cam that sends the bolt carrier rearward. After a certain distance, a link (in this case the firing pin) pulls the bolt head, hence extracting the spent case. Since there is no primary extraction, the chamber is fluted to allow powder gases to flow back, unsticking the case from the chamber wall as with Heckler & Koch–type roller-delayed blowback weapons.

The feed and trigger mechanisms are derived from the MG 42.

The AA-52 can be used as a light machine gun with a bipod or as a heavy machine gun with a tripod. When used with a tripod for continuous fire, the gun is fitted with a heavier barrel. In the light machine gun configuration, the AA-52 is a relatively light weapon to carry. The AA-52 can be fired from the shoulder, but this is slightly awkward because of the position of the handle; however, the bipod can be used as a handguard when not in use. The barrel is changed by pressing a latch and rotating it a quarter of a turn. The APX(SOM) telescopic sight used on the MAS-49 and the FR-F1 sniper rifle can be mounted on the AA-52 as well as an infrared night sight.

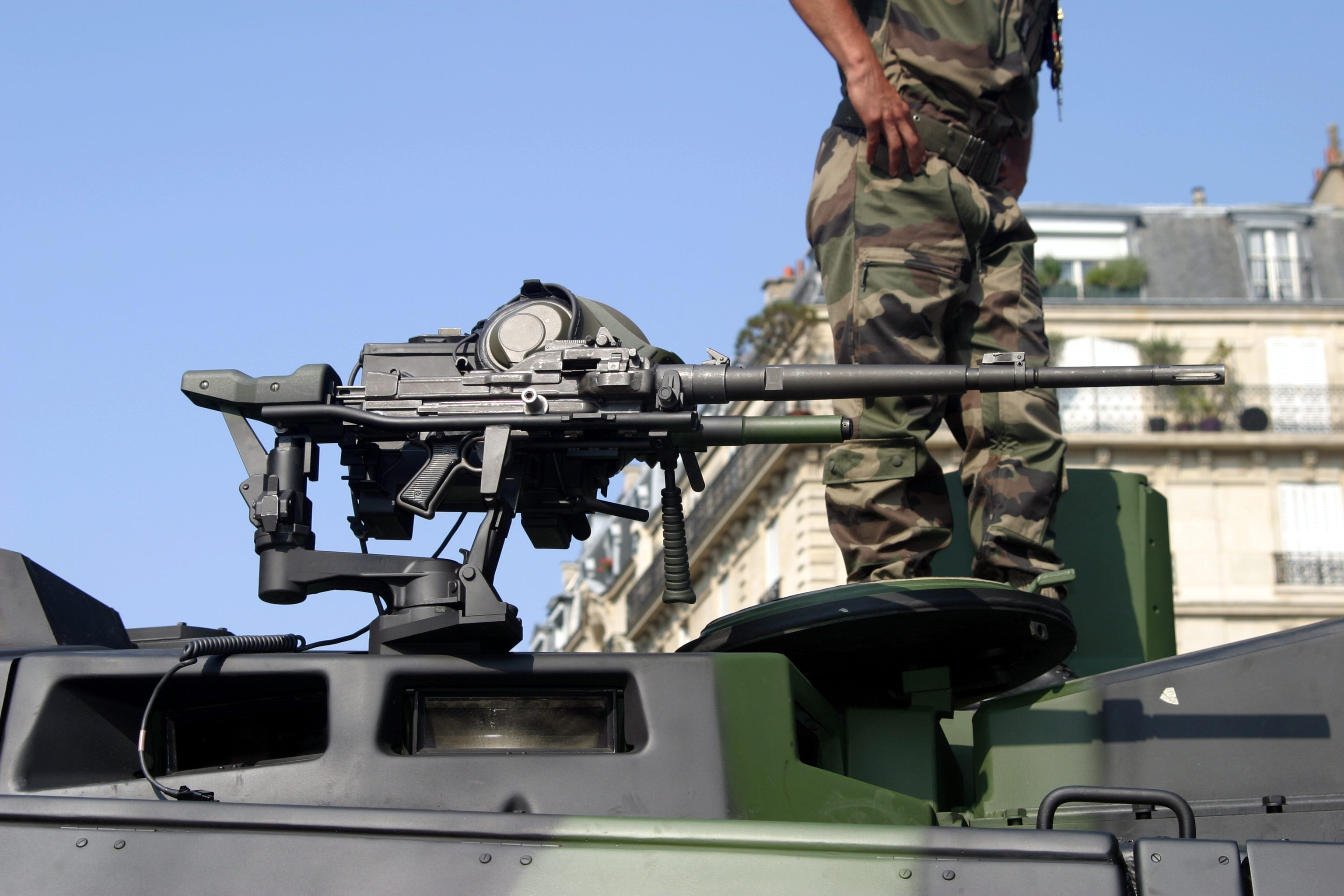
A vehicle-mounted AA-52

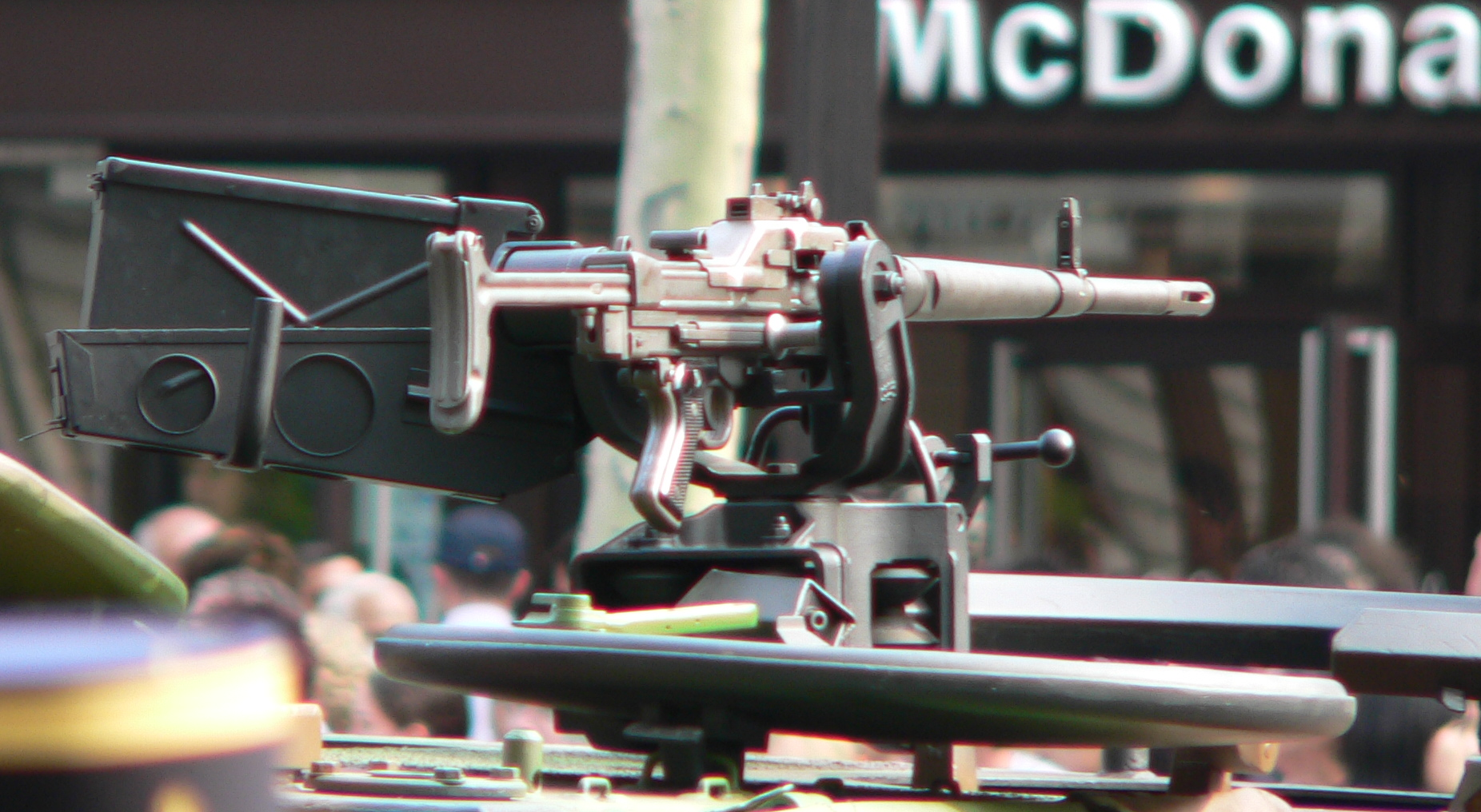
An AA-52 on a Véhicule Blindé Léger.

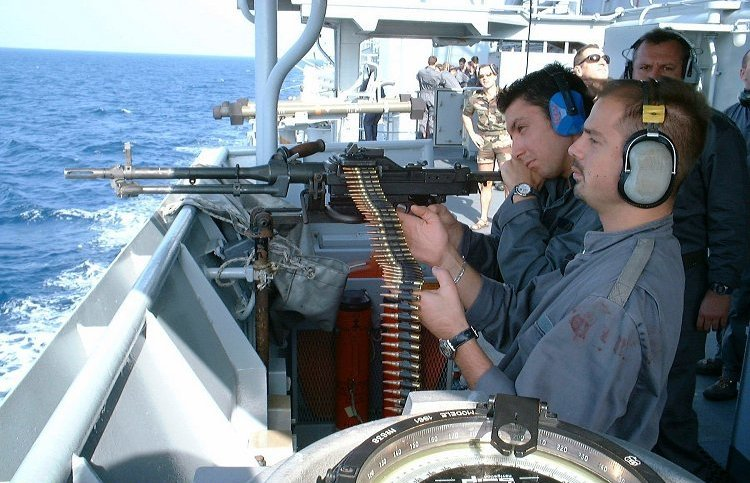
The ANF1 variant on La Motte-Picquet.

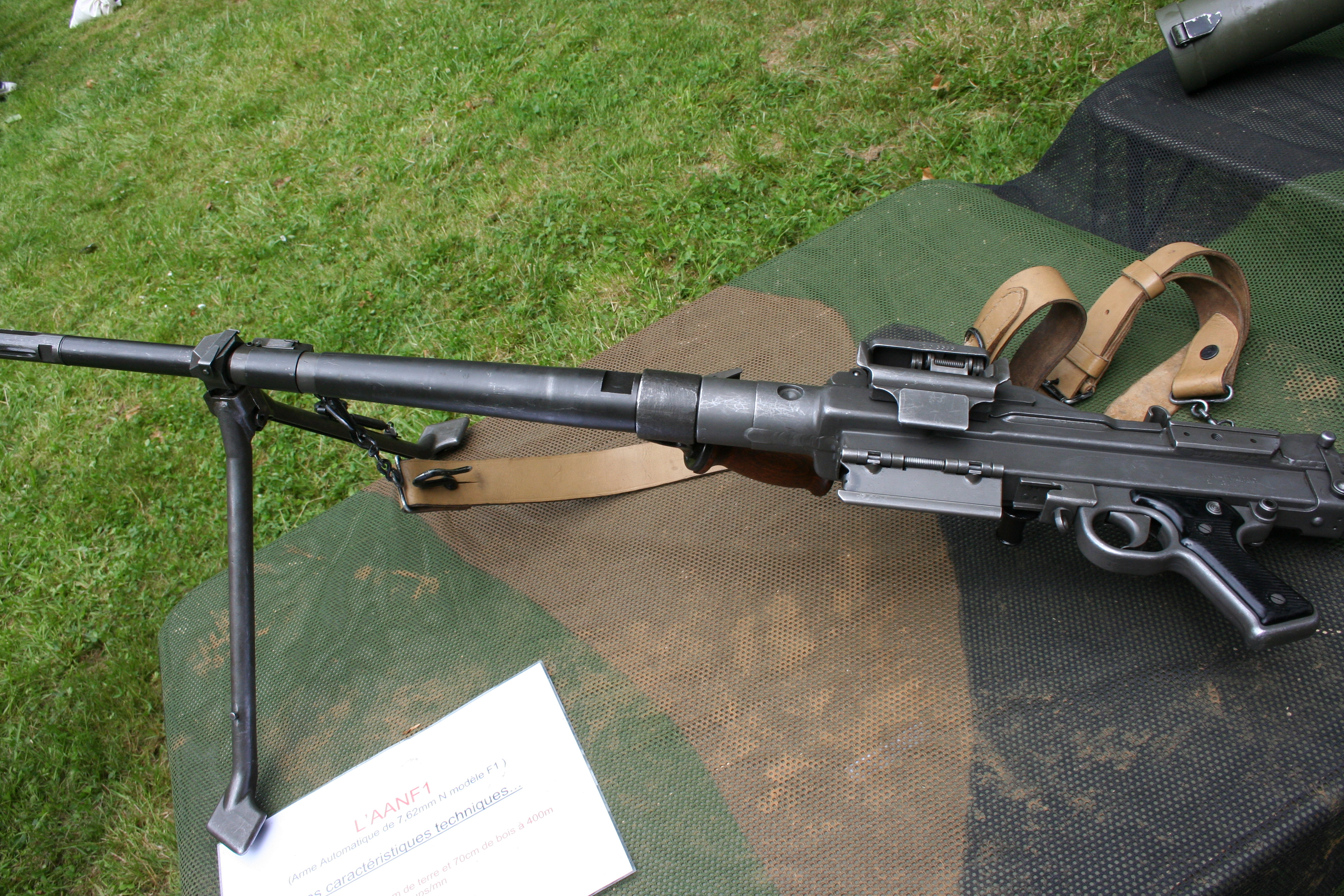
AA-52 machine gun on display.

== Variants ==
=== NF-1 ===
The AA-52 originally used the standard 7.5×54mm French cartridge. The general adoption of the 7.62×51mm NATO cartridge reduced the opportunity for export sales, and the gun was adapted for this standard NATO calibre. The new, adapted gun was designated AANF-1 (also ANF-1 or NF-1).

=== MAC-58 ===
The MAC-58 was a version of the AA-52 chambered in .50 BMG. A few prototypes were tested and one retained for preserial production, but it never reached production due to the large quantity of US M2 Browning machine guns already in service with the French armed forces.

== Users ==
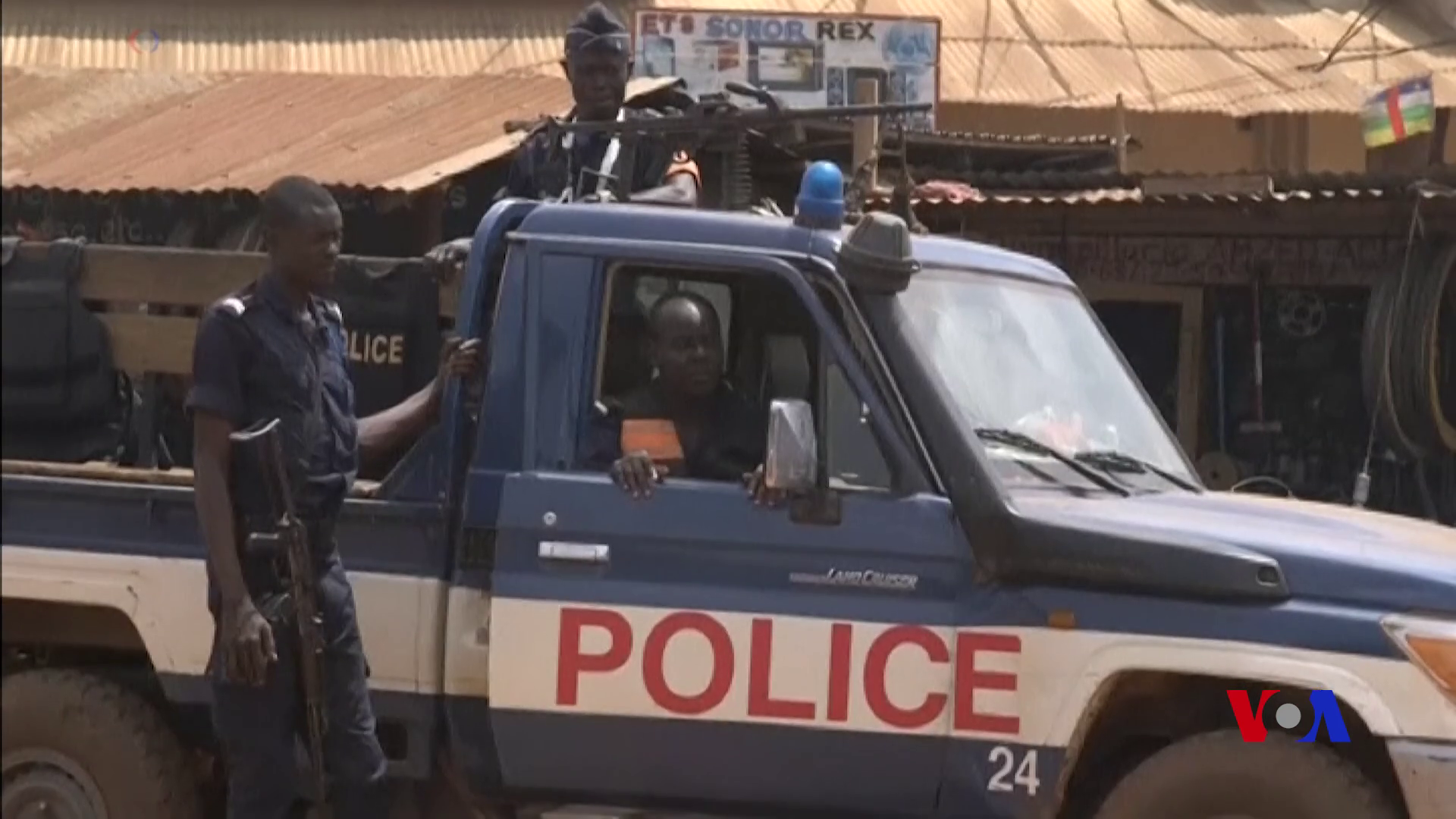
Pick-up of the Police of the Central African Republic with an AA-52 machine gun on the roof.

- National Reorganization Process / Argentina
- Belgium: Twin AA-52 machine guns were found in Fouga Magister attack aircraft.
- People's Republic of Benin / Benin
- Republic of Bolivia (1964–1982) / Republic of Bolivia (1982–2010) / Plurinational State of Bolivia
- Upper Volta / Burkina Faso
- Federal Republic of Cameroon / Cameroon
- Central African Empire / Central African Republic
- State of the Comoros / Comoros Federal Islamic Republic of the Comoros / Comoros
- Ivory Coast
- Djibouti
- Third Dominican Republic / Dominican Republic
- French Fourth Republic / France: F1 variant.
- Gabon
- Georgia / Georgia: used some ANF1 to protect Camp Warehouse, Afghanistan, under French command.
- Indonesia: AAT-F1 variant mounted on AMX-10 PAC 90 of Korps Marinir.
- Ireland: Twin AA-52 7.62mm machine guns were fitted to the Irish Panhard AML 60-7 CS armoured cars.
- Ivory Coast
- Lebanon mounted on VAB mephisto
- Democratic Republic of Madagascar / Third Republic of Madagascar / High Transitional Authority / Madagascar
- Mali: Armed and Security Forces of Mali
- Mauritania / Mauritania
- Morocco: F1 variant.
- Niger
- Senegal
- Seychelles / Seychelles
- Somali Democratic Republic Interim Government of Somalia / Somalia
- Togo
- Tunisia
- Ukraine
