= 7×54mm =

7×54mm may refer to:

- 7×54mm Finnish
- 7×54mm Fournier
