= 7×54mm Finnish =

Finnish rifle cartridge

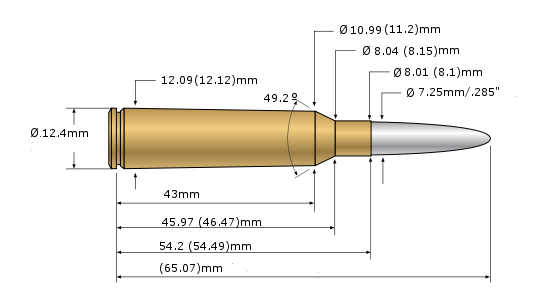
7×54mm Finnish

The 7×54mm Finnish is a rifle cartridge which was designed by Lapua as a moose hunting cartridge. It was loaded by two factories, Sako and Lapua in Finland from about 1944 until 1974. It is a 6.5×55mm SE necked up to take a 7mm (.285) bullet. It may be loaded with modified 6.5×55mm SE dies drilled to fit an 8mm neck diameter. It was usually loaded with a lightweight bullet.

Dimensions were measured from a cartridge loaded by Lapua and from (if two measurements) a case that had been shot with a modified Arisaka. Because the caliber is a wildcat, those can vary greatly. The rim diameter of the 6.5×55mm is 0.480" (12.20 mm).

== 7×54mm MAS ==
In 1948, the gunsmith M. Jean Fournier sold some hunting rifles based on the MAS-36 rifle and the 7.5×54mm cartridge Mod. 1929. As the French public could not use military cartridges, it was made possible in this case by reducing the caliber to 7mm, keeping the rest the same.

Not to be confused with the 7×54mm Finnish, the naming is similar, but the cartridges are not compatible.
