= FR F1 =

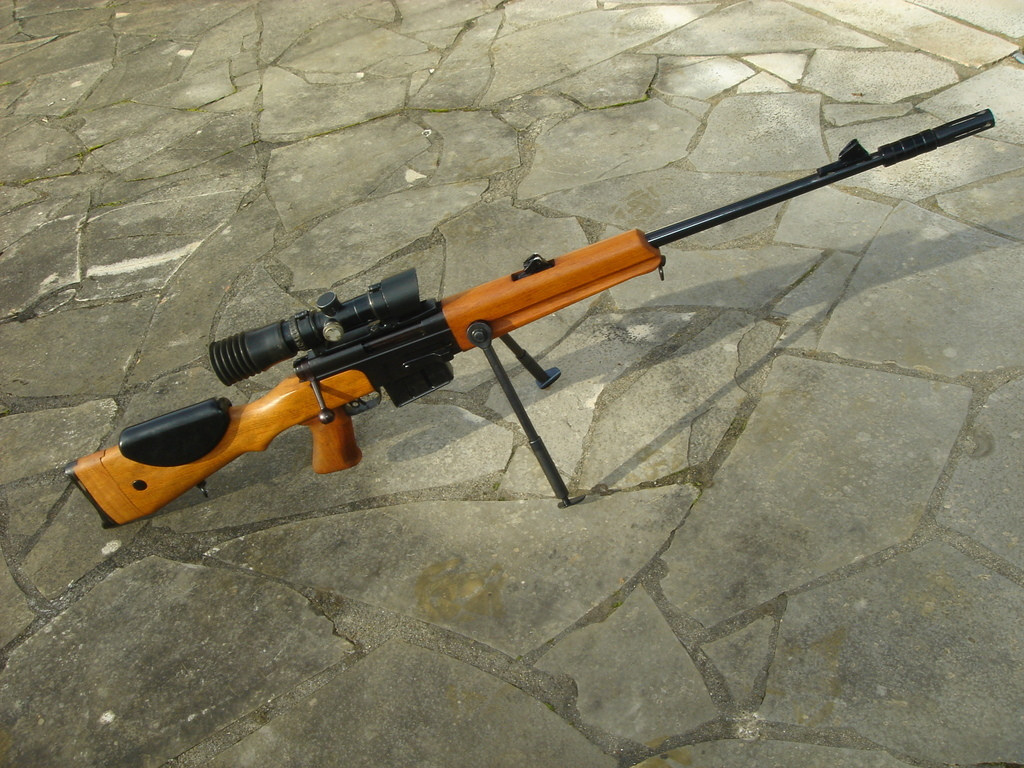
- FR F1
- Type: Sniper rifle
- Place of origin: France

Service history
- Used by: See Users
- Wars: Shaba II; Opération Tacaud; Lebanese Civil War; Gulf War

Production history
- Manufacturer: MAS GIAT Industries
- Produced: 1966–1980

Specifications
- Mass: 5.2 kg
- Length: 1138 mm
- Barrel length: 552 mm
- Cartridge: 7.5×54mm French; 7.62×51mm NATO
- Action: Bolt-action
- Muzzle velocity: 852 m/s
- Effective firing range: 800 m
- Feed system: 10-round detachable box magazine
- Sights: Telescopic sight

The FR F1 is a French sniper rifle manufactured by the Manufacture d'armes de Saint-Étienne (MAS); one of several government-owned arms factories in France. The FR F1 was France's first purpose-built precision rifle for sharpshooters. Introduced in 1966, the rifle was in use with the French Armed Forces until 1989 when it was replaced by the FR F2.

== History ==
In 1964, General Charles Ailleret requested the creation of a precision rifle to the General Staff of the Army. Development was entrusted to the Saint-Étienne arms factory, which took input from sports shooters in both the military and the civilian French Shooting Federation.

After several prototypes named the FR-P series, the new weapon was ready in 1966 and adopted as the FR F1. Around 6000 rifles were produced by 1980.

== Design ==
The original intention of the FR F1 was the creation of an accurized MAS-36, using as many parts from the older rifle as possible. As such, the FR F1 was originally designed around the 7.5×54mm MAS cartridge and it maintains partial parts compatibility with the MAS 36. The receiver of the FR F1 is fundamentally the same as the MAS 36 but designed to be stronger and thicker in order to increase accuracy, and are not interchangeable. The receiver of the FR F1 lacks cutouts for stripper clips and has a smaller ejection port than the MAS 36.

The basic rear-locking helical-lug bolt design was taken from the Japanese Arisaka Type 38 rifle and extensively modified and strengthened to reduce accuracy-inhibiting flex. On operation, the lugs cam the bolt forward during closure to obtain optimal cartridge seating.

The wooden pistol grip stock is adorned with a padded cheek rest and features a buttplate spacer system to adjust length of pull. A built-in bipod with adjustable spring-loaded telescopic legs is positioned mid-way along the length of the rifle, close to the center of gravity, to allow for long cycles of observation in firing positions without excessive fatigue of the user's arms. Although the legs telescope, this bipod is not considered fully adjustable as it does not allow for tilt or pan. The manual safety mechanism was copied from the Russian SVT-40, and the FR F1 is the first French-designed rifle to have a manual safety.

The standard FR F1 was equipped with the 3.85 power APX L806 telescopic sight designed for the MAS-49 rifle, for economical reasons. These scopes were manufactured with a center point reticle crossed by an interrupted center line, and an external bullet drop compensation calibrated for 7.5×54mm ammunition and adjustable from 100m to 800m in 100m increments; French army standard issue being a Model 53 bis. Adjustment of the graduated elevation turret visibly changes the height of the reticle in the objective. This sight was attached via a unique three-point mount operated by a side-mounted lever. The optic was detachable, but the mounts did not feature a repeatable zero, so optics were not typically removed under any circumstance.

The free-floating barrels are 554mm (~21.8in) long and have a right-hand twist with four grooves following a pitch of 300. In order to reduce weight, a relatively light barrel profile was chosen, which made the rifle more prone to point-of-impact shift from the heat buildup of extended firing sessions. This was deemed an acceptable consequence, as a lightweight rifle was prioritized.

The standard muzzle device is a two-piece adjustable four-slot flash hider, fitted with a sleeve on the barrel. For further accuracy tuning, the barrel has long threading to be used with a locking nut on the muzzle device in order to modify its position along the barrel, and hence influence the harmonic resonance behavior of the barrel. Best accuracy was found when the slots of the flash hider were aligned with the grooves of the rifling, and a specific tool for this was made. Overall accuracy of the weapon is very good, with some of the best shooters achieving sub-MOA accuracy at 200m.

Standard steel 10-round detachable box magazines had a rubber base pads which allowed the weapon to be placed hastily with less noise and risk of damage. A leather carrying strap completed the weapon system.

During its long service, the FR-F1 was equipped with various other optics such as 1.5-6x and 2.5-10x German scopes from Schmidt & Bender and Carl Zeiss AG, French Scrome optics, as well as Sopelem OB 50 night-vision devices for nighttime shooting. By 1976, every rifle in use with GIGN was equipped with a Zeiss scope.

== Variants ==
Three variants underwent development at MAS with two produced:

- Version A: sniper rifle with modified APX 806 L scope, folding night sights, folding bipod with telescopic arms and a trigger weight of 2 to 2.5 kg.
- Version B Tir sportif: competition rifle with micrometric sight, hooded front sight with interchangeable posts, no bipod and a lighter trigger weight ranging from 1.5 to 1.9 kg.
- Version C Grande chasse: A concept FR F1, intended for big-game hunting and chambered for a civilian caliber, that never went beyond the project stage and was never produced. Like the Version A, it was to have folding night sights and a trigger weight of 2 to 2.5 kg.

The FR-G1 and FR-G2 versions in 7.62×51mm NATO using original MAS 36 receivers were developed on the initiative of Nexter Systems, formerly known as GIAT Industries, at the request of the French Air Force. Development began in 1991 and production in 1994, with around 200 of each produced. Unlike the FR-F series rifles, FR-G rifles do not have iron sights and have a STANAG-style rail along the top of the receiver for optics. In military service, these rifles were replaced by the Heckler & Koch HK417.

There was to be an FR-G3 chambered in 7mm-08 Remington for commercial sale to the civilian market, however this never came to fruition.

== Users ==
- France: Used by the French army, but now replaced by the FR F2 sniper rifle. Snipers of the 2nd Parachute Regiment (Regiment Etranger Parachutiste; 2 REP) of the French Foreign Legion used FR F1 rifles when deployed to the Shaba province in southern Zaire in May 1978. The FR F1 rifle was also used by the GIGN counter-terrorist group in the rescue of 30 school children during a 1976 bus hijacking in Djibouti.
- Mauritania
- Morocco: Used by Royal Moroccan Gendarmerie.

== Gallery ==
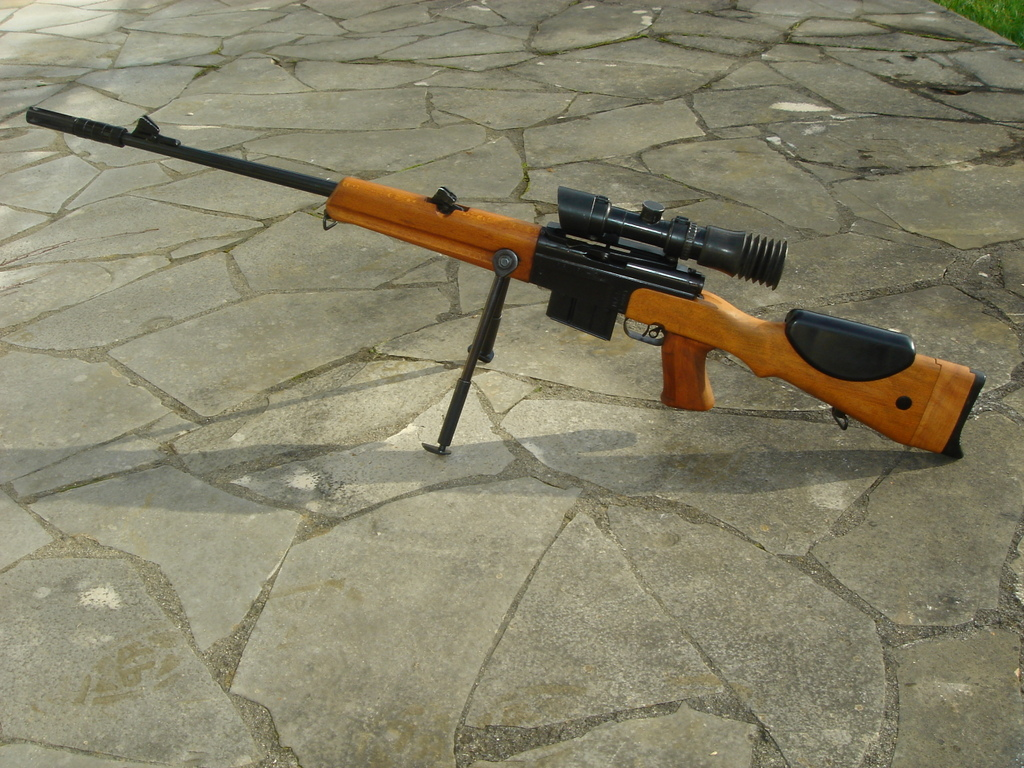
FR F1.

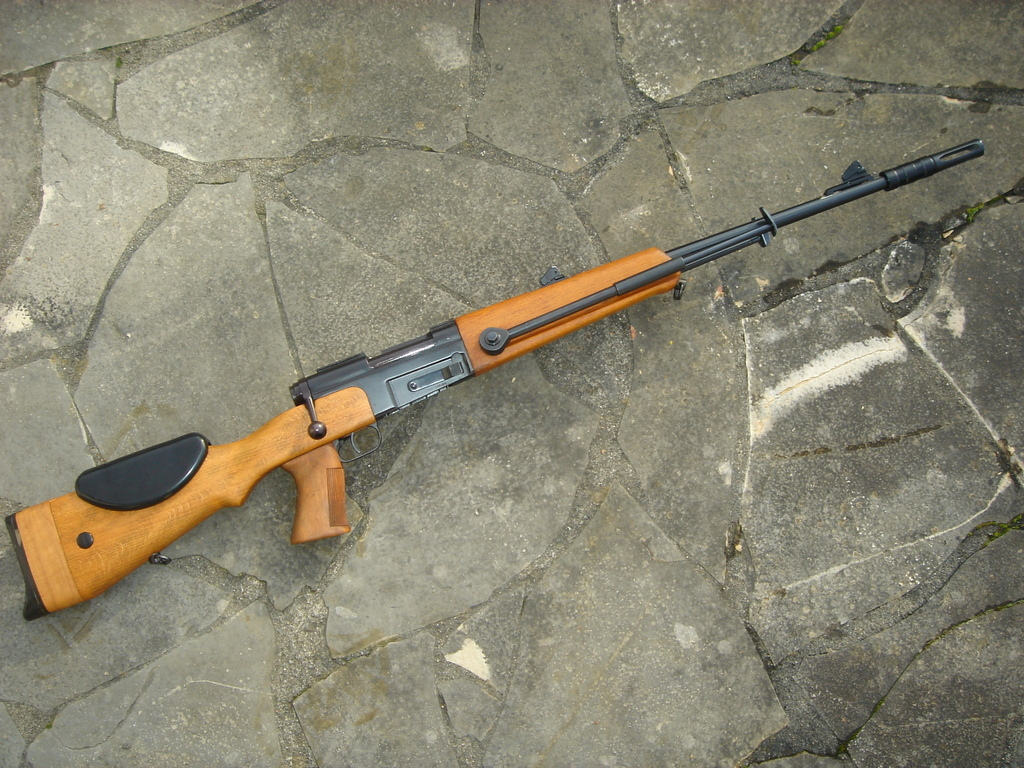
FR F1.
