= FR F2 sniper rifle =

FR F2
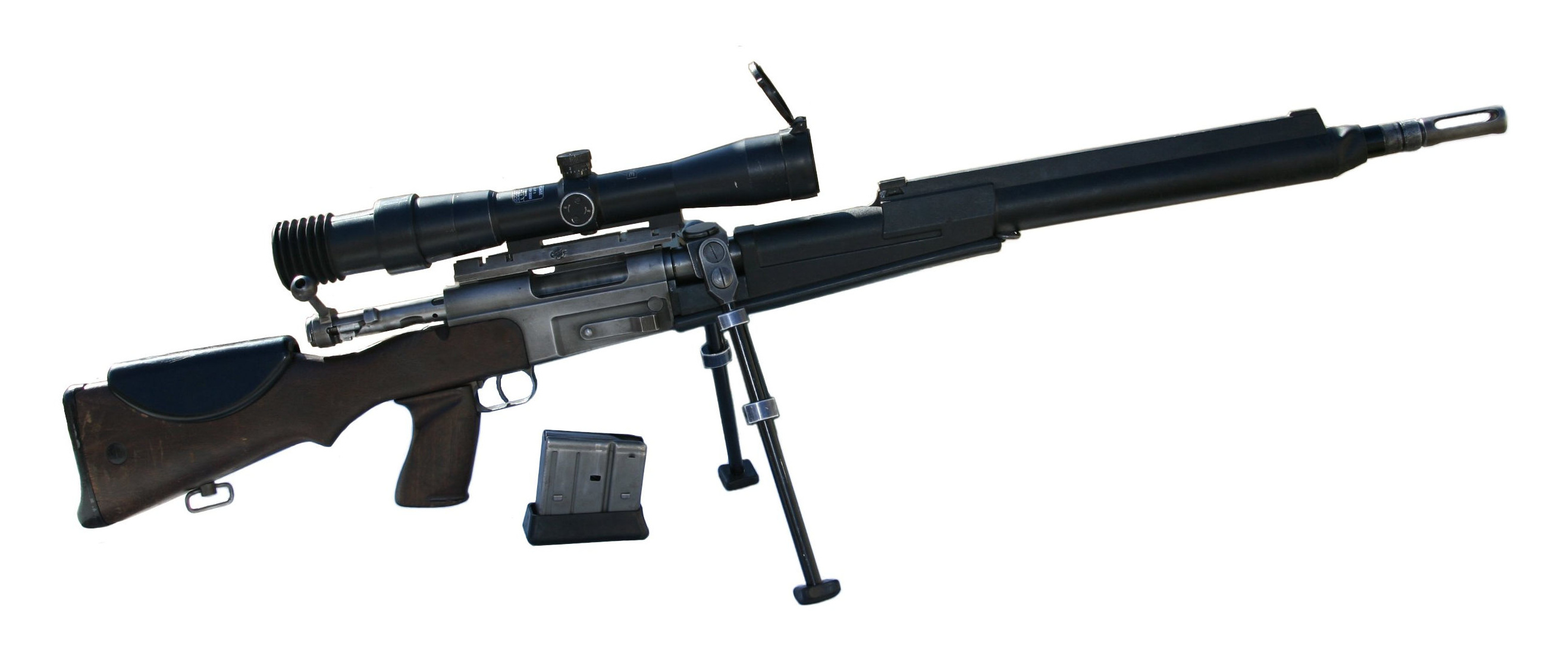
- GIAT FR F2
- Type: Sniper rifle
- Place of origin: France

Service history
- In service: 1986–present
- Used by: See Users
- Wars: Gulf War; War in Afghanistan (2001–2021); Northern Mali conflict Operation Serval; Russo-Ukrainian War

Production history
- Manufacturer: GIAT Industries
- Produced: 1984–present

Specifications
- Mass: 5.1 kilograms (11 lb)
- Length: 1,138 millimetres (44.8 in)
- Barrel length: 600 millimetres (24 in)
- Cartridge: 7.62×51mm NATO
- Action: Bolt-action
- Muzzle velocity: 820 m/s (2,690.3 ft/s)
- Effective firing range: 800 m (874.9 yd)
- Feed system: 10-round detachable box magazine
- Sights: Telescopic sight

The FR F2 (French: Fusil à Répétition modèle F2; English: Repeating Rifle, F2 model) was the standard sniper rifle of the French military from 1986 to 2019. It is designed for shooting at point targets at distances up to 800 metres.

== History ==
In August 2018, a tender was released by the French government for a replacement to the FR F2.

The FR F2 in the French Army has since been replaced by the FN SCAR and the HK 417.

== Design ==
The FR-F2 is an upgrade from the earlier FR F1 sniper rifle. The rifle barrel is thermally shielded along a considerable part of the barrel by a polymer shroud. The barrel is free floated and is equipped with a flash hider. It uses a different bipod-stock configuration from its predecessor, which is built just ahead of the receiver. GIAT studies lead to a new three groove conical barrel. Tapering the barrel from the throat area up to the first 100 mm of the barrel and at the muzzle end reduced barrel wear caused by propellant gasses passing the projectile in the bore.

The rifle's manual safety is located at the rear of the trigger.

It uses 7.62×51mm NATO ammunition and is equipped with a telescopic sight. French army standard issue is either an APX L806, with a bullet drop compensation calibrated for 7.62×51mm NATO ammunition from 100 to 800 m in 100 m increments, or SCROME J8 (Army) or Nightforce NXS (Air force) or Schmidt & Bender 6×42 mil-dot (Navy). Backup sights on top of the barrel shroud are standard on each F2 rifle.

The rifle is also issued as part of the FÉLIN infantry combat system outfitted with a SAGEM Sword Sniper 3-in-1 optic, which serves as a telescopic sight, thermal weapon sight, and laser rangefinder. The FR F2 utilizes the same basic bolt design as the older MAS-36 infantry rifle. The MAS-36 bolt action was however extensively modified and strengthened to reduce accuracy-inhibiting flex in the FR F1 and FR F2.

== Users ==
- Lithuania: Lithuanian Armed Forces.
- Ukraine

=== Former ===
- Estonia: Replaced by the Sako TRG
- France: Replaced by the FN SCAR PR and HK417 in the French military.

== Gallery ==
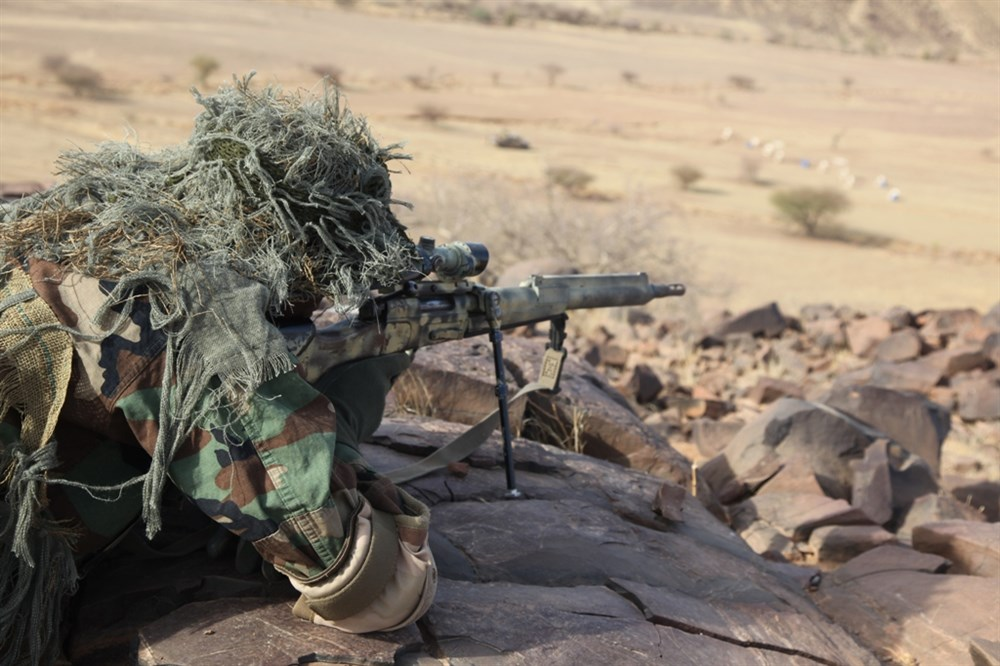
Senegalese sniper with FR F2 during Flintlock 2013.

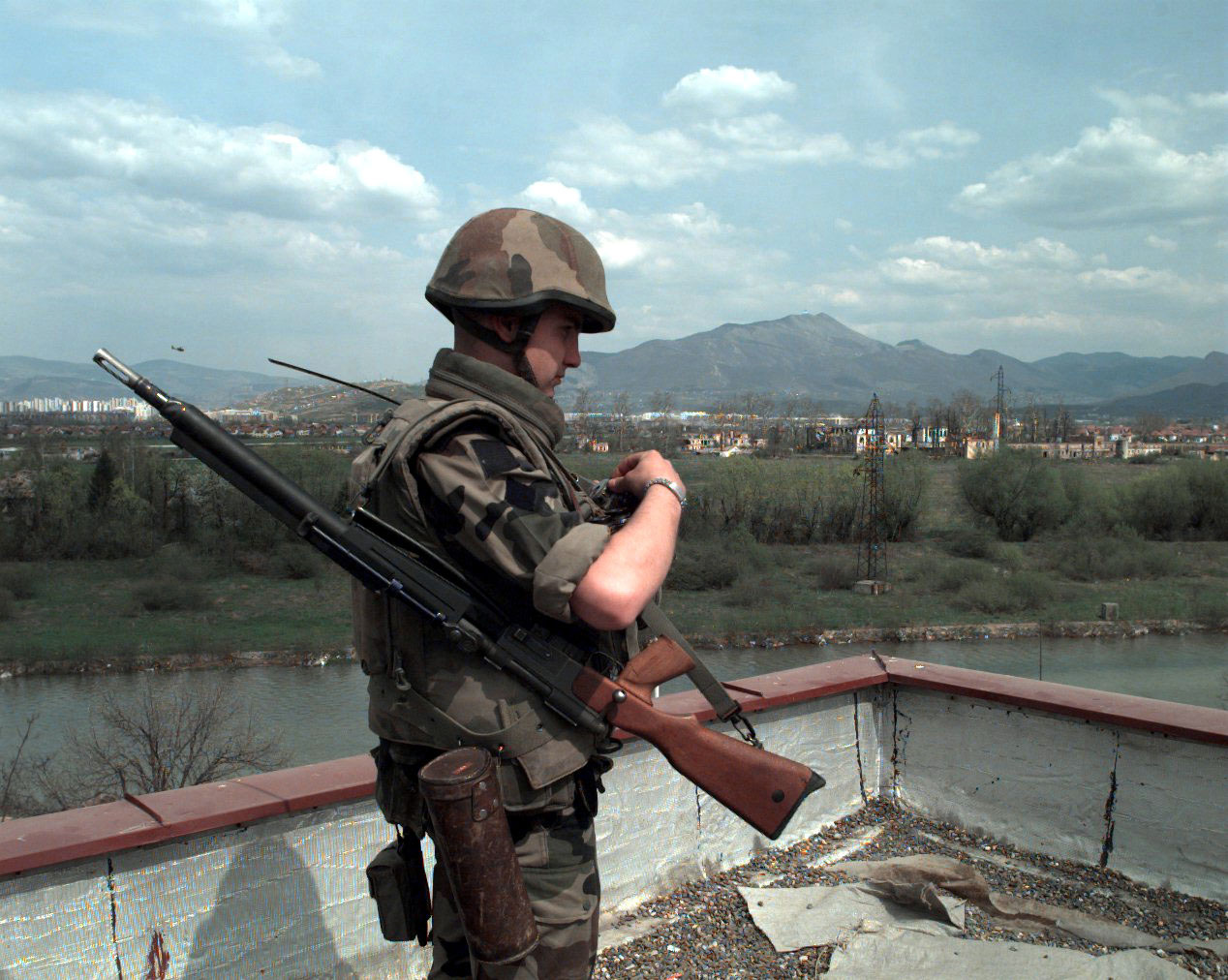
French soldier of the Rapid Reaction Corps standing guard with a FR F2.

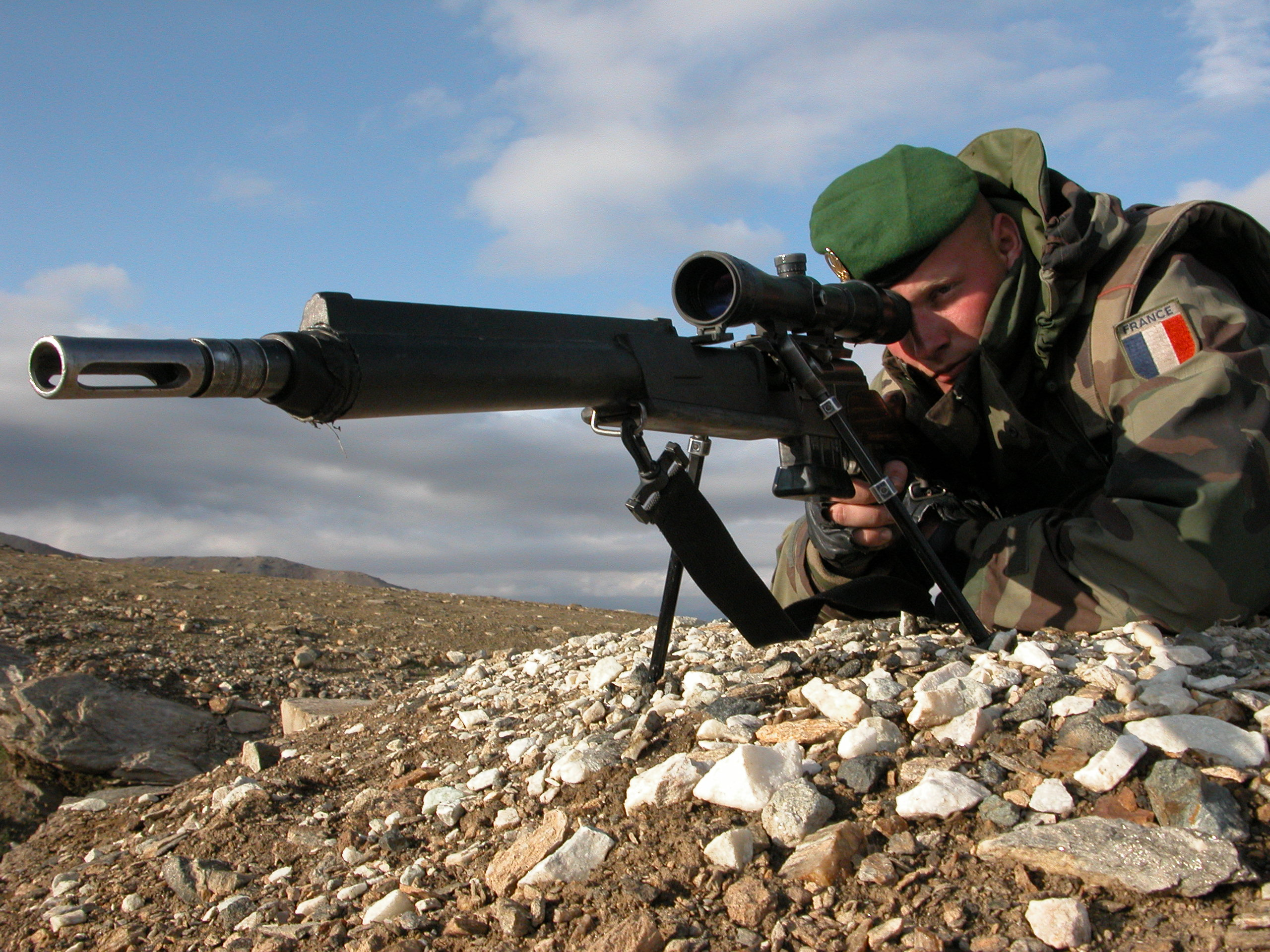
French soldier using an FR F2 in Afghanistan.

The reticle layout of a SCROME J8 telescopic sight.

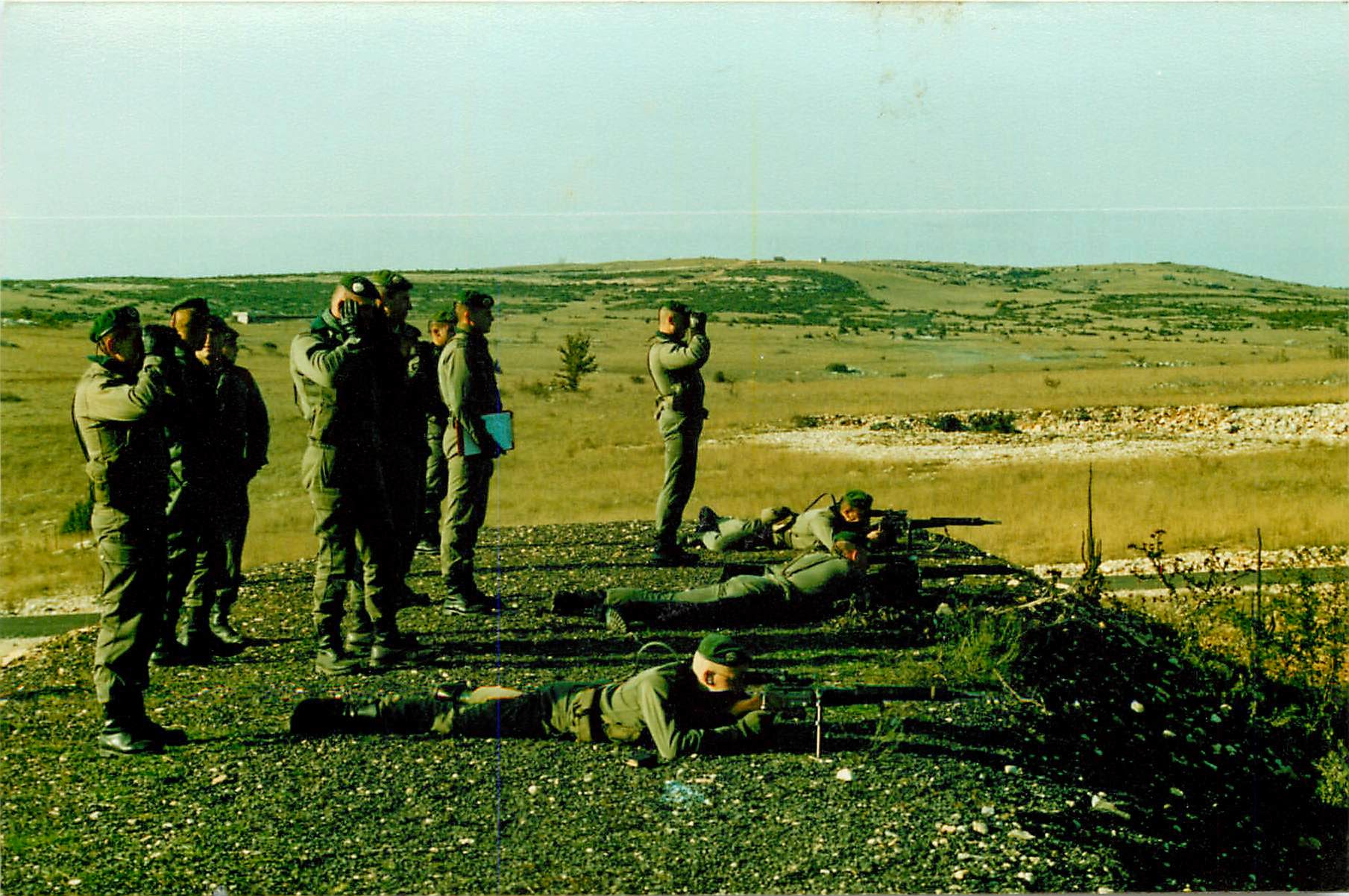
French Army on training site using FR F2

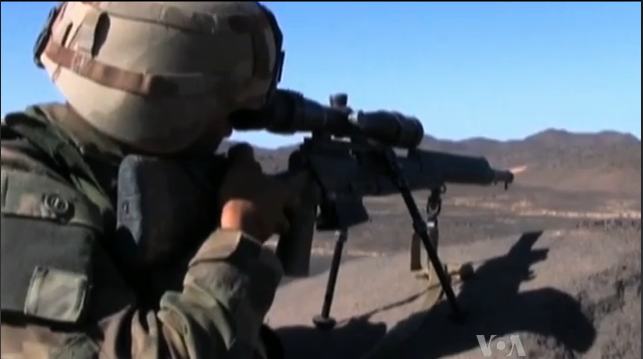
FR F2 sniper during the Battle of Ifoghas in Mali

== See also ==
- PGM Hécate II, the heavy, long-range modern French sniper rifle.
