= 7×54mm Fournier =

Rifle cartridge

7 mm Fournier
- Type: Rifle
- Place of origin: France

Production history
- Designed: 1940s
- No. built: Unknown

Specifications
- Parent case: 7.5x54mm French
- Bullet diameter: 7.25 mm
- Neck diameter: 8.16 mm
- Shoulder diameter: 11.33 mm
- Base diameter: 12.2 mm
- Rim diameter: 12.2 mm
- Case length: 53.80 mm
- Overall length: 75.87 mm

Created by the gunsmith Jean Fournier, the 7x54mm Fournier is basically the 7.5x54mm French necked down to 7 mm. The cartridge was designed to be used with the Mas Fournier hunting rifle, which was itself a modification of the MAS-36 rifle.

Since the retirement and death of Jean Fournier, the fabrication of this cartridge has stopped. However, if some original ammos are still available for sale (mainly as collector), reloading dies and tables have been released since then.
