= MAS-36 rifle =

French bolt-action rifle

MAS-36
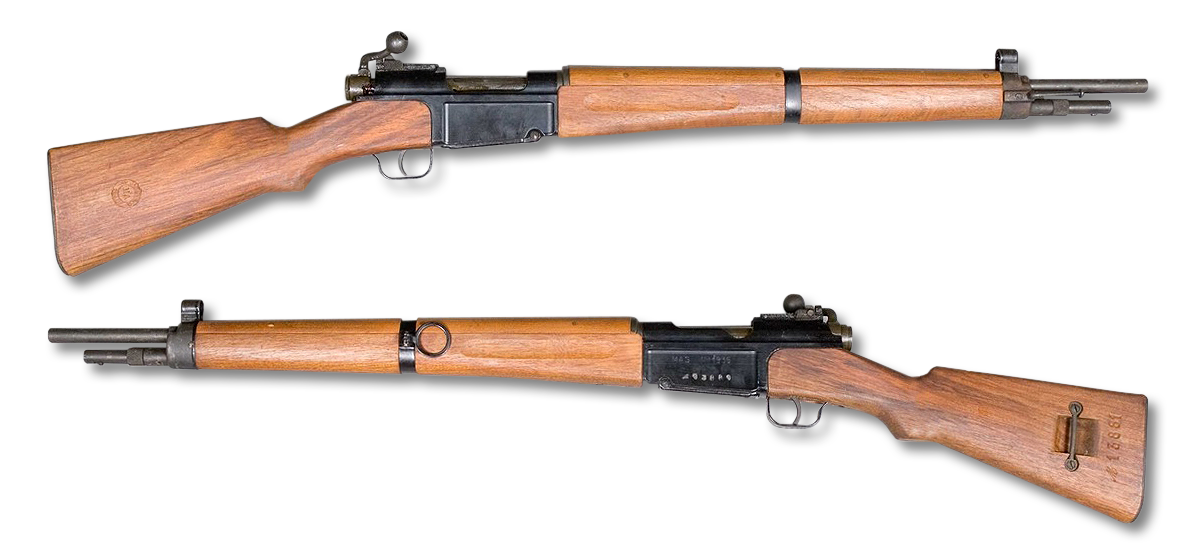
- MAS-36 rifle produced post World War II. From the Swedish Army Museum.
- Type: Bolt-action rifle
- Place of origin: French Third Republic / Vichy France / Provisional Government of the French Republic / French Fourth Republic

Service history
- In service: 1936–1967 (France); 1936–Present
- Used by: See Users
- Wars: World War II; First Indochina War; Vietnam War; Algerian War; Suez Crisis; Ifni War; 1958 Lebanon Crisis; Laotian Civil War; Chadian Civil War; Nigerian Civil War; Portuguese Colonial War; Cambodian Civil War; Western Sahara War; Lebanese Civil War; Chadian–Libyan conflict Tuareg rebellion (1990–1995); Syrian Civil War; Central African Republic Civil War (2012–present)

Production history
- Designed: 1927–1936
- Manufacturer: Manufacture d'armes de Saint-Étienne
- Produced: 1937–1952
- No. built: 1,100,000

Specifications
- Mass: 3.72 kg (8.2 lb) unloaded
- Length: 1,020 mm (40.16 in)
- Barrel length: 575 mm (22.64 in)
- Cartridge: 7.5×54mm French
- Action: Bolt action
- Muzzle velocity: 850 m/s (2,789 ft/s)
- Effective firing range: 400 m (440 yd) with iron sights
- Feed system: 5-round internal box magazine, loaded with 5-round stripper clips
- Sights: Iron sights

The MAS Modèle 36 (also known as the Fusil à répétition 7 mm 5 M. 36) is a military bolt-action rifle. First adopted in 1936 by France and intended to replace the Berthier and Lebel series of service rifles, it saw service long past the World War II period. It was manufactured from late 1937 onward by Manufacture d'Armes de Saint-Étienne (MAS), one of several government-owned arms factories in France. Only 250,000 MAS-36 rifles were available to equip the French infantry during the Battle of France in 1940. Mass production finally caught up after World War II and MAS-36 rifles became widely used in service during the First Indochina War, the Algerian War, and the Suez Crisis. Altogether, about 1.1 million MAS-36 rifles had been manufactured when production ceased in 1952.

== Description ==
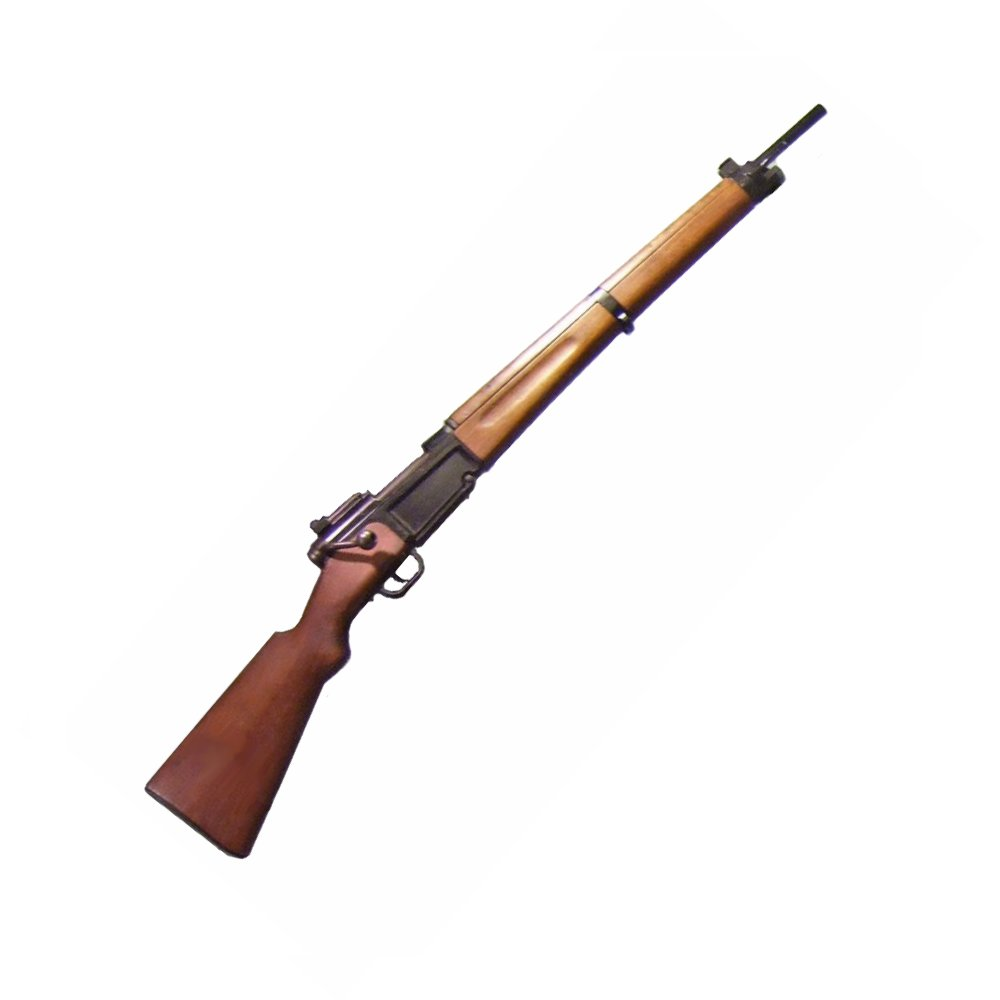
Pre World War II produced MAS-36

The MAS-36 is a short carbine-style rifle with a two-piece stock and slab-sided receiver. It is chambered for the modern rimless 7.5×54mm French cartridge; a shortened version of the 7.5×57mm MAS mod. 1924 cartridge that had been introduced in 1924 (then modified in 1929), for France's FM 24/29 light machine gun. The rifle was developed based on French experience in World War I and combines various features of other rifles like the two rear locking lugs of the British SMLE rifle (easy to clean and resistant to dirt), the dog leg shaped bolt handle of the British P14/U.S. M1917 Enfield rifle that places the bolt knob at a favorable ergonomic position in relation to the trigger and peep sight, bolt disassembly similar to the Japanese Arisaka Type 38, and the five-round box magazine (claw extractor) of the German Gewehr 98 which stored 5 rounds in a staggered column and fed by 5-round stripper clips), to produce an "ugly, roughly made, but immensely strong and reliable" service rifle.

There are just five user removable parts: a Lebel-type cruciform bayonet inserted into a guard tube under the barrel (taken out by the stopper and turned by snap-fastening the stopper in the tube to fix), the bolt body, the bolt rear cap, the firing pin and the spring of the firing pin. The metal parts of the rifle were black baked in an oven.

The MAS-36 bolt handle was bent forward in an "awkward fashion" to bring it into a convenient position for the soldier's hand. Some have since been found bent backwards into a facing-downwards position like that of many other bolt-action rifles. The MAS-36 had a relatively short barrel and was fitted with large aperture (rear) and post (front) sights designed for typical combat ranges. Typical for French rifles of the period, the MAS-36 had no manual safety.

The rifle was designed with an iron sight line consisting of a rear tangent-type aperture sight element that was calibrated for 7.5×54mm French mle1929 C ammunition for 100–1,200 m (109–1,312 yd) in 100 metres (109 yd) increments. The original front sighting element was milled and consisted of a front post that was protected by two open 'ears'. There were 25 rear aperture elements available for the sight line to optimize it horizontally and laterally in 2.32 MOA increments during assembly at the arsenal. These arsenal mounted rear aperture elements shifted to point of aim 13.5 or 27 cm (5.3 or 10.6 in) left or right or up or down at a range of 200 metres (219 yd). It is worth noting that the front stock fittings are a major component of setting the sights on a MAS-36. To discourage disassembling the front stock non-standard screws with a spanner head were used on the barrel band and nose caps. Only armorers were issued with the appropriate screw drivers to remove the front stock. If removed the front stock will probably face quite a bit of trial and error in getting the screws set back to their exact positions again.

It was normally carried with a loaded magazine and empty chamber until the soldier was engaged in combat, though the rifle's firing mechanism could be blocked by raising the bolt handle. The MAS-36 carried a 17-inch spike bayonet, reversed in a tube below the barrel. To use the bayonet, a spring plunger was pressed to release the bayonet. It was then free to be pulled out, turned around, and fitted back into its receptacle. The initial implementation of this bayonet design has a distinct (although, uncommonly encountered) disadvantage: with a bayonet stored in one rifle and the other empty, the top of the stored bayonet could be locked into the empty bayonet tube of the second rifle. This obscures the release button on the bayonet and results in permanently (at least up to destructive disassembly) mated rifles. In post-war use the French updated the bayonet storage design by drilling a hole in the bayonet, which allowed the locking catch to be depressed through an already-drilled hole in the bayonet cap. Like the Lebel model 1886 rifle, the MAS-36 featured a stacking hook offset to the right side of the barrel for standing a number of the rifles (usually a trio) upright.

== Background ==
The MAS-36 was intended as an economical, simple bolt-action rifle to serve with rear-echelon, colonial and reserve troops and meant to share machining and pave the way for a new standard semi-automatic rifle before the next big conflict. The first French semi-automatic rifle evolved from the prototype MAS-38/39. A limited number of MAS-40 semi-automatic rifles entered trial service in March 1940. The Battle of France and following German occupation of France prevented large scale introduction of semi-automatic service rifles amongst French front line troops. During the 1950s the French military adopted the semi-automatic MAS-49 rifle as their standard service rifle.

Though intended to replace the Lebel Model 1886 and Berthier rifles as well as Berthier carbines, budget constraints limited MAS-36 production and it was used with the former rifles in many French army and colonial units. During World War II, the MAS-36 was used alongside the Lebel 1886 and Berthiers during the Battle of France. After the Battle of France, the Germans took over a large number of MAS-36s, which were given the designation Gewehr 242(f) and put into service with their own garrison units based in occupied France and later the Volkssturm.

== Further development ==
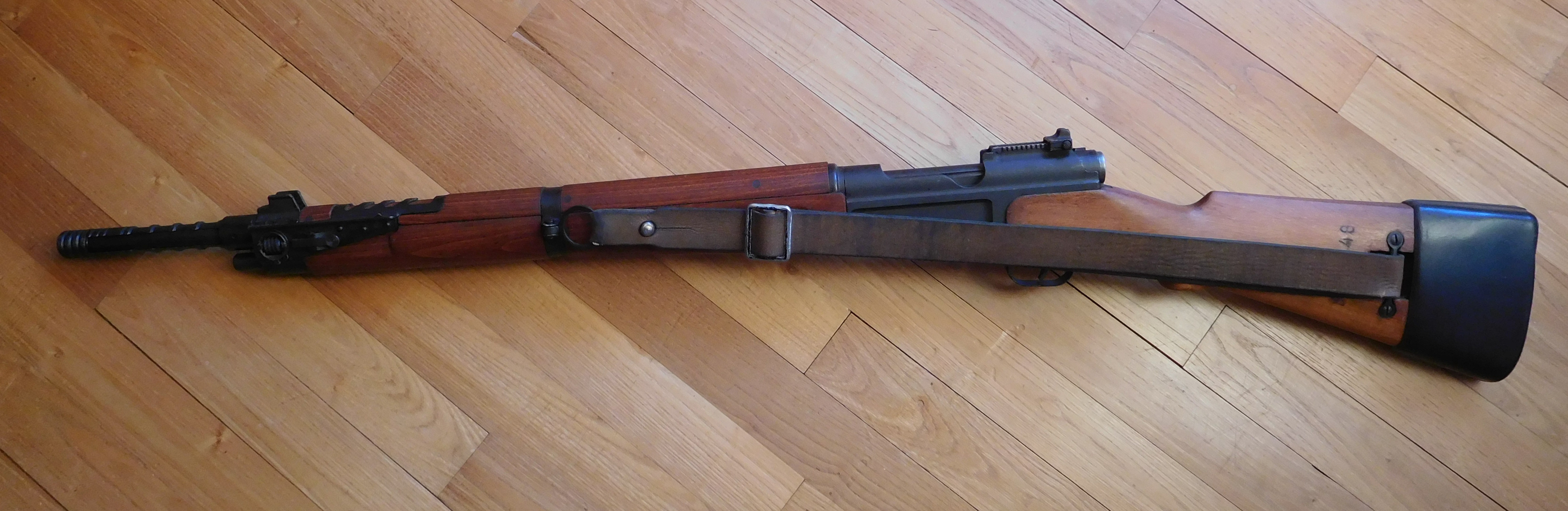
MAS 36/51 variant

Post World War II produced rifles feature production simplifications like stamped nose caps with a hooded front sight element, stamped magazine floor plates, a stamped front sling attachment featuring a ring, a protective measure to prevent dirt ingress in the trigger area and a side-mounted cam track and button to dial and lock the selected firing range on the rear sight element. The hooded front sight element reduced glare under unfavorable light conditions and added extra protection for the post. The bolt of post World War II produced rifles can not be closed on an empty chamber, indicating the rifle needs to be reloaded. Later post war batches feature phosphating/Parkerizing introduced as a more effective metal surface treatment against rust. The "second model" is the most produced version with its derivative, the MAS-36/51.

== Postwar usage ==
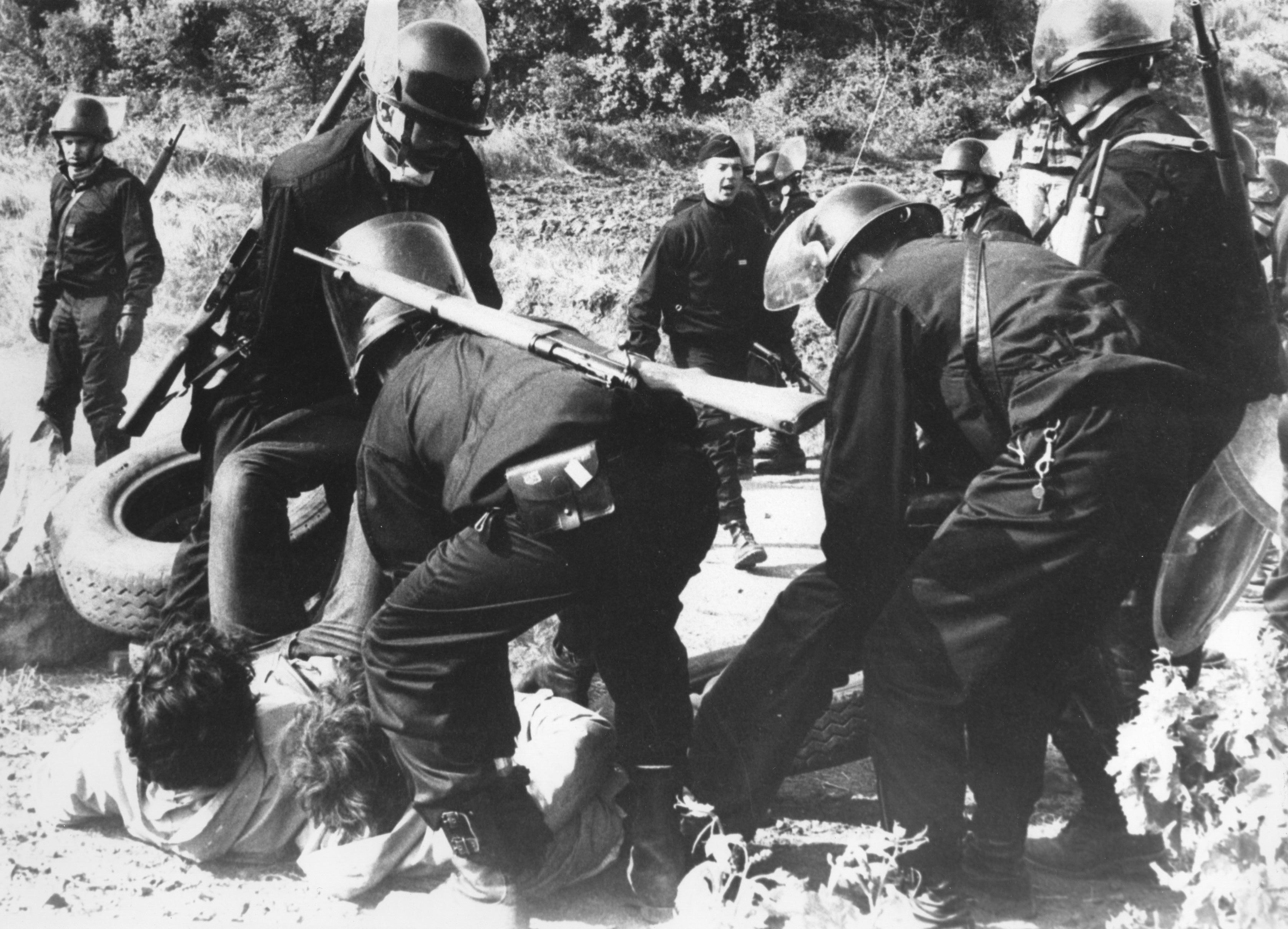
In service with the French Police Mobile Gendarmerie during the fight for the Larzac in 1978.

The MAS-36 was extensively used by French Army and colonial defense forces during France's postwar counter-insurgency operations in the First Indochina War and the Algerian War, as well as in the Suez Crisis. During the Suez Crisis, French paratroop marksmen of the 2ème RPC (Régiment de Parachutistes Coloniaux), employed telescope-sighted MAS-36 rifles to eliminate enemy snipers. The MAS-36 remained in service into the early 1960s as an infantry rifle, often serving with indigenous colonial units. It was officially a substitute-standard rifle after France adopted the semi-automatic MAS-49 rifle series in 1949, though its bolt design lives on in a dedicated sniper version of the rifle, the FR F1 (now chambered in 7.62×51mm NATO) and its successor the FR F2 sniper rifle.

The Viet Cong had utilized a modified MAS-36 that used 7.62x39mm ammunition in earlier wars.

Gabon and Côte d'Ivoire continued to use the MAS-36 post independence; In 1968 and 1969 they supplied Biafra with MAS-36 rifles during the Nigerian Civil War. Haiti presented Biafra with 300 rifles as a gift late in the conflict.

After the Second World War, civilian hunting rifle versions were made by MAS and by the gunsmith Jean Fournier. These half-stocked rifles were chambered for the 7×54mm Fournier (common, 7.5x54mm necked down to 7mm), 7×57mm Mauser (very rare), 8×60mm S (less common), and 10.75×68mm (rare). Hunting rifles in the two latter calibers had integral muzzle brakes. Also imported into the United States were a few military surplus MAS-36 rifles, converted to 7.62×51mm NATO from 7.5×54mm. These rifles were modified to chamber the NATO round and also had an SKS type trigger safety fitted to them.

In Comoros, the French had a decent amount of MAS-36 rifles in storage during WWII and the Post-war era. When Comoros became in independent nation in 1975, the rifles were given to the new Comoros Army. The MAS-36 was widely used during many of the coups and attempted coups that took place on the island nation from 1975 to 1989. After a reformation of the Comoros Army in 1990, the MAS-36 was replaced with newer firearms such as the AK-47.

In 1941, Britain and Free France occupied Syria, bringing thousands of MAS-36 rifles with them. When French forces departed from Syria in 1946, the rifles were given to the Syrian Armed Forces in order to arm their own army and militias, as the Syrian government at the time was perceived as pro-western. The MAS-36 was widely used by Syrian forces in the 1948 Arab–Israeli War. The Israeli victory and later, a coup in Syria led to Syria's loyalty shifting towards the Soviet Union instead of western countries. After purchasing large quantities of Soviet weapons in the 1950s and 1960s, the MAS-36 became obsolete with thousands of units being sent into government storage facilities. In 2011 during the Syrian Civil War, Syrian opposition forces captured thousands of the stored rifles. With nearly all of the rifles being still operational, the Free Syrian Army widely used the MAS-36 from 2011 to 2015. From 2015 onward, the Free Syrian Army decreased the use of the MAS-36 due to scarcity of the rifle's needed 7.5mm ammunition.

=== FR F1 and FR F2 sniper rifles ===
The French FR F1 and FR F2 sniper rifles utilize the same basic bolt design as the MAS-36 infantry rifle. The MAS-36 bolt action was however extensively modified and strengthened to reduce accuracy inhibiting flex in these sniper rifles.

== Variants ==
- MAS-36 CR39 — An MAS 36 equipped with an underfolding hollow aluminum stock (Crosse Repliable) designed for use by airborne forces. The rifle sling retracted on a spool in the stock when folded.
- MAS-36 LG48 — An MAS 36 equipped with a strengthened barrel and spigot-type rifle grenade launcher (Lance Grenade) used in the First Indochina War. It could launch the Rifle Grenade M1948, a modified 50mm Model 1937 mortar shell with a lengthened tailfin section designed to fit over the rifle's muzzle.
- MAS-36/51 — An MAS 36 equipped with a strengthened barrel and 22 mm NATO standard rifle grenade launcher.
- Fusil modèle FR-G2 — A highly modified MAS-36 rifle action equipped with a match barrel with harmonic compensator and telescopic sight for use by designated marksmen. It was used as a stopgap while the FR F1 rifles were being rebuilt into the FR F2.

== Users ==
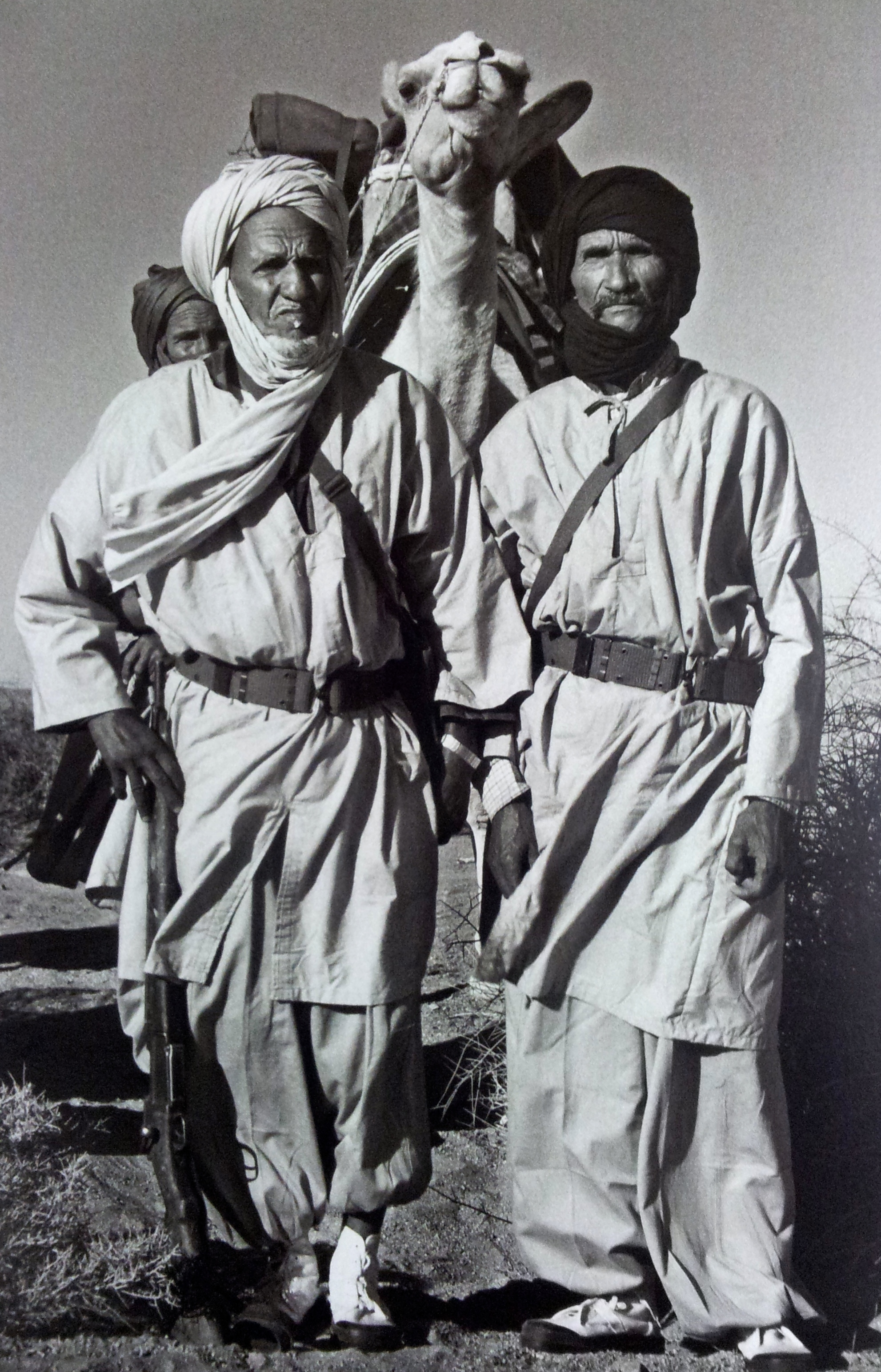
Soldiers of the Polisario Front with a MAS-36 in 1980.

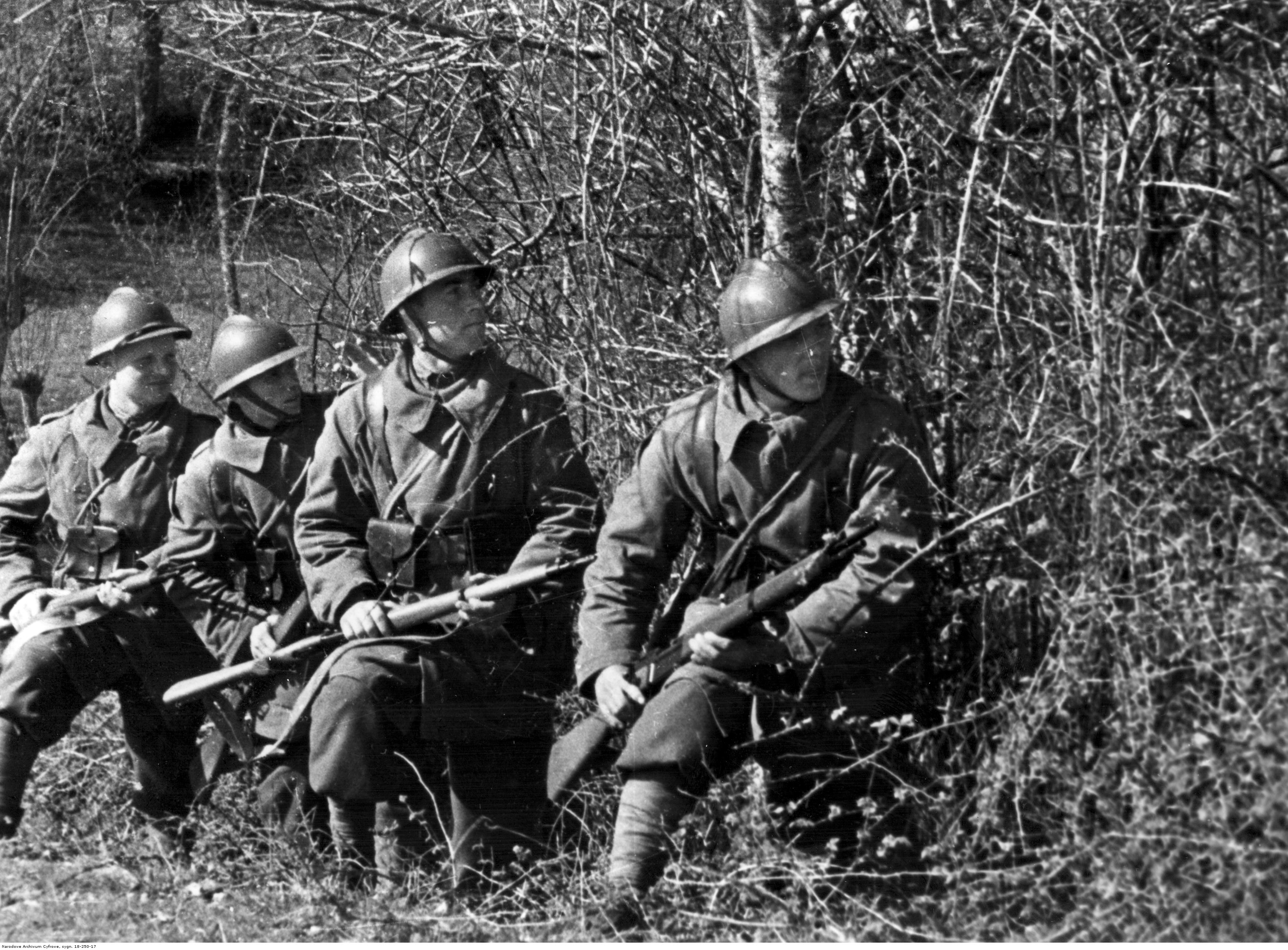
Polish soldiers with MAS 36 rifles, France, 1940.

- Algeria
- Benin
- Biafra
- Burkina Faso
- Cambodia
- Cameroon
- Central African Republic
  - Central African Armed Forces
  - Central African National Police
  - Séléka
- Chad: governmental armies (Forces Armées Tchadiennes and Forces Armées Nationales Tchadiennes) and rebels of the GUNT and FROLINAT
- Comoros
- Congo-Brazzaville
- Djibouti
- France
  - Free French Forces and French Resistance
  - Vichy Regime
  - Post-war French Army
- Gabon
- Guinea
- Guinea-Bissau
- Haiti
- Ivory Coast
- Laos: Captured during First Indochina War and Vietnam War.
- Kingdom of Laos: Received from French government during First Indochina War 1945–1954.
- Lebanon
- Madagascar
- Mali: People's Movement for the Liberation of Azawad
- Mauritania
- Monaco
  - Compagnie des Carabiniers du Prince
- Morocco: Royal Moroccan Armed Forces and Moroccan Army of Liberation
- Nazi Germany: Designated Gewehr 242(f). Issued to occupation units in France and to Volkssturm units.
- Niger
- Poland: Used by the some units of the Polish Army in France in 1940
- Sahrawi Arab Democratic Republic (Polisario Front)
- Senegal
- Syria
- Togo
- Vietnam
- South Vietnam

=== Non-state users ===
- ISIL: Used by ISIL insurgents in 2019

== See also ==
- vz. 24
- 35M rifle
- Karabiner 98k

Preceded by Fusil Lebel modèle 1886; Berthier rifle	French Army rifle 1936–1951	Succeeded by Fusil MAS-49
