= History of Mauritania (1960–1978) =

Mauritania, officially the Islamic Republic of Mauritania, was an Arab Maghreb country in West Africa. It was bordered by the Atlantic Ocean in the west, by Morocco in the north, by Algeria in the northeast, by Mali in the east and southeast, and by Senegal in the southwest. It was named after the ancient Berber Kingdom of Mauretania, which later became a province of the Roman Empire, even though the modern Mauritania covers a territory far to the south of the old Berber kingdom that had no relation with it.

== Independence and civilian rule ==
The political crisis in France that saw the birth of the French Fifth Republic in 1958 necessitated a new French constitution. Also adopted by the people of Mauritania in a referendum in September 1958, this new constitution provided for a French Community whose members would be autonomous republics. But status as an autonomous member of the French Community quickly lost its appeal as Mauritania witnessed the wave of nationalism sweeping the African continent. As soon as the Islamic Republic of Mauritania was proclaimed in October 1958, the Territorial Assembly changed its name to the Constituent Assembly and immediately initiated work to draft a national constitution; the document was unanimously adopted by the Constituent Assembly in March 1959 in place of the French constitution, and on November 28, 1960, Mauritania declared its independence.

The molding of a new political entity was a challenge in a country in which the gradual breakdown of a well-entrenched tribal hierarchy and its authority was still under way. Also, Mauritania's predominantly nomadic society did not lend itself to the establishment of administrative agencies; consequently, numerous political parties formed around those leaders who already exercised tribal authority. Most of the population, who observed democratic nomadic traditions—in which influence did not always pass directly from father to son, land was not owned by individuals, and material wealth was widely distributed rather than concentrated in a few hands—eventually accepted a centralized government.

With the advent of independence, party leaders recognized the need to consolidate to ensure the establishment of a strong and independent government that also represented Mauritania's regional and ethnic diversity. Consequently, there was a tendency on the part of some to try to put aside their differences. President Moktar Ould Daddah was able gradually to gain the support of numerous opposition parties because of his demonstrated willingness to include in his government those who previously had opposed him. Thus, even after Daddah charged the Mauritanian National Renaissance Party (Nahda) with corruption, banned the party from participation in the elections to Mauritania's first National Assembly in May 1959, declared the party illegal, and placed five of its leaders under arrest, Nahda still responded to Daddah's urgent appeal to preserve unity and independence.

In a new election, held in accordance with provisions of the new constitution in August 1961, Nahda campaigned for Daddah, who won the election with the additional support of the black party, the Mauritanian National Union. The new government formed in September 1961 included representatives of both Nahda and the Mauritanian National Union in important ministries. This electoral, then governmental, coalition was formalized in October 1961 with the consolidation of the Mauritanian Regroupment Party, Nahda, the Mauritanian National Union, and the Mauritanian Muslim Socialist Union into the Mauritanian People's Party (Parti du Peuple Mauritanienne, PPM). On December 25, 1961, the PPM was constituted as the sole legal party. Its policies included a foreign policy of nonalignment and opposition to ties with France.

In accordance with the new government's objective of acquiring support from blacks, Daddah included two blacks in his cabinet. Also, the National Assembly, headed by a black, comprised ten blacks and twenty Maures. As a final development in the emergence of a dominant single party, Daddah, the party's secretary general, further concentrated power in his hands. The PPM proclaimed Mauritania a one-party state in 1964, and the National Assembly passed a constitutional amendment in 1965 that institutionalized the PPM as the single legal party in the state. Organized opposition was henceforth restricted to channels within the party.

=== Emerging tensions ===
Tight control of political life by the PPM reinforced the highly centralized system. The imposition of single-party rule over a highly diverse population caused underlying tensions to emerge, especially among the southern black population, who feared Arab domination. Their fears were exacerbated by the 1966 decision to make the study of Hassaniya Arabic compulsory in secondary schools and the decision in 1968 to make Hassaniya Arabic, as well as French, an official language. Differences over linguistic and racial issues subsequently caused strikes and demonstrations by students and trade unionists in 1968, 1969, and 1971; all demonstrations were harshly repressed by the government, which in 1966 had banned discussion of racial problems. Other tensions existed among black Maures, who were still considered members of a slave class even though slavery had been outlawed under the French and by the Mauritanian Constitution. (See also Slavery in Mauritania.)

Political divisions within the trade union movement also erupted, causing the movement to split in 1969 into two factions, one favoring integration into the PPM and the other lobbying for an independent form of trade unionism. The PPM, ignoring the latter faction, integrated the trade unions in 1972. Their action followed a series of strikes in late 1971, including a two-month shutdown of the iron mine operated by the Mauritanian Iron Mines Company (Société Anonyme des Mines de Fer de Mauritanie, MIFERMA). Soon after the integration of the trade unions, an unofficial trade union movement was formed, and in 1973 a clandestine leftist political party, the Mauritanian Kadihine Party, was created. Another clandestine group, the Party of Mauritanian Justice, was formed in 1974 and called for more political freedom.

=== Radicalization ===
In 1969 following Morocco's official recognition of Mauritania, the government pursued a more radical political agenda to reduce its economic dependence on France. The first major step toward this aim was taken in 1972, when the government announced that it would review the agreements signed with France at independence and would sign new, more stringent agreements on cultural, technical, and economic cooperation in 1973. New agreements on military and monetary cooperation were pointedly eliminated, and Mauritania soon declared its intention of leaving the West Africa Monetary Union and its Franc Zone and introducing its own currency, the ouguiya, with the backing of Algeria and other Arab countries. In 1974, MIFERMA, which was controlled by French interests and provided 80 percent of national exports, was nationalized and the name changed to National Mining and Industrial Company (Société Nationale Industrielle et Minière, SNIM). Also in 1974, Mauritania joined the League of Arab States (Arab League). Finally, during the August 1975 congress of the PPM, Daddah presented a charter calling for an Islamic, national, centralist, and socialist democracy. The charter was so popular that both the Mauritanian Kadihine Party and the Party of Mauritanian Justice withdrew their opposition to the Daddah government.

In the early 1970s, the Daddah government made some progress toward achieving national unity and economic independence. These gains, however, were more than offset by the economic hardship caused by a Sahelian drought that lasted from 1969 to 1974. Thousands of nomads migrated to shantytowns outside the cities, increasing urban population from 8 percent of the total population to 25 percent between 1962 and 1975. But other problems forced Mauritania's leaders to shift their focus from internal to external events: the decolonization of the neighboring Western Sahara at the end of 1975; the subsequent occupation of that former Spanish territory by Morocco and Mauritania; and the liberation struggle of the indigenous people of the Western Sahara, which embroiled Mauritania in a long and costly war.

== Conflict in the Western Sahara ==
Until the late nineteenth century, the Western Sahara, a land inhabited by the nomadic Sahrawi people, had remained largely free of any central authority. But when competing European colonial powers embarked on their division of Africa, Spain claimed the Western Sahara. Spain historically had had an interest in the territory, primarily because it lay near the Spanish-owned Canary Islands. In 1884 Spain occupied the Western Sahara and remained until 1976.

For the first fifty years after the occupation, intermittent Sahrawi resistance to Spanish rule in what was then called the Spanish Sahara effectively forced the Spanish occupiers to limit their presence to several coastal enclaves. It was not until the 1950s, following the discovery of vast phosphate deposits at Bu Craa, that Sahrawi nationalism developed. For the first time, the Spanish Sahara appeared valuable to the indigenous population as well as to the governments of Morocco, Algeria, and Mauritania. The discovery of the deposits also renewed the historic rivalry between Algeria and Morocco, both of which encouraged Sahrawi aggression against the Spanish occupiers. In 1973 a number of indigenous Spanish Sahara groups formed an organization called the Polisario, the purpose of which was to secure independence from Spain.

By the mid-1970s, the government of Spain appeared willing to relinquish the territory, which was becoming more costly to administer. In addition, the sudden collapse of Portugal's empire in Africa and the ensuing liberation of Mozambique and Angola had strengthened the determination of the Polisario to shake off Spanish colonial rule, and attacks on Spanish settlements and forts had become more intense. Morocco, Mauritania, and Algeria also orchestrated international opposition in the United Nations to continued Spanish occupation. The Spanish government finally terminated its claim to the Spanish Sahara in February 1976 and bequeathed the territory—renamed the Western Sahara—jointly to Morocco and Mauritania, both of which consented to allow Spain to exploit the Bu Craa phosphates. Spain excluded Algeria from the withdrawal agreement, largely because Algeria intended to prevent Spain from exploiting the Bu Craa deposits, a decision which contributed considerably to the growing discord in an already troubled area.

=== Background to Mauritanian policy ===
==== The Moroccan factor ====
Mauritania's role in the Western Sahara conflict was heavily influenced by perceived and real threats of Moroccan expansionism. In the 1950s, Morocco advanced its concept of Greater Morocco, which included all Mauritanian territory, based on a historic (if currently moribund) allegiance to the Moroccan sultan as a political and religious leader. To make matters worse, most of the Arab League states, the Soviet Union, several progressive African states, and groups within Mauritania, as well, supported that position. For example, Mauritanian Entente leader Horma Ould Babana had claimed that a union with Morocco would protect the rights of the Maures from encroachments by the black population.

Even after Morocco finally had recognized Mauritanian independence in 1969—nine years after it had been granted by France—and had withdrawn its claim to Mauritanian territory, the Daddah government remained suspicious of Moroccan intentions. Thus, Mauritania favored using the Western Sahara as a buffer between it and Morocco, either by controlling all or part of the Western Sahara or by creating an independent state.

==== Internal factors ====
From independence until the mid-1970s, Mauritania's policy on the Western Sahara vacillated as the government sought to balance its own interests against those of a more powerful Morocco. Until 1974 the Daddah government supported self-determination for the Western Sahara, to be exercised by means of a referendum, under the assumption that the Sahrawis would choose to join with Mauritania. This assumption was reasonable: there were close ethnic ties between the Sahrawis and the Maures; a large number of Sahrawi nomads had migrated into Mauritania; and many Maures were living in the Western Sahara. During the period from 1974 to 1975, however, after Morocco had made clear its intention of occupying the Western Sahara, Mauritania pursued policies fraught with contradictions. To please the international community, on which Mauritania depended for economic aid, Daddah continued to support policy of self-determination for the Sahrawi population. But to please the dominant Maures of Mauritania, the government reintroduced the concept of Greater Mauritania, asserting the country's rights over all of the Western Sahara. A third policy, acknowledging the reality of Moroccan power, called for a partition of the Western Sahara, which led Mauritania into a long and costly guerrilla war with the Polisario.

The Mauritanian campaign to annex Tiris al Gharbiyya (the southern province of the Western Sahara) did not have much support within Mauritania. Some Mauritanians favored instead the full integration of the Western Sahara, while others, who identified themselves as Sahrawi refugees, supported independence. Adamantly opposing absorption was Mauritania's southern black population, which viewed the resultant increase in the number of Maures as a threat. To the blacks, the Western Sahara conflict was an Arab war.

==== Madrid Agreements ====
In early 1975, both Morocco and Mauritania agreed to abide by the decision of the International Court of Justice on the status of the Spanish Sahara, but when the court ruled in October 1975 that neither country was entitled to claim sovereignty over the territory, both governments chose to ignore the decision. In November 1975, they concluded the Madrid Agreements with Spain under which Morocco acquired the northern two-thirds of the territory, while Mauritania acquired the southern third. The agreement also included the proviso that Spain would retain shares in the Bu Craa mining enterprise. Mauritania acquiesced to the agreements under the assumption, probably correct, that Morocco, with its superior military power, would otherwise have absorbed the entire territory.

=== Fighting the Desert War ===
In 1976, when Mauritanian troops occupied the Western Sahara province of Tiris al Gharbiyya, as per terms of the Madrid Agreements, they were immediately challenged in fierce fighting with Polisario guerrillas. The fighting would drag on for two years, draining an already improvised economy, provoking ethnic conflict, and causing large numbers of casualties. The direct cost of Mauritania's colonial venture proved exorbitant. Mauritania rapidly increased its armed forces from only 3,000 at the beginning of 1976 to about 12,000 at the beginning of 1977; by mid-1978 the Mauritanian armed forces numbered between 15,000 and 17,000. Between 1975 and 1977, the government's expenditures increased by 64 percent, most of which was allotted for defense. This military buildup placed a heavy burden on the weak economy and diverted funds badly needed for development projects. Further alienating the population was a special defense tax, which the government levied against the entire population; despite the tax, the country was on the verge of bankruptcy by late 1977. Moreover, as the war progressed, the power of the Mauritanian military grew, contributing to internal disunity and a weak civilian government unable to solve the problems of nation building.

Having more than 6,400 kilometers of undefended borders with Mali and Algeria, Mauritania was highly vulnerable to attacks by Polisario guerrillas, who were armed and supported by Algeria. The government's inability to protect Mauritania's major towns, even Nouakchott, which was attacked in June 1976, raised fears that Moroccan troops would move into Mauritania, ostensibly to interdict the guerrillas but also as an expansionist vanguard. There was also fear of a possible plan on the part of Morocco's enemy, Algeria, to replace the Daddah government with a puppet regime.

==== Involvement of foreign countries ====
For their part, Polisario strategists sought first to remove Mauritania from the conflict and then to direct their efforts against the far stronger Moroccan forces. In mid-1977 the Polisario launched a general offensive against Mauritania to cripple its economy and incite internal opposition to the war, hoping thereby that the government either would withdraw from the conflict or would be overthrown by one more sympathetic to the Polisario cause. In May Polisario guerrillas attacked the SNIM operations at Zouîrât, killing two French technicians and capturing another six. The remaining expatriates at Zouîrât immediately left, and Mauritania promptly requested aid from Morocco. In June 1977, Morocco's military command merged with Mauritania's in the Supreme Defense Council, and 600 Moroccan troops arrived to protect Zouîrât. Following further attacks against the railroad linking the SNIM iron ore mines with the port at Nouadhibou, the Mauritanian government reversed an earlier position and requested—and received—military aid from France. In December 1977, French aircraft, in their first action, attacked Polisario guerrillas returning from raids into Mauritania.

Several wealthy Arab oil-producing states, such as Saudi Arabia, Kuwait, and Abu Dhabi, also provided Mauritania with significant aid to contain the revolutionary fervor advocated by the Polisario. Between 1976 and 1978, Saudi Arabia, in particular, provided funds amounting to twice Mauritania's annual budget.

In spite of the military aid it received, Mauritania was not able to prevent the Polisario from bombarding Nouakchott for a second time, in July 1977. The rocket attack against the capital stunned Daddah, who immediately reorganized both the army and the government, appointing for the first time a military officer to the post of minister of defense. Daddah previously had resisted bringing the military into his civilian government for fear of a military takeover.

By the end of 1977, Daddah faced growing opposition to the war and to his administration. In the military, black recruits from the south, who had joined the army because they lacked other employment opportunities and who formed a majority of the ground troops, had little interest in fighting Polisario guerrillas in the north. Moreover, black civilians resented having to pay a tax to support a war between Arabs. In addition, many Maure soldiers sympathized with the objectives of the Polisario, with whom they shared ethnic ties. Finally, anti-Moroccan nationalists within the PPM opposed the war on the grounds that it afforded Morocco opportunities to expand its influence.

==== Overthrow of the Ould Daddah regime ====
Economic hardship also weighed heavily on the Daddah regime. During 1977, defense expenditures increased as international demand for iron ore (Mauritania's major source of foreign exchange, see Mining in Mauritania) fell. Drought conditions that devastated crops and herds further strained the economy. Mauritania survived only with the help of grants and loans from Saudi Arabia, France, Morocco, and Libya.

In January 1978, during a special congress of the PPM, Daddah unsuccessfully tried to seek a path out of the Western Sahara war; however, the increasingly isolated leader proved unable to undertake any diplomatic or political initiatives. In addition, relations between Daddah and senior army officers were strained because the president constantly shifted senior officers from posting to posting to guard against a possible coup.

In February 1978, in a desperate move, Daddah appointed Colonel Mustapha Ould Salek to be Army commander. In the late 1960s, Daddah had relegated Salek, who was suspected of pro-French leanings, to the reserve corps. (Salek had reentered active duty only in 1977, when he was made commander of the Third Military Region, at Atar, and relations between Daddah and Salek were still strained.)

On July 10, 1978, the newly appointed Army commander led a group of junior officers in the bloodless overthrow of the eighteen-year-old Daddah government.
