= Ahmed Baba Miské =

Mauritanian politician, writer, and diplomat

Ahmed Baba Miske
- أحمد بابا مسكة
- Born: 18 May 1935; Chinguetti, Colonial Mauritania, French West Africa
- Died: 14 March 2016 (aged 80)
- Citizenship: Mauritanian
- Movement: Nahda (1958–1964); PPM (1964–1966); POLISARIO; PNDD-ADIL; UPR

Ahmed Baba Miské (18 May 1935 – 14 March 2016) was a Mauritanian politician, writer, diplomat and author of Lettre ouverte aux elites du Tiers-monde (Open Letters to the Elite of the Third World). He was a Mauritanian ambassador and Polisario Front member.

== Early life ==
Miské was born in Adrar Region into the Ahel Berikallah tribe, a tribe found in both Mauritania and Western Sahara. He attended primary and secondary school in Mauritania before studying at the University of Dakar and travelling to France, where he studied for some time.

== Nahda Party ==
Returning to Mauritania he became an early opponent of Moktar Ould Daddah, then a rising politician, whom Miské considered too traditional, pro-French, and generally out of touch with the rising waves of nationalism then consuming developing countries. Although a member of the Mauritanian Regroupment Party, Miské felt ignored and excluded from power. In July 1960, two months following the formation of the PRM, Miské was expelled along with several other youth leaders and Arab nationalists for their vocal opposition to and criticism of Daddah. On September 25 and 26, Miské formed the Nahda party at Kaédi, and became the party's Secretary-General.

Nahda advocated immediate independence from France and Mauritanian withdrawal from the French community, and also argued for closer relations with Morocco. The party was perceived as favoring Mauritanian White Moors over the Mauritanian Black African community, and as a result was unable to pull much support from the Mauritanian Black community. Citing allegations of corruption, Daddah banned the Nahda party on the eve of the 1959 parliamentary election. The Mauritanian Regroupment Party won every seat in the election and faced with a lack of legal means to challenge the ruling party, a number of more radical members of the party engaged in a campaign of violence, including several bombings, in May 1960. In response President Daddah arrested five leading members of Nahda, including Miské, and he was imprisoned in the remote Hodh Ech Chargui Region from May 1960 to February 1961. Following his release Miské reconciled with Daddah and Nahda took part in the Congress of Unity of October 1964, which merged several Mauritanian political parties, including Nahda and the Mauritanian Regroupment Party, into the Mauritanian People's Party, in which Miské became Secretary.

== Mauritanian People's Party and banishment ==
Although Daddah's nominal ally, Miské used his position to build up a separate power base. Fearing Miske could eventually form a threat, Daddah made Miske Mauritania's ambassador to the United States and permanent representative to the UN. Miske served in these roles from 1964 to 1966, and upon being recalled to Mauritania was arrested on corruption charges, although he was found not guilty and was released a month later. Miske then went into exile for twelve years, spending his time mostly in Paris, and founded the magazine Africasia.
