= 1951 French legislative election in Mauritania =

Elections to the French National Assembly were held in Mauritania on 17 June 1951. Mauritania had one seat in the Assembly, which was won by Sidi el-Mokhtar N'Diaye, a member of the Mauritanian Progressive Union. He defeated the incumbent, Horma Ould Babana, who had been elected as a member of the French Section of the Workers' International in the last election, but had since gone on to leave the SFIO and form his own party, the Mauritanian Entente.

== Background ==
The UPM was a conservative and regionally based organisation that had been expressly formed in order to oppose Babana's Mauritanian Entente. The party was supported by the colonial administration and its allies, the traditional Maure secular and clerical ruling classes, who feared the Mauritanian Entente's "socialist" program. Babana had spent much of his five-year term in Paris, resulting in him becoming disconnected from the changing Mauritanian political climate, and contributing to a sense of alienation from him amongst Mauritanians. This was reinforced by his strong defence of Moorish interests, which served to alienate black Mauritanians, and also by his disinterest in Mauritanian independence.

== Results ==
Candidate	Party	Votes	%
Sidi el-Mokhtar N'Diaye	Mauritanian Progressive Union	24,753	48.43
Horma Ould Babana	Mauritanian Entente	23,628	46.23
Hamat Ba	UGOVAF	2,432	4.76
Djimé Guibril Ndiaye	French Section of the Workers' International	276	0.54
Paul-Étienne Torré	Independent	14	0.03
Me Sanchez-Calzadilla	Independent	11	0.02
Roger-Henri Chipot	Democratic and Socialist Union for Peace and Freedom	0	0.00
Total		51,114	100.00
Valid votes		51,114	96.25
Invalid/blank votes		1,992	3.75
Total votes		53,106	100.00
Registered voters/turnout		135,586	39.17
Source: De Benoist
