= 1961 Mauritanian presidential election =

- August 20, 1961
- Registered: 397,588
- Turnout: 93.52%
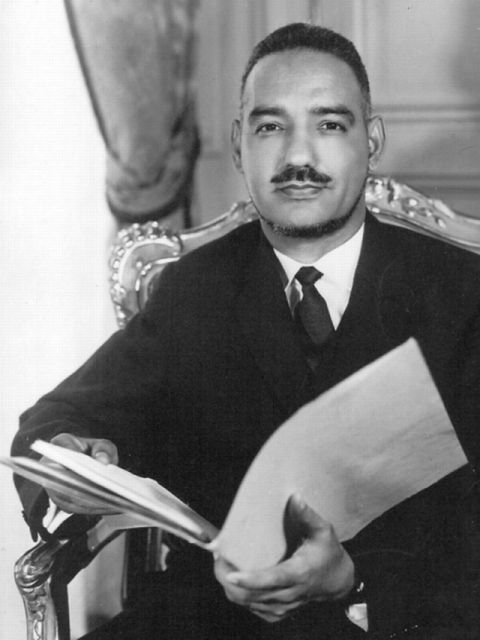
Candidate	Mokhtar Ould Daddah
Party	PRM
Popular vote	370,970
Percentage	100%

Presidential elections were held for the first time in Mauritania on 20 August 1961 to elect the president for the next five years. Moktar Ould Daddah, who had been acting head of state since independence from France in 1960 was the only candidate, and was elected unopposed. Although he was a member of the ruling Mauritanian Regroupment Party, his candidacy was also supported by the Mauritanian National Union. Voter turnout was 94%.

== Background ==
Mauritania came under the direct control of the French Colonial Empire during 1933. On 28 November 1958 a constitutional amendment allowed the creation of a transitional Legislative Council, replacing the Territorial Assembly established during the French colonial regime. The country lacked experts to frame the constitution and unanimously accepted the suggestions of a group of French jurists on 22 March 1959.

After independence on 28 November 1960 the country declared itself the Islamic Republic of Mauritania with Ould Daddah becoming the first president of the country. During the transitional period, Daddah was successful in orienting different tribal and ethnic divisions in the country. He faced pressure on some of the provinces annexed by the neighboring Morocco under Sultan Mohamed V and sought support from Arab neighbors. He also maintained relations with French government and sought the help to station its troops in Mauritania which would go on until 1966.

== Results ==
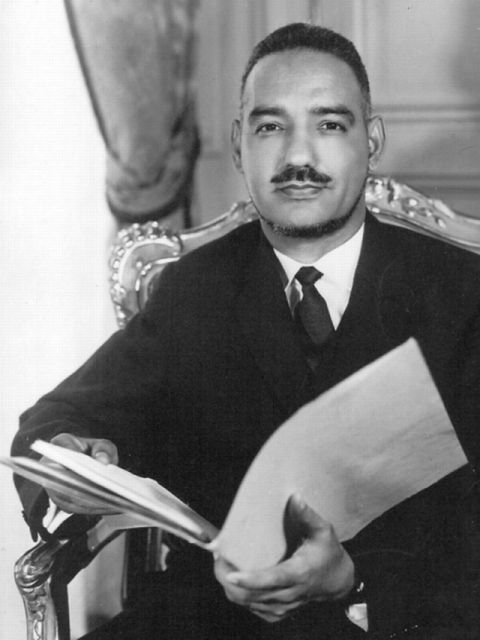
Moktar Ould Daddah, the winner of the 1961 Presidential elections

Candidate	Party	Votes	%
Moktar Ould Daddah	Mauritanian Regroupment Party	370,970	100.00
Total		370,970	100.00
Valid votes		370,970	99.77
Invalid/blank votes		838	0.23
Total votes		371,808	100.00
Registered voters/turnout		397,588	93.52
Source: Nohlen et al.

== Aftermath ==
A constitutional amendment in 1964 declared the nation a one-party state, and during 1965 all parties merged with the ruling Mauritanian Assembly Party to form the Mauritanian People's Party.
