= 1975 Mauritanian parliamentary election =

← 1971	October 26, 1975	1992 →

All 70 seats in the National Assembly 36 seats needed for a majority
- Registered: 661,416
- Turnout: 87.42% (▼8.17pp)
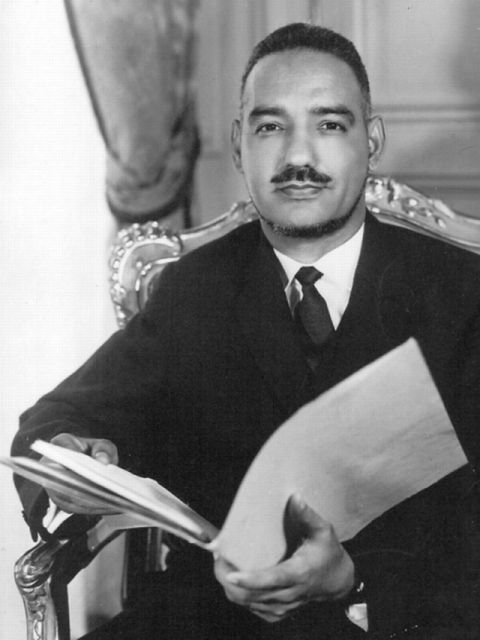
	First party
Leader	Mokhtar Ould Daddah
Party	PPM
Last election	100%, 50 seats
Seats won	70
Seat change	▲20
Popular vote	574,758
Percentage	100%

Parliamentary elections were held in Mauritania on 26 October 1975. The country was a one-party state with the Mauritanian People's Party (PPM) as the sole legal party. It therefore won all 70 seats in the National Assembly. Voter turnout was 87%.

== Results ==
Party	Votes	%	Seats	+/–
Mauritanian People's Party	574,758	100.00	70	+20
Total	574,758	100.00	70	+20
Valid votes	574,758	99.40		
Invalid/blank votes	3,443	0.60		
Total votes	578,201	100.00		
Registered voters/turnout	661,416	87.42		
Source: Nohlen et al.
