= 1959 Mauritanian parliamentary election =

Parliamentary elections were held in Mauritania on 17 May 1959. The result was a victory for the Mauritanian Regroupment Party, which was the only party to contest the elections, thereby winning all 40 seats in the National Assembly. Voter turnout was 90.3%.

The elections were the last to be held in pre-independence Mauritania, which achieved full independence on 28 November 1960.

== Background ==
The Mauritanian Progressive Union headed by Moktar Ould Daddah won 33 of the 34 seats in the Territorial Assembly elections held in March 1957. Moktar Ould Daddah was chosen as the Chairman Mauritanian Advisory Council by France's fourth republic. On 28 November 1958, a Constitutional amendment allowed the creation of a transitional Legislative Council, replacing the Territorial Assembly. The country lacked experts to frame the constitution and accepted the proposals of a group of French jurists on 22 March 1959 unanimously.

== Results ==
Party	Votes	%	Seats	+/–
Mauritanian Regroupment Party	350,126	100.00	40	+7
Total	350,126	100.00	40	+6
Valid votes	350,126	99.23		
Invalid/blank votes	2,725	0.77		
Total votes	352,851	100.00		
Registered voters/turnout	387,829	90.98		
Source: Nohlen et al.

== Aftermath ==
After independence on 28 November 1960, the country declared itself as Islamic Republic of Mauritania. Ould Daddah became the first President of the country and declared the country as a one-party state in 1964. During 1965, all parties merged with the ruling Mauritanian Assembly Party to form the Mauritanian People's Party (MPP).
