= Colonial Mauritania =

Colonial period in Mauritania

The period from the mid-nineteenth to mid-twentieth centuries is the colonial period in Mauritania.

== Early relationship with Europe ==
Before the nineteenth century, the European powers in West Africa were interested only in coastal trade; they attempted no important inland exploration and established no permanent settlements (except Saint-Louis). The European mercantile companies on the coast were charged with making the highest possible profit. Four such French companies enjoyed an official French-government monopoly of the Senegal River trade from 1659 to 1798. Contact with the Maures and the black inhabitants of the valley came about only in the course of trade. From the beginning, French influence, competing with traditional trading partners north and east of Mauritania, came through Senegal.

In 1825 the new Emir of Trarza, Muhammad al Habib, sought to reassert his sovereignty over the French-protected Oualo Kingdom to the south of the Senegal River by marrying the heiress to the kingdom. This action, which French authorities viewed as a hostile threat, combined with the emir's efforts to sell gum arabic to the British, brought a strong French reaction. Although the Maures were able to lay siege to Saint-Louis, a large French expeditionary force defeated the emir's forces. The French concluded that to secure the continuing profitability of the gum arabic trade, they would have to forcibly occupy the northern bank of the Senegal River.

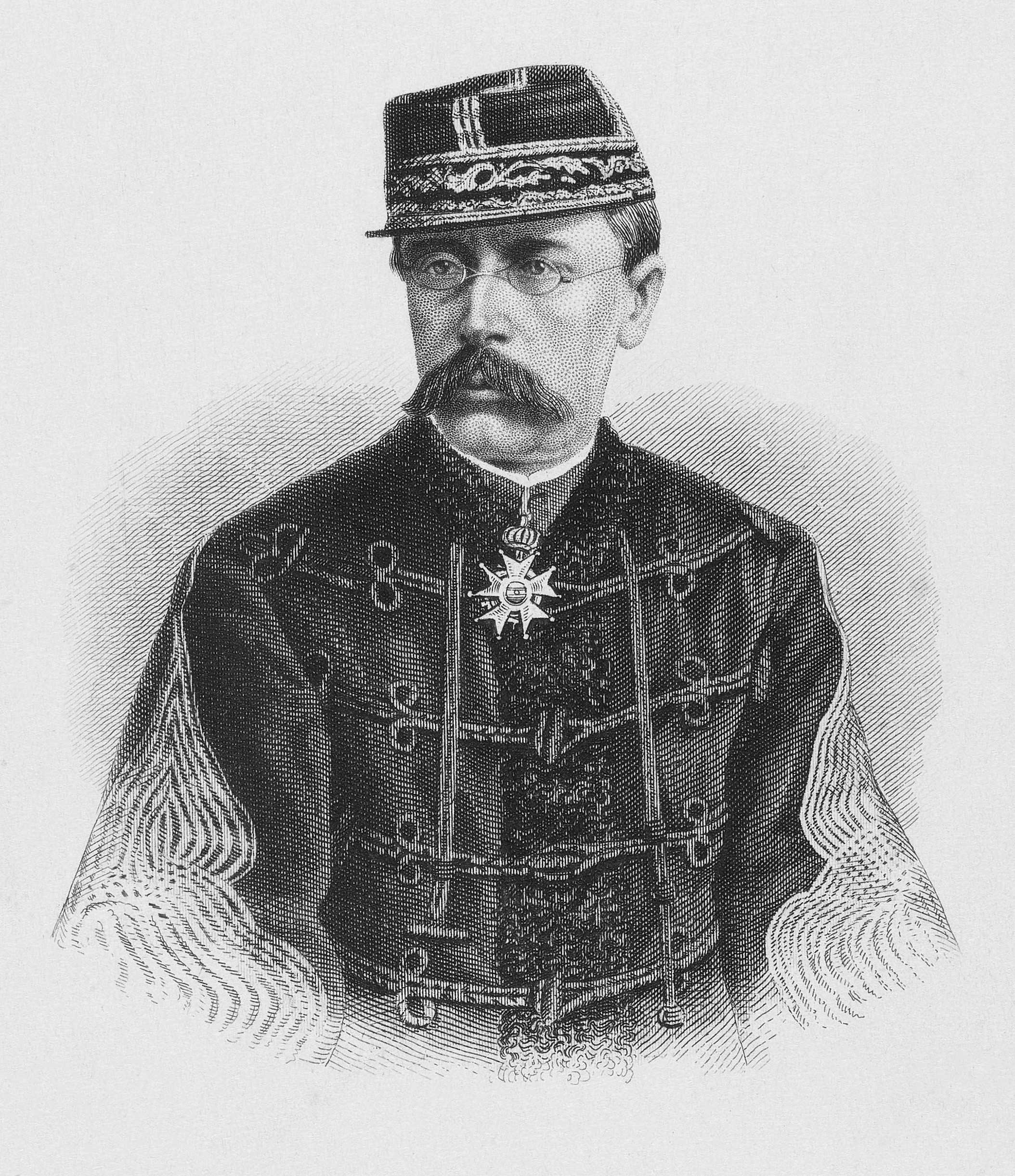
Louis Faidherbe

Implementing this new policy was Louis Faidherbe, the French governor of Senegal from 1854 to 1861 and from 1863 to 1865. In 1840 a French ordinance had established Senegal as a permanent French possession with a government whose jurisdiction extended over all settlements then effectively under French control, including those in Mauritania. By undertaking the governance of these Mauritanian settlements, French rulers directly challenged Maure claims of sovereignty. Under orders from the new government of Louis Napoleon to end the coutume, to secure the gum arabic trade, and to protect the sedentary populations of the southern bank from Maure raids, Faidherbe conquered the Oualo Kingdom. He then turned his attention to the amirates of Trarza and Brakna that had united against him. The Maures attacked Saint Louis in 1855 and almost succeeded in reclaiming the settlement, but they were repulsed and defeated a year later, north of the Senegal River. The treaties ending the war extended a French protectorate over Trarza and Brakna, replaced the coutume with a 3 percent annual rebate on the value of gum arabic delivered, and recognized French sovereignty over the northern bank of the Senegal River.

In addition to his military ventures, Faidherbe sponsored an active program to undertake geographic studies and establish political and commercial ties. In 1859 and 1860, Faidherbe sponsored five expeditions, including one that mapped the Adrar, to all areas of western and southern Mauritania.

Faidherbe's successors were content to maintain his gains and did not embark on further military ventures. French colonial policy at this time can best be characterized by the warning given by the Colonial Ministry to the governor of Senegal in the late 1870s: "Let us not hear from you." With France's virtual abandonment of Senegal, the relative calm created in the Chemama and southern Mauritania through Faidherbe's efforts came to an end. The Maures resumed their traditional practices of internecine warfare and pillaging villages in the Chemama. In virtual control of the colonial administration, the commercial companies of Saint-Louis sold arms to the Maures, while at the same time outfitting French punitive missions. Scientific expeditions into Mauritania became increasingly subject to attack, and their European leaders were killed or held for ransom. The obvious weakness of the French and their distraction with events elsewhere in the region emboldened the amirs to demand and secure the reinstatement of the coutume.

At the beginning of the twentieth century, after 250 years of French presence in Mauritania, the situation was little changed. The endemic warfare between different Maure groups may even have increased as French merchants made arms readily available, and colonial forces defended camps north of the Senegal River against Maure pillagers. Though formally under the "protection" of the French, the Maures were as fiercely independent as ever.

== Pacification ==
In 1901 the French government adopted a plan of "peaceful penetration" for the administrative organization of areas then under Maure suzerainty. The plan's author was Xavier Coppolani, a Corsican brought up in Algeria, who was sent to Mauritania as a delegate from the French government. Coppolani set up a policy not only to divide, weaken, and pacify the Maures but also to protect them. Although he served in Mauritania for only four years (1901–05), the French called Coppolani the father of the French colony of Mauritania, and the Maures knew him as the "Pacific Conqueror" of the territory.

During this period, there were three marabouts of great influence in Mauritania: Shaykh Sidiya Baba, whose authority was strongest in Trarza, Brakna, and Tagant; Shaykh Saad Bu, whose importance extended to Tagant and Senegal; and Shaykh Ma al Aynin, who exerted leadership in Adrar and the north, as well as in Spanish Sahara and southern Morocco. By enlisting the support of Shaykh Sidiya and Shaykh Saad against the depredations of the warrior clans and in favor of a Pax Gallica, Coppolani was able to exploit the fundamental conflicts in Maure society. His task was made difficult by opposition from the administration in Senegal, which saw no value in the wastelands north of the Senegal River, and by the Saint-Louis commercial companies, to whom pacification meant the end of the lucrative arms trade. Nevertheless, by 1904 Coppolani had peacefully subdued Trarza, Brakna, and Tagant and had established French military posts across the central region of southern Mauritania.

As Faidherbe had suggested fifty years earlier, the key to the pacification of Mauritania lay in the Adrar. There, Shaykh Ma al Aynin had begun a campaign to counteract the influence of his two rivals—the southern marabouts, Shaykh Sidiya and Shaykh Saad—and to stop the advance of the French. Because Shaykh Ma al Aynin enjoyed military as well as moral support from Morocco, the policy of peaceful pacification gave way to active conquest. In return for support, Shaykh Ma al Aynin recognized the Moroccan sultan's claims to sovereignty over Mauritania, which formed the basis for much of Morocco's claim to Mauritania in the late twentieth century. In May 1905, before the French column could set out for Adrar, Coppolani was killed in Tidjikdja.

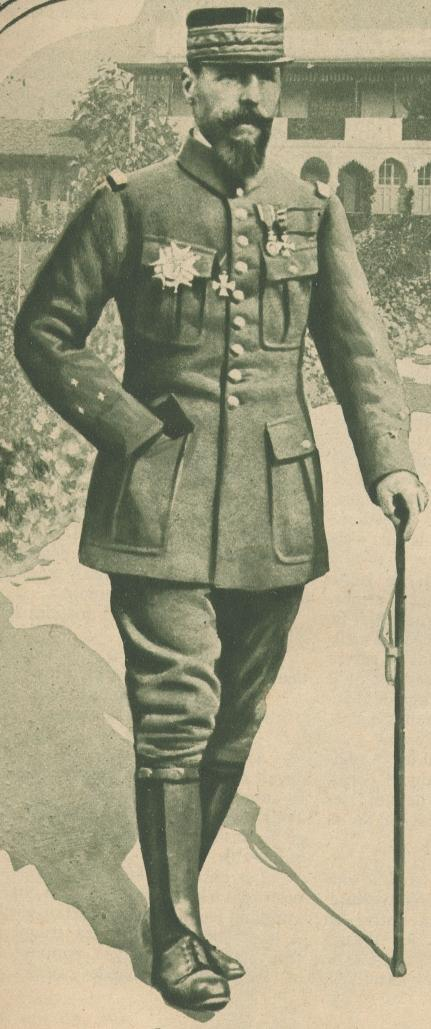
Henri Gouraud

With the death of Coppolani, the tide turned in favor of Shaykh Ma al Aynin, who was able to rally many of the Maures with promises of Moroccan help. The French government hesitated for three years while Shaykh Ma al Aynin urged a jihad to drive the French back across the Senegal. In 1908 Colonel Henri Gouraud, who had defeated a resistance movement in the French Sudan (present-day Mali), took command of French forces as the government commissioner of the new Civil Territory of Mauritania (created in 1904), captured Atar, and received the submission of all the Adrar peoples the following year. By 1912 all resistance in Adrar and southern Mauritania had been put down. As a result of the conquest of Adrar, the fighting ability of the French was established, and the ascendancy of the French-supported marabouts over the warrior clans within Maure society was assured.

The fighting took a large toll on the animal herds of the nomadic Maures, who sought to replenish their herds in the traditional manner—by raiding other camps. From 1912 to 1934, French security forces repeatedly thwarted such raids. The last raid of the particularly troublesome and far-ranging northern nomads, the Reguibat, occurred in 1934, covered a distance of 6,000 kilometers, and netted 800 head of cattle, 270 camels, and 10 slaves. Yet, except for minor raids and occasional attacks—Port-Etienne (present-day Nouadhibou) was attacked in 1924 and 1927—the Maures generally acquiesced to French authority. With pacification, the French acquired responsibility for governing the vast territory of Mauritania.

== French colonial policy ==
From the time of the French Revolution in 1789, the two main characteristics of French colonial policy in West Africa were the quest for international prestige and the cultural assimilation of indigenous populations. France's efforts to build a colonial empire may be considered a reaction to British imperial successes: colonies were a necessary burden the French took on to maintain their international stature. These efforts were always subordinate to the considerations of continental politics. As a result, little attention was paid to the political, social, and economic development of the overseas territories.

The policy of assimilation had its origins in the French Revolution when the National Convention in 1794 declared that all people living in the colonies were French citizens and enjoyed all republican rights. Under Napoleon and the Consulate (1799–1804), the law was soon repealed. In 1848, at the outset of the Second Republic, citizenship rights were again extended, and representation in the National Assembly was provided for the four communes of Senegal (Saint-Louis, Dakar, Rufisque, and Gorée). Although these rights were retained by the Senegalese, they did not apply to Mauritania or other French territories in West Africa. Elsewhere in West Africa, although assimilation was the theoretical basis of administration, a policy evolved that shared elements of British colonial practice. For example, Africans were subjects of France, not citizens, and had no political rights or rights of representation. The centralized and direct administration embodied in the doctrine of assimilation was maintained, however, and a functional collaboration between French rulers and an assimilated indigenous elite developed. Although by World War II colonial policy was still labeled assimilationist, only a very few Africans were assimilated. For the majority of Africans, the realities of French colonial policy were far from the spirit of French egalitarianism.

In Mauretania and the other French territories of the Sahara, the French colonial authorities did not enforce their anti-slavery laws, but tolerated the indigenous slave trade until the end of French colonial rule.

== French administration through World War II ==
Mauritania, a long-time appendage of Senegal, was not considered worth the expense necessary to pacify and develop it until Coppolani succeeded in changing the attitude of the French government. In 1904 France recognized Mauritania as an entity separate from Senegal and organized it as a French protectorate under a delegate general in Saint-Louis. With the success of the first pacification attempts, the status of Mauritania was upgraded to that of a civil territory administered by a commissioner of government (first Coppolani, later Gouraud). Although formally separate from French West Africa (Afrique Occidentale Française—AOF), which had been created in 1895, Mauritania was closely tied to its administrative structure and had its annual budget appended to that of the AOF. On December 4, 1920, by a decree of the Colonial Ministry in Paris, Mauritania was officially included in the AOF with the six other French West African territories—Senegal, the French Sudan, Guinea, Côte d'Ivoire, Dahomey (present-day Benin), and Niger.

The AOF was organized pyramidally under a centralized federal structure in Dakar. Directly appointed by the president of the French Republic, the governor general of the AOF came to have a great deal of power because of the instability and short duration of Third Republic governments in Paris. The governor general was the head of centralized administrative bureaucracy consisting of a lieutenant governor for each territory, the commandant of a cercle (a colonial administrative subdivision), and chiefs of subdivisions, cantons, and villages. The key figure in the system was the commandant in each cercle, who was almost always a European and who was closest to the indigenous population in his duties of collecting taxes, overseeing works projects, maintaining peace and security, and carrying out administrative decrees. Generally, the subdivisions subordinate to the commandant were manned by Africans. For these positions, the French relied to a great extent on the traditional hierarchy of chiefs or their sons. In keeping with their policy of direct, centralized rule, the French made it clear that these African chiefs exercised authority not by virtue of their traditional position but by virtue of their status as modern colonial administrators.

Before 1946 no legislative bodies existed in the AOF. The governor general was assisted by the Grand Council in Dakar, Senegal, which since 1925 had represented the federation's major interest groups (military personnel, civil servants, and businessmen). But the council had only consultative status, and its members were all appointed by the governor general. Similar administrative councils advised the lieutenant governors in all of the territories except Mauritania and Niger.

Mauritania's administrative structure conformed generally with that of the rest of the AOF territories. There were, however, some very important differences. Unlike the other territories (with the possible exception of Niger), most of the cercles still had military commandants because of the late date of the territory's pacification. The resultant conflicts between military and civilian authorities caused frequent administrative changes and reorganizations, including shifts in boundaries that tended to create confusion.

The importance of the role of the traditional Maure chiefs in the administration was the most significant difference between Mauritania and the other AOF territories and has probably had the greatest continuing impact. The extent to which administrative practice in Mauritania contradicted the French policy of direct rule and resembled British indirect rule is noteworthy. From the time of Coppolani, the administration had relied heavily on the marabouts for support and administration. In recognition of the support given by Shaykh Sidiya of Trarza, the French placed the school of Islamic studies at Boutilimit under his control. Traditional administrators of Islamic justice, the qadis, were put on the French payroll without supervision, and administrative appointments of chiefs were subject to the approval of the traditional jamaa.

In an effort to maintain order throughout the turbulent territory, the French co-opted the leaders of certain warrior groups to serve the administration. Notable among these were the amirs of Trarza, Brakna, and Adrar, the three most powerful men in the colony, who were aided by 50 heads of smaller groups and the more than 800 chiefs of factions and sub-factions. Although there was extensive French interference in the operations of the traditional authorities, the traditional social structure of Mauritania was maintained and thrust into the modern world.

With the outbreak of World War II in 1939, France's African territories were called upon to supply troops and provisions for the war effort. After France fell in 1940, the Vichy government gained control of the AOF and replaced the official policy of assimilation with a policy of racial discrimination in shops, trains, and hotels. Existing democratic institutions were repressed, and the administrative councils were abolished. Elements of French colonial policy, such as the indigénat and forced labor, were abused. The chiefs, on whom the Vichy government in Dakar relied, were increasingly seen as collaborators by their people as war-related demands for agricultural production and forced labor besieged them. Sporadic resistance to these abuses was met with summary punishment.

In recognition of the suffering of the people of the AOF territories during the war and of the AOF's contribution to the war effort of the Free French (at one time more than half the Free French forces were Africans), Free French officials convened a conference in Brazzaville, Congo, in June 1944 to propose postwar reforms of the colonial administration. The conference favored greater administrative freedom in each colony, combined with the maintenance of unity through a federal constitution. It also recommended the abolition of the indigénat and forced labor, the establishment of trade unions, the rapid extension of education, and the granting of universal suffrage. The conference was firmly opposed, however, to any concept of evolution outside the French bloc and called for the full application of the assimilationist doctrine. The Brazzaville Conference was the beginning of great political and social change that was to sweep Mauritania and other French African States to independence in less than seventeen years.

== Postwar reforms ==
Only slightly developed and long neglected, Mauritania played no role in the rising nationalism in the AOF after World War II. The 1946 constitution of the French Fourth Republic established the former colonies of the AOF as overseas territories of France integrally tied to the French Union. The French administration in Saint-Louis retained jurisdiction in criminal law, public freedoms, and political and administrative organization; the Colonial Ministry could still rule by decree, if the decree did not violate a statute. The indigénat and forced labor were abolished, and French citizenship was extended to all inhabitants of French territories willing to renounce their local legal status.

Elective representation existed on three levels: territorial, federation (AOF), and national (French). A General Council (renamed Territorial Assembly in 1952) was established in each territory with extensive controls over the budget, but with only consultative powers over all other issues. The Mauritanian General Council comprised twenty-four members, eight elected by Europeans and sixteen elected by Mauritanians. Each territory had five representatives, elected from its General Council, on the AOF's Grand Council in Dakar, Senegal, which had general authority over budgeting, politics, administration, planning, and other matters for all of the AOF. Each territory also sent representatives to the National Assembly, the Council of the Republic, and the Assembly of the French Union in Paris.

The franchise created by the 1946 French constitution was small and restricted to government officials, wage earners, veterans, owners of registered property, and members or former members of local associations, cooperatives, or trade unions. Consequently, in the Mauritanian elections of 1946, there were fewer than 10,000 qualified voters. In 1947 individuals literate in French and Arabic were added to the electorate, and in 1951 heads of households and mothers of two children were made eligible. By 1956 suffrage had become universal.

Before 1946 the territory of Mauritania formed one electoral unit with Senegal, which was represented by a single senator in the French Senate. The 1946 constitution, however, separated Mauritania from Senegal politically, giving it a deputy to the French National Assembly. At the same time, the bicameral General Council, which was reorganized into the unicameral Territorial Assembly in 1952, was established in Mauritania. Nonetheless, political activity in Mauritania was minimal. The territory's first party, the Mauritanian Entente, was headed by Horma Ould Babana, who served as the first Mauritanian deputy to the French National Assembly.

The Mauritanian Entente was founded in 1946 under the auspices of Leopold Senghor and Lamine Gueye of the Senegalese section of the French Socialist Party. Formed specifically for the 1946 election, the Mauritanian Entente was neither well organized nor mass based. Yet on a platform calling for movement toward independence and elimination of chiefdoms, Babana easily defeated the candidate of the conservative French administration and the leading clerics. The new deputy, however, spent most of his five-year term in Paris, out of contact with politics in Mauritania. As a result, on his return for the 1951 elections, Babana was defeated by the Mauritanian Progressive Union, led by Sidi el Moktar N'Diaye and supported by the colonial administration and its allies, the traditional Maure secular and clerical ruling classes, who feared the Mauritanian Entente's "socialist" program. In the 1952 election for members of the Territorial Assembly, the Mauritanian Progressive Union won the twenty-two of the twenty-four seats.

The reforms of 1956, or Loi-Cadre, were even more sweeping than those of 1946. In the face of growing nationalism and the development of a political consciousness in the AOF, the Loi-Cadre ended the integrationist phase of French colonial policy and bestowed a considerable degree of internal autonomy on the overseas territories. Universal suffrage and the elimination of the dual college electoral system led to the creation of district and local representative councils and a great enlargement of the powers of the territorial assemblies. Each territory could now formulate its own domestic policies, although the territories continued to rely on France for decisions concerning foreign affairs, defense, higher education, and economic aid.

The most important provision of the 1956 Loi-Cadre was the establishment of a council of government to assume the major executive functions of each territory that until that time had been carried out by a Paris-appointed colonial official. The councils were composed of three to six ministers elected by the territorial assemblies on the advice of the dominant party. Each minister was charged with overseeing a functional department of government. The head of the ministers became vice president of the council and, in effect, if not in title, prime minister. In Mauritania, that person was Moktar Ould Daddah, the country's only lawyer and a member of a prominent pro-French clerical family.

== Road to independence and the quest for national unity ==
Mauritania's first government was invested in May 1957 and symbolically chose as its new capital Nouakchott, which by design was situated almost exactly between the Senegal River Valley, populated primarily by black farmers, and the Maure stronghold in Adrar. The choice represented a compromise between these two competing areas. It also set the tone for Daddah's approach to Mauritania's political conflicts: compromise and conciliation for the sake of national unity.

The greatest challenge to national unity was Mauritania's heterogeneous population. As in all the Sahelian states, Mauritania's southern regions were inhabited mainly by peasants who belonged racially and culturally to black Africa, while the population of its northern regions were desert nomads who identified with the Arab world. At independence, Mauritania's estimated 1.5 to 1.8 million people could be divided into three groups: one-third of the inhabitants were both racially and ethnically Maures; another third, although racially black or mixed Maure-black, were ethnically Maures (this group of black Maures was essentially a slave class until 1980, when slavery was abolished); and the remaining third were racially and ethnically black, resembling in many respects the populations in neighboring Senegal and Mali.

Achievement of national unity was impeded by the desires of some Maures, mostly from the northern sections of the country, to reunite with Morocco, and the countervailing wishes of many blacks to secede from Mauritania and join the Mali Federation. The defeat of the Mauritanian Entente and Babana by the Mauritanian Progressive Union in the elections of 1951 and 1956, which established the Mauritanian Progressive Union's dominance, led Babana and several of his followers in the summer of 1956 to flee to Morocco, where Babana became head of the National Council of Mauritanian Resistance. With the support of many Maures inside Mauritania, this group supported Morocco's claims to Mauritania and, by extension, Morocco's opposition to Mauritanian independence.

To counterbalance the pro-Moroccan sympathies of many Maures, southern minority groups formed a regional party, the Gorgol Democratic Bloc, committed to the prevention of a Maghribi union and to the maintenance of close ties with black African countries. Intellectuals from various black minorities met in Dakar, Senegal, in 1957 and created the Union of the Inhabitants of the River Valley to fight for minority rights against Maure domination.

Further impeding national unity was the inclusion of French officials in the key ministries of finance and economic planning. Daddah was educated in France and, having just returned to Mauritania to form the government, had not been involved in the rivalries and struggle for power. His consequent congeniality toward the French alienated the Association of Mauritanian Youth, an important group advocated total independence and strict anticolonialism.

In this atmosphere of increasing fragmentation and political instability, Daddah, with the strong support of France, called for unity among all factions. At the Congress of Aleg in May 1958, the Mauritanian Regroupment Party was formed in a merger of the Mauritanian Progressive Union, elements of the Mauritanian Entente that had expelled Babana, and the Gorgol Democratic Bloc. This party was headed by Daddah as secretary-general and Sidi El Moktar as president. Its platform called for Mauritania to join the French Community (francophone Africa) and to reject both Morocco's claim to Mauritania and a 1957 French proposal to unite Mauritania with francophone Saharan states in the joint French dominated Common Saharan States Organization. The platform also proposed the systematic organization within the country of local party committees to involve all sectors of the population in the party. The party's program reflected the three main themes of Mauritanian unity: the rejection of federation with Mali or Morocco under any terms, the principle of balance between Maures and blacks within the party and government, and the preeminence of Daddah as the only person capable of holding the country together.

The Mauritanian Regroupment Party represented a union of modern and traditional elements as well as a balance between north and south. The dominance of traditional elements favoring close ties with France led, however, to the end of unity. Progressive youth leaders, excluded from decision making at the party congress convened at Nouakchott in July 1958, defected and formed a new opposition party, the Mauritanian National Renaissance Party (Nahda) with Ahmed Baba Miské as secretary-general. The Nahda platform called for total and immediate independence from France and a rapprochement with Morocco. Although the program was designed to rally diverse opposition to the traditional Mauritanian Regroupment Party, the call for rapprochement with Morocco caused Nahda's opponents to label it a Maure party, which cost it the support of the black minorities. But former Mauritanian Entente members, including Babana, supported Nahda. Its anticolonial nationalist platform also attracted many young Maures.

== See also ==
- List of colonial governors of Mauritania
- Saad Buh
