= Mauritanian National Renaissance Party =

- Secretary-General: Ahmed Baba Miské
- Founded: 25 September 1958
- Dissolved: 4 October 1961
- Split from: Mauritanian Regroupment Party
- Succeeded by: Mauritanian People's Party
- Headquarters: Nouakchott, Mauritania
- Ideology: Arab nationalism

Mauritanian National Renaissance Party (French: Parti de la Renaissance Nationale, Arabic: حزب النهضة الوطنية الموريتانية an-Nahda al-Wataniyya al-Mauritaniya (Nahda)) was an Arab nationalist political party in Mauritania from 1958 to 1961. It was led by Ahmed Baba Miské.

== Foundation ==
In July 1958, two months after the Aleg Conference which founded the party, the Mauritanian Regroupment Party expelled Ahmed Baba Miské and other youth leaders from the party because of their vocal opposition to Mokhtar Ould Daddah. meeting at Kaedi, where the party was formed on 25 September 1958.

== Ideology ==
Unlike the cautious conservatism espoused by the PRM, Nahda was more radical, and wanted immediate and total independence from France, and closer relations with Morocco. The demand for a closer relationship with Morocco was interpreted by some as support for the concept of Greater Morocco espoused by Allal al-Fassi, which would either be on the basis of a federation or a unitary state.

Initially intended to unite the opposition to Daddah and the PRM, the Arab nationalist nature of Nahda worried many Mauritanians, especially Black African in Southern Mauritanian, who saw Arab nationalism as synonymous with Moorish domination. Nahda was able to attract a lot of support, including from Mauritanian businesses, and also financial support from Morocco.

== Decline ==
Factional infighting within Nahda and accusations of corruption exacerbated Nahda's decline, as it gave the PRM a pretext for banning all opposition activity, which it did so on the eve of the 1959 election. The PRM won every seat, and Nahda was left with no political or legal avenues to express opposition to the government. More radical members of the party, which was by now heavily fragmented, mounted a campaign of violence and civil unrest in Atar and Nouakchott in May 1960, including several bombings. In response President Daddah placed five Nahda leaders, including Miske, in detention in the remote Hodh Ech Chargui Region. They were held there until February 1961, three months after independence.

== Post-independence rapprochement ==
Following Mauritanian independence, party leaders recognized the need to consolidate to ensure the establishment of a strong and independent government that also represented Mauritania's regional and ethnic diversity. Consequently, there was a tendency on the part of some to try to put aside their differences. President Moktar Ould Daddah was able gradually to gain the support of numerous opposition parties because of his demonstrated willingness to include in his government those who previously had opposed him. Thus, even after Daddah charged the Mauritanian National Renaissance Party (Nahda) with corruption, banned the party from participation in the elections to Mauritania's first National Assembly in May 1959, declared the party illegal, and placed five of its leaders under arrest, Nahda still responded to Daddah's urgent appeal to preserve unity and independence.

In a new election, held in accordance with provisions of the new constitution in August 1961, Nahda campaigned for Daddah, who won the election with the additional support of the black party, the Mauritanian National Union. The new government formed in September 1961 included representatives of both Nahda and the Mauritanian National Union in important ministries. This electoral, then governmental, coalition was formalized in October 1961 with the consolidation of the Mauritanian Regroupment Party, Nahda, the Mauritanian National Union, and the Mauritanian Muslim Socialist Union into the Mauritanian People's Party (Parti du Peuple Mauritanienne, PPM). On December 25, 1961, the PPM was constituted as the sole legal party. Its policies included a foreign policy of nonalignment and opposition to ties with France.
