= List of ambassadors of Mauritania to the United States =

Coordinates: 38.915439°N 77.047744°W

Ambassador of Mauritania to the United States Embassy of Mauritania in Washington, D.C.
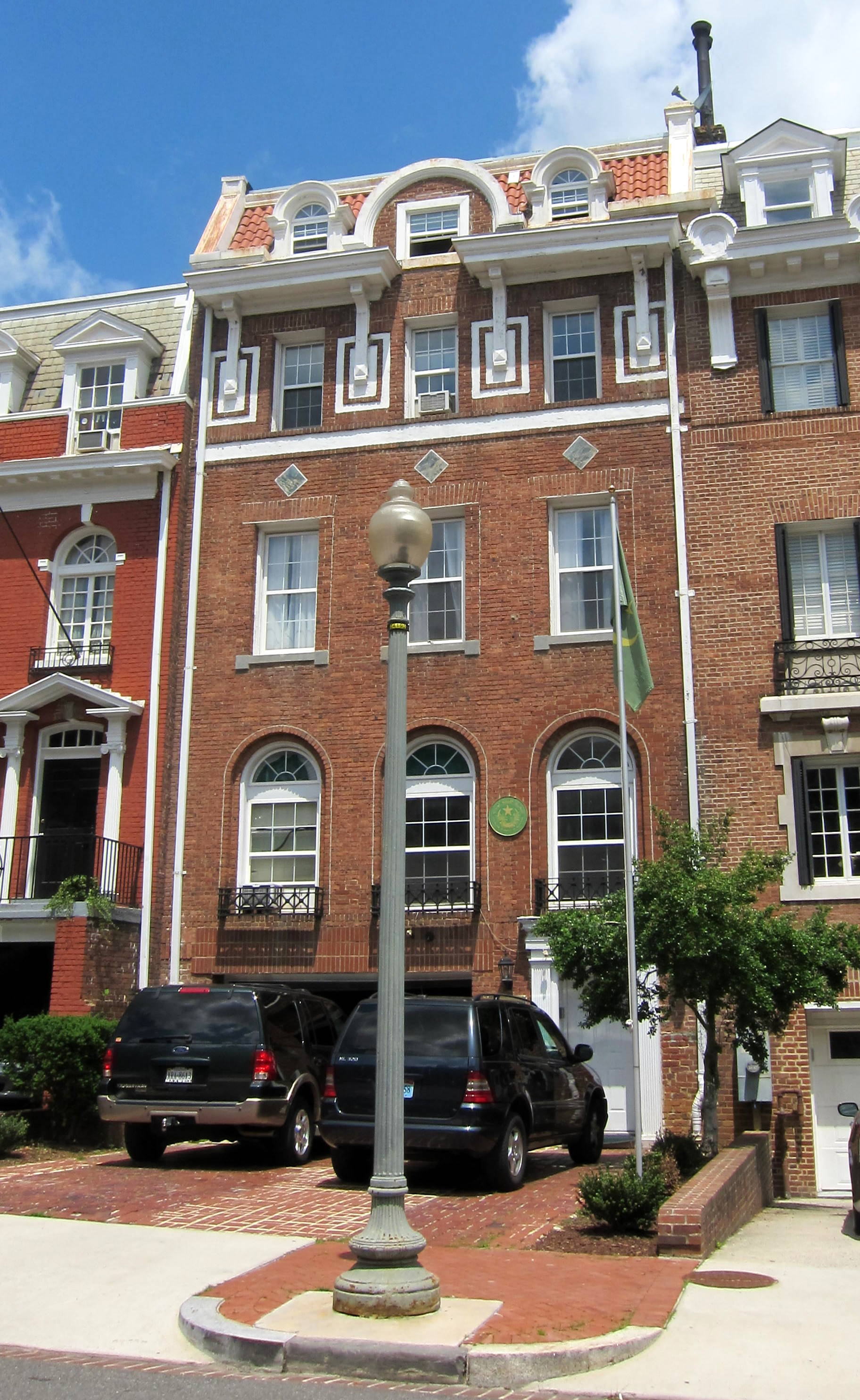
- Incumbent; Mohameden Ould Daddah since June 27, 2016
- Inaugural holder: Souleymane Ould Cheikh Sidiya
- Formation: May 16, 1961

The Mauritanian ambassador in Washington, D. C. is the official representative of the Government of Mauritania to the Government of the United States.

== List of representatives ==
Diplomatic agrément	Diplomatic accreditation	Ambassador	Observations	List of presidents of Mauritania	List of presidents of the United States	Term end
April 21, 1961	May 16, 1961	Souleymane Ould Cheikh Sidya	Mauritanian diplomat and politician b. c. 24.	Moktar Ould Daddah	John F. Kennedy	
May 16, 1961			EMBASSY OPENED	Moktar Ould Daddah	John F. Kennedy	
April 6, 1964	May 6, 1964	Ahmed Baba Miské		Moktar Ould Daddah	Lyndon B. Johnson	
July 28, 1966	August 9, 1966	Abdallahi Ould Daddati		Moktar Ould Daddah	Lyndon B. Johnson	
June 7, 1967			SEVERED RELATIONS.	Moktar Ould Daddah	Lyndon B. Johnson	
December 22, 1969			RESUMED RELATIONS – Chancery opened at 2129 Leroy Place, N.W.	Moktar Ould Daddah	Richard Nixon	
December 22, 1969		Abdou Hacheme	Chargé d'affaires, Né le 28 janvier 1941 à Boutilimit - Faculté de droit de Paris - 2ème secrétaire à la mission Permanente de la RIM auprès de l'ONU depuis septembre 1968.	Moktar Ould Daddah	Richard Nixon	
June 8, 1970		Sidi Ahmed Ould Taya	Sidi Ahmed Ould Taya's Credentials ceremony scheduled, however appointment never kept; Taya returned to NY and his UN post. On March 25, 2008, Sidi Mohamed Ould Cheikh Abdallahi, who had served in Taya's cabinet, took 53% of the vote in the second round, defeating opposition leader Ahmed Ould Daddah.	Moktar Ould Daddah	Richard Nixon	
April 14, 1971		Mohamed El Moctar Bal	Chargé d'affaires, in 1979 he was Chargé d'affaires in Vienna.	Moktar Ould Daddah	Richard Nixon	
August 23, 1971		M'Bareck Ould Bouna Moktar	Chargé d'affaires. In 2004, he was Ambassador in Kinshasa.	Moktar Ould Daddah	Richard Nixon	
December 17, 1971	February 6, 1971	Moulaye el Hassan Ould Moktar		Moktar Ould Daddah	Richard Nixon	
February 22, 1973	March 2, 1973	Ahmedou Ould-Abdallah		Moktar Ould Daddah	Richard Nixon	
May 18, 1976		Mohamed Saïd Hamody	Chargé d'affaires (Maroc dans la soirée du August 20, 2015).	Moktar Ould Daddah	Gerald Ford	
June 16, 1976	July 9, 1976	Mohamed Nassim Kochman		Moktar Ould Daddah	Gerald Ford	
August 19, 1978		Moktar Ould Haye	Chargé d'affaires.	Moktar Ould Daddah	Jimmy Carter	
January 8, 1979	February 26, 1979	Sidi Bouna Ould Sidi		Mustafa Ould Salek	Jimmy Carter	
October 20, 1980	November 24, 1980	Abdallah Ould Daddah		Mohamed Khouna Ould Haidalla	Jimmy Carter	
March 13, 1992	April 2, 1992	Mohamed Fall Ainina		Maaouya Ould Sid'Ahmed Taya	George H. W. Bush	
September 20, 1994	November 21, 1994	Ismail Ould Iyahi		Maaouya Ould Sid'Ahmed Taya	Bill Clinton	
June 11, 1996	July 29, 1996	Bilal Ould Werzeg		Maaouya Ould Sid'Ahmed Taya	Bill Clinton	
June 11, 1997	September 8, 1997	Ahmed Ould Sid'Ahmed		Maaouya Ould Sid'Ahmed Taya	Bill Clinton	
June 6, 1999	August 10, 1999	Ahmed Ould Khalifa Ould Jiddou		Maaouya Ould Sid'Ahmed Taya	Bill Clinton	
September 25, 2000	October 19, 2000	Mohamed Said Ould Hamody		Maaouya Ould Sid'Ahmed Taya	Bill Clinton	
November 26, 2001	December 12, 2001	Mohamedou Ould Michel		Maaouya Ould Sid'Ahmed Taya	George W. Bush	
June 18, 2004	July 15, 2004	Tijani Ould Kerim		Maaouya Ould Sid'Ahmed Taya	George W. Bush	
September 12, 2007	September 18, 2007	Ibrahima Dia		Sidi Ould Cheikh Abdallahi	George W. Bush	
July 28, 2010	August 10, 2010	Mohamed Lemine El Haycen	Born in 1954 in Nouadhibou.	Mohamed Ould Abdel Aziz	Barack Obama	
	June 27, 2016	Mohameden Ould Daddah	April 29, 2015, he was accredited in Brussels.	Mohamed Ould Abdel Aziz	Barack Obama	
	2019	Ba Samba		Mohamed Ould Abdel Aziz and Mohamed Ould Ghazouani.	Donald J. Trump.	.
