= Socialist Union of Mauritanian Muslims =

The Socialist Union of Mauritanian Muslims (Arabic: اتحاد الاشتراكيين المسلمين الموريتانيين, French: Union socialiste des musulmans mauritaniens, abbreviated USMM) was a political party in Mauritania. The party was founded in February 1960. Achmed Ould Kerkoub was the leader of the party.

The party was based in the Adrar Region, and represented French military interests in the area. It submitted its charter to the authorities in Atar on February 25, 1960. USMM supported the French plan of the Common Organization of Saharan Regions (OCRS) and wished that Mauritania would remain within the French Community. The leaders of the party were generally Moor chiefs that had previously been linked to the Mauritanian Regroupment Party (PRM).

The party sought to compete with the banned Nahda party in the Adrar Region, and its charter had some common points with the moderate sectors of Nahda. At the time around the 1958 French constitutional referendum USMM had moved closer to the governing PRM. In 1961 USMM and the other political parties in the country were merged into the Mauritanian People's Party (PPM), the sole legal party in the country.
