= Constitution of Mauritania =

The current Constitution of Mauritania was adopted on July 12, 1991. There have been several constitutions since Mauritania's independence in 1960.

== Current constitution ==
Mauritania's current constitution was officially adopted on 12 July 1991. Under the Constitution, Islam is the state religion, and the President must be a Muslim.

The constitution also provides for universal, equal, and secret suffrage in elections for President and Parliament, either direct or indirect, and the protection of public and individual freedoms, including the right to form political parties, protection from slavery, the right to strike, and the right to property. Specifically listed protected freedoms include freedom of movement, expression, assembly, association, commerce, and intellectual creation.

Under the constitution, the President is elected by universal direct suffrage and is vested with the executive powers including supreme command of the Armed forces, right of appointment to civil and military offices, and promulgation and execution of the law. He is subject to constraints by the Parliament consisting of a unicameral National Assembly (and formerly a Senate, prior to its abolition in 2017), the members of whom are given immunity to prosecution based on their votes. The constitution provides for situations where the President may call for an extraordinary session of Parliament.

The constitution also mandates the independence of the judiciary and protections against arbitrary detention, as well as a High Court of Justice as the supreme court of Mauritania.

A High Islamic Council, an Economic and Social Council, and a National Commission of the Rights of Man are also mandated as consultative councils under the constitution.

A 2006 referendum made the first changes since its initiation, with further amendments in 2017.

== Previous constitutions ==
=== 1961 Constitution ===
As soon as the Islamic Republic of Mauritania was proclaimed in October 1958, the Territorial Assembly changed its name to the Constituent Assembly and immediately initiated work to draft a national constitution; the document was unanimously adopted by the Constituent Assembly in March 1959 in place of the French constitution, and on November 28, 1960, Mauritania declared its Independence. The constitution was ratified on May 20, 1961.

The 1961 Constitution clearly reflected the influence of the Constitution of the French Fifth Republic in its dedication to liberal democratic principles and inalienable human rights as expressed in the 1789 Declaration of the Rights of Man and in the Universal Declaration of Human Rights. In addition, the Constitution underscored the state's determined quest for independence and unity by proclaiming Islam the official religion. Somewhat ironically, freedom of religion was also guaranteed. Strict adherence to both sets of principles would seemingly have given rise to conflict, especially in the area of jurisprudence; however, in practice the government sought with acceptable success to balance the demands of the two.

Under the Constitution, the government was composed of three branches: executive, legislative, and judicial. The executive branch was headed by the President of the Republic and included ministers whom he appointed and the administrative bureaucracy. The president was elected by universal suffrage for a five-year term and could serve an indefinite number of terms. From 1966 until the coup in 1978, all candidates for the office had to be nominated by the Mauritanian People's Party (Parti du Peuple Mauritanien—PPM), be at least thirty-five years old, and have full exercise of their political and civil rights. In sharp contrast to its French antecedent, the Mauritanian Constitution strengthened presidential power by combining it with the function of Prime minister, while making the National Assembly subordinate. Like a prime minister, the president participated in legislative processes that would otherwise reside in the domain of the National Assembly. At the same time, the Constitution prevented the president from dissolving the National Assembly, and it also denied the assembly the right to unseat the president by means of a vote of no confidence.

In its entirety, the Constitution came to resemble those of other francophone African states that were also adopted under the influence of General Charles de Gaulle's Fifth Republic and in response to the perceived need for strong, centralized leadership. In light of the highly fragmented polities typical of much of sub-Saharan Africa at that time, however, a system of checks and balances was thought to be overly cumbersome for the immediate tasks at hand.

Other presidential powers included commanding the Armed forces; appointing civil servants, military officers, judges, and ambassadors; ratifying treaties and other international agreements; initiating or amending legislation; eliciting advisory opinions on proposed legislation from the Supreme Court; and exercising a temporary veto over legislation. Perhaps the president's greatest power lay in his right, in times of peril, to declare an emergency and exercise extraconstitutional authority.

The National Assembly was subordinate to the president. At independence, the assembly numbered forty deputies, all of whom were elected as a slate by universal suffrage for five-year terms. By 1971 the number had grown to fifty and by 1975 to seventy-eight, including the new deputies from the annexed portion of the Western Sahara, Tiris al-Gharbiyya. The presidency of the assembly was the second highest position in the government and often the locus of traditionalist opposition to Daddah. Along with three vice-presidents and two secretaries, the president of the assembly was elected from among the deputies. The assembly's limited power derived from Article 39 of the Constitution and included the formulation of broad policies on national defense, education, labor, and public administration. The assembly also had responsibility for legislating civil rights and taxation. All other legislative powers, including the implementation of specific policy decisions, fell to the president. In general, Daddah's handling of policy matters underscored the imbalance between the two branches of government. For example, although the president was required to present an annual message to the nation and might also provide supplemental statements to the assembly, he alone determined what information to share with legislators, who could not compel him to be more forthcoming. The president could also bypass the legislature completely by submitting proposed legislation to a popular referendum. Finally, the assembly's relatively short session, fixed at four months per year, limited the amount of legislation it could pass.

Constitutional amendments were permissible if they did not threaten the state or its republican form of government. Either the president or the National Assembly could propose an amendment, which would then require a two-thirds vote in the legislature in order to become law. If the proposed amendment received only a simple majority, the president could submit it as a referendum. In fact, the latter process was never necessary. Two major amendments were passed in the 1960s, one in 1965 institutionalizing one-party government, and a second in 1968 pertaining to local administration, the status of magistrates, and the designation of Hassaniya Arabic as an official language.

Although the Constitution did not provide for a system of checks and balances, the assembly did have three ways to limit presidential power. First, it could refuse requested budgetary appropriations, although the president could circumvent the assembly's budgetary veto by simply promulgating an interim budget based on total receipts of the previous year. Second, if able to muster a two-thirds vote, the assembly could impeach the president or any of his ministers for treason or plotting against the state. The Supreme Court, a body appointed by the president, would judge the charges in such cases. Finally, the assembly could, in effect, override a presidential veto if, after a second reading, the law received an absolute majority in the assembly and was declared constitutional by the Supreme Court.

=== 1980 draft constitution ===
The military regime that toppled Daddah in July 1978 abolished the Constitution that had been ratified on May 20, 1961. Then in December 1980, when he unexpectedly announced a return to civilian rule, Haidalla promulgated a new provisional constitution. That draft constitution provided for a multiparty system and freedom of association, provisions Haidalla hoped would attract support from the labor union movement. Following an abortive coup attempt in March 1981 by former members of the military government, however, Haidalla reneged on his intention of returning Mauritania to civilian rule and scrapped the draft constitution.

=== 1985 Constitutional charter ===
The Constitutional Charter of the Military Committee for National Salvation (CMSN), which was promulgated on February 9, 1985, served as a de facto constitution. The charter unequivocally eliminated any of the pretenses of democracy embodied in the 1961 constitution. At the same time, it pledged adherence to the 1948 Universal Declaration of Human Rights and to the charters of the United Nations (UN), the Organization of African Unity (OAU), and the League of Arab States (Arab League). The charter also proclaimed Islam the state religion and sharia the only source of law. Article 14, however, presaged a return to democratic institutions and a new constitution that would bear some semblance to the 1961 Constitution.

The fundamental powers and responsibilities of the CMSN, outlined in Article 3 of the charter, included establishing the general policies of the nation, promulgating ordinances to carry out policy, monitoring actions of the government, ratifying international agreements, and granting amnesty except in cases of retributory justice and religious crimes (see Law and Crime, ch. 5). Articles 4 through 10 pertained to the internal organization of the CMSN and presidential succession. Members were nominated to the CMSN by ordinance of that body, and it alone decided the procedures by which it would conduct its business. Included within the CMSN was the Permanent Committee, consisting of all CMSN members posted to Nouakchott. The Permanent Committee met in ordinary session once every fifteen days and in extraordinary session when convoked by the president. The CMSN was required to meet in ordinary session every third month and in extraordinary session when convoked by the president after approval of the Permanent Committee, or upon the request of one-third of the members. If the president were temporarily absent, the president of the CMSN would nominate a member of the Permanent Committee to carry out the routine affairs of state. If the president were temporarily incapacitated, the Permanent Committee would nominate one of its members to manage affairs of state for a period not to exceed one month. In the event of the president's death or a long-term incapacitation, the Permanent Committee would designate one of its members to carry out the functions of president for one week, after which the entire CMSN would appoint a new president from among its members.

Articles 11 and 12 determined the manner in which the president nominated civilian and military members of government. As head of state and commander in chief of the Armed forces, the president made all nominations for civilian and military posts and for members of the government. Similarly, he could dismiss an appointee at any time. The final four articles of the Constitutional Charter dealt with maintenance of public order and enforcement of CMSN ordinances.

A second ordinance, promulgated at the same time as the charter, governed the internal organization of the CMSN and supplemented the charter. The preamble to this ordinance unequivocally entrusted the CMSN with national sovereignty and legitimacy, but only until replaced by democratic institutions.

The first three articles established de jure membership and rank in the CMSN and delineated the relationship between members of the government and the CMSN. Members of the CMSN ranked higher than members of the government. Accordingly, no member of the CMSN could be sued, searched, arrested, held, or tried while carrying out official duties. No member could be arrested or sued in criminal cases or minor offenses without authorization from either the full CMSN or the Permanent Committee, unless caught in flagrante delicto.

The second article dealt with the selection and responsibilities of the president of the CMSN, who was chosen in a secret ballot by a two-thirds majority of its members and could be deposed in the same way. The president presided over debates and ensured that the Permanent Committee complied with the charter and the committee's regulations. He also controlled debate and could suspend the session at any time. Internally, the CMSN included five advisory commissions dealing with cultural and social affairs, security affairs, public works and development, economy and financial affairs, and education and justice. The commissions monitored the implementation of policy in their respective areas.

In reality, the CMSN in 1987 was a coterie of officers, most of whom were Maures, representing a variety of sometimes overlapping and sometimes discrete corporate and ethnic interests. Among its members, rank, status and influence varied widely. In debates, which were resolved by consensus, the opinions and positions of the acknowledged "big men" were not likely to be challenged openly by members of lower status, who instead might have engaged in surreptitious maneuvering or plotting behind the scenes. The most powerful member of the CMSN in the late 1980s was Col. Ould Taya, who was often described as hardworking and dedicated and whose achievements were the result of strength of purpose rather than political ambition. The second most powerful figure was the Minister of Interior, Information, and Telecommunications, Lieutenant-Colonel Djibril Ould Abdallah, who was often described as "Taya's strongman."

The military government operated through a cabinet whose members, both civilian and military, were appointed by the president, presumably after consultation with members of the CMSN. In 1987 approximately one-third of the fifteen cabinet ministers were also members of the CMSN, although that ratio changed with every cabinet reshuffle. Cabinet officers were responsible for implementing policies initiated by the CMSN.
