= Agriculture in Mauritania =

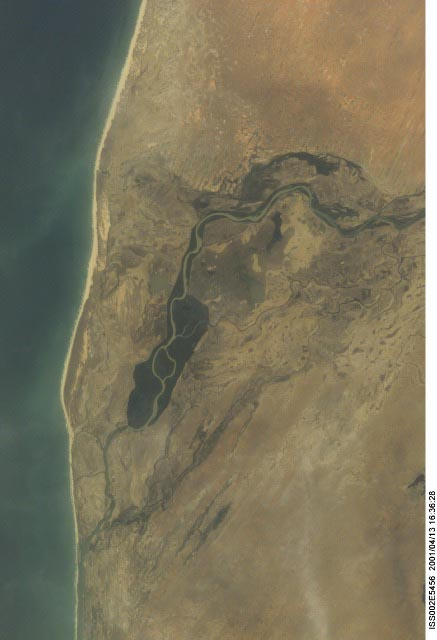
The Sénégal River

Located in the Sahelian and Saharan zones, Mauritania has one of the least developed agricultural bases in West Africa. Arable land represents less than 0.5 percent of the country, leaving it particularly reliant on food imports.

According to the Food and Agriculture Organization of the United Nations (FAO): "The rural sector is one of the most important in the Mauritanian economy. Indeed, over sixty two percent (62%) of the population depend on rural activities for their livelihoods. Rural activities are responsible for 17% of the GDP and are the second highest source of employment in the country (about 21% of the working population). Finally, the sector contributes significantly to meet the country's consumption needs of cereals (30%), red meat (100%) and milk (30%). The useful agricultural area (UAA) represents less than 0.5% of the country (estimated at 502,000 ha). Moreover, 44% of the UAA, or 220,000 ha, is cultivated with rainfed production systems (...) that are highly dependent on rainfall, the water flow and thus on the quality of water infrastructures".

A major reason for Mauritania's economic stagnation since the mid-1970s has been the decline of its rural sector. Government planners neglected both herding and farming until the 1980s, concentrating instead on development in modern sectors such as mining. In the 1960s, livestock and crop production together provided 35 to 45 percent of GDP (at constant 1982 prices). From 1970 to 1986, their contribution to GDP (at constant 1982 prices) averaged 28 percent, with herding accounting for about 20 percent of this figure and with crop production falling to as low as 3 to 5 percent in the worst drought years. This has led to a particular exposition to climate change and the rural sector has been severely affected by droughts, sporadic dry spells and flooding.

Most important to the rural economy has been the livestock subsector. Between 1975 and 1980, herding engaged up to 70 percent of the population, and sedentary farmers constituted about 20 percent of the population. The vast majority of the population lived in the southern one-third of the country, where rainfall levels were high enough to sustain cattle herding. Farming was restricted to the narrow band along the Senegal River where rainfall of up to 600 millimeters per year and annual river flooding sustained crop production as well as large cattle herds. In the dry northern two-thirds of the country, herding was limited to widely scattered pastoral groups that raised camels, sheep, and goats, and farming was restricted to date palms and minuscule plots around oases.

== Climate Change ==
Combatting desertification has been an increasing challenge for Mauritanian Agriculture. More than 2/3 of the territory is desert, and only 0.5% is arable land, which is essentially located along the Senegal River. A 2021 report by the International Monetary Fund stated that "Climate-related natural disasters are becoming more frequent and severe in Mauritania, exacerbating long-standing challenges like land and infrastructure degradation, water stress, and food insecurity". In 2022, the Notre Dame Global Adaptation Initiative ranked Mauritania 20th in the world in terms of in terms of vulnerability to climate change. Desertification has direct consequences on livelihoods, through agriculture and sanitation in rural and urban areas of the country, the latter of which make up more than 60% of the population.

Endeavors to tackle desertification have seen an increase since the early 2000s, and the Mauritanian Government, with support from International Institutions, has targeted climate resilience as a focal point of its agenda. In 2004, Mauritania issued its National Adaptation Program of Action (NAPA), a "mechanism within the United Nations Convention on Climate Change, which is specifically designed to help LDCs to identify their priority adaptation options to climate change and to communicate these in an accessible manner". Since then, new programs have been launched, aimed at promoting new irrigation methods, high-yield drought-resistant crops, new farming techniques, better resource management and understanding of aquifers in the area, amongst other tenets to the persistent issue.

Beyond desertification, irregular flooding in the Senegal river basin has led to vast destruction of crops and pastoral land, as well as the forced displacement of riverine populations. In July 2022, heavy rains caused severe flooding, and the International Federation of Red Cross and Red Crescent Societies report stated that "these floods caused, among others, significant material damage to 4,351 households, or 28,926 people. Fourteen (14) deaths were reported, most of which were children. In the seven (7) affected regions, 3,817 houses were destroyed and a loss of 766 head of livestock was recorded due to the heavy rains".

Efforts to combat climate change and desertification in the country have been undermined by various complex realities such as high corruption, low economic growth and poor results from international and local policies. Moreover, existing debates in the international development sphere are present in Mauritania, where different actors may have divergent agenda's, objectives and constraints which shape the framing of issues, the provision of short-term support, and long term solutions.

== Herding ==
Historically, cattle herding was Mauritania's most important economic activity. In the 1980s, with a cattle-to-people ratio of three to one, the highest in West Africa. Herding provided subsistence for up to 70 percent of the country's people. Herding has been dramatically affected by chronic drought and the attendant rapid advance of the desert. These events have forced shifts in patterns of movement, herd composition and ownership, and increased pressures on lands also occupied by sedentary farmers in the south.

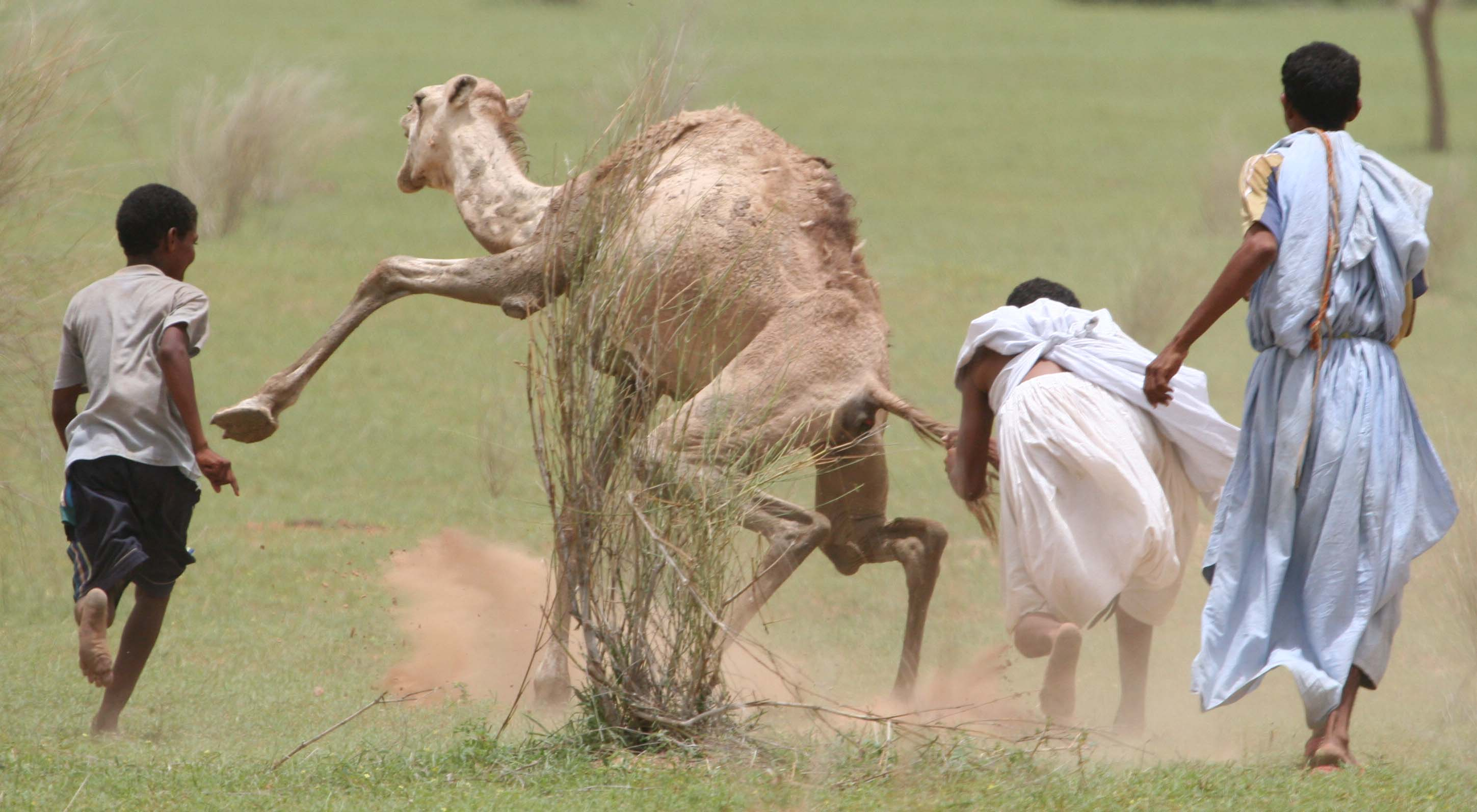

Although sources disagree about herd size, it is clear that numbers have fallen since the 1960s. The decline in herd size probably did not reflect a widescale dying off of animals so much as an increasingly permanent shift of herds to better watered lands in Senegal and Mali.

The drought also caused shifts in the herding of camels (traditionally located in the drier north) and of sheep and goats (held by groups all across Mauritania). These changes were less dramatic than those for cattle, however, because camels, sheep, and goats are more resistant to drought. Although decreases in sheep, goat, and camel herd size in drought years could be significant, recovery was more rapid and sustained. In the years following the 1968-73 drought, camel, sheep, and goat herd sizes increased to predrought levels or higher. The same pattern seemed evident during the 1983-85 drought and the recovery years of the late 1980s. Indeed, the overall size of camel, sheep, and goat herds may have risen since the 1960s, as these hardier animals have moved into areas abandoned by cattle herds. This pattern seems to have been particularly true for the camel herds.

In the 1960s, cattle herds in Mauritania were composed of two basic types: the lighter, short-horned zebu, or "maure," which made up perhaps 85 percent of the national herd; and the heavier, long-horned zebu, or "Fulani." The smaller zebu ranged farther north and were owned by nomadic herders. The larger zebu stayed closer to the better watered riverine areas and were owned by sedentary groups who practiced agriculture in addition to livestock raising.

Although traditional herding patterns persist, considerable changes have taken place. Since the 1968-73 drought, precipitation has been below average. Between 1973 and 1984, as the 150-millimeter isohyet line moved south, livestock often were forced to stay year-round in dry season grazing areas nearer the Senegal River and across the border in Senegal and Mali. Thus, the herd populations were compressed into a smaller area, increasing pressure on land resources and heightening competition among herding groups and between herders and sedentary farmers. Overgrazing in increasingly crowded areas and the cutting of trees and shrubs for firewood and fodder (particularly for sheep and goats) contributed to accelerating desertification and posed a threat to crop production.

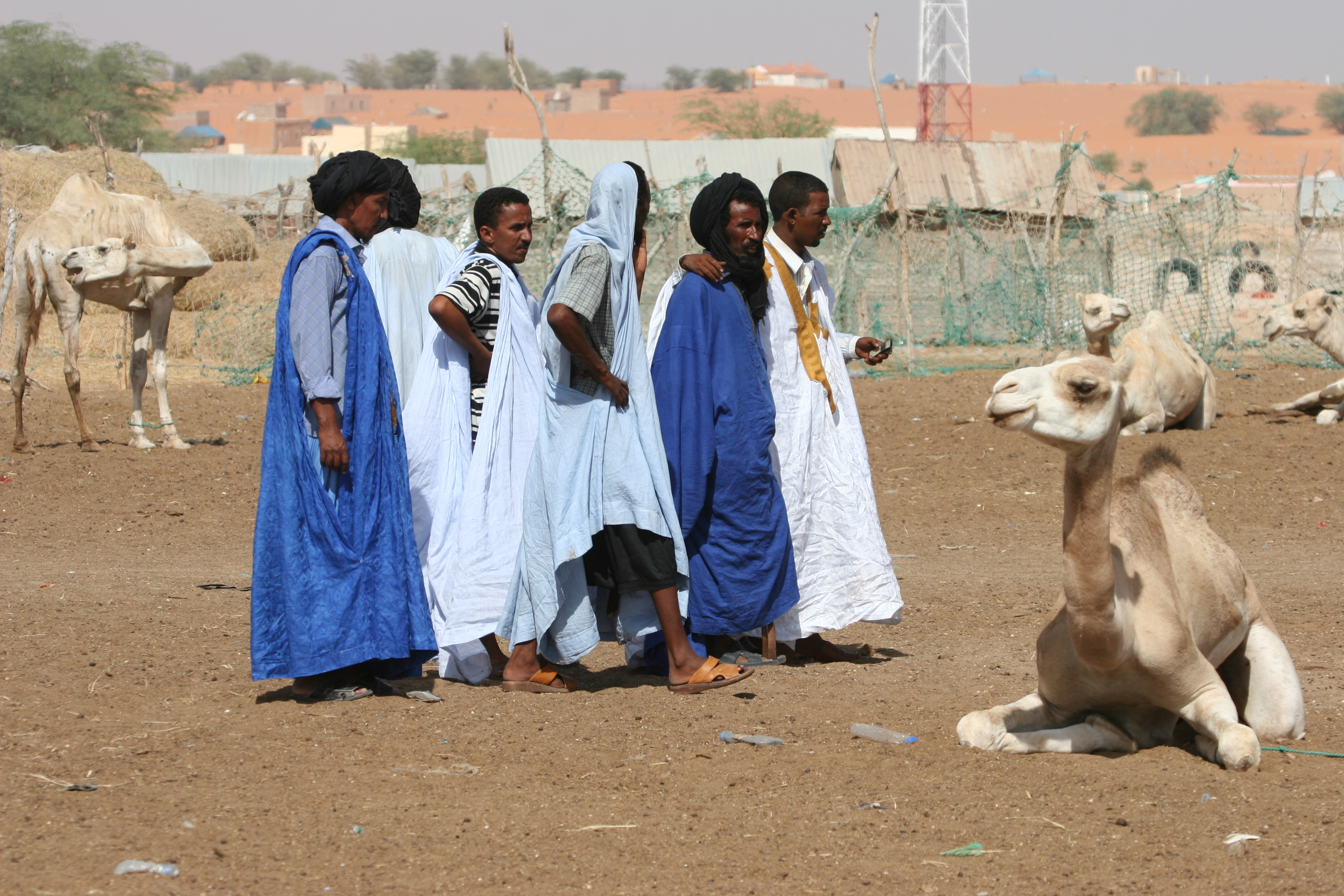
A camel market in Nouakchott

Patterns of herd ownership also changed with drought and the impoverishment of the rural sector. Increasingly, herds belonged to urban investors (mostly government officials and traders) and were cared for by hired personnel (drawn from the pool of destitute pastoralists who, having lost herds, migrated to urban areas). Herders began to take advantage of access to public wells to graze herds in areas traditionally controlled by tribal groups. The extent of this growing system of "absentee herding" was difficult to assess; but by the mid-1980s, as much as 40 percent of the national herd was thought to be involved.

The Ministry of Rural Development of Mauritania was responsible for livestock and natural resource conservation. The ministry's National Livestock Department (Direction Nationale d'Elevage - DNE) was responsible for field services and for the annual rinderpest vaccination campaign. Headquartered in Nouakchott, in the mid-1980s the DNE operated eleven field centers in regional capitals and nineteen veterinary field stations, mostly located in the southern third of the country. Used principally in the annual vaccination campaigns, these field stations offered few other veterinary and extension services. The ministry also operated the National School for Training and Rural Extension (Ecole Nationale de Formation et Vulgarisation Rurale—ENFVR) at Kaédi, which since 1968 has trained veterinary field staff.

In 1981 the government established an autonomous state marketing enterprise, the Mauritanian Livestock Marketing Company (Société Mauritanienne de la Commercialisation du Betail—SOMECOB). This agency had an official, but unenforceable, monopoly over livestock exports and the authority to intervene in market operations to stabilize domestic livestock prices. SOMECOB was also responsible for the Kaédi Abattoir, constructed in 1975 as an export slaughterhouse. By 1986 it functioned for local municipal consumption only, far below capacity, and SOMECOB's exports were negligible. Private exports of live cattle took place without obstruction from SOMECOB. This trade consisted mostly of unrecorded movements into Senegal, Mali, and countries farther south. In the mid-1980s, the most important market for Mauritanian cattle was domestic, centered on Nouakchott, Nouadhibou, and the mining centers.

== Farming ==
Although it is a large country, most of Mauritania is desert. In the late 1980s, arable land was scarce, and, except for some oases, crop production was limited to a narrow band along the southern borders with Senegal and Mali. Farmers practiced four types of agriculture: rain-fed dryland cropping, called dieri; flood recession cropping along the Senegal River and its seasonal tributaries, called oualo; oasis cultivation, the least important; and modern irrigated agriculture.

The most important methods, dieri and oualo, were entirely dependent on limited and erratic rainfall and on the annual flooding of the Senegal River and its only perennial tributary in Mauritania, the Gorgol River. Dieri cultivation occurred during the rainy season, from June–July to September–October, in areas receiving sufficient precipitation (400 to 450 millimeters annually) to grow millet and peas. Oualo plantings occurred during the cold dry season from November to March, to take advantage of ground moisture as the flood waters of the Senegal and Gorgol rivers receded. Sorghum was the major crop for this season. Oasis cultivation drew its water from subterranean sources and so was not dependent on rains. Indeed, areas where oases were located might not experience any significant rainfall for years. Modern irrigated agriculture was only partially dependent on annual rainfall. It depended primarily on dams to retain water from the annual rise on the rivers resulting from rains falling upriver. For the Senegal River, these rains fell principally in the headwaters in eastern Mali and Guinea.

The two major droughts of the African Sahel were prolonged in Mauritania by intermittent dry spells. The result was a serious decline in overall agricultural production. In the 1960s, Mauritania had produced about one-half of its grain needs. By the 1983-85 period, grain harvests had fallen to a level that met only about 3 to 8 percent of the country's grain needs. The cereal deficits have been filled through a combination of commercial imports and international food aid, of which the United States has been the principal donor. During the most serious drought years, from 1983 to 1985, food aid accounted for over 61 percent of Mauritania's available supply of grain, commercial imports of rice by the government covered approximately 20 percent, and imports of flour by private traders provided another 13 percent. Local production was able to cover only 5 percent of need. In the following three years, local production recovered sufficiently to meet about one-third of the annual grain need, estimated in 1986 at 260,000 tons. In that year, local production covered 35 percent of need, government imports supplied 30 percent, and food aid met 35 percent.

Although accurate data were lacking, production of all grains in the recovery years from 1985 to 1987 rose to between 68,000 and 120,000 tons, a large increase over the record low of approximately 20,000 tons in 1984 (see fig. 8). Thus, gross production between 1985 and 1987 attained levels not matched since the mid-1960s. Rising population in the interim meant that, despite this significant recovery, the country remained dependent on imported grains to satisfy its needs.

== Cropping ==
Millet and sorghum were Mauritania's principal crops, followed by rice and corn. Before the 1980s, millet and sorghum accounted for 70 to 80 percent or more of total grain production. Rice production in the 1970s averaged 5 to 10 percent, and corn made up 10 to 25 percent. In the 1980s, rice production grew in importance, as national planning emphasized irrigated agriculture (which favored rice) and a change in dietary habits.

A few other crops were cultivated. Around 10,000 to 15,000 tons of dates were produced annually in the country's oases, mostly for local consumption. During the 1960s, the traditional production of gum arabic (see Glossary) rose to some 5,000 tons a year. By the 1980s, however, production of gum arabic had disappeared. The ill-considered cutting of trees to increase short-term production combined with drought to destroy virtually all of Mauritania's gum-producing acacia trees. By 1986 farmers working irrigated lands produced about 35 percent of the country's grain crops. Of a potentially irrigable area estimated at 135,000 hectares, only some 13,700 hectares were in production in 1985–86. Most of the irrigated land (about 65 percent) was in large-scale developments (500 hectares or more) centered in Bogué and Kaédi, which were controlled by the government through the National Corporation for Rural Development (Société Nationale pour le Développement Rural—SONADER). The remainder were small-scale operations (less than fifty hectares), developed by a newly active private sector centered mainly in Rosso.

In the 1980s, the government put increased emphasis on developing the rural sector. Government planning strategy under the 1985-88 Economic Recovery Program placed the highest priority on rural development (35 percent of planned investments). Particular attention was to be paid to upgrading existing land and developing new irrigated farming and flood recession agriculture. There were also plans involving Mauritania, Mali, and Senegal to integrate rural development and water and flood control through the Senegal River Development Office (Organisation pour la Mise en Valeur du Fleuve Sénégal—OMVS) as the massive Diama and Manantali Dams became fully operational.

== Land tenure ==
The system of land tenure was in transition in the 1980s. Factors contributing to this transition included government abolition of centuries-old slavery practices involving tribal and ethnic relations between various herding and sedentary communities, including adwaba; government development policies, particularly with regard to land reform and large-scale irrigation schemes; and tremendous shifts in land settlement and herding patterns because of drought.

Historically, landownership and range management were based on tribal relations and ethnic settlement patterns. Rangeland for herding was controlled through tribal ownership of wells; around oases, slave groups worked cultivable plots, although traditional noble clans held ownership of the land. In more southerly settled agricultural areas, ownership varied from region to region and village to village, depending on ethnic settlement patterns. Landownership might be vested in the clan or village chief as representative of the group and land distributed in perpetuity to family units having usufruct. Elsewhere, traditional nobilities might hold ownership of lands worked by formerly enslaved groups, who held traditional usufruct. Although a village chief could not sell land belonging to the clan (which would alienate family groups from the land), traditional noble clans could more easily sell property and effectively displace or disinherit slave groups. By the late 1980s, it was not known to what extent the formal abolition of slavery had affected traditional land relationships among noble and former slave groups. Also unknown was the impact of the government's stated policy of giving priority to former slave groups when lands that might be claimed under eminent domain were redistributed.

Of potentially far greater importance in land tenancy was the 1983 Land Reform Act. The underlying first cause of the act was the state's inherent and overriding interest in land development. According to the act, the government could grant title for parcels of undeveloped land—which apparently included fallow land—to whoever pledged to improve it and at the same time possessed requisite resources. Although the economic necessity of the act was beyond question, the social costs of appropriating valuable Senegal River Basin land hypothetically controlled by blacks and redistributing it to wealthy Maures from farther north could prove unacceptable. It was evident, however, that the situation was in considerable flux.

Large-scale government irrigation projects and plans for integrated development based on regional water management created another set of variables for traditional patterns of land use and ownership. Groups located in areas behind dams or in areas to be either permanently flooded or deprived of annual floods with increased control overflow levels in the Senegal River were undergoing a process of controlled resettlement. The formation of cooperative production groups that were to be settled on the land—often on a first-come, first-served basis—was essential to project implementation.

== State regulation ==
In 1986, the government agencies involved in agricultural production, marketing, and food distribution were SONADER, CSA, and SONIMEX.

Created in 1975, SONADER is a public agency under the control of the Ministry of Rural Development. Its general responsibilities focus on planning rural agricultural programs, including building and operating irrigation projects, training farmers in new techniques required for improved irrigation cropping, and providing credit and such inputs as fertilizers and pumping equipment. This agency regularly receives financial aid from the United Nations, such as in 1982, 2005 and 2024.

Organized in 1982 from two other agencies, CSA became responsible for stabilizing grain prices, maintaining a security food stock through market intervention, monitoring production and food deficits, and distributing food aid.

SONIMEX (La Societe Nationale d’Importation et d’Exportation) began operations in 1966 as a government-controlled joint venture. The company held a monopoly on the imports of basic commodities (principally rice, tea, sugar, and tomato paste), which it resold to private interests for the retail trade. The private sector's role in cereal imports was legally restricted to wheat and flour. In 2018, SONIMEX was liquidated. Numerous private traders in the marketing chain, however, were not covered (or were covered only partially) by CSA and SONIMEX. There were no precise data on the extent of domestic production marketed by private traders compared with CSA or on the extent of the grain trade across the Senegal River that was outside the control of SONIMEX.
