= USMM =

USMM may refer to:

- United States Merchant Marine
- French acronym of Socialist Union of Mauritanian Muslims
- ICAO code for Nadym Airport
