= 1956 French legislative election in Mauritania =

Elections to the French National Assembly were held in Mauritania on 2 January 1956. Mauritania had one seat in the Assembly, which was won by Sidi el-Mokhtar N'Diaye, a member of the Mauritanian Progressive Union.

== Results ==
Candidate	Party	Votes	%
Sidi el-Mokhtar N'Diaye	Mauritanian Progressive Union	106,603	85.58
Horma Ould Babana	Mauritanian Entente	17,371	13.95
Ould Jiddou	Independent	585	0.47
Total		124,559	100.00
Valid votes		124,559	97.71
Invalid/blank votes		2,921	2.29
Total votes		127,480	100.00
Registered voters/turnout		217,717	58.55
Source: De Benoist, Sternberger et al.
