= 1965 Mauritanian parliamentary election =

- May 9, 1965

All 70 seats in the National Assembly 36 seats needed for a majority
- Registered: 482,305
- Turnout: 92.82%
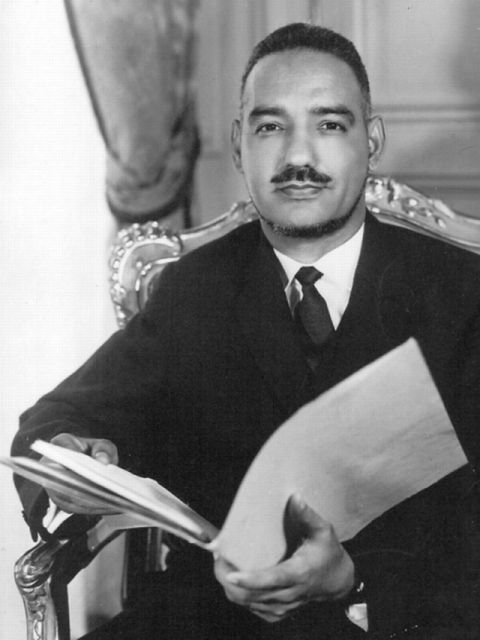
	First party
Leader	Mokhtar Ould Daddah
Party	PPM
Seats won	40
Popular vote	445,844
Percentage	100%

Parliamentary elections were held in Mauritania on 9 May 1965. Following the merger of all the country's political parties into the Mauritanian People's Party (PPM), the country had become a one-party state in December 1961. As such, the PPM was the only party to contest the election, and won all 40 seats in the National Assembly. Voter turnout was 93%.

== Results ==
Party	Votes	%	Seats	+/–
Mauritanian People's Party	445,844	100.00	40	0
Total	445,844	100.00	40	0
Valid votes	445,844	99.59		
Invalid/blank votes	1,816	0.41		
Total votes	447,660	100.00		
Registered voters/turnout	482,305	92.82		
Source: Nohlen et al.
