= 1966 Mauritanian presidential election =

- August 7, 1966
- Registered: 491,320
- Turnout: 96.20% (▲2.68pp)
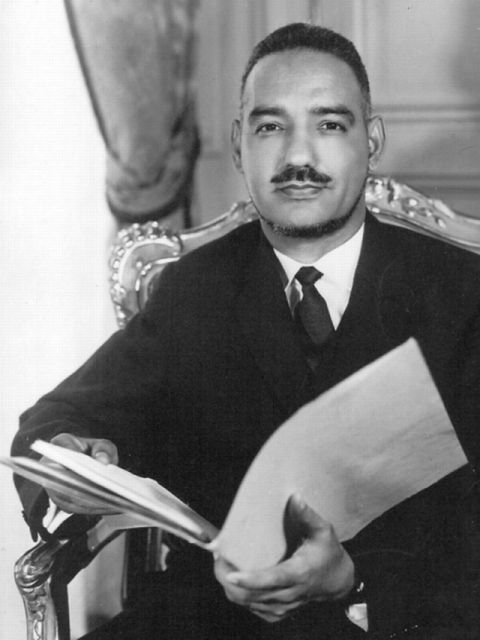
Candidate	Mokhtar Ould Daddah
Party	PPM
Popular vote	471,577
Percentage	100%

Presidential elections were held in Mauritania on 7 August 1966. Following the merger of all the country's political parties into the Mauritanian People's Party (PPM), the country had become a one-party state in December 1961. Its leader, incumbent President Moktar Ould Daddah, was the only candidate, and was re-elected unopposed. Voter turnout was 96%.

It was the second presidential elections held in the country after independence. The country had doubled its GDP between 1959 and 1966, but growth in traditional sectors, such as agriculture, was negligible. In 1966 there was widespread agitation against the government by Mauritanian Black Africans against imposing Arab education and civil life.

== Background ==
Mauritania came under the direct control of the French Colonial Empire in 1933. After independence on 28 November 1960, the country declared itself the Islamic Republic of Mauritania with Ould Daddah becoming its first President . He declared the country a one-party state in 1964 and in 1965 all parties merged with the ruling Mauritanian Assembly Party to form the Mauritanian People's Party.

Between 1961 and 1965, Ould Daddah faced pressure on some of the provinces annexed by the neighboring Morocco under Sultan Mohamed V and sought support from the Arab neighbors. He also maintained relations with French government and sought the help to station its troops in Mauritania which would go on until 1966. The government was also facing different issues on development and tribal orientation. During this period, the country lacked its own currency.

In 1966 there were widespread agitation against the government by Black Africans against imposing Arab education and civil life. However, Ould was effective in controlling the opposition. Historians consider his rule moving to an extent of dictatorship as both the opposition inside the PPM and across Mauritania were effectively suppressed. From 1959 to 1966, the GDP of the country doubled, but only in mining sector, leaving the traditional sectors such as agriculture and fishing without any growth.

== Results ==
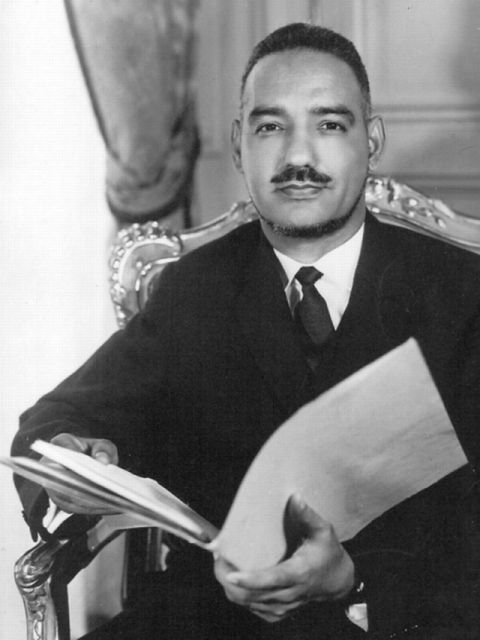
Moktar Ould Daddah, the incumbent President and winner of the 1966 Presidential elections

Candidate	Party	Votes	%
Moktar Ould Daddah	Mauritanian People's Party	471,577	100.00
Total		471,577	100.00
Valid votes		471,577	99.77
Invalid/blank votes		1,080	0.23
Total votes		472,657	100.00
Registered voters/turnout		491,320	96.20
Source: Nohlen et al.
