= 1976 Mauritanian presidential election =

- August 8, 1976
- Registered: 648,876
- Turnout: 97.85% (▲1.56pp)
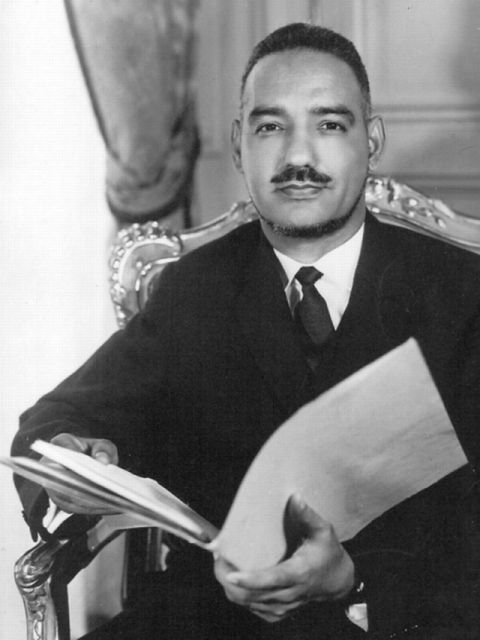
Candidate	Mokhtar Ould Daddah
Party	PPM
Popular vote	630,635
Percentage	100%

Presidential elections were held in Mauritania on 8 August 1976, alongside a parliamentary by-election for the new seven seats representing Tiris El Gharbiya, the Mauritanian-occupied area of Western Sahara. At the time, the country was a one-party state with the Mauritanian People's Party (PPM) as the sole legal party. Its leader, incumbent President Moktar Ould Daddah, was the only candidate and was re-elected unopposed. Voter turnout was 97.9%. They were the last elections held until the restoration of multi-party democracy in 1992.

The elections were held during a time when Mauritania along with Morocco held a treaty to partition provinces of Western Sahara during 1975 while independence was fought in the province by Polisario Front. Daddah claimed that the winning the elections was a mandate for annexing the provinces of Western Sahara.

== Background ==
Mauritania came under the direct control of the French Colonial Empire during 1933. After independence on 28 November 1960, the country declared itself the Islamic Republic of Mauritania, with Ould Daddah becoming its first President. He declared the country a one-party state in 1964, and in 1965 all parties merged into the ruling Mauritanian Assembly Party to form the Mauritanian People's Party (MPP).

Daddah changed his stance from pro-French to nationalist during the early 1970s. He terminated the defense treaty with France in 1972, discontinued the French currency bloc and nationalized French property. He also showed interest in annexing oil rich regions of Western Sahara, which was contested by Morocco and Algeria. A war erupted between Morocco and the Sahrawi national liberation movement, the Polisario Front, which proclaimed the Sahrawi Arab Democratic Republic (SADR) with a government in exile in Tindouf, Algeria. Although Daddah initially allied with Algeria in opposing Morocco, during 1974, he realigned his position and is believed to have made a secret agreement with the king of Morocco. This eventually led to an agreement in 1975 that partitioned Spanish Sahara between Mauritania and Morocco.

== Results ==
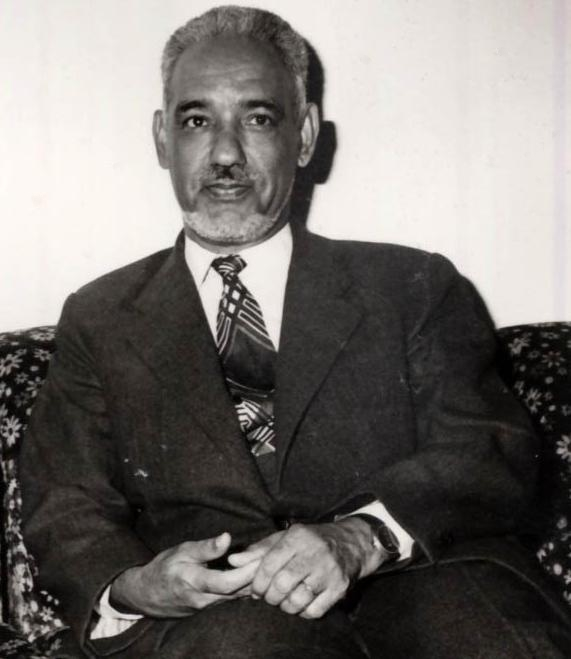
Moktar Ould Daddah, the incumbent president and winner of the 1976 Presidential elections

Candidate	Party	Votes	%
Moktar Ould Daddah	Mauritanian People's Party	630,635	100.00
Total		630,635	100.00
Valid votes		630,635	99.32
Invalid/blank votes		4,301	0.68
Total votes		634,936	100.00
Registered voters/turnout		648,876	97.85
Source: Nohlen et al.
