= November 1946 French legislative election in Mauritania =

Elections to the French National Assembly were held in Mauritania on 10 November 1946. Previously Mauritania had elected MPs in a single joint constituency with neighbouring Senegal, but the new 1946 constitution had separated the two territories politically, giving Mauritania one seat in the Assembly. The result was a victory for Horma Ould Babana, a member of the French Section of the Workers' International. His opponents were Yvon Razac, a member of the MRP and the candidate favored by the French government and traditional Moorish leaders, and Souleymane Diop, an independent.

== Results ==
Candidate	Party	Votes	%
Horma Ould Babana	French Section of the Workers' International	6,177	65.36
Yvon Razac	Popular Republican Movement	3,209	33.95
Souleymane Diop	Independent	65	0.69
Total		9,451	100.00
Valid votes		9,451	99.08
Invalid/blank votes		88	0.92
Total votes		9,539	100.00
Registered voters/turnout		16,271	58.63
Source: French National Assembly, Thompson & Adloff
