= 1952 Mauritanian Territorial Assembly election =

Territorial Assembly elections were held in Mauritania on 30 March 1952. The result was a victory for the Mauritanian Progressive Union, which won 22 of the 24 seats.

== Electoral system ==
The Territorial Assembly was elected by two colleges; the first college elected 8 members and the second 16.

== Results ==
Party	First College			Second College			Total seats
Party	Votes	%	Seats	Votes	%	Seats	Total seats
Mauritanian Progressive Union				31,644	–	12	12
Mauritanian Entente				10,937	–	1	1
Union for the Defence of Mauritania and the French Union	277		5				5
French Union	183		3				3
Other parties			0			0	0
Independents				5,697	–	3	3
Total			8			16	24
Total votes	647	–		61,597	–		
Registered voters/turnout	1,020	63.43		130,441	47.22		
Source: De Benoist
