= Mauritanian Progressive Union =

Mauritanian Progressive Union Union progressiste mauritanienne
- Abbreviation: UPM
- Leader: Moktar Ould Daddah
- Founded: February 1948
- Dissolved: 1958
- Merged into: Mauritanian Regroupment Party

The Mauritanian Progressive Union (French: Union progressiste mauritanienne, UPM) was a political party in pre-independence Mauritania.

== History ==
The UPM was established in February 1948, in order to form a more conservative and regionally-based opposition to the Mauritanian Entente party. The first election contested by the party was the 1951 French National Assembly elections, in which its candidate N'Diaye Sidi el Moktar defeated the incumbent MP Horma Ould Babana. The following year Moktar Ould Daddah became party leader. The Territorial Assembly elections that year saw the UPM won 22 of the 24 seats.

N'Diaye was re-elected in the 1956 French elections, receiving 84% of the vote. The 1957 Territorial Assembly elections saw the party win 33 of the 34 seats.

In 1958 the party merged with the Mauritanian Entente and the Gorgol Democratic Bloc to form the Mauritanian Regroupment Party.
