= Tijani Ould Kerim =

Mauritanian diplomat (born 1951)

Tijani Ould Kerim (born 13 December 1951, in Mederdra, Mauritania) is a Mauritania teacher and diplomat.

== Early life ==
Kerim graduated from Sorbonne University in Paris in 1976.

== Career ==
His first career path was to become a teacher. Later he was president of the Mauritanian Youth organisation (JPPM) and High Commissioner for Youth (Junior Minister) under President Mokhtar Ould Daddah, between 1977 and 1978. He became a Member of Parliament between 1992 and 1996. He then became the Mauritanian diplomat to Gambia, from 1996 to 1999. After this he became the ambassador to the Ivory Coast from 1999 to 2002, to Canada from 2002 to 2004 and to the United States from 2004.
