= 1957 Mauritanian Territorial Assembly election =

Territorial Assembly elections were held in Mauritania on 31 March 1957. The result was a victory for the Mauritanian Progressive Union, which won 33 of the 34 seats. The other seat was won by an independent candidate in the Baie du Levrier constituency.

== Results ==
| Party | Votes | % | Seats | +/– |
|---|---|---|---|---|
| Mauritanian Progressive Union | 252,898 | 94.91 | 33 | +11 |
| Democratic Bloc of Gorgol | 5,126 | 1.92 | 0 | – |
| Union of the Natives of Southern Mauritania | 1,737 | 0.65 | 0 | – |
| Independents | 6,713 | 2.52 | 1 | –2 |
| Total | 266,474 | 100.00 | 34 | +10 |
| Valid votes | 266,474 | 99.37 | | |
| Invalid/blank votes | 1,680 | 0.63 | | |
| Total votes | 268,154 | 100.00 | | |
| Registered voters/turnout | 376,152 | 71.29 | | |
Source: Sternberger et al.
