= 1971 Mauritanian general election =

- August 8, 1971
- Registered: 534,994
- Presidential election
- Turnout: 96.29% (▲0.09pp)
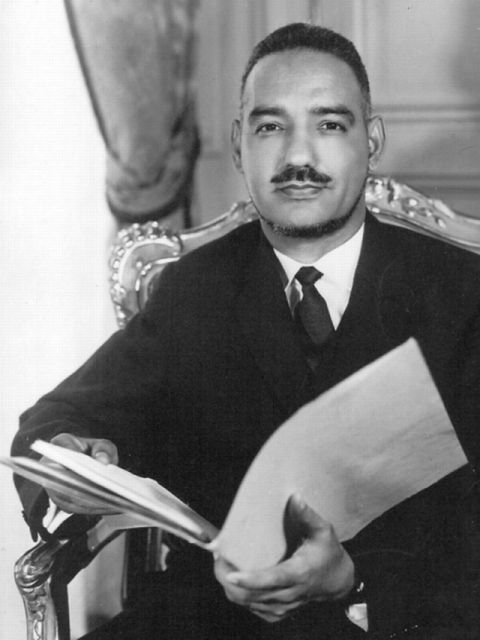
Candidate	Mokhtar Ould Daddah
Party	PPM
Popular vote	512,708
Percentage	100%
- Parliamentary election
- All 50 seats in the National Assembly; 26 seats needed for a majority
- Turnout: 95.59% (▲2.77pp)
Party	Leader	Vote %	Seats	+/–
PPM	Mokhtar Ould Daddah	100	50	+10
This lists parties that won seats. See the complete results below.

General elections were held in Mauritania on 8 August 1971 to elect a President and National Assembly, the first time the two elections had been held together. At the time, the country was a one-party state with the Mauritanian People's Party (PPM) as the sole legal party. Its leader, incumbent President Moktar Ould Daddah, was the only candidate in the presidential election, and was re-elected unopposed to a third term in office, whilst the PPM won all 50 seats in the National Assembly election. Voter turnout for the parliamentary election was reported to be 95.6%.

== Background ==
Mauritania came under the direct control of the French Colonial Empire during 1933. After independence on 28 November 1960, the country declared itself the Islamic Republic of Mauritania, with Ould Daddah becoming its first President. He declared the country a one-party state in 1964, and during 1965 all parties merged with the ruling Mauritanian Assembly Party to form the Mauritanian People's Party.

== Results ==
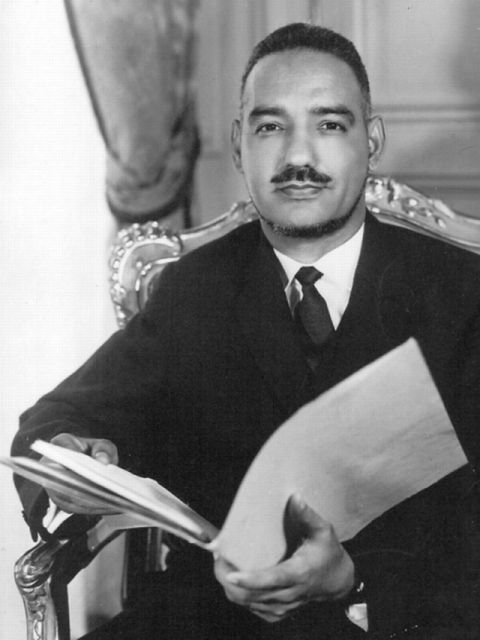
Moktar Ould Daddah, the incumbent President and winner of the 1966 Presidential elections

=== President ===
Candidate	Party	Votes	%
Moktar Ould Daddah	Mauritanian People's Party	512,708	100.00
Total		512,708	100.00
Valid votes		512,708	99.53
Invalid/blank votes		2,413	0.47
Total votes		515,121	100.00
Registered voters/turnout		534,994	96.29
Source: Nohlen et al.

=== National Assembly ===
All the Mauritanian People's Party candidates were elected unopposed.

Party	Votes	%	Seats	+/–
Mauritanian People's Party	504,406	100.00	50	+10
Total	504,406	100.00	50	+10
Valid votes	504,406	98.63		
Invalid/blank votes	7,008	1.37		
Total votes	511,414	100.00		
Registered voters/turnout	534,994	95.59		
Source: Nohlen et al.
