= Adwaba =

Adwaba are agricultural villages in Mauritania, mainly inhabited by former slaves and other lower castes. A large of proportion of Mauritania's rural poor is made up of adwaba.

== See also ==
- Slavery in Mauritania
