= Mauritanian National Union =

The Mauritanian National Union (French: Union nationale mauritanienne, abbreviated UNM) was a political party in Mauritania. The party was founded in April 1959, as a merger between a dissident group in the Mauritanian Regroupment Party (PRM) and the Union of Natives of Southern Mauritania (UOMS). The foundation of the party took place in the run-up to the May 1959 legislative elections. Members of the party bureau of UNM included Hadrami Ould Khatrri (political secretary), Moussa Sall, Yacoub Ould Boumediana (chairman) and Ba Abdoul Aziz (administrative secretary). The UNM favoured unity with the neighbouring states in the Mali Federation.

The party had most of its support from the Black populations of southern Mauritania. The party could not contest the May 17, 1959 legislative elections, having been formed too soon before the polls. The party held its founding conference in July 1959, in Aïoun. At the conference, the party declared itself as 'the Mauritanian section of the Party of the African Federation' (PFA), a move reciprocated in a greeting from the PFA bureau two months later.

In February 1960 Hadrami, Yacoubi and Ba were arrested, charged with conspiring against the integrity of the state.

Once the Mali Federation collapsed, the jailed UNM leaders were released. Subsequently the party moved closed to Moktar Ould Daddah. The party was pressured to align with PRM and on October 10, 1960 the two parties formed a united front. At a meeting held on June 30, 1961 leaders of PRM, UNM and the former Nahda agreed to merge their parties. Subsequently, the Mauritanian People's Party (PPM) was formed as the sole legal party in the country.
