= 1983 Land Reform Act =

Mauritanian law

The 1983 Land Reform Act was an act of Mauritanian law dealing with land tenure in Mauritania.

The underlying first cause of the act was the state's inherent and overriding interest in land development. According to the act, the government could grant title for parcels of undeveloped land which apparently included fallow land to whoever pledged to improve it and at the same time possessed requisite resources. Although the economic necessity of the act was beyond question, the social costs of appropriating valuable Senegal River Basin land hypothetically controlled by blacks and redistributing it to wealthy Maures from farther north proved difficult to conduct.
