= France–Mauritania relations =

- France: Mauritania

Relations between France and Mauritania date back to the colonial era when Mauritania was part of French West Africa.

== History ==
Most of Mauritania's developmental assistance in the 1980s was provided by France, which was also the major supplier of private direct investment. Bilateral accords signed with France in 1961 provided for economic, financial, technical, cultural, and military cooperation and aid. Although Mauritania opposed France on Algerian independence, nuclear testing in the Sahara, and French arms sales to South Africa, ties remained cordial through the Daddah term. French citizens worked in Mauritania as technical assistants in the government, administrators, teachers, and judges. Daddah frequently traveled to France, and French development aid flowed to Mauritania. The level of French involvement rose markedly following the outbreak of hostilities in the Western Sahara. Between 1976 and 1979, when Mauritania unilaterally declared peace and withdrew from combat, French aircraft provided air support for Mauritanian troops fighting Polisario forces, and French paratroops were stationed at Nouadhibou.

Activity by Mauritanian dissidents in France, together with Mauritania's gradual policy shift toward the Polisario, resulted in a growing coolness toward Paris. In May 1979, Mauritania asked France to remove its troops from Nouadhibou. France continued to provide a high level of financial aid, although less than requested by the Haidalla government, and this curtailment further strained ties. Following alleged accusations of Moroccan support of a coup attempt in March 1981, Haidalla again turned to France to obtain guarantees of Mauritania's territorial integrity. French president François Mitterrand and Haidalla concluded an accord in 1981, as Morocco threatened to carry the struggle against Polisario guerrillas into Mauritanian territory. As Morocco's advancing sand walls increasingly obligated Polisario guerrillas to use Mauritania as a staging area, President Haidalla and, later, President Taya sought and received guarantees of French support in August 1984 and June 1987.

== Trade ==
All imports from Mauritania to France are duty-free and quota-free, with the exception of armaments, as part of the Everything but Arms initiative of the European Union.

== Resident diplomatic missions ==
- France has an embassy in Nouakchott.
- Mauritania has an embassy in Paris.
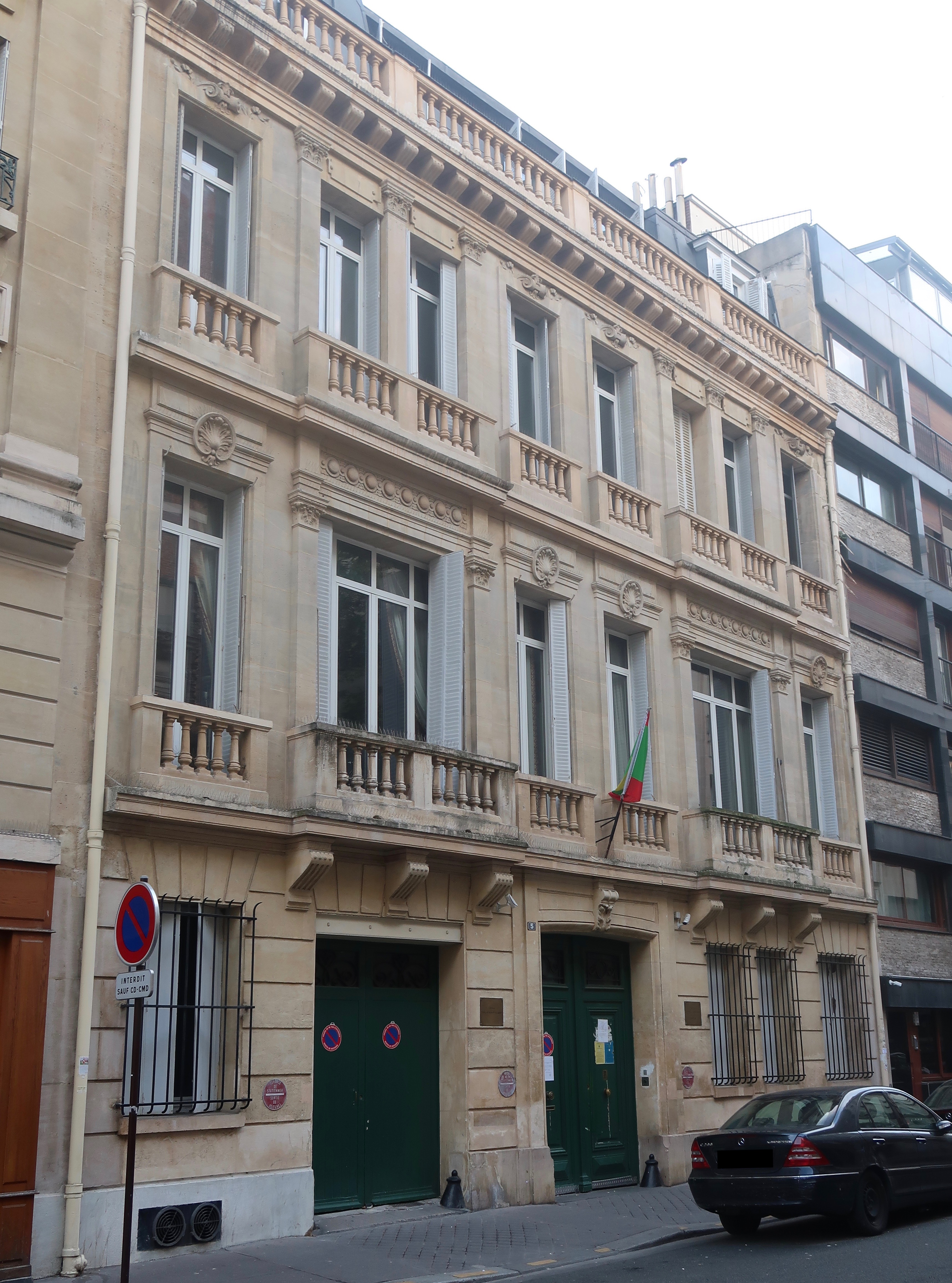
Embassy of Mauritania in Paris

== See also ==
- Foreign relations of France
- Foreign relations of Mauritania
