= Mauritanian People's Party =

Mauritanian People's Party حزب الشعب الموريتاني (Arabic) Parti du peuple mauritanien (French)
- Founder: Moktar Ould Daddah
- Founded: 28 November 1960 (65 years, 0 days)
- Banned: 10 July 1978 (47 years, 141 days)
- Preceded by: Mauritanian Regroupment Party; Association de la Jeunesse Mauritanienne; Mauritanian National Renaissance Party; Mauritanian National Union; Socialist Union of Mauritanian Muslims
- Headquarters: Nouakchott

Mauritanian People's Party (PPM, French: Parti du peuple mauritanien; Arabic: حزب الشعب الموريتاني, romanized: Hizb al-Sha'ab al-Muritaniy) was the sole legal party of Mauritania from 1961 to 1978. It was headed by President Moktar Ould Daddah.

Daddah founded the party shortly after Mauritania's independence from France in November 1960 by merging his Mauritanian Regroupment Party with opposition parties including Association de la Jeunesse Mauritanienne, Nahda, the Mauritanian National Union, and the Socialist Union of Mauritanian Muslims. The parties were united at a meeting of their political leadership in December 1961, and Daddah proceeded to enact a range of repressive laws, banning alternative political parties and bestowing virtually unlimited power upon the presidency.

Following the 10 July 1978 coup led by Mustafa Ould Salek, Mauritania's civilian leadership was replaced with military rule and the party was abolished and banned.

== Electoral history ==
=== Presidential elections ===
Election	Party candidate	Votes	%	Result
1966	Moktar Ould Daddah	471,577	100%	Elected ✓
1971	Moktar Ould Daddah	512,708	100%	Elected ✓
1976	Moktar Ould Daddah	630,635	100%	Elected ✓

=== National Assembly elections ===
Election	Party leader	Votes	%	Seats	+/–	Position	Result
1965	Moktar Ould Daddah	445,844	100%	40 / 40	▲40	▲1st	Sole legal party
1971	Moktar Ould Daddah	504,406	100%	50 / 50	▲10	1st	Sole legal party
1975	Moktar Ould Daddah	574,758	100%	70 / 70	▲20	1st	Sole legal party
1976 (by-election)	Moktar Ould Daddah		100%	7 / 7	▲7	1st	Sole legal party

== See also ==
- List of Islamic political parties
