= Mauritanian Regroupment Party =

Mauritanian Regroupment Party Parti de Regroupement Mauritanien حزب التجمع الموريتاني
- President: Sidi el-Mokhtar N'Diaye
- Secretary-General: Moktar Ould Daddah
- Founder: Moktar Ould Daddah
- Founded: May 1958
- Dissolved: 4 October 1961
- Preceded by: UPM; Mauritanian Entente; BDG
- Succeeded by: Mauritanian People's Party
- Headquarters: Nouakchott
- Ideology: Mauritanian nationalism

The Mauritanian Regroupment Party (PRM, French: Parti de Regroupement Mauritanien; Arabic: حزب التجمع الموريتاني) was a political party in Mauritania from 1958 to 1961. Although nominally led by party President Sidi el-Mokhtar N'Diaye, it was de facto headed by Moktar Ould Daddah.

== Foundation ==
Daddah founded the party in May 1958 in an attempt to unite the various competing political groups within Mauritania into a single inclusive organisation so as to both strengthen the credibility of Mauritanian independence movement and secure his own power. At the Council of Aleg Daddah persuaded the Mauritanian Progressive Union, the Mauritanian Entente, and the black nationalist Bloc Démocratique du Gorgol to merge to form the Mauritanian Regroupment Party.

== Ideology ==
The party was strongly nationalistic, and opposed the inclusion of Mauritania into either a Greater Morocco, or any other form of federation, rejecting a proposal by France for a federation uniting all of its Saharan African territories into a Common Saharan States Organization. The party did however favour joining the French Community, and campaigned for a yes vote in the 1958 referendum.

The party sought to maintain the balance between Mauritania's Moorish and Black African communities, and local PRM committees were set up that were open to all citizens. In July 1958 more radical anti-French and Arab nationalist members were expelled, and later formed the Nadha party on September 26, 1958. The PRM moved closer to Mali for support against Morocco's plans for the inclusion of Mauritania in a Greater Morocco, plans which the Arab nationalist Nadha party supported. The PRM also developed a more flexible attitude towards France.

== Independence & Dissolution ==
The PRM went on to win every seat at the 1959 parliamentary election, although did so largely due to non-PRM political activity being banned, and PRM loyalists controlling selections to the electoral lists. Following independence in November 1960 most Mauritanian politicians rallied around Daddah and the PRM, and relations between the PRM and the Nadha party warmed, with the latter being granted several seats in the Council of Ministers in September 1961.

In October 1961 Daddah organised a Conference of Unity, and on 4 October the PRM was merged with several other Mauritanian parties to form the Mauritanian People's Party.

== Electoral history ==
=== Presidential elections ===
| Election | Party candidate | Votes | % | Result |
|---|---|---|---|---|
| 1961 | Moktar Ould Daddah | 370,970 | 100% | Elected ✓ |

=== National Assembly elections ===
| Election | Party leader | Votes | % | Seats | +/– | Position | Result |
|---|---|---|---|---|---|---|---|
| 1959 | Moktar Ould Daddah | 350,126 | 100% | 40 / 40 | ▲40 | ▲1st | Sole legal party |
