= Moktar Ould Daddah =

President of Mauritania from 1960 to 1978

- مختار ولد داداه
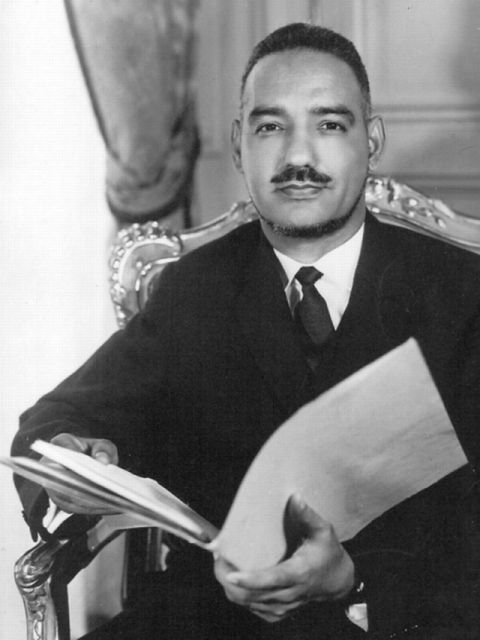
- Ould Daddah in 1960

1st President of Mauritania
- In office 28 November 1960 – 10 July 1978
- Preceded by: Position established
- Succeeded by: Mustafa Ould Salek

1st Prime Minister of Mauritania
- In office 21 May 1957 – 20 August 1961 (4 years, 91 days)
- President: Himself
- Preceded by: Office established
- Succeeded by: Office abolished (eventually Ahmed Ould Bouceif as Prime Minister in 1979)

Personal details
- Born: 25 December 1924 Boutilimit, French Mauritania, French West Africa
- Died: 14 October 2003 (aged 78) Paris, France
- Party: Mauritanian People's Party
- Spouse(s): Marie Thérèse Gadroy (m. 1958–2003; his death)
- Relations: Ahmed Ould Daddah (half-brother)

Moktar Ould Daddah (Arabic: مختار ولد داداه, romanized: Mukhtār Wald Dāddāh; 25 December 1924 – 14 October 2003) was a Mauritanian politician who served as the country's first president after it gained its independence from France. Moktar served as the country's first Prime Minister from 1957 to 1961 and as its first President of Mauritania, a position he held for 18 years until he was deposed in a military coup d'etat in 1978.

He established an authoritarian one-party state, with his Mauritanian People's Party being the sole legal political entity in the country, and followed a policy of "Islamic socialism" with many nationalizations of private businesses. In his memoirs, Moktar expressed concern that the issue of slavery in Mauritania could lead to armed conflict that would ultimately destroy the country.

In foreign affairs, he joined the Non-Aligned Movement and maintained strong links with Mao Zedong and the People's Republic of China, but he also accepted Western (especially French) foreign aid. During his presidency, Mauritania saw conflict with the Polisario Front in Western Sahara after working to broker a deal to divide the territory with Morocco.

== Background ==
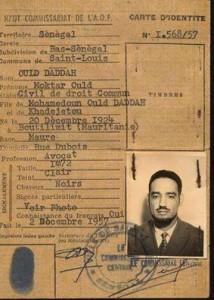
Old national identity card of Moktar Ould Daddah

Moktar was born to an important marabout family of the Ouled Birri tribe in Boutilimit, Mauritania, French West Africa. After attending elite Islamic academies, he worked for the French colonial administrators as a translator.

As a law student in Paris, he graduated as the first Mauritanian to hold a University Degree. He was later admitted to the bar at Dakar, Senegal in 1955. Upon his return to Mauritania in the late 1950s, Moktar joined the centre-left Mauritanian Progressive Union, and was elected president of its Executive Council. In 1959, however, he established a new political party, the Mauritanian Regroupment Party. In the last pre-independence legislative elections held later that year, his party won every seat in the National Assembly, and he was appointed Prime Minister.

He was known for his ability to establish a consensus among different political parties, as well as between the White Moors, Black Moors and Black Africans, Mauritania's three main ethnic groups. The balanced representation of different ethnic and political groups in his government won the confidence of the French authorities, who granted independence to Mauritania under his leadership in 1960. Moktar was named acting president of the new Islamic Republic, and was confirmed in office in the first post-independence election in August 1961.

== President of Mauritania (1960–1978) ==
As president, Moktar pursued policies that differed markedly from those he had professed prior to independence. In September 1961, he formed a "Government of National Unity" with the main opposition party, and in December, he arranged for the four largest parties to merge as the Mauritanian People's Party (PPM), which became the sole legal party. He formalized the one-party state in 1964 with a new Constitution, which set up an authoritarian presidential regime. Moktar justified this decision on the grounds that he considered Mauritania unready for western-style multi-party democracy.

Under this one-party constitution, Moktar was reelected in uncontested elections in 1966, 1971 and 1976.

Visit by Moktar Ould Daddah to the Commission of the European Communities, 21 February 1978

In 1971, Moktar served as President of the Organization of African Unity (OAU). At home, however, his policies were criticized. The economy remained strongly dependent on Chinese and French foreign aid. Moreover, drought in the Sahel, principally in the period between 1969 and 1974, and a decline in export revenues due to fall in international prices of iron, had lowered living standards considerably. In 1975, he presented a charter which called for Mauritania to become an "Islamic, nationalist, centralist, and socialist democracy." This charter was initially popular, and the opposition, in general, welcomed it.

== War in Western Sahara ==
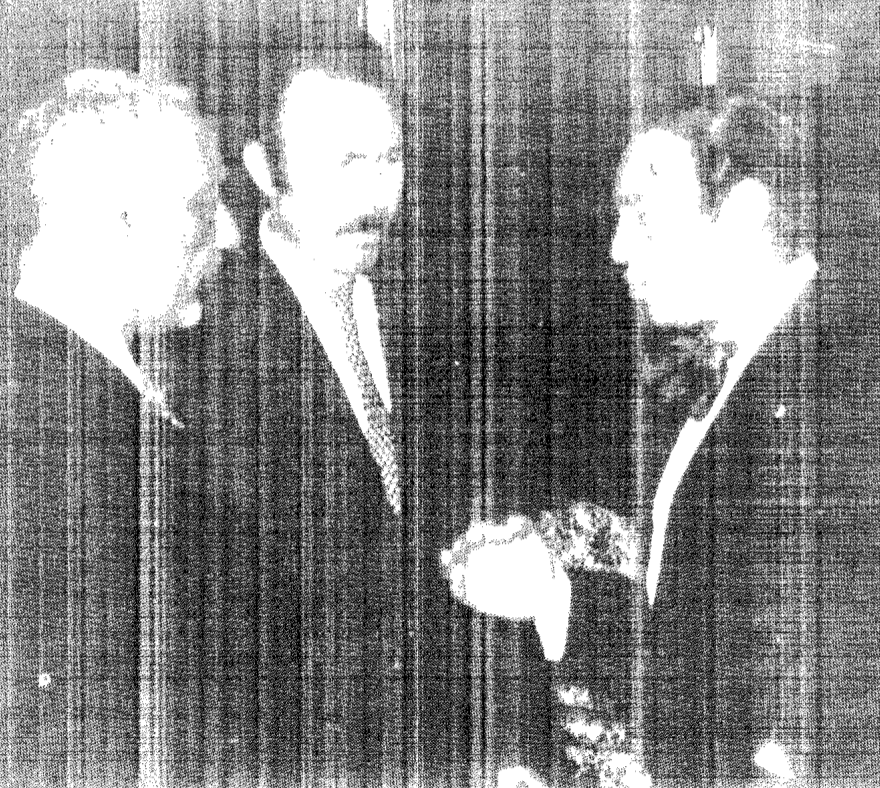
Ould Daddah (left) with Houari Boumédiène and Hassan II of Morocco in Agadir c. 1973

What brought an end to Moktar's regime was Mauritania's war in Western Sahara against the Polisario Front, an indigenous movement fighting against the Moroccan-Mauritanian attempt to jointly annex the territory, starting in 1975. Moktar had claimed the territory as part of Greater Mauritania since 1957, three years before independence, but the idea had only limited support in the general population. The Mauritanian Moors are closely related to the Sahrawis, and virtually all northern tribes had members on both sides of the (former) frontier, many of whom sympathized with the Polisario's demands for independence.

In addition to the government's support for guerrillas in northern Mauritania, several thousand Mauritanians left the country to join the Polisario in its Tindouf camps. Further dissatisfaction arose in the South, from where Black troops were sent to fight what they regarded as an essentially inter-Arab conflict, and one which could, if successful, entrench Moktar's discriminatory rule even further by the addition of several thousand new Moorish citizens. But Moktar additionally sought the territory in order to prevent it from falling into Moroccan hands, still wary of the officially defunct Moroccan territorial demands on Mauritania.

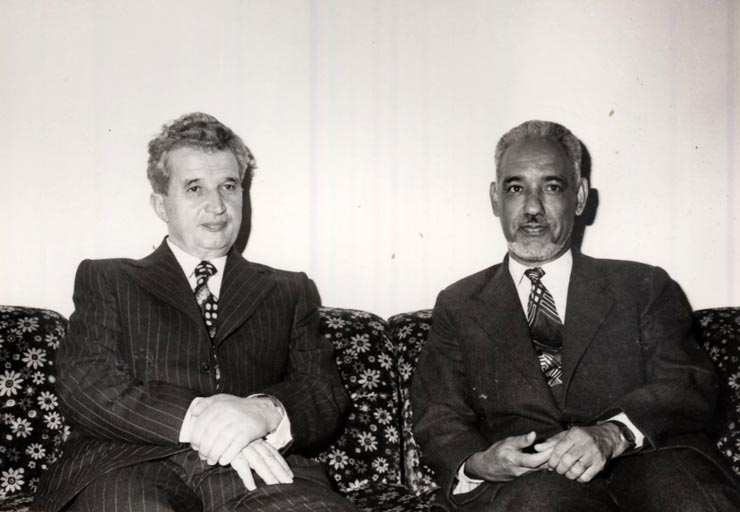
Moktar and Romanian leader Nicolae Ceaucescu in 1977

Following the Madrid Accords with Spain, Mauritania annexed a southern portion of the territory, renaming it Tiris al-Gharbiya. However, the small and poorly trained Mauritanian Army failed to stop the guerilla incursions, despite backing from the French Air Force. Polisario then turned to attacking the iron mines in Zouerate, at which point the country's economy started backsliding, and Moktar's public support tumbled. In 1976, the capital Nouakchott was attacked by the Polisario Front, and Moktar was forced to appoint a military officer to head the Ministry of defense.

== Downfall and later life ==
On 10 July 1978, Lt. Col. Mustafa Ould Salek overthrew Moktar in a military coup, and installed a junta to rule the country in his place. His successors would surrender Mauritania's claims to Western Sahara and completely withdraw from the war the following year (August 1979).

After a period of imprisonment, Moktar was allowed to go into exile in France in August 1979, where he organized an opposition group, the Alliance pour une Mauritanie Democratique (AMD) in 1980. Attempts to overthrow the regime from abroad were unsuccessful.

In 1985, Gabonese President Omar Bongo donated a duplex in Nice, France, where Daddah lived in exile with his wife and children.

Moktar was allowed to return to Mauritania on 17 July 2001, but died soon after at a military hospital, following a long illness, in Paris, France on 14 October 2003. His body was subsequently flown back to Mauritania, where it is buried at the El Balatiya cemetery near Boutilimit. His widow, former First Lady Mariem Daddah, died on 12 February 2023 and was buried with him at the El Balatiya cemetery.

== Honours ==
=== Foreign honours ===
- Yugoslavia: Order of the Yugoslav Great Star (5 September 1968).
- Empire of Iran : Commemorative Medal of the 2500th Anniversary of the founding of the Persian Empire (14 October 1971).
