= Ministry of Foreign Affairs (Mauritania) =

Coordinates: 18°6′49″N 15°59′25″W

Agency overview
- Headquarters: Nouakchott
- Minister responsible: Mohamed Salem Ould Merzoug

The Ministry of Foreign Affairs is the national ministry of foreign affairs of Mauritania. It has its headquarters in Nouakchott, just to the northwest of the Nouakchott Convention Center complex.

== List of ministers ==
This is a list of ministers of foreign affairs of Mauritania:

- 1960–1962: Moktar Ould Daddah
- 1962–1963: Cheikhna Ould Mohamed Laghdaf
- 1963–1965: Mohamed Ould Dayin
- 1965: Moktar Ould Daddah
- 1965–1966: Mohamed Ould Cheikh
- 1966: Malum Ould Braham
- 1966–1968: Wane Birane Mamadou
- 1968–1970: Hamdi Ould Mouknass
- 1970–1971: Mohamed Moktar Ould Cheikh Abdellahi
- 1971–1978: Hamdi Ould Mouknass
- 1978–1979: Cheikhna Ould Mohamed Laghdaf
- 1979–1980: Ahmedou Ould-Abdallah
- 1980–1981: Mohamed Moktar Ould Zamil
- 1981: Dahane Ould Ahmed Mahmoud
- 1981–1984: Ahmed Ould Minnih
- 1984: Cheikh Sid'Ahmed Ould Babamine
- 1984–1986: Ahmed Ould Minnih
- 1986–1988: Mohamed Lemine Ould N'Diayane
- 1988–1989: Mohamed Sidina Ould Sidiya
- 1989–1990: Cheikh Sid'Ahmed Ould Baba
- 1990–1992: Hasni Ould Didi
- 1992: Ismael Ould Yahi
- 1992–1993: Mohamed Abderrahmane Ould Moine
- 1993–1996: Mohamed Salem Ould Lekhal
- 1996–1997: Lemrabott Sidi Mahmoud Ould Cheikh Ahmed
- 1997: Ahmed Sidi Ould Khalifa
- 1997: Abdallahi Ould Nem
- 1997: Sow Abou Demba
- 1997–1998: Mohamed El Hacen Ould Lebatt
- 1998: Cheikh El Avia Ould Mohamed Khouna
- 1998–2001: Ahmed Ould Sid'Ahmed
- 2001–2002: Dah Ould Abdi
- 2002–2003: Mohamed Ould Tolba
- 2003–2005: Mohamed Vall Ould Bellal
- 2005–2007: Ahmed Ould Sid'Ahmed
- 2007–2008: Mohamed Saleck Ould Mohamed Lemine
- 2008: Cheikh El Avia Ould Mohamed Khouna
- 2008: Abdallahi Hassen Ben Hmeida
- 2008–2009: Mohamed Mahmoud Ould Mohamedou
- 2009–2011: Naha Mint Mouknass
- 2011–2013: Hamadi Ould Baba Ould Hamadi
- 2013–2015: Ahmed Ould Teguedi
- 2015: Vatma Vall Mint Soueina
- 2015–2016: Hamadi Ould Meimou
- 2016–2018: Isselkou Ould Ahmed Izid Bih
- 2018–2022: Ismail Ould Cheikh Ahmed
- 2022–present: Mohamed Salem Ould Merzoug.
