= Mauritania–Niger relations =

- Mauritania: Niger

Mauritania–Niger relations refer to foreign relations between the Islamic Republic of Mauritania and the Republic of Niger. Mauritania maintains a consulate-general in Niamey, but Niger has no diplomatic representation in Mauritania and diplomatic relations between the two nations are very limited.

On August 20, 2013, the Nigerien and Mauritanian governments signed a military defense pact. Both nations' Foreign Ministers praised each other's action against terror in the Sahel, and vowed to strengthen relations between the two countries, as they have the same goals on regional and subregional levels. Mauritanian Foreign Minister Hamady Ould Hamady is quoted as saying during the two-day conference held in Nouakchott that Mauritania and Niger are, "two brother countries united by a strong fabric of historical, cultural, sociological, geographical and security relations."

== See also ==
- Foreign relations of Mauritania
- Foreign relations of Niger
