= Azerbaijan–Mauritania relations =

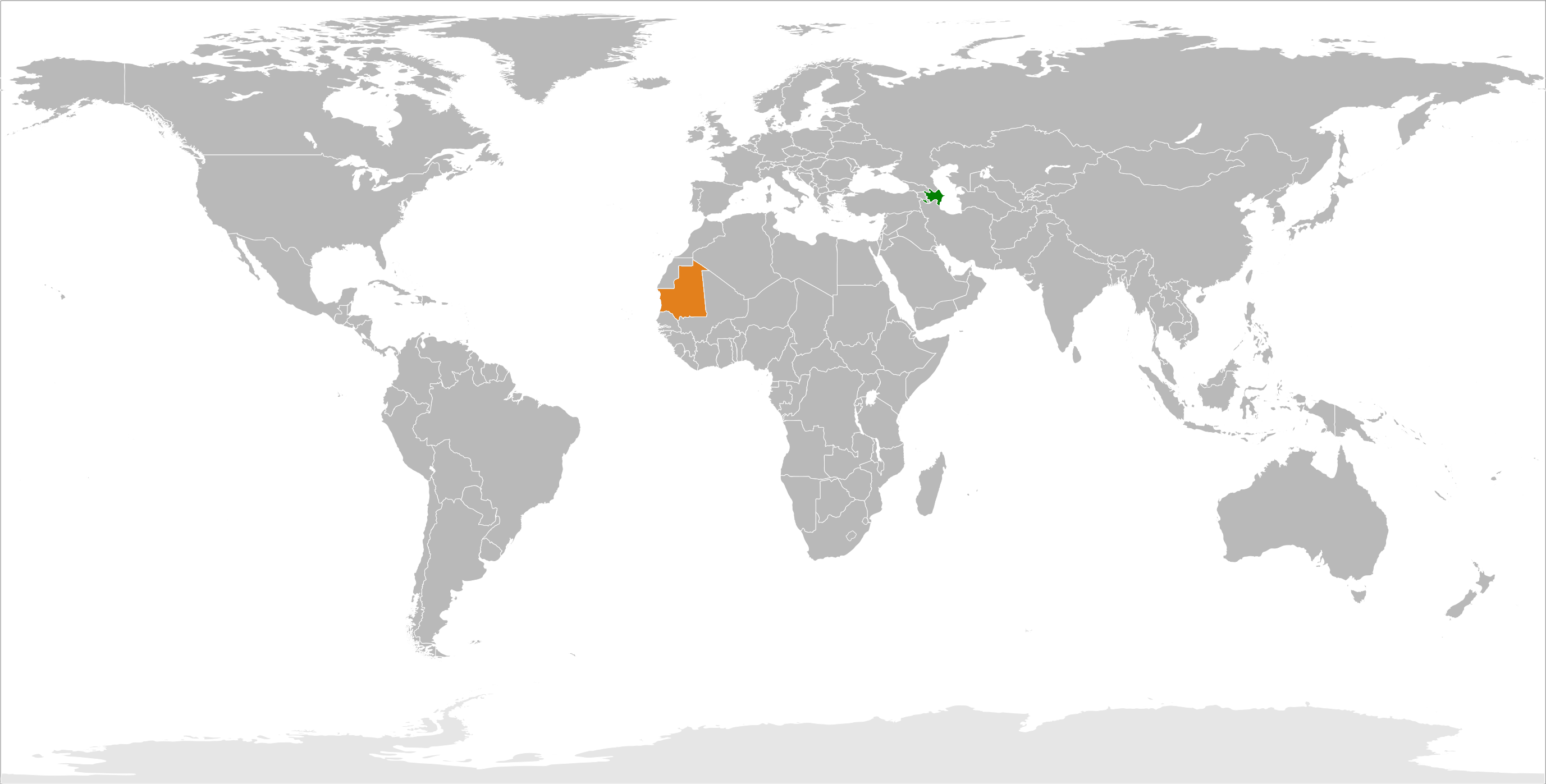

- Azerbaijan: Mauritania

Bilateral relations exist between the Republic of Azerbaijan and the Islamic Republic of Mauritania in the political, socio-economic, cultural and other spheres.

== Diplomatic relations ==
Full diplomatic relations between Azerbaijan and Mauritania were established on October 29, 1994.

The Ambassador of Azerbaijan to Mauritania is Ogtay Gurbanov. The representative of Mauritania in Azerbaijan is Mohamed Ould Taleb Amar.

Milli Majlis (National Assembly) of Azerbaijan has a working group on inter-parliamentary relations between Azerbaijan and Mauritania. The head of the group is Shahin Seyidzadeh.

On October 13–15, 2009, a delegation led by the Minister of Culture, Youth and Sports of Mauritania, Cisse Mint Sheikh Ould Boyden, visited Azerbaijan to participate in the VI conference of Ministers of Culture of the OIC member states held in Baku.

In April 2010, the Minister of Foreign Affairs and International Cooperation of Mauritania, Naha Mint Muknass, paid an official visit to Azerbaijan. Prospects for cooperation in such areas as agriculture, education, the oil sector, the economy, and the military were discussed. The following documents were signed during the visit:

1. Protocol on cooperation between the Ministry of Foreign Affairs of Azerbaijan and the Ministry of Foreign Affairs of Mauritania
2. Memorandum of understanding in the field of culture between the Government of Azerbaijan and the Government of Mauritania

In July 2010, then President of Mauritania Mohamed Ould Abdel Aziz paid an official visit to Azerbaijan. As a result of the visit, 7 documents were signed.

In March 2018 the President of Mauritania, Amina Gurab Fakim paid an official visit to Azerbaijan.

== Economic cooperation ==
In 2009, the volume of exports from Mauritania amounted to 127.9 thousand US dollars.

== International cooperation ==
In the international arena, cooperation between countries is carried out within the framework of various international organizations: OIC, ISESCO, UN, etc.

In 2006 and 2009, Mauritania supported Azerbaijan's candidacy for the UN Human Rights Council.

Mauritania also supported Azerbaijan's candidacy as a non-permanent member of the UN Security Council for the 2012–2013 term.

== Humanitarian assistance ==
According to the order of the Cabinet of Ministers of Azerbaijan No. 284 of September 26, 2007, humanitarian and financial assistance in the amount of 20,000 US dollars was provided to Mauritania to repair the damage caused by heavy downpours in the country.

== See also ==
- Foreign relations of Azerbaijan
- Foreign relations of Mauritania
