= Ahmed Ould Sid'Ahmed =

Mauritanian diplomat

Minister for Foreign Affairs and Cooperation
- In office 10 August 2005 – 28 April 2007
- President: Ely Ould Mohamed Vall
- Prime Minister: Sidi Mohamed Ould Boubacar
- Preceded by: Mohamed Vall Ould Bellal
- Succeeded by: Mohamed Saleck Ould Mohamed Lemine
- In office 17 November 1998 – 28 January 2001
- President: Maaouya Ould Sid'Ahmed Taya
- Prime Minister: Cheikh El Avia Ould Mohamed Khouna
- Preceded by: Cheikh El Avia Ould Mohamed Khouna
- Succeeded by: Dah Ould Abdi

Personal details
- Born: August 11, 1949 (age 77) Tidjikja, Colony of Mauritania
- Profession: Politician, Diplomat

Ahmed Ould Sid'Ahmed (born August 11, 1949) is a Mauritanian diplomat and politician who has twice served as Foreign Minister, from 1998 to 2001, and from 2005 to 2007.

== Biography ==
Ould Sid'Ahmed was born in Tidjikja. He served in the Mauritanian Foreign ministry as assistant director of cooperation from August 1973 to March 1975, was an advisor to Mauritania's Permanent mission to the United Nations from March 1975 to October 1982, and was the Foreign ministry's director of international organizations from October 1982 to February 1988. He was then Ambassador to Egypt from February 1988 to June 1990 and Secretary of State in charge of the Arab Maghreb from June 1990 to April 1992. A succession of diplomatic posts followed: Ambassador to Senegal from June 1992 to August 1993, Ambassador in Belgium, the Netherlands, and Luxembourg, and representative to the European Union from August 1993 to April 1996, Permanent Representative to the United Nations from 1996 to 1997, Ambassador to the United States from May 1997 to November 1998.

On November 17, 1998, Ould Sid'Ahmed became Minister of Foreign Affairs. During his time as Foreign Minister, he led Mauritania's normalization of relations with Israel in 1999. He served as Foreign Minister until Dah Ould Abdi was appointed to replace him on January 28, 2001. He subsequently served as Ambassador to Syria from November 2003 to August 2005.

Following a military coup (August 2005), he was again appointed Foreign minister on 10 August 2005 as part of the new government, and served in that position until a new government was named on 28 April 2007, following elections and the restoration of civilian rule.
