= Ahmed Ould Teguedi =

Mauritanian diplomat

- أحمد ولد تكدي
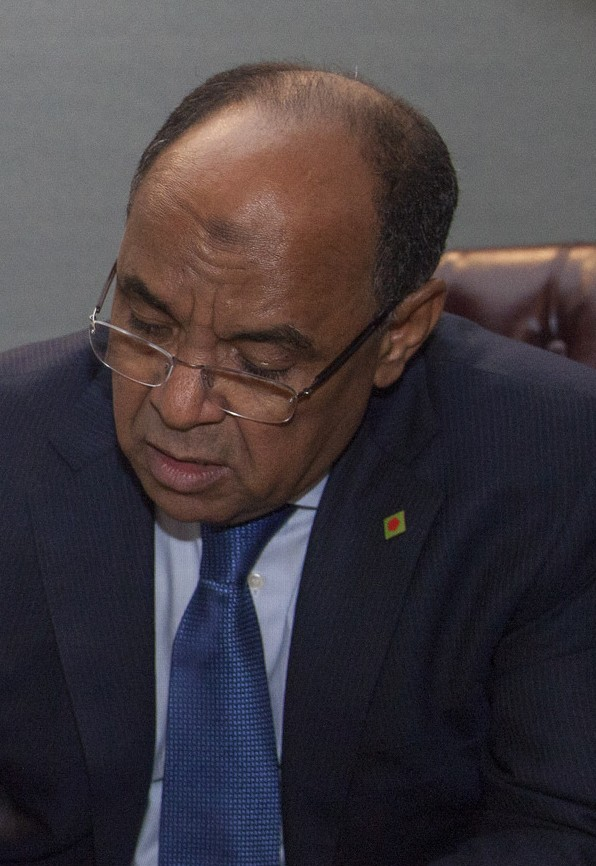

Minister for Foreign Affairs and Cooperation
- In office 18 September 2013 – 30 January 2015
- President: Mohamed Ould Abdel Aziz
- Prime Minister: Moulaye Ould Mohamed Laghdaf
- Preceded by: Hamadi Ould Baba Ould Hamadi
- Succeeded by: Vatma Vall Mint Soueina

Mauritanian Ambassador to the United Nations
- In office 18 January 2012 – 18 September 2013
- President: Mohamed Ould Abdel Aziz
- Prime Minister: Moulaye Ould Mohamed Laghdaf

Mauritanian Ambassador to Israel
- In office 1999–2009

Personal details
- Born: 1954 (age 71–72) Chinguetti, Colony of Mauritania
- Education: Bucharest Academy of Economic Studies
- Profession: Diplomat

Ahmed Ould Teguedi (Arabic: أحمد ولد تكدي; born 1954) is a Mauritanian diplomat. He was Mauritania's Minister for Foreign Affairs and Cooperation between 2013 and 2015.

== Life and career ==
Ould Teguedi was born in Chinguetti, then part of the French Colony of Mauritania. He studied at the Academy of Economic Studies in Bucharest, Romania, from where he received a master's degree in economic planning and cybernetics.

Ould Teguedi has a long career in Mauritania's Ministry of Foreign Affairs and Cooperation, having joined the Ministry in 1981. After joining the Ministry, he headed Mauritania's Western Europe, Eastern Europe, Americas and European Economic Community/African-Caribbean-Pacific Divisions.

Later, from 1987 to 1988, he served as Second Counsellor in Washington D.C., where he was also in charge of Mauritania's relations with the World Bank and the International Monetary Fund.

In August 1988 he was appointed Mauritania's First Counsellor in Egypt from August 1988, a position he held until December 1990. He also gained an appointment as Chargé d'affaires in August 1990.

He held the position of Mauritania's Chargé d'affaires in Yemen between 1991 and 1993, following which he became the First Counsellor and Chargé d'affaires at Mauritania's Embassy in Morocco from 1993 to 1995.

He then became Head of the office responsible for Mauritanian interests in Tel Aviv between 1995 and 1999, and later served as Mauritania's Ambassador to Israel from 1999 to 2009.

In January 2012 he became Mauritania's Ambassador to the United Nations, and served in this capacity until 18 September 2013, when he was appointed Mauritania's Foreign Minister in a cabinet reshuffle, he occupied this function until 2015.
