= Mohamed Saleck Ould Mohamed Lemine =

Mauritanian politician (born 1963)

Minister for Foreign Affairs and Cooperation
- In office 28 April 2007 – 6 May 2008
- President: Sidi Ould Cheikh Abdallahi
- Prime Minister: Zeine Ould Zeidane
- Preceded by: Ahmed Ould Sid'Ahmed
- Succeeded by: Abdallahi Hassen Ben Hmeida

Personal details
- Born: 1963 (age 62–63) Kiffa, Mauritania
- Education: National School for Administration
- Profession: Politician, Diplomat

Mohamed Saleck Ould Mohamed Lemine (born in 1963) is a Mauritanian politician and diplomat. A former ambassador to Switzerland, Lemine was named on 28 April 2007 to the post of Foreign Minister in the new government under Prime Minister Zeine Ould Zeidane and President Sidi Ould Cheikh Abdallahi.

Ould Mohamed Lemine was born in Kiffa. He joined the Ministry of Foreign Affairs and Cooperation on August 1, 1984. He served in a number of positions, including first Advisor of Mauritania's Permanent Mission to the United Nations from February 1992 to January 1996 and Consul-General in the Canary Islands from February 1996 to August 1997.

In September 1997 he became Ambassador and Permanent Representative to the Office of the United Nations and the International Organizations in Geneva, Switzerland, and in November 2006 he became Ambassador to Switzerland.

In Parliament on 7 July 2007, Lemine denied all accusations that there were U.S. prisons, secret military bases or training camps in Mauritania, responding to concerns from deputies. The claims about the existence of these facilities were first published by The New Yorker in June; Lemine described the claims as "false rumors".
