= Mauritanian passport =

Passport issued to citizens of Mauritania

Mauritanian passport جواز سفر موريتاني (Note: Arabic) Passeport mauritanien (Note: French)
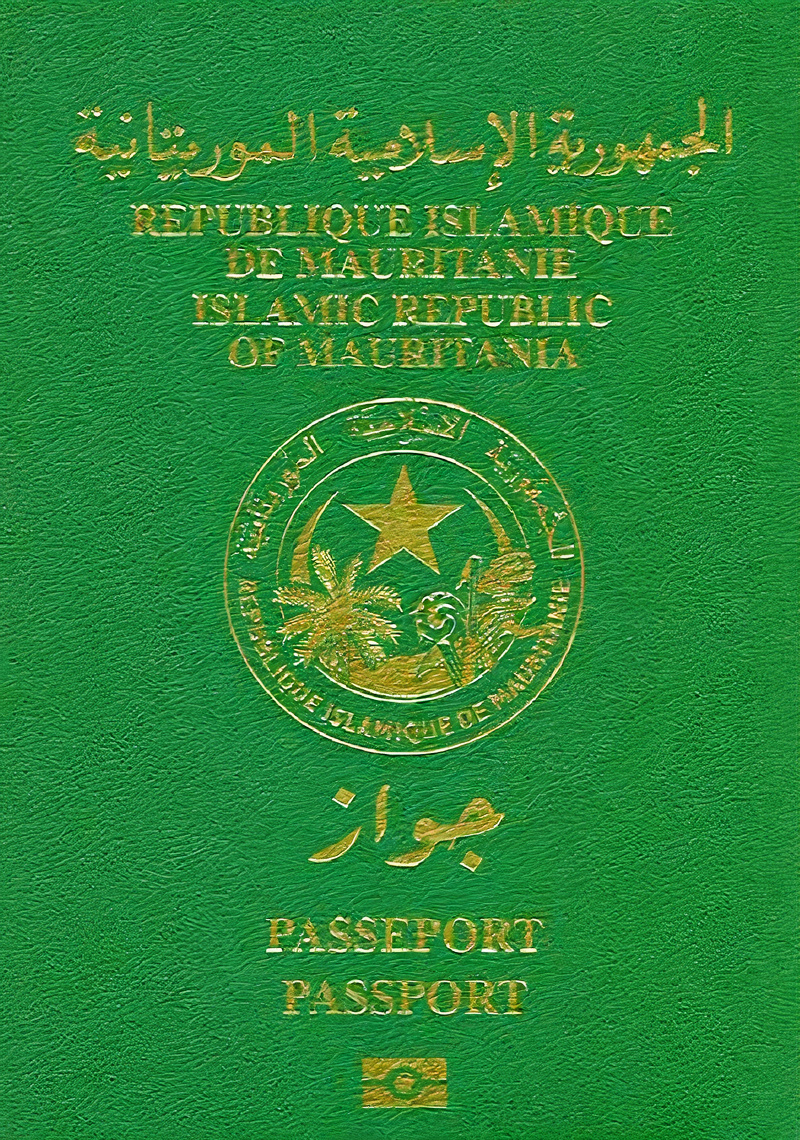
- The front cover of a contemporary Mauritanian Biometric passport (with chip)

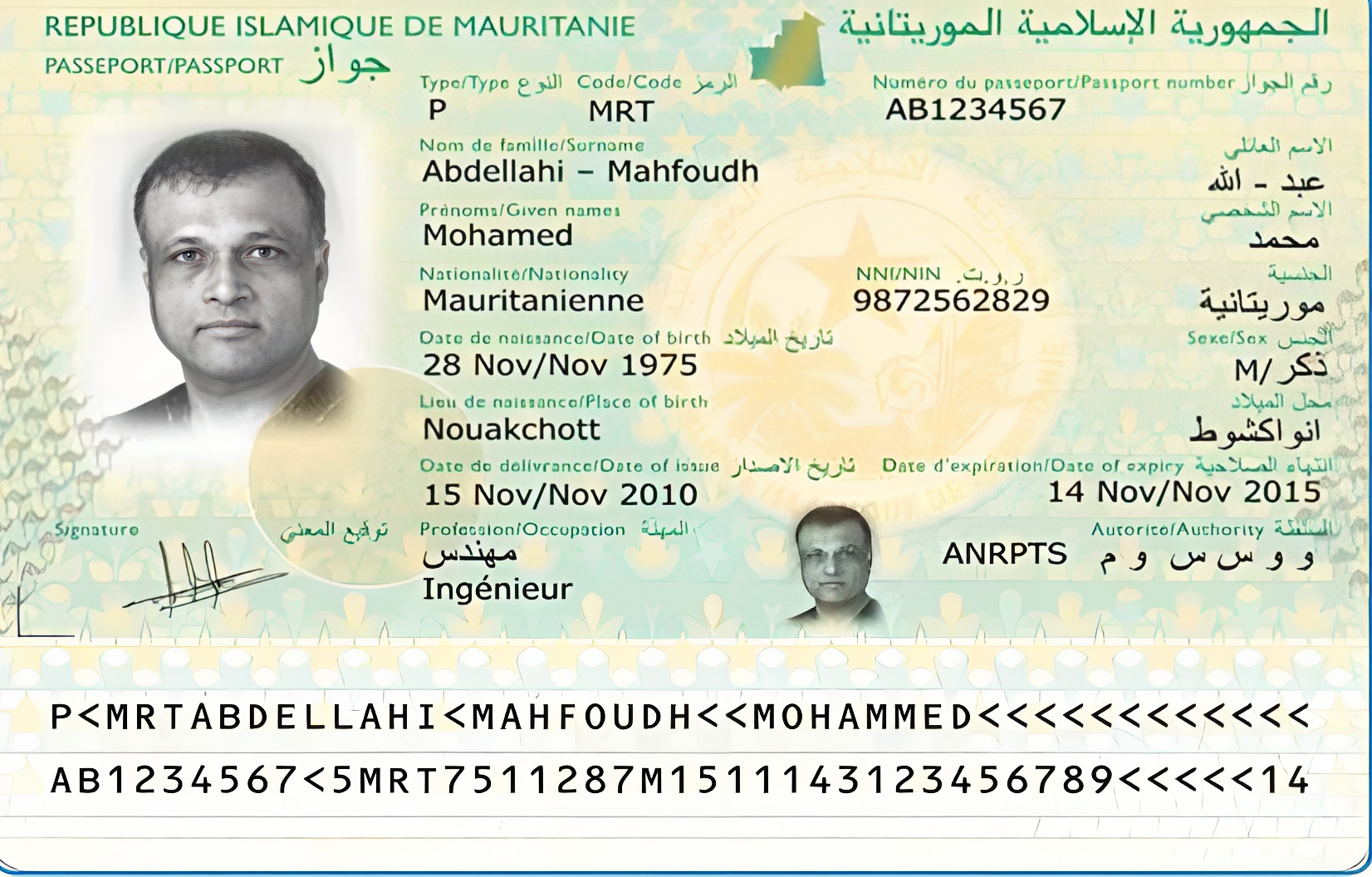
- Biographical data page of a contemporary Mauritanian biometric passport
- Type: Passport
- Issued by: Mauritania
- First issued: 1 January 2013 (Biometric Passport)
- Purpose: Identification, International Travel
- Valid in: All countries
- Eligibility: Mauritanian citizenship
- Expiration: Adult: 5 years (18 years+); Child: 3 years (18 years and under)
- Cost: Adult: 12,000.00UM (5 years of validity); Child: Unknown

The Mauritanian passport (Arabic: جواز سفر موريتاني; French: Passeport mauritanien) is an official travel document issued by the Agence Nationale Du Registre Des Populations Et Des Titres Sécurisés ("ANRPTS "). (English: National Agency for the Registry of Populations and Secure Titles). That grants citizens of Mauritania for international travel in accordance with visa requirements. It serves to provide identification and citizenship verification, allowing holders to travel worldwide and seek entry into other countries.

== Appearance ==
The ordinary passport of a Mauritanian citizen is light green in colour. In the centre of the cover is the country's coat of arms. The PASSPORT and ISLAMIC REPUBLIC OF MAURITANIA are written in English, French and Arabic.

=== Information page ===
The Information Page (2-3) of the passport of a Mauritanian citizen contains the following data:

- Photo of the holder 35x45 mm
- Type ("P" for "personal")
- Country code: MRT
- Passport number: Includes a total of 9 digits (ABXXXXXXX)
- Surname
- Given names
- Nationality: Mauritanienne
- NNI/NIN (National identification number)
- Date of Birth (Date Format: DD MMM/MMM YYYY; with months abbreviated)
- Sex of Bearer
- Place of Birth
- Date of Issue
- Date of Expiry
- Occupation of Bearer
- Authority: "A N R P T S" (Agence Nationale Du Registre Des Populations Et Des Titres Sécurisés)
- Signature of Bearer
- Machine Readable Zone ("MRZ")

The information page is also written in English, French and Arabic.

=== Visa Page ===
The visa page of the Mauritanian Passport, includes the word "Visa" both written in both Arabic and English. It contains the Seal of Mauritania and a star at the middle of the page. With the page numbers having the outline of Mauritania behind it. At the bottom of the page, it illustrates the Presidential Palace located in Nouakchott, Mauritania.

== See also ==
- Visa requirements for Mauritanian citizens
- Mauritania Nationality Law
- List of passports
