= List of diplomatic missions in Mauritania =

This is a list of diplomatic missions in Mauritania. There are currently 36 embassies in Nouakchott.

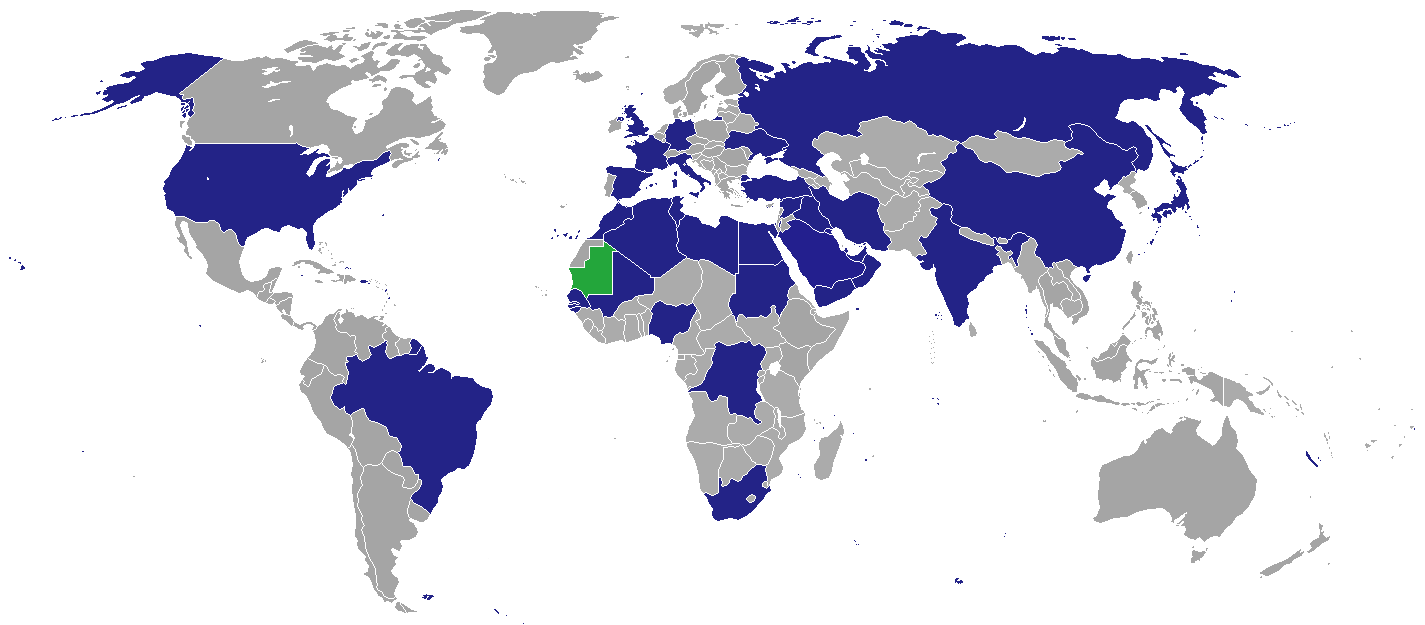
Map of diplomatic missions in Mauritania

== Diplomatic missions in Nouakchott ==
=== Embassies ===
1. Algeria
2. Brazil
3. China
4. Congo-Kinshasa
5. Egypt
6. France
7. Gambia
8. Germany
9. Guinea-Bissau
10. India
11. Iran
12. Iraq
13. Italy
14. Japan
15. Kuwait
16. Libya
17. Mali
18. Morocco
19. Nigeria
20. Oman
21. Palestine
22. Qatar
23. Russia
24. Saudi Arabia
25. Senegal
26. South Africa
27. Spain
28. Sudan
29. Syria
30. Tunisia
31. Turkey
32. Ukraine
33. United Arab Emirates
34. United Kingdom
35. United States
36. Yemen

=== Other posts ===
- European Union (Delegation)

== Consulates-General ==
=== Nouadhibou ===
- Algeria
- Morocco
- Spain

== Non-resident embassies ==
If not mentioned, then the residence is in Rabat.

1. Albania (Madrid)
2. Angola (Dakar)
3. Argentina (Tunis)
4. Australia (Paris)
5. Austria
6. Azerbaijan
7. Bangladesh (Algiers)
8. Barbados (Dublin)
9. Belgium
10. Cameroon (Dakar)
11. Canada
12. Chile (Algiers)
13. Colombia (Dakar)
14. Croatia
15. Cuba (Algiers)
16. Cyprus (Tripoli)
17. Czechia
18. Denmark
19. Finland
20. Greece
21. Haiti (Paris)
22. Indonesia
23. Ireland
24. Jamaica (Paris)
25. Jordan
26. Kenya (Dakar)
27. Kyrgyzstan (London)
28. Lesotho (Tripoli)
29. Luxembourg (Dakar)
30. Malaysia
31. Maldives (London)
32. Malta (Valletta)
33. Mexico (Algiers)
34. Netherlands (Dakar)
35. New Zealand (Paris)
36. North Korea (Abuja)
37. Norway
38. Pakistan
39. Philippines
40. Poland
41. Portugal (Dakar)
42. Romania (Dakar)
43. Rwanda
44. Serbia (New York City)
45. Seychelles (Addis Ababa)
46. Slovakia (Algiers)
47. Somalia (Algiers)
48. South Korea
49. Sweden (Bamako)
50. Switzerland (Dakar)
51. Taiwan (Paris)
52. Tanzania (Abuja)
53. Thailand
54. Turkmenistan (Paris)
55. Uzbekistan (Paris)
56. Venezuela
57. Vietnam
58. Zambia (Abuja)

== Former Embassies ==
- Israel (closed in 2009)
- South Korea (closed in 1993)

== See also ==
- Foreign relations of Mauritania
- List of diplomatic missions of Mauritania
