= List of diplomatic missions of Mauritania =

This is a list of diplomatic missions of Mauritania

Honorary consulates and trade missions are excluded from this listing.

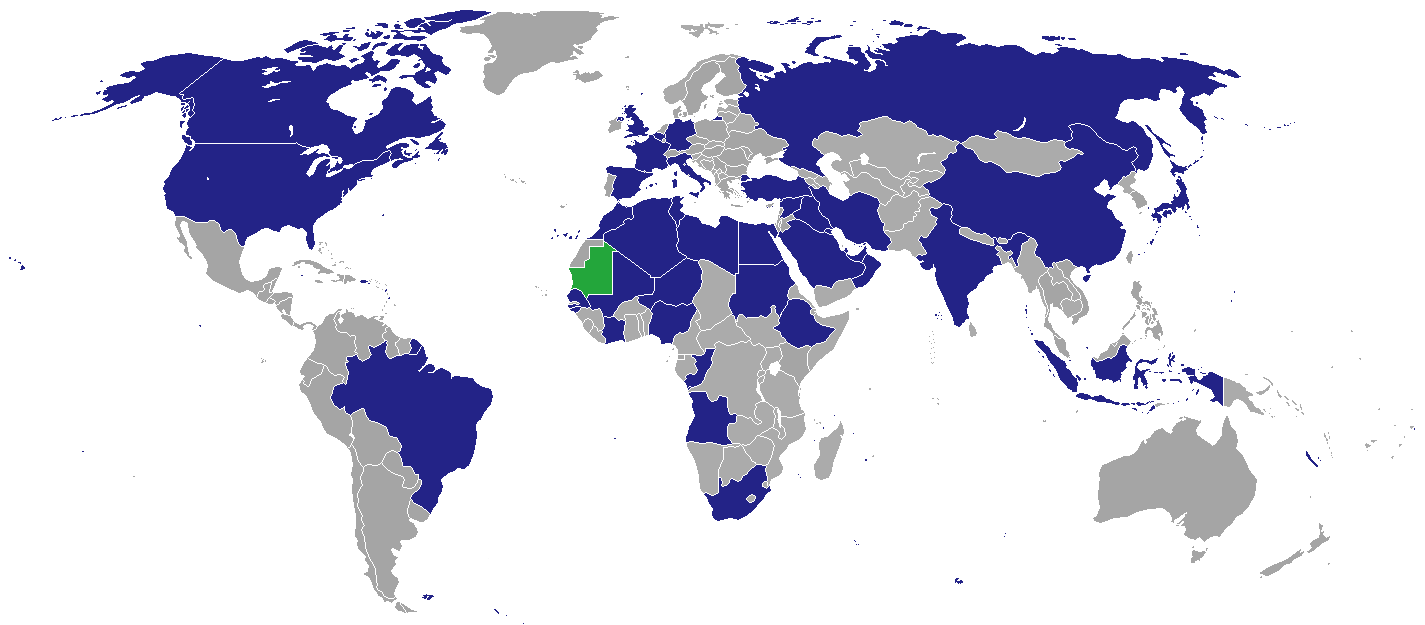
Map of Mauritanian diplomatic missions

== Current missions ==
=== Africa ===
Host country	Host city	Mission	Concurrent accreditation	Ref.
Algeria	Algiers	Embassy		
Angola	Luanda	Embassy	Countries: Equatorial Guinea; São Tomé and Príncipe; Zambia	
Congo-Brazzaville	Brazzaville	Embassy		
Egypt	Cairo	Embassy	Countries: Comoros; Djibouti; Eritrea; Somalia; International Organizations: Arab League	
Ethiopia	Addis Ababa	Embassy	Countries: Burundi; Kenya; Rwanda; South Sudan; International Organizations: African Union; United Nations Economic Commission for Africa	
Gambia	Banjul	Embassy		
Guinea-Bissau	Bissau	Embassy		
Ivory Coast	Abidjan	Embassy	Countries: Ghana; Liberia	
Libya	Tripoli	Embassy		
Mali	Bamako	Embassy	Countries: Burkina Faso	
Morocco	Rabat	Embassy		
Niger	Niamey	Embassy	Countries: Benin; Chad; Togo	
Nigeria	Abuja	Embassy	Countries: Cameroon; Congo-Kinshasa; Gabon; International Organizations: Economic Community of West African States	
Senegal	Dakar	Embassy	Countries: Cape Verde; Guinea	
South Africa	Pretoria	Embassy	Countries: Botswana; Eswatini; Lesotho; Madagascar; Malawi; Mauritius; Mozambique; Namibia; Seychelles; Zimbabwe	
Sudan	Khartoum	Embassy		
Tunisia	Tunis	Embassy		

=== Americas ===
Host country	Host city	Mission	Concurrent accreditation	Ref.
Brazil	Brasília	Embassy	Countries: Argentina; Chile; Colombia; Ecuador; Honduras; Nicaragua; Paraguay; Uruguay; Venezuela	
Canada	Ottawa	Embassy		
United States	Washington, D.C.	Embassy	Countries: Mexico	

=== Asia ===
Host country	Host city	Mission	Concurrent accreditation	Ref.
China	Beijing	Embassy	Countries: Cambodia; North Korea; Vietnam	
India	New Delhi	Embassy		
Indonesia	Jakarta	Embassy	Countries: Brunei; Malaysia; Thailand	
Iran	Tehran	Embassy		
Iraq	Baghdad	Embassy		
Japan	Tokyo	Embassy	Countries: Australia; New Zealand; Philippines; Singapore	
Kuwait	Kuwait City	Embassy		
Oman	Muscat	Embassy		
Qatar	Doha	Embassy		
Saudi Arabia	Riyadh	Embassy	Countries: Bahrain; International Organizations: Organisation of Islamic Cooperation	
Saudi Arabia	Jeddah	Consulate	Countries: Bahrain; International Organizations: Organisation of Islamic Cooperation	
South Korea	Seoul	Embassy		
Syria	Damascus	Embassy	Countries: Jordan; Lebanon	
Turkey	Ankara	Embassy	Countries: Georgia; Kyrgyzstan	
United Arab Emirates	Abu Dhabi	Embassy	Countries: Bangladesh; Sri Lanka	

=== Europe ===
Host country	Host city	Mission	Concurrent accreditation	Ref.
Belgium	Brussels	Embassy	Countries: Finland; Denmark; Iceland; Luxembourg; Netherlands; Norway; Sweden; International Organizations: European Union; NATO; Organisation for the Prohibition of Chemical Weapons	
France	Paris	Embassy	Countries: Andorra; Holy See; Monaco; Portugal	
Germany	Berlin	Embassy	Countries: Austria; Bulgaria; Czechia; Estonia; Hungary; Latvia; Lithuania; Poland; Romania; Slovakia; Ukraine	
Italy	Rome	Embassy	Countries: Albania; Bosnia and Herzegovina; Croatia; Cyprus; Greece; Kosovo; Malta; Montenegro; San Marino; Serbia; Slovenia; International Organizations: Food and Agriculture Organization; International Fund for Agricultural Development; World Food Programme	
Russia	Moscow	Embassy	Countries: Armenia; Belarus	
Spain	Madrid	Embassy		
Spain	Las Palmas de Gran Canaria	Consulate-General		
United Kingdom	London	Embassy		

=== Multilateral organisations ===
Organization	Host city	Host country	Mission	Concurrent accreditation	Ref.
United Nations	New York City	United States	Permanent Mission	Countries: Cuba; International Organizations: International Seabed Authority	
United Nations	Geneva	Switzerland	Permanent Mission	Countries: Switzerland	
UNESCO	Paris	France	Permanent Mission	International Organizations: Francophonie	

== Gallery ==
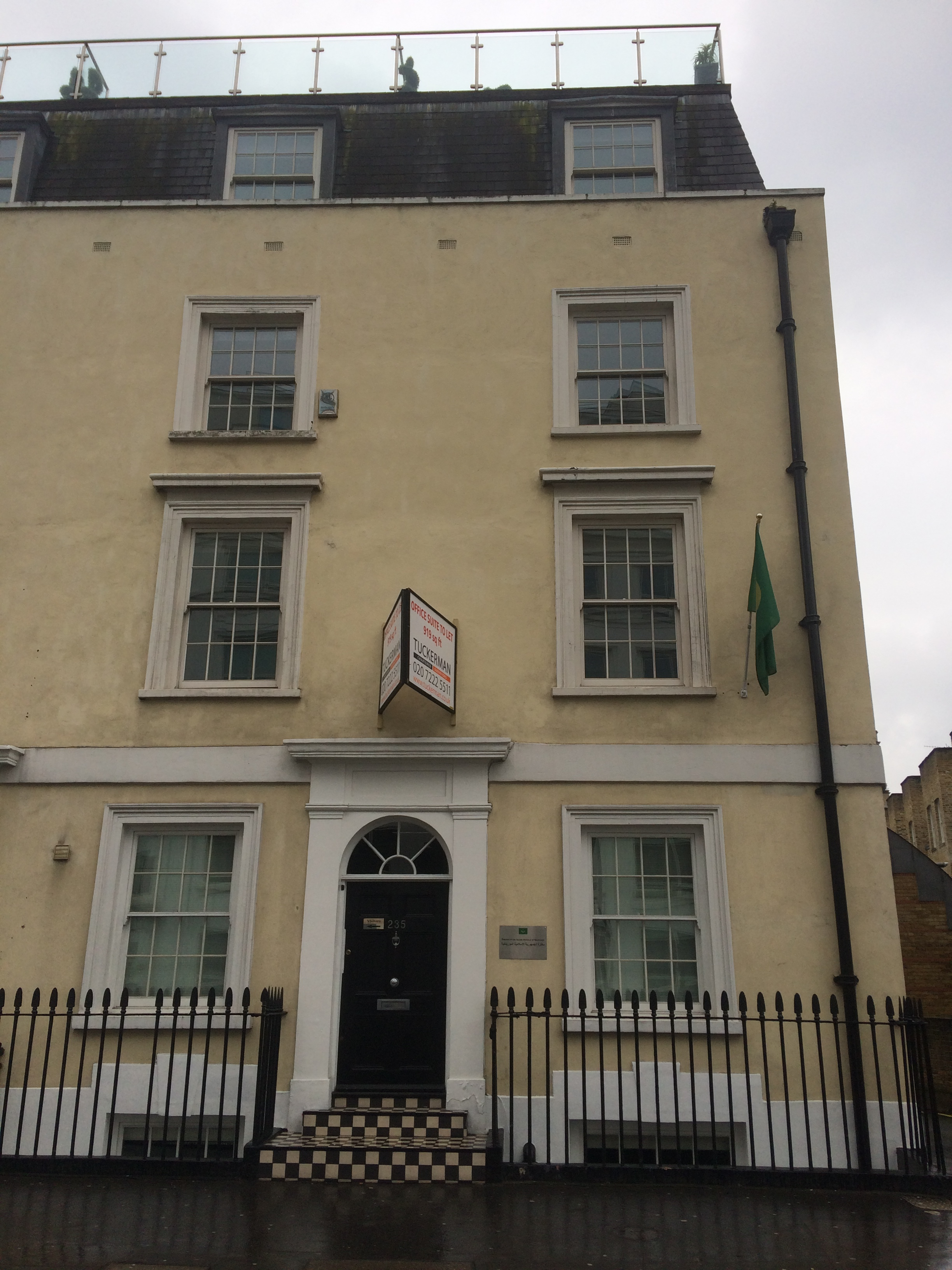
Embassy in London

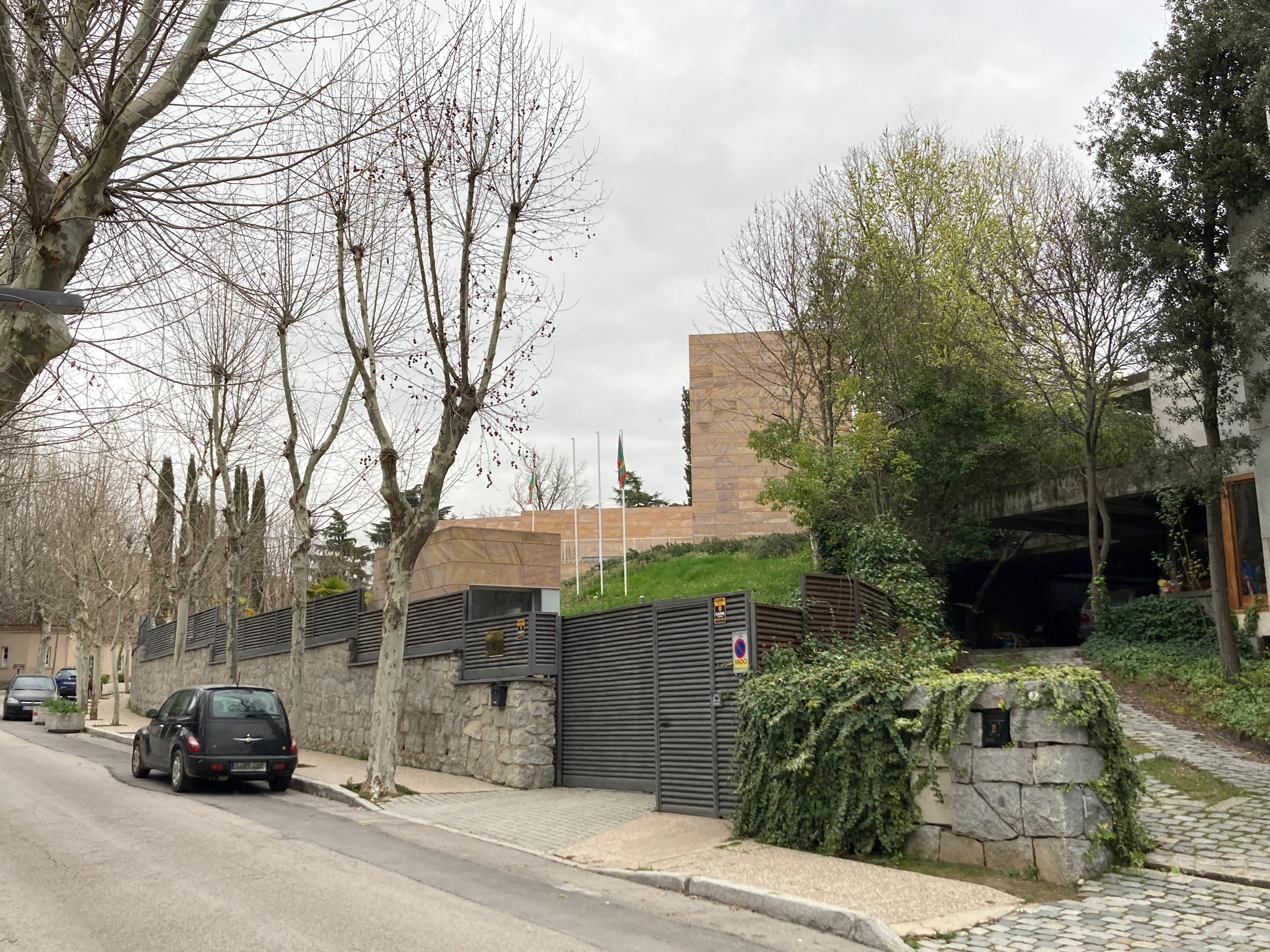
Embassy in Madrid

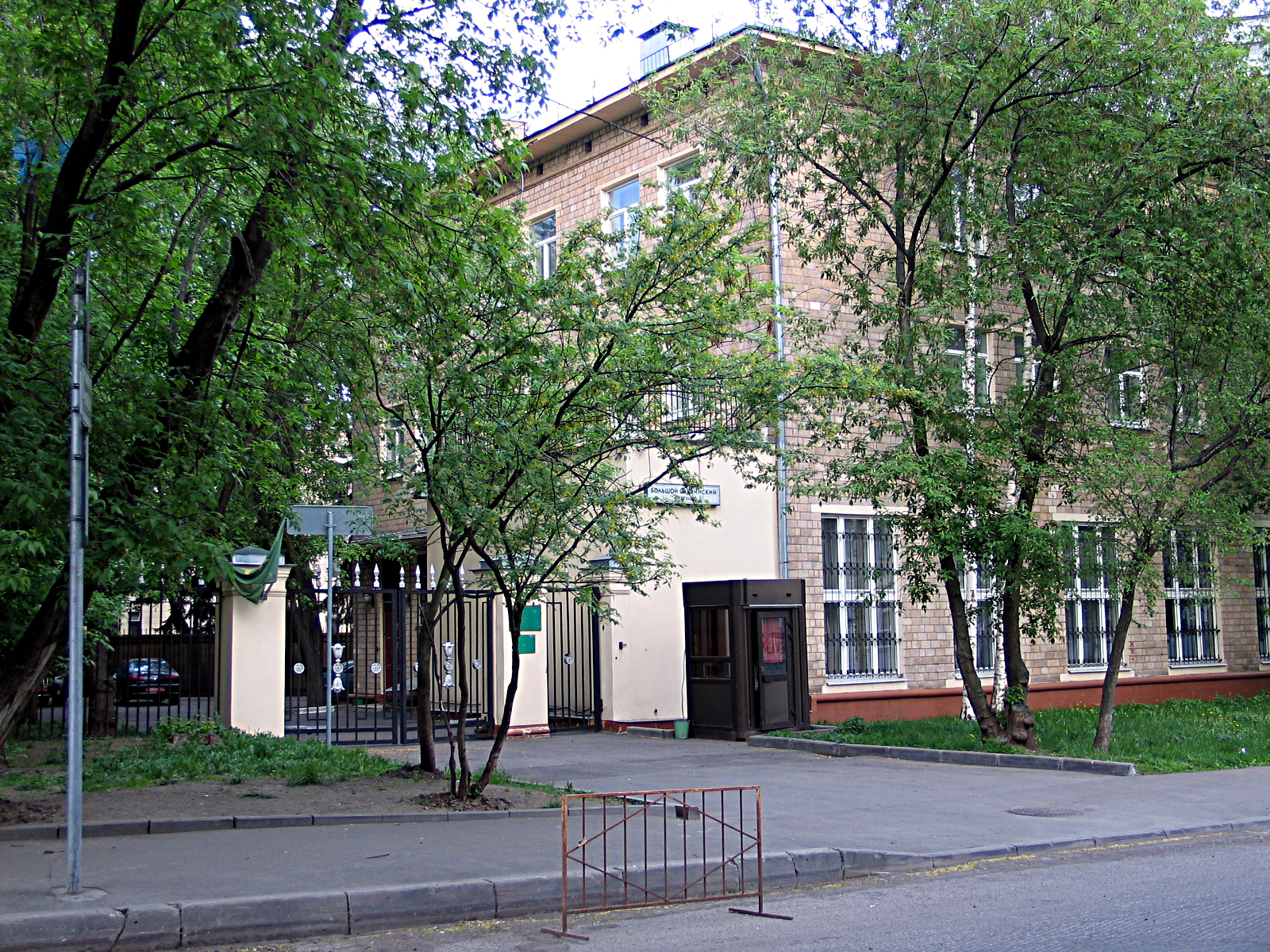
Embassy in Moscow

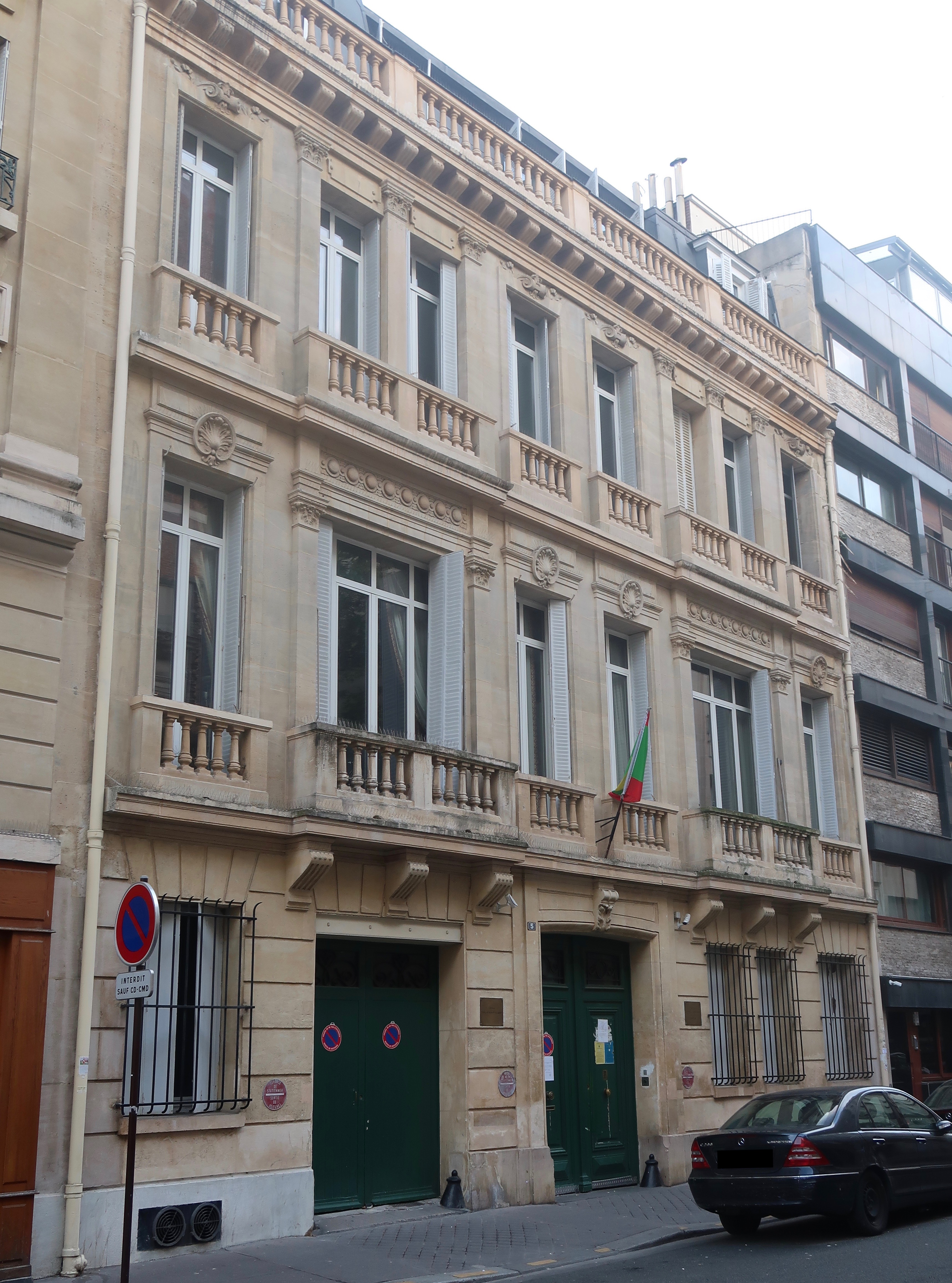
Embassy in Paris

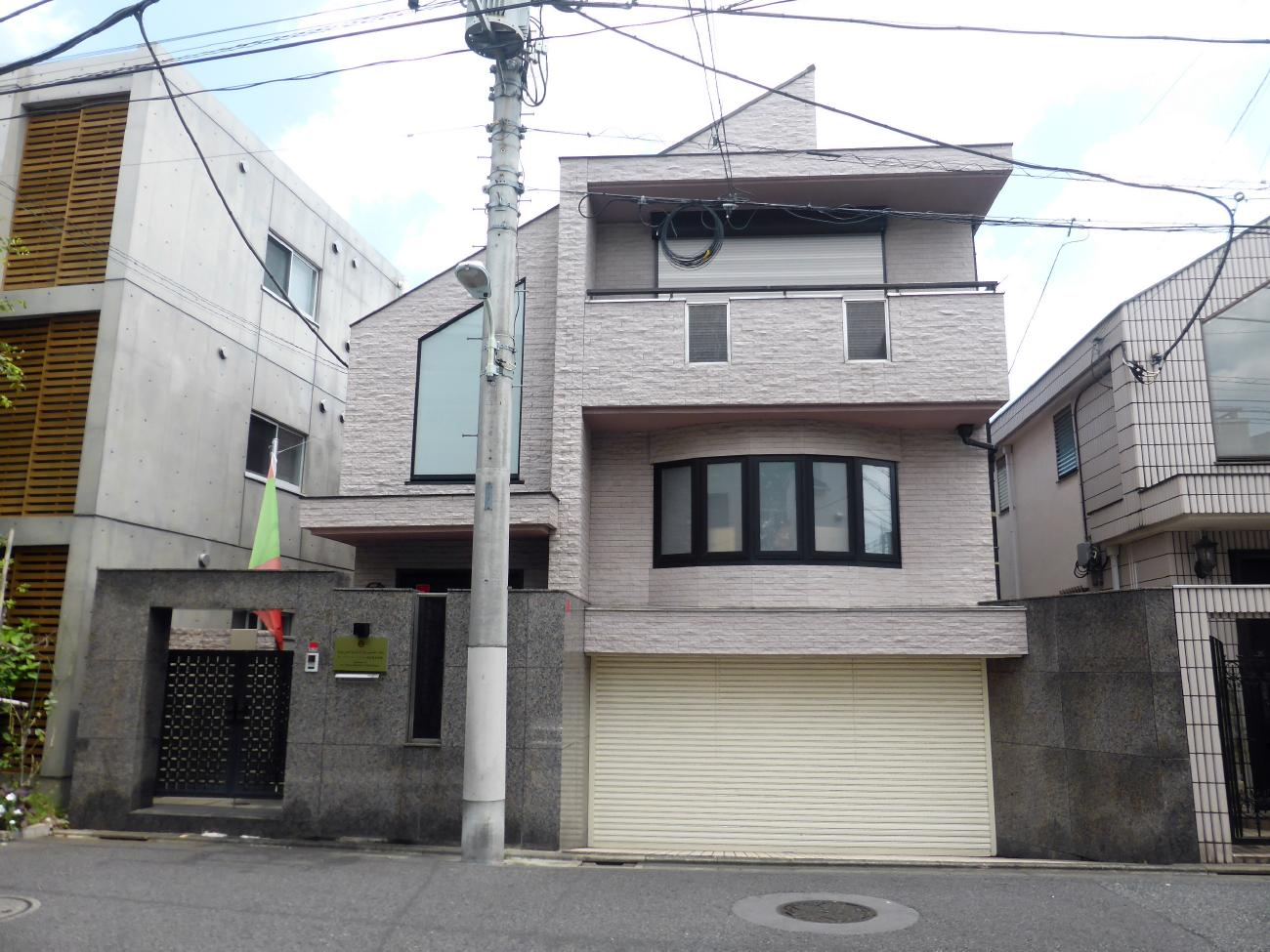
Embassy in Tokyo

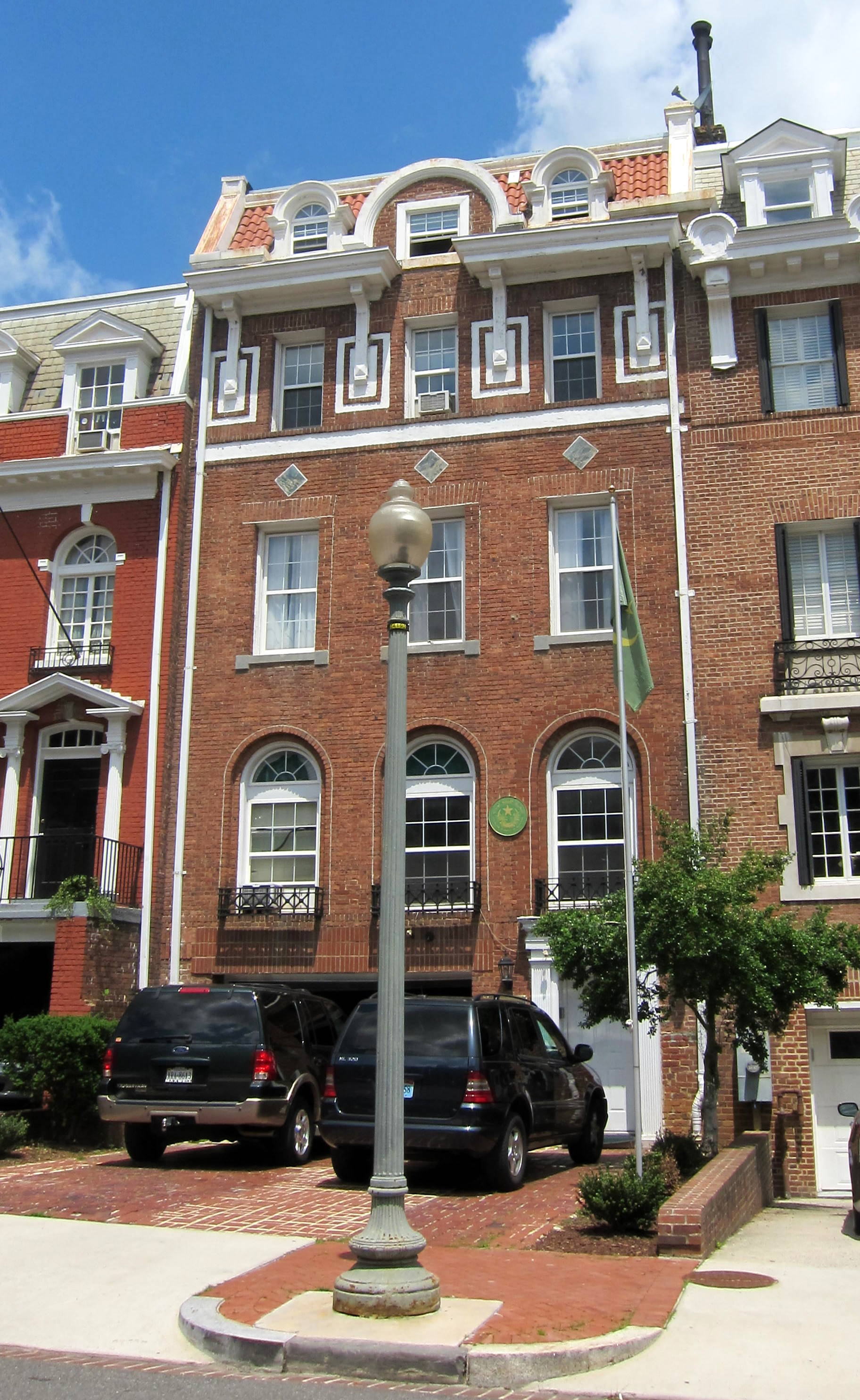
Embassy in Washington, D.C.

== Closed missions ==
=== Asia ===
Host country	Host city	Mission	Year closed	Ref.
Israel	Tel Aviv	Embassy	2009	

=== Europe ===
Host country	Host city	Mission	Year closed	Ref.
Romania	Bucharest	Embassy	Unknown	

== See also ==
- Foreign relations of Mauritania
- List of diplomatic missions in Mauritania
- Visa policy of Mauritania
