= Moudjeria =

- Commune and town
- Location in Mauritania
- Coordinates: 17°52′50″N 12°19′55″W
- Country: Mauritania
- Region: Tagant
- Elevation: 495 ft (151 m)

Population (2013 census)
  - Commune and town: 2,148
  - Metro: 41,738
- Time zone: UTC+0 (GMT)

Moudjeria is a town and commune in the Tagant Region of southern-central Mauritania, founded in 1934 as an administrative post by the French.

== Climate ==
Temperatures during the summer are among the highest in the world and can easily exceed 55 °C (131 °F).

== Transport ==
The town is served by Letfotar Airport (IATA: MOM, ICAO: GQNL).

== Notable people ==
- Hamadi Ould Baba Ould Hamadi, Mauritanian politician, was born in Moudjeria in 1948.
- Yahya Ould Ahmed El Waghef, Mauritanian politician, former Prime Minister was born in Moudjeria in 1960.
