= Visa policy of Mauritania =

Policy on permits required to enter Mauritania

Most visitors to Mauritania may obtain an electronic visa to Mauritania, unless they are a national of one of the visa-exempt countries.

== Visa exemption ==
Citizens of the following 10 countries can visit Mauritania without a visa for a stay up to 90 days:

- Algeria
- Burkina Faso
- Chad
- Côte d'Ivoire
- Gambia
- Libya
- Mali
- Niger
- Senegal
- Tunisia

Holders of diplomatic and service passports issued to nationals of Brazil, China, Egypt, Guinea-Bissau, Iran, India, Morocco, Russia, Romania, Spain, Syria, Turkey, United Arab Emirates and Yemen do not require a visa for Mauritania.

== Obtaining a visa ==
=== E-Visa ===
Mauritania launched e-Visa system in January 2025.

As of 5 January 2025, all visa required nationals will be required to apply for an e-Visa before boarding their flight to Mauritania.

As of June 2025, Mauritanian embassies no longer issue visas; they instead direct prospective applicants to obtain a e-Visa online prior to entering Mauritania.

=== Visa on arrival ===
Before 2025 holders of passports issued by any country could obtain a visa on arrival at any international airport, such as Nouakchott–Oumtounsy International Airport, as well as any land border crossing. However, according to Timatic, nationals of Syria were ineligible to obtain a visa on arrival, and had to obtain prior confirmation from the Direction General of National Security (DGSN) in order to enter Mauritania.

== See also ==
- Visa requirements for Mauritanian citizens
