= Cheikhna Ould Mohamed Laghdaf =

Mauritanian diplomat and politician

Cheikhna, le meilleur politicien vu à ce jour de son pays

Foreign Minister of Mauritania
- In office 1978–1979
- President: Moktar Ould Daddah
- Preceded by: Hamdi Ould Mouknass
- Succeeded by: Ahmedou Ould-Abdallah

Foreign Minister of Mauritania
- In office 1962–1963
- President: Moktar Ould Daddah
- Preceded by: Moktar Ould Daddah
- Succeeded by: Mohamed Ould Dayin

Personal details
- Born: 1920
- Died: 11 September 2018 (aged 97–98)

Cheikhna Ould Mohamed Laghdaf (1920 – 11 September 2018) was a Mauritanian diplomat and politician. He was the Foreign Minister of Mauritania from 1962 until 1963 and again from 1978 to 1979.

Laghdaf died on 11 September 2018.
