= Mauritania–Turkey relations =

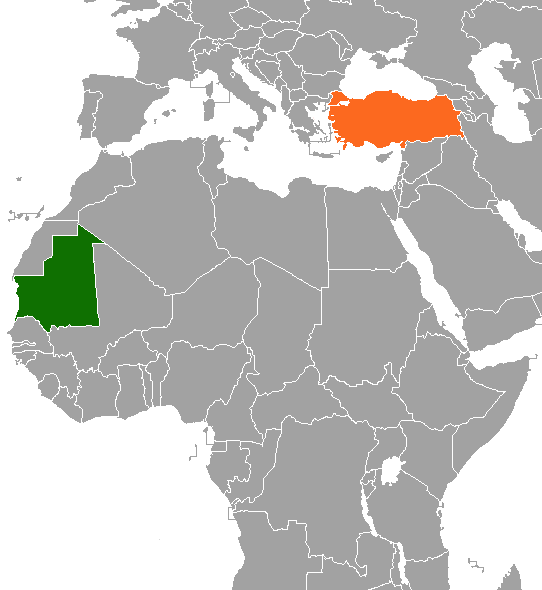
- Mauritania: Turkey

Diplomatic mission
- Embassy of Mauritania, Ankara: Embassy of Turkey, Nouakchott

Mauritania and Turkey have had diplomatic relations since the 1960s, following Mauritania's independence from France. Mauritania has an embassy in Ankara and Turkey has an embassy in Nouakchott which reopened in 2011. Turkey and Mauritania have had a good relationship based on religious and historical backgrounds, despite Mauritania never being under the Ottoman Empire.

== History ==
Throughout the 1960s, Mauritania's main pro-French foreign policy objective was preserving its independence in the face of Moroccan irredentism.

Through the early 1970s, Mauritania continued to play the role of bridge between the Maghrib and sub-Saharan Africa.

Since late 1980s, Mauritania cultivated ties with Turkey as a possible source of aid and investment. Turkey, in return, has provided it with substantial amounts of economic aid and through TIKA funded the construction of hospitals, schools, power plants and roads.

== Presidential visits ==
Guest	Host	Place of visit	Date of visit
(Mauritania) President Moktar Ould Daddah	(Turkey) President Fahri Korutürk	Çankaya Köşkü, Ankara	1974
(Mauritania) President Mohamed Ould Abdel Aziz	(Turkey) President Abdullah Gül	Çankaya Köşkü, Ankara	2010
(Turkey) President Recep Tayyip Erdoğan	(Mauritania) President Mohamed Ould Abdel Aziz	Presidential Palace, Nouakchott	February 28, 2018

== Economic relations ==
Trade volume between the two countries was 245 million USD in 2019.

There are direct flights from Istanbul to Nouakchott.

== See also ==
- Foreign relations of Mauritania
- Foreign relations of Turkey
