= Hamadi Ould Baba Ould Hamadi =

Mauritanian politician

- حمادي ولد بابا ولد حمادي
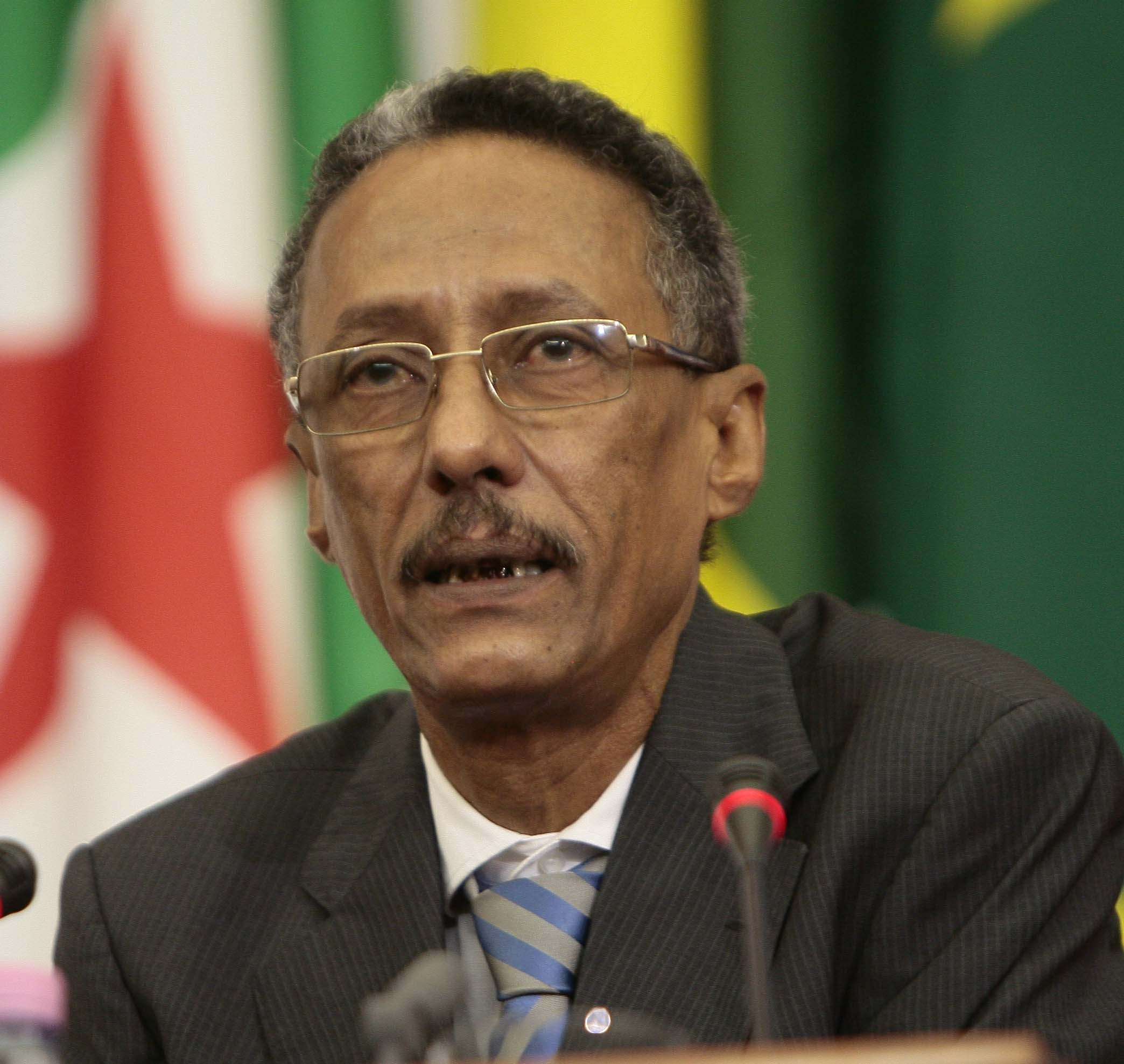
- Hamadi as Mauritanian Foreign Minister in 2011.

Minister of Fishing
- In office 18 September 2013 – 20 August 2014
- President: Mohamed Ould Abdel Aziz
- Prime Minister: Moulaye Ould Mohamed Laghdaf

Minister for Foreign Affairs and Cooperation
- In office 22 March 2011 – 18 September 2013
- President: Mohamed Ould Abdel Aziz
- Prime Minister: Moulaye Ould Mohamed Laghdaf
- Preceded by: Naha Mint Mouknass
- Succeeded by: Ahmed Ould Teguedi

Personal details
- Born: 31 December 1948 (age 77) Moudjeria, Colony of Mauritania
- Party: Union for the Republic (UPR)
- Children: 1
- Education: National School for Administration
- Profession: Engineer, Politician

Hamadi Ould Baba Ould Hamadi (Arabic: حمادي ولد بابا ولد حمادي; born 31 December 1948) is a Mauritanian politician. He was the Minister for Foreign Affairs and Cooperation of Mauritania from March 2011 until September 2013.

== Early life ==
Hamadi was born in Moudjeria, then part of the French Colony of Mauritania. He attended primary school in Moudjeria and Aleg from 1956 to 1961. He attended secondary school between Atar, Rosso, and Nouakchott from 1962 to 1966. He attended the National School for Administration from 1966 to 1968, graduating with a degree in civil engineering.

== Career ==
From 1968 to 1978, he worked as an official at the Ministry of Public Works, and from October 1983 to November 1990 worked as Secretary General of FIAP. He worked as a consultant and project manager at DGPIP until May 2007.

=== Defense ===
After Mohamed Ould Abdel Aziz was elected president of Mauritania in the 2009 presidential election, Aziz appointed Hamadi to the position of Minister of National Defense.

=== Foreign minister ===
Hamadi met with Romania's former foreign minister, Titus Corlățean, on 29 September 2012. Both foreign ministers discussed about the possibility of reestablishing relations between the two countries.

On 25 May 2013, Hamadi attended the African Union Summit. While there, he spoke about the crises in Mali and Sahel with Ban Ki-moon, the Secretary-General of the United Nations.

A few months later, on 18 September 2013, Hamadi was replaced by Ahmed Ould Teguedi as Foreign Minister in a Cabinet reshuffle. Hamadi was named as the new Minister of Fishing.

== Personal life ==
He is married and has a child.
