= Mauritania–United Arab Emirates relations =

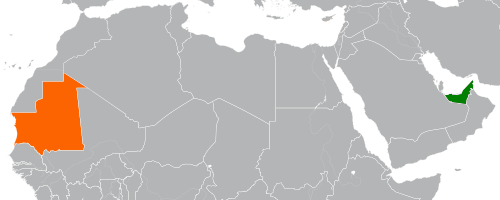

- Mauritania: United Arab Emirates

Mauritania–United Arab Emirates relations refers to the bilateral relations between Mauritania and the United Arab Emirates. Mauritania and the UAE are both members of the Arab League.

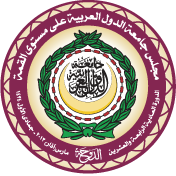
2013 Arab League Summit Logo

== History ==
Relations between Mauritania and the UAE began in 1973. The UAE established an embassy in Mauritania on 8 July, 1973. Mauritania joined the Arab League four months later. The UAE was a founding member of the Arab League.

In April 1974, Moktar Ould Daddah took part in the first official visit between Mauritania and the UAE. In August of the same year, Zayed bin Sultan Al Nahyan visited Mauritania. In 2008, Sidi Ould Cheikh Abdallahi visited the UAE, where he discussed the relationship of the two countries with Khalifa bin Zayed Al Nahyan. In 2023, Mohamed Ould Ghazouani visited Dubai for a conference for the United Nations Framework Convention on Climate Change. During his visit, he also made diplomatic gestures with Shakhbout bin Nahyan Al Nahyan and Suhail bin Mohammed Faraj Faris Al Mazrouei. In 2025, Hamad Ghanem Al-Mehairi, the Emirati ambassador to Mauritania, met with Sidi Yahya Ould Cheikhna Ould Lemrabott, Minister of Islamic Affairs and Education in Mauritania, to discuss the relations of the two countries.

There are numerous economic treaties between Mauritania and the UAE. Agreements were signed in January 2011 and January 2012. Mauritania has heavy economic reliance on the UAE. Goods from the UAE make up a significant portion of the Mauritanian market. This has been recognized to push out indigenous Mauritanian goods from domestic markets.

UAE is Mauritania's main trade partner. Trade relations between Mauritania and the UAE are one-sided, with Mauritania relying on loans and trade from the UAE. In 2016, Mauritanian exports to the UAE amounted to 9 million dollars, while UAE imports to Mauritania amounted to about 249 million dollars. Mauritania has also relied on Emirati support for infrastructure, including construction projects and industrialization. In the 1970s, following the withdrawal of European funding, the UAE provided funding for Mauritania's "Road of Hope", a road construction project meant to link remote regions of the country to the capital. In February 2020, the UAE promised $2 billion USD in support for Mauritania.

The UAE has repeatedly provided Mauritania military support to deal with internal conflicts, such as during the Arab Spring. During the 2010s, the UAE established a military academy in Mauritania. The two countries also signed a memorandum of understanding on the topic of fighting terrorism. In 2020, Mauritania denied reports of the UAE having a military base in the country, near the border with Algeria. This came amid news of the second Libyan civil war.

During the 2026 Iran war, Mauritania repeatedly released statements in support of the UAE. Statements were released in April and May.
