= Nouakchott Convention Center =

Coordinates: 18°6′37″N 15°59′7″W

The Convention Center (Palais des Congrès) in Nouakchott, Mauritania is located north of the Olympic Stadium and next to the Ministry of Foreign Affairs. The modern building, which has a 700-seat plenary room with several large break out rooms and is equipped for simultaneous translation capabilities, is used for both commercial and government meetings.
