= Egypt–Mauritania relations =

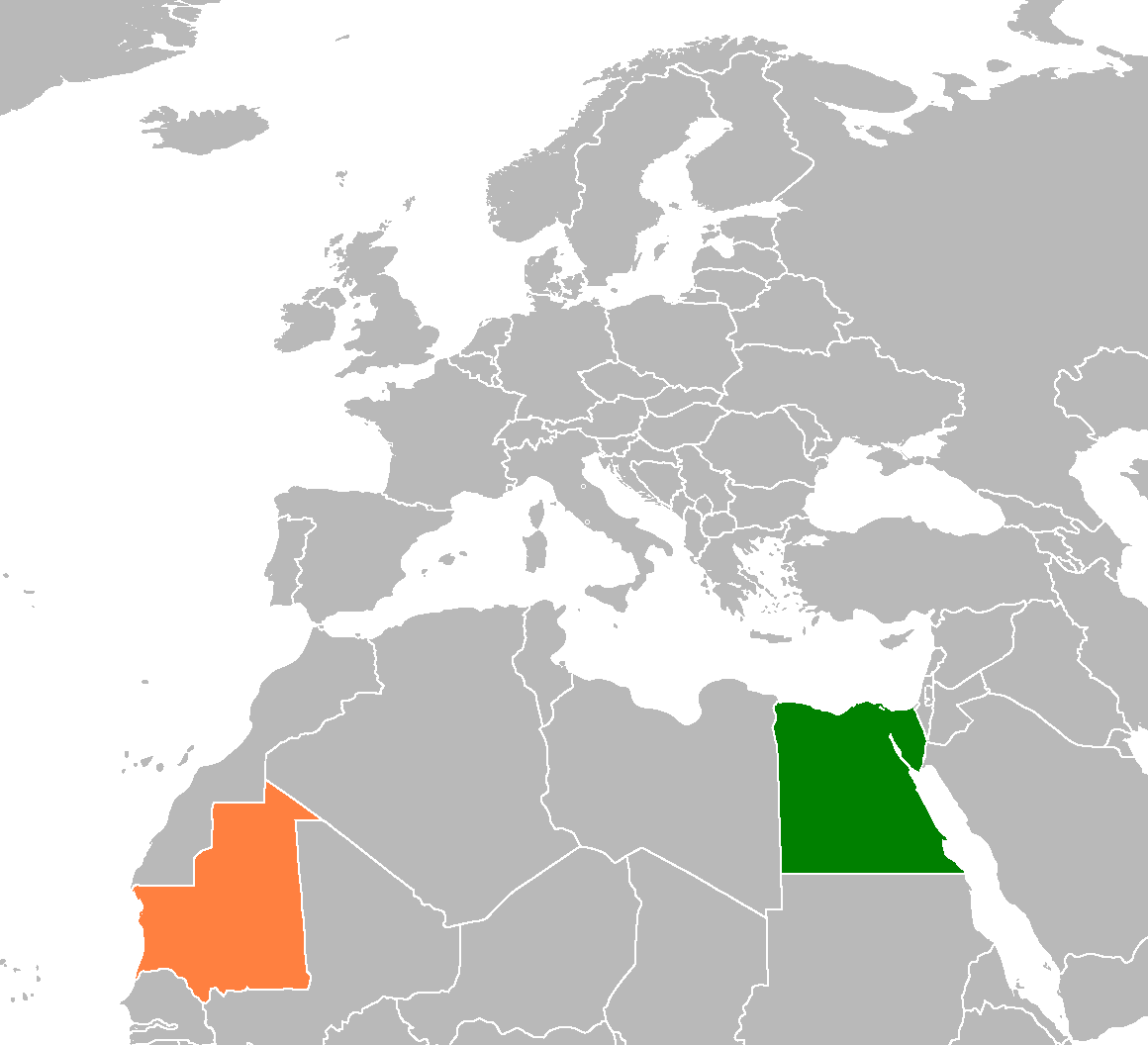
- Egypt: Mauritania

Egypt–Mauritania relations refers to the bilateral relations between Egypt and Mauritania. Egypt Mauritania are both members of the Arab League.

== History ==
In October 1961, the United Arab Republic, a predecessor to the modern state of Egypt, was the only country to vote against Mauritania's application for membership in the United Stations.

Relations between Mauritania and the UAR were formally established in July 1963, when a Mauritanian delegation visited Egypt for the first time. In 1964, an Egyptian Cultural Center was established in Nouakchott.

In 1992, Egypt helped negotiate settlements regarding the Mauritania–Senegal Border War.

In 2008, a memorandum of understanding was signed between Egypt and Mauritania, formally establishing relations between the two countries. Later in the year, two joint sessions were held. Following this, there were a number of other diplomatic visits. In 2009, Mona Omar, the Assistant Foreign Minister for African Affairs and African Union Affairs, attended the inauguration of Mohamed Ould Abdel Aziz. In 2010, a Mauritanian delegation led by Mohammad Ould Bou-Kheir, visited Egypt to discuss tourism. There were a series of visits in 2014 and 2015.

In 2014, during the Sixty-ninth session of the United Nations General Assembly, Abdel Fattah el-Sisi and Mohamed Ould Abdel Aziz, presidents of Egypt and Mauritania respectively, discussed a number of regional issues.

In 2021, Khaled Fathi Youssef, the new Egyptian ambassador to Mauritania was greeted by Mohamed Ould Ghazouani in Nouakchott. During the meeting, Youssef praised Mauritania's role in Sahelian politics. In 2022, a meeting between the two countries established a common desire to create stronger ties. In 2023, Houssein Sidi Abdoullah Dieh, the new Mauritanian ambassador to Egypt, presented his credentials to Abdel Fattah el-Sisi.

In May 2025, a joint committee was held between Mauritania and Egypt. It was the first joint committee held between the two countries since 2006. During the meeting 19 treaties and memorandums of understanding were signed. The meeting was taken as the re-establishment of relations between the two countries.

Economic ties between Egypt and Mauritania were established in 1964 and later followed up on in 1966, 1967, and numerous times in the 21st century, when Egypt and Mauritania furthered economic ties. Egyptian contractor companies have worked to build roads in Mauritania. Egypt has also funded training in the fields of agriculture, medicine, media, police, judiciary, and the diplomatic institute.

Between January and June 2009, Egypt exported 9,404 tons of materials to Mauritania, while importing 4,636 tons of Mauritanian goods. Mauritania's primary exports to Egypt are fish products, while Egypt's primary exports to Mauritania include food, building materials, drugs, home appliances, and more.

In April 2024, an agreement was signed between Egyptian energy companies and the Mauritanian government, worth $1 billion.
