= Mauritanian nationality law =

Mauritanian Nationality Code

Mauritanian Parliament
- Long title: Loi No. 61-112 du 12 juin 1961 portant Code de la nationalité mauritanienne tel que modifié par la Loi No.1962-157 et la Loi No.1976-207 Loi. No.2010-023 du 11 février 2010 abrogeant et remplaçant certaines dispositions de la loi 61–112 du 12 juin 1961 portant Code de la nationalité mauritanienne
- Enacted by: Government of Mauritania
- Status: Current legislation

Mauritanian nationality law is regulated by the Constitution of Mauritania, as amended; the Mauritanian Nationality Code, and its revisions; and various international agreements to which the country is a signatory. These laws determine who is, or is eligible to be, a national of Mauritania. The legal means to acquire nationality, formal legal membership in a nation, differ from the domestic relationship of rights and obligations between a national and the nation, known as citizenship. Nationality describes the relationship of an individual to the state under international law, whereas citizenship is the domestic relationship of an individual within the nation. Mauritanian nationality is typically obtained under the jus sanguinis, i.e. by birth in Mauritania or abroad to parents with Mauritanian nationality. It can be granted to persons with an affiliation to the country, or to a permanent resident who has lived in the country for a given period of time through naturalization.

== Acquisition of nationality ==
Nationality can be acquired in Mauritania at birth or later in life through naturalization.

=== By birth ===
Mauritanian law makes distinction between derivative nationality for children from mothers and fathers, as well as on the basis of birth in the country. Unless the father of a child born in Mauritania is a foreigner, stateless, or unknown, a child may not acquire nationality from their mother. Children born abroad to a Mauritanian mother and foreign father can not obtain Mauritanian nationality until the year immediately preceding their majority. This means that unless the child automatically obtains the nationality of their father, it will be stateless until becoming an adult. Upon attaining majority, children may repudiate nationality which was obtained through their mother. Those who acquire nationality at birth include:

- Children born anywhere to a Mauritanian father;
- Children born in Mauritania to a Mauritanian mother, if the father is a foreigner, stateless, or unknown; or
- Newborn foundlings born in the country whose parents are unknown.

=== By naturalization ===
Naturalization can be granted to persons who have resided in the territory for a sufficient period of time to confirm they understand the customs and traditions of Mauritania and are integrated into the society. Applicants must be fluent in Arabic, Pulaar, Soninké, or the Wolof language. General provisions are that applicants have good character and conduct; are in good physical and mental health; and have no criminal record. Applicants must typically have resided in the country for ten years. Besides foreigners meeting the criteria, other persons who may be naturalized include:

- Children legally adopted by a Mauritanian parent, at the time of completion of a legal adoption can obtain Mauritanian nationality at the discretion of authorities;
- Children born abroad to a Mauritanian mother and foreign father may apply for registration as a national in the year preceding their majority;
- Minor children are automatically naturalized when their parent acquires nationality;
- Persons born in the territory who did not acquire nationality at birth may naturalize after a five-year residency;
- The wife of a Mauritanian national after a five-year residency period;
- The husband of a Mauritanian national who was married under Sharia law after residing in the territory for five years; or (Note: Husbands not married under Sharia law to Mauritanian women have no preferential path to nationality and must meet all requirements for regular naturalization.)
- Persons who have performed exceptional service to the nation may naturalize after a five-year residency period.

== Loss of nationality ==
There are no provisions in the nationality laws for Mauritanian nationals to renounce their nationality. Mauritanians of origin may lose their nationality for obtaining dual nationality without the permission of the authorities. Naturalized persons may be denaturalized in Mauritania for disloyalty to the state; committing crimes against the state or state security; ordinary crimes; or for fraud, misrepresentation, or concealment in a naturalization petition. Within a year of obtaining naturalization, if a person is found to have a physical or mental disability, their nationality can be revoked, regardless of whether they would become stateless. Persons who previously had nationality, were not deprived of it, and wish to repatriate must request reinstatement, which is discretionary.

== History ==
From the third century, Berbers began migrating from the north to the territory and incorporated the indigenous people into their society. By the ninth century, three clans, the Djodala, Lemtuna, and Messufa, established the Sanhadja Confederation. The Lemtuna were the dominant group in the confederation, which controlled trade in the Sahara between the traditional independent nomadic groups and the established Berber Muslims who were involved in commerce. Their territory, known as the Bilad al-Mulathameen (the land of the Mulathameen) or Bilad al-Sanhaja (the land of the Sanhaja) stretched from Aoudaghost in the west to Timbuktu in the east, extending south to Koumbi Saleh. Because of the decentralization of the confederation, they were vulnerable to attacks, such as that waged by the Ghana Empire to seize Aoudaghost in 990. In the early part of the eleventh century the Sanhadja Confederation was replaced by the theocratic Almoravid Empire. The Almoravids established a political community which strictly adhered to Islamic principles. By 1054, they had retaken Aoudaghast from Ghana and in 1076, the Almoravids captured Koumbi Saleh, eventually extending their influence as far as Morocco and southern Spain. They ruled in the territory until the thirteenth century.

=== African empires and outsider contact (1300–1899) ===
When the Almoravid Empire declined, groups of Yemeni Arabs began raiding in the northern part of the territory, pushing black inhabitants south. Their disruption of the trade routes pushed commerce centers out of the area and toward the east. In 1455, the Portuguese built a trading fort at Arguin and began trading guns for slaves with the Beni Ḥassān, one of the Yemeni Arab groups. With the merger of Portugal and Spain into the Iberian Union in 1580, Spanish traders began dominating the coastal trade. They were driven out by the Dutch in 1638, whose trade focus was gum arabic, a substance used in textile printing. Though the Berbers attempted to stop the encroachments into their territory, they were defeated in the thirty-year conflict known as the Char Bouba war, which lasted from 1644 to 1674. The Ḥassān eventually overtook the entire territory of modern Mauritania, imposing the rigid Moorish social order upon the inhabitants. The Ḥassān Arabs, who ruled were at the apex of the social hierarchy followed by the Berber scholars, known as "zawiya", and herders and farmers, called "znaga" who paid tribute to the rulers. On the lowest tiers were the Haratin, who had formerly been slaves and the slaves, who were typically black Africans.

By 1678 the French drove the Dutch from the region, establishing a settlement at the mouth of the Senegal River, known as Saint-Louis, which became their trading center. Trading with the Ḥassān from the base in Saint-Louis, European traders preferred to avoid the difficult coast and desert climate of the territory and the Ḥassān were able to exploit European rivalries to obtain preferential trade agreements and gifts. In 1796, Britain ousted France from West Africa, but after the Napoleonic Wars, the Congress of Vienna in 1815, returned the coastal territory from Cap Blanc to Saint-Louis to France. The Ḥassān continued their traditional practices of raiding and warfare, buying arms from the French. Administering the territory from Saint-Louis, the French did not focus on the area unless the actions of the Arab rulers interrupted the gum arabic trade and when that happened they dispatched troops to take punitive action. A French officer, Jean-François Caillé, first named the territory Mauritania in 1843, but the name did not come into official use until 1899. French forces conquered a few small states in the region, the Brakna, Oualo, and Trarza emirates, in the 1850s extending a protectorate over Brakna and Trarza. They also undertook a program to map the territory, but increasingly their scientific expeditions were under attack and the leaders held for ransom.

=== French period (1899–1960) ===
In 1899, a decision was made to take steps to protect Mauritania, which was an important link for trade between Senegal and Morocco. Xavier Coppolani was tasked with devising a plan, and he arrived in the area in 1901. The two-pronged approach Coppolani used involved securing alliances with Berber scholars, while at the same time using the conflicts between rival Ḥassān leaders to weaken their resistance. By 1904, Coppolani's plan had organized French military posts throughout the central and southern areas of the region and the Civil Territory of Mauritania was established. To take the northern Adrar Region, he convinced the French government to send military forces, but was killed in May 1905, before the troops set out. In 1908, Colonel Henri Gouraud was appointed as commissioner of the Territory and led a four-year campaign to subdue the north.

Under Article 109 of the French Constitution of 1848, French territories were to be governed by specific laws until the constitution was extended there. This provision laid the groundwork for nationality legislation based upon whether the native inhabitants were able to be assimilated by adopting European standards. From 1848, those persons who settled in the colonies and were from France were considered nationals who had full rights and were subject to French law. However, those born in the new territories were considered to be nationals without citizenship. Nationals in the older colonies of the Antilles, Guiana, Réunion and parts of India and Senegal were granted political rights, but those in new colonies were confirmed by a decree on 14 July 1865 to be subjects and not citizens, unless they renounced their allegiance to native custom and possessed sufficient understanding of the obligations of citizenship.

Also in 1848, slavery was abolished throughout the French Empire and the Civil Code was extended to all of the French citizens in the colonies. Under the Civil Code, women were legally incapacitated and paternal authority was established over their children. Upon marriage, a woman married to a French man automatically acquired the same nationality as her spouse. Illegitimate children were barred from inheritance and nationality could only be transmitted through a father. Non-citizen nationals were governed by traditional laws concerning marriage and inheritance which placed the well-being of the community above individual rights. These laws prevented a wife from being treated as a slave, required her husband to support her, and entitled her kin to a bride price, to compensate them for the loss of her fertility to their kinship group and secure the legality of the union. Having paid the price for the marriage contract, she and her offspring belonged to the kinship network of her husband and could be inherited if her husband died.

The French Nationality Law of 1889 codified previous statutory laws, changing the French standard from jus sanguinis to jus soli and was extended to the French West Indies. Under its terms, women who would become stateless by the rule to acquire their spouse's nationality were allowed to retain their French nationality upon marriage. In 1895, the French established the administration system that would govern its possessions in French West Africa for the next sixty years. A Governor-General was installed and a headquarters was founded in Dakar, in the Colony of Senegal. The Governor-General's authority was extended to Senegal, French Guinea, and the Ivory Coast colonies, and in 1899 to Dahomey and French Sudan. The Nationality Law was modified in 1897 when it was extended to the remainder of the French colonies. Clarification in the 1897 decree included that bestowing nationality by birth in French territory only applied to children born in France, restoring descent requirements for the colonies. Under the Code de l'indigénat (Code of Indigenous Status) promulgated for Algeria in 1881 and extended to French West Africa in 1904, nationals in the new colonies followed customary law. The French West African Federation had been founded that year with the existing five colonies, of Dahomey, Guinea, Ivory Coast, Senegal, and French Sudan, and was later expanded to include Mauritania, Niger, and Upper Volta. Mauritania was officially administered by Senegal, but did not formally become part of the West African Federation until 1920.

On 25 May 1912, a Décret N°. 27892 was issued specifically addressing the status of French West Africans. Under its terms, African subjects could acquire French citizenship if at the age of majority and having proved three years of established domicile in the territory, they were able to read and write French; they were of good character and assimilated to French culture, or they engaged in a public or private French enterprise for a minimum or ten years; and they had sufficient means of self-support. The language requirement could be waived for those who had received military medals or recognition of the Legion of Honor or were in the French civil service. Upon application, subjects were required to acknowledge that they gave up their personal status under customary law and were to be governed by French laws. The decree noted that married women and minor children acquired the status of their husband or father however, this was only the case if the marriage had been conducted under French law, rather than customary practice.

Following the end of World War I France passed a law, "Décret N°. 24 on 25 March 1915 that allowed subjects or protected persons who were non-citizen nationals and had established domicile in a French territory to acquire full citizenship, including the naturalization of their wives and minor children, by having received the cross of the Legion of Honor, having obtained a university degree, having rendered service to the nation, having attained the rank of an officer or received a medal from the French army, who had married a Frenchwoman and established a one-year residency; or who had resided for more than ten years in a colony other than their country of origin. A 1918 decree written for French West Africa was aimed at decorated veterans of the war and their families, providing they had not previously been denied their rights nor participated in actions against French rule.

In 1927, France passed a new Nationality Law, which under Article 8, removed the requirement for married women to automatically derive the nationality of a husband and provided that her nationality could only be changed if she consented to change her nationality. It also allowed children born in France to native-born French women married to foreigners to acquire their nationality from their mothers. When it was implemented it included Guadeloupe, Martinique and Réunion but was extended to the remaining French possessions for French citizens only in 1928. Under Article 26 of the 1928 decree was the stipulation that it did not apply to natives of the French possessions except Algeria, Guadeloupe, Martinique, and Réunion. In 1938, the legal incapacity of married women was finally invalidated for French citizens. In 1939, France determined that marriage and inheritance were too significant to continue being dealt with in native courts. That year, the Mandel Decree was enacted in French West Africa as well as French Equatorial Africa. Under its terms child marriage was discouraged. It established the minimum age at marriage as fourteen for women and sixteen for men, invalidated marriages wherein spouses did not consent, and nullified levirate marriage without approval of the woman.

At the end of World War II, a statute issued on 7 March 1944 granted French citizenship to those who had performed services to the nation, such as serving as civil servants or receiving recognitions. The Constitution of 1946 granted French citizenship to all subjects of France's territories without having to renounce their personal status as natives. In 1945, a new Code of French Nationality was passed, which conferred once again automatic French nationality on foreign wives of French men, but allowed mothers who were French nationals to pass their nationality to children born outside of France. It expressly applied to Algeria, French Guiana, Guadeloupe, Martinique and Réunion and was extended to the Overseas Territories in 1953, but in the case of the latter had distinctions for the rights of those who were naturalized. In 1951 the Jacquinot Decree strengthened the provisions in French West and Equatorial Africa of the Mandel decree removing women who were twenty-one years old, or divorced, from control by a father or guardian and establishing specific rules for the payment and determining the amount of a bride price.

The legal framework of Mauritania was changed by the Loi-cadre Defferre issued on 23 June 1956, which granted internal self-governance and universal suffrage to French territories and expanded their Territorial Assemblies. These changes led to an increase in political activity and a press for the dissolution of the Federation of French West Africa. Because of ethnic divisions, the north was populated mainly by people who identified culturally with the Moors, while the south was inhabited by traditionally African society, conflicts arose. Those from the north pressed to secede from Mauritania and align with Morocco, while those from the south pushed for union with the Mali Federation. Though the anti-colonial movement was strong, the divides led to instability, which was overcome finally when Moktar Ould Daddah organized the Congress of Aleg in May 1958 to balance the needs of each side and retain national unity. With the passage of the 1958 French Constitution, nationality provisions were standardized for France, Overseas Departments, and Overseas Territories. Article 86 excluded the possibility for independence of the colonies, but allowed them to become autonomous republics. In October, Mauritanian legislators convened a Constituent Assembly to draft a constitution, which replaced the French constitution in 1959. The French Constitution was amended in 1960 to allow states to maintain membership in the French Community even if they were independent republics and Mauritania declared its independence.

=== Post-independence (1960–present) ===
Mauritania gained its independence on 28 November 1960 and 12 June 1961, passed its first nationality law as the Islamic Republic of Mauritania. Under its terms, Article 68 stated that persons who had habitually resided in Mauritania at the time of independence were eligible to choose for Mauritanian nationality. Because the government did not bestow nationality, but gave people the option to apply at independence, and required documentation from the civil registry, there were ambiguities in who derived nationality. Children born in the territory to parents also born in Mauritania, regardless of their nationality, and children born abroad to a parent who was a Mauritanian national were entitled to derive nationality. However, children born in the country could only obtain nationality maternally if the father was stateless or had no known nationality and children born abroad to a Mauritanian mother could not obtain Mauritanian nationality before reaching their majority. Children born in the country to foreign parents could acquire nationality after a five-year residency, which was the same residency requirement for naturalization. Wives of Mauritanian husbands automatically were granted nationality upon request. An amendment was passed in 1962 (Loi No. 62-157) which limited the option for Mauritanian nationality contained in Article 68 to those who exercised the option before 31 January 1963. Another amendment, passed in 1976 (Loi No. 76-207) clarified in Article 64 that a certificate of nationality was to be issued by the administrative authority.

In the 1980s, the Mauritanian government established policies for Arabization, denaturalizing and deporting between 70,000 and 80,000 black Mauritanians who were not of Arab descent. Many of these non-Arabs became stateless persons living in Mali and Senegal. The denaturalizations followed a dispute over the nomadic Fulani herdsmen's right to graze their cattle in the valleys of the Senegal River and was then extended to other black African groups. In the period between 1994 and 1997, some 30,000 of these exiles returned but because of difficulties in obtaining identity documents, many were forced to leave again. In 2000, the African Commission on Human and Peoples' Rights concluded that the deportations were in violation of the African Charter. Among the recommendations of the commission were repatriation with restoration of identity documents and property, as well as compensation. Pressure from the international community to address the issue resulted in the Military Council for Justice and Democracy, established after the 2005 coup d'état to organize a consultation to address the 1980s revocations of nationality. A repatriation program was launched in 2007 after consultation with the government of Senegal and the Office of the United Nations High Commissioner for Human Rights, which by 2012 had resulted in 24,000 persons recovering their Mauritanian nationality.

Substantial modifications were made to the Nationality Code in 2010, when the law was amended to apply a strict protocol of descent for acquisition of nationality. The amendment removed the provision, except for foundlings, for children born in Mauritania to acquire nationality by birth in the territory. This meant that children, born in Mauritania to foreigners who cannot pass on their nationality to their children born abroad or to parents who are both stateless, were unable to obtain Mauritanian nationality. According to African nationality scholar, Bronwen Manby, in part the changes were made to "make it more difficult for undocumented persons to gain recognition of their nationality" and to facilitate the implementation of a new biometric identity program. The revision also removed both French and Bambara as languages qualifications for naturalization, eliminated some of the gender discrimination which had previously been present in the law, and allowed for Mauritanians to hold dual nationality. However, it retained discrimination in children deriving nationality from their Mauritanian mothers, from acquiring nationality from their mothers at birth, and husbands from deriving nationality from their Mauritanian wives on an equal footing with Mauritanian men's spouses.
