= Mohamed Salem Ould Merzoug =

Mauritanian politician

- محمد سالم ولد مرزوك
- Mohamed Salem Ould Merzoug in 2021

Minister of Foreign Affairs
- Incumbent
- Assumed office 31 March 2022
- President: Mohamed Ould Ghazouani
- Preceded by: Ismail Ould Cheikh Ahmed

Personal details
- Party: Equity Party

Mohamed Salem Ould Merzoug (Arabic: محمد سالم ولد مرزوك) is a Mauritanian politician. He has served as Minister of Foreign Affairs since 2022.
