= Foreign relations of Mauritania =

The foreign relations of the Islamic Republic of Mauritania have, since 1960, been dominated by the issues of the Spanish Sahara (now Western Sahara or Sahrawi Arab Democratic Republic) and the recognition of its independence by its neighbours, particularly Morocco. Mauritania's foreign relations are handled by the Minister of Foreign Affairs and Cooperation, who is currently Mohamed Salem Ould Merzoug.

== History ==
Previously a colony of France, Mauritania gained Independence in 1960, although this was disapproved of by the Arab League due to Morocco's claims on Mauritania. Mauritania applied to join the United Nations in 1960 but was vetoed by the Soviet Union, who voted the next year for Mauritania's admission in exchange for the admission of Mongolia.

Initially, Mauritania continued good relations with France to counterbalance Morocco's ambitions, but by 1962 the country turned away from wholesale support of France and began normalizing relations with its neighbours, eventually establishing diplomatic relations with Mali in 1963 through the Treaty of Kayes, and with Algeria and the United Arab Republic in 1964. In 1963, Mauritania joined the Organization of African Unity (OAU), which led to Morocco's resignation (Morocco did not recognize Mauritania until 1969). With the OAU's and Arab League's encouragement, Mauritania did not seek diplomatic relations with Portugal, Israel or apartheid South Africa; today, following the downfall of the Apartheid system and the decolonization of Portugal's empire, relations with Portugal and South Africa have been normalized. Diplomatic relations with Israel continue to be strained due to the Occupation of Palestine.

== Claims to Western Sahara territory ==
In 1976, Mauritania officially annexed a third of the then Spanish Sahara following Spain's withdrawal from the region. Algeria and Morocco responded by withdrawing their ambassadors from Mauritania; additionally, the rebel Polisario group began a guerilla war against both Mauritania and Morocco.

Mauritania withdrew its claims and recognized the Sahrawi Arab Democratic Republic (SADR) as the territory's sovereign government in 1980, although this allowed Morocco to take control of the SADR. Mauritania has since declared neutrality in the dispute, seeking a peaceful and expedient end to the conflict, while its diplomatic relations with Algeria and Morocco have resumed.

== African Union membership ==
Mauritania joined the African Union (AU) in 1963. Following a military coup d'état in 2005, Mauritania's membership was suspended "until the restoration of constitutional order in the country". This left Mauritania diplomatically isolated within Africa, as it became the only country on the continent except Morocco without full membership in the AU.

In March 2007 democratic rule was restored in Mauritania, with presidential elections declared "free and fair" by international observers. However, its membership was suspended again following the 2008 coup.

== Diplomatic relations ==
List of countries which Mauritania maintains diplomatic relations with:

#	Country	Date
1	Germany	28 November 1960
2	United Kingdom	28 November 1960
3	United States	28 November 1960
4	Japan	29 November 1960
5	France	6 December 1960
6	Belgium	13 April 1961
7	Spain	15 April 1961
8	Tunisia	29 April 1961
9	Brazil	17 May 1961
10	Switzerland	26 May 1961
11	Luxembourg	20 September 1961
12	Netherlands	9 March 1962
13	Senegal	4 May 1962
14	Guinea	15 August 1962
15	Ivory Coast	15 August 1962
16	Italy	25 February 1963
17	South Korea	30 July 1963
18	Mali	1963
19	Algeria	9 April 1964
20	Serbia	12 June 1964
21	Russia	12 July 1964
22	Egypt	21 October 1964
23	North Korea	12 November 1964
24	Romania	15 January 1965
25	Czech Republic	9 March 1965
26	Vietnam	15 March 1965
27	Ghana	6 April 1965
28	China	19 July 1965
29	Albania	24 September 1965
30	India	22 October 1965
31	Cambodia	29 October 1965
32	Hungary	1 December 1965
33	Poland	3 December 1965
34	Chile	10 December 1965
35	Gambia	15 December 1965
36	Bulgaria	28 December 1965
37	Syria	11 June 1966
38	Ethiopia	21 September 1966
39	Liberia	13 March 1967
40	Mongolia	30 June 1967
41	Canada	12 December 1968
42	Sudan	11 June 1969
43	Iraq	1 September 1969
44	Cameroon	13 November 1969
45	Niger	4 December 1969
46	Libya	9 January 1970
47	Austria	23 January 1970
48	Kuwait	17 March 1970
49	Saudi Arabia	22 March 1970
50	Turkey	14 April 1970
51	Jordan	4 May 1970
52	Morocco	6 June 1970
53	Pakistan	November 1970
54	Sweden	14 December 1970
55	Benin	1970
56	Republic of the Congo	1970
57	Zambia	30 April 1971
58	Lebanon	10 June 1971
59	Sierra Leone	21 October 1971
60	Democratic Republic of the Congo	May 1972
61	Cuba	16 August 1972
62	Burkina Faso	3 October 1972
63	Greece	3 October 1972
64	United Arab Emirates	16 March 1973
65	Qatar	16 March 1973
66	Bahrain	30 April 1973
67	Iran	25 October 1973
68	Guinea-Bissau	10 August 1974
69	Portugal	3 March 1975
70	Denmark	19 April 1975
71	Mexico	24 June 1975
72	Uganda	3 February 1976
73	Nigeria	June 1976
74	Argentina	26 July 1976
75	Afghanistan	July 1976
76	Thailand	24 August 1976
77	Bangladesh	4 October 1976
78	Myanmar	5 October 1976
79	Cape Verde	18 January 1977
—	Sovereign Military Order of Malta	3 March 1977
80	Finland	1 March 1979
81	Yemen	19 February 1983
82	Norway	6 December 1983
83	Rwanda	27 April 1985
84	Colombia	1 July 1987
85	Angola	2 December 1987
—	State of Palestine	16 November 1988
86	Oman	23 January 1989
87	Uruguay	23 March 1989
88	Maldives	16 October 1989
89	Peru	19 June 1990
90	Estonia	18 September 1991
91	Latvia	18 September 1991
92	Seychelles	10 January 1992
93	Ukraine	30 September 1992
94	Slovakia	1 January 1993
95	Kazakhstan	28 April 1993
96	Bosnia and Herzegovina	1 November 1993
97	Azerbaijan	29 October 1994
98	South Africa	25 December 1994
99	Slovenia	4 June 1996
—	Israel (suspended)	28 October 1999
100	Australia	13 December 2001
101	Malta	20 February 2003
102	Malaysia	2003
103	Belarus	6 July 2004
104	Kenya	20 July 2004
105	Iceland	6 October 2004
106	Croatia	24 November 2004
107	North Macedonia	23 March 2005
108	Cyprus	6 May 2005
109	Mozambique	23 February 2006
110	Botswana	9 May 2007
111	Venezuela	28 September 2007
112	Brunei	23 October 2007
113	San Marino	16 November 2007
114	Armenia	30 January 2008
115	Uzbekistan	2 July 2008
116	Zimbabwe	25 July 2008
117	Montenegro	16 December 2009
—	Kosovo	14 September 2010
118	Namibia	29 September 2010
119	Mauritius	1 December 2010
120	Georgia	16 June 2011
121	Monaco	9 September 2011
122	Indonesia	27 September 2011
123	Solomon Islands	18 October 2011
124	Fiji	19 December 2011
125	Moldova	23 May 2012
126	Paraguay	5 June 2012
127	Tuvalu	13 June 2012
128	Equatorial Guinea	6 October 2012
129	Nepal	4 December 2012
130	Sri Lanka	12 December 2012
131	São Tomé and Príncipe	4 August 2013
132	Andorra	16 September 2013
133	Laos	19 September 2013
134	Philippines	30 September 2013
135	Central African Republic	8 October 2013
136	Ecuador	28 September 2014
137	Comoros	29 December 2014
138	Eritrea	16 August 2015
139	Tanzania	1 September 2015
140	New Zealand	2 September 2015
141	Kyrgyzstan	30 September 2015
142	Madagascar	11 November 2015
—	Holy See	9 December 2016
143	Djibouti	15 February 2017
144	Lesotho	9 March 2017
145	South Sudan	3 July 2017
146	Singapore	22 February 2018
147	Eswatini	22 March 2018
148	Somalia	27 March 2018
149	Nicaragua	14 October 2019
150	Honduras	4 August 2020
151	Tajikistan	21 September 2021
152	Burundi	26 July 2022
153	Panama	22 September 2022
154	Malawi	18 October 2022
155	Ireland	1 December 2022
156	Dominican Republic	19 September 2023
157	Saint Lucia	5 December 2023
158	El Salvador	10 December 2024
159	Togo	28 March 2025
160	Guatemala	24 September 2026
161	Chad	Unknown
162	Gabon	Unknown

== Bilateral relations ==
Country	Formal relations began	Notes
Argentina	26 July 1976	Both countries established diplomatic relations on 26 July 1976 Argentina is accredited to Mauritania from its embassy in Tunis, Tunisia.
Austria		Austria is accredited to Mauritania from its embassy in Rabat, Morocco and an honorary consulate in Nouakchott.; Mauritania is accredited to Austria from its embassy in Berlin, Germany.
China	19 July 1965	See China–Mauritania relations The government of Mauritania enjoys close ties with the government of the People's Republic of China. Diplomatic relations were established on 19 July 1965, and the governments remain on good terms. In recent years, they have signed a series of agreements and exchanged a series of diplomatic gestures that have strengthened their relationship. The Chinese government has recently shown particular interest in Mauritania's oil deposits. Oil production in Mauritania began in February 2006, and by May of the same year the Chinese and Mauritanian governments signed an agreement on social and economic cooperation. In October 2006, the state-owned China National Petroleum Corporation began drilling oil wells in Mauritania and has three other prospecting permits in Mauritania. The Mauritanian government sees oil production as a significant means of boosting economic growth. During the campaign for Mauritania's presidential elections in March 2007, candidate Sidi Ould Cheikh Abdallahi praised Mauritania's growing ties with China, promising to "continue the path of strengthening the bilateral relations with all my efforts".
Cyprus		Cyprus is accredited to Mauritania from its embassy in Tripoli, Libya.; Mauritania is accredited to Cyprus from its embassy in Rome.
Egypt	21 October 1964	See Egypt-Mauritania relations Both countries established diplomatic relations on 21 October 1964 when UAR (Egypt) officially recognized the Islamic Republic of Mauritania.
Finland		Finland is accredited to Mauritania from its embassy in Rabat, Morocco.; Mauritania is accredited to Finland from its embassy in Brussels, Belgium.
France	6 December 1960	See France–Mauritania relations Both countries established diplomatic relations on 6 December 1960. The relations date back to the colonial era when Mauritania was part of French West Africa. Most of Mauritania's developmental assistance in the 1980s was provided by France, which was also the major supplier of private direct investment. Bilateral accords signed with France in 1961 provided for economic, financial, technical, cultural, and military cooperation and aid. Although Mauritania opposed France on Algerian independence, nuclear testing in the Sahara, and French arms sales to South Africa, ties remained cordial through the Daddah term. French citizens worked in Mauritania as technical assistants in the government, administrators, teachers, and judges. Daddah frequently traveled to France, and French development aid flowed to Mauritania. The level of French involvement rose markedly following the outbreak of hostilities in the Western Sahara. Between 1976 and 1979, when Mauritania unilaterally declared peace and withdrew from combat, French aircraft provided air support for Mauritanian troops fighting Polisario forces, and French paratroops were stationed at Nouadhibou. Activity by Mauritanian dissidents living in France, together with Mauritania's gradual policy shift toward the Polisario, resulted in a growing coldness toward Paris. In May 1979, Mauritania asked France to remove all its troops from Nouadhibou. France continued to provide a high level of financial aid, although less than requested by the Haidalla government, and this curtailment further strained ties. Following alleged accusations of Moroccan support of a coup attempt in March 1981, Haidalla again turned to France to obtain guarantees of Mauritania's territorial integrity. President of France Georges Pompidou and Haidalla concluded an accord in 1981, as Morocco threatened to carry the struggle against Polisario guerrillas into Mauritanian territory. As Morocco's advancing sand walls increasingly obligated Polisario guerrillas to use Mauritania as a staging area, President Haidalla and, later, President Taya sought and received guarantees of French support in August 1984 and June 1987.
Germany	28 November 1960	See Germany–Mauritania relations Both countries established diplomatic relations on 28 November 1960 when has been accredited first Ambassador of FRG to Mauritania with residence in Dakar, Mr. Reichhold. On 6 May 1961 first Ambassador of Mauritania to FRG Mr. Mamadou Toure presented his credentials to President Lubke.
Greece		Greece is accredited to Mauritania from its embassy in Rabat, Morocco.; Mauritania is accredited to Greece from its embassy in Rome, Italy.
Hungary	1 December 1965	Both countries established diplomatic relations on 1 December 1965. Hungary is accredited to Mauritania from its embassy in Rabat, Morocco.
Iceland	6 October 2004	Both countries established diplomatic relations on 6 October 2004.: Mauritania is accredited to Iceland from its embassy in Brussels, Belgium.; Iceland is accredited to Mauritania from its Ministry of Foreign Affairs in Reykjavík.
India	22 October 1965	Both countries established diplomatic relations on 22 October 1965. India is accredited to Mauritania from its embassy in Bamako, Mali and an honorary consulate in Nouakchott.
Indonesia	27 September 2011	Both countries established diplomatic relations on 27 September 2011.: Mauritania has a resident embassy in Jakarta, Indonesia.; Indonesia is accredited to Mauritania, through its embassy in Rabat, Morocco.; Both countries are full members of the Organization of Islamic Cooperation.
Israel	28 October 1999– 6 March 2009	Mauritania declared war on Israel as a result of the 1967 Six-Day War, following the Arab League's collective decision (Mauritania was not admitted to the League until November 1973), and did not reverse that official declaration until at least 1991. Until 1999, Israelis were seemingly oblivious to the ongoing state of war. Mauritania did not abide by moves to recognize Israel's right to exist in the same way as most other Arab countries, after the earlier 1967 Khartoum Resolution. Little public information exists as to the state of war, and it has been inferred that the declaration of war has been reversed by: behind the scenes meetings between Mauritania and Israel in 1995 and 1996 said to be at the instigation of Mauritania's President Maaouya Ould Sid'Ahmed Taya; the establishment of unofficial "interest sections" in the respective Spanish embassies of the two capital cities in 1996, and; the official exchange of diplomatic representatives in each other's countries from 27 October 1999.; In 1999 Mauritania became one of three members of the 22-member Arab League to recognize Israel as a sovereign state (the others being Egypt and Jordan) This recognition was given by former President Maaouya Ould Sid'Ahmed Taya along with his cooperation with United States anti-terrorism activities. The establishment of full diplomatic relations was signed in Washington D.C on 28 October 1999. After the coup by the Military Council for Justice and Democracy in August 2005, recognition of Israel was kept and maintained. As a response to the conflict in the Gaza Strip, relations were frozen with Israel in January 2009. In February 2009, Mauritania recalled its ambassador from Israel, and on 6 March 2009 staff were evicted from the Israeli embassy in Nouakchott and given 48 hours to leave Mauritania. Israel officially closed the embassy later in the day, according to an announcement by its Foreign Affairs Ministry. By 21 March 2010 all diplomatic relations between the two states had officially ended.
Italy	25 February 1963	Both countries established diplomatic relations on 25 February 1963 when first Ambassador of Mauritania to Italy (resident in Paris) Mr. Bakar Ould Ahmedou presented his credentials to President Antonio Segni.: Italy is accredited to Mauritania from its embassy in Rabat, Morocco.; Mauritania has an embassy in Rome.
Japan	29 November 1960	Both countries established diplomatic relations on 29 November 1960, Mauritania has a resident embassy in Tokyo, Japan.
Libya	9 January 1970	Both countries established diplomatic relations on 9 January 1970.
Mali	July 1963	Since Mauritania negotiated a border dispute with Mali in 1963, ties between the two countries have been mostly cordial. Mali and Mauritania have cooperated on several development projects, such as the OMVS and a plan to improve roads between Nouakchott and Bamako. This cooperation somewhat lessened Mali's dependence on Senegal and Côte d'Ivoire. Although relations were warm with other black African states, since 1965 the orientation of Mauritania's foreign policy has been geared towards relations with North African countries.
Mexico	24 June 1975	Both countries established diplomatic relations on 24 June 1975.: Mauritania is accredited to Mexico from its embassy in Washington, D.C., United States.; Mexico is accredited to Mauritania from its embassy in Algiers, Algeria and an honorary consulate in Nouakchott.
Morocco	6 June 1970	See Mauritania–Morocco relations Both countries established diplomatic relations on 6 June 1970. Prior to the December 1984 coup that brought Taya to power, the Mauritanian-Moroccan cooperation agency stated that relations between the two countries were on the mend in spite of alleged Moroccan complicity in a 1981 coup attempt and Mauritania's subsequent turn toward Algeria. Representatives from both sides initiated a series of low-level contacts that led to a resumption of diplomatic ties in April 1985. For Mauritania, the relaxation with Morocco promised to end the threat of Moroccan incursions, and it also removed the threat of Moroccan support for opposition groups formed during the Haidalla presidency. Through the agreement with Mauritania, Morocco sought to tighten its control over the Western Sahara by denying the Polisario one more avenue for infiltrating guerrillas into the disputed territory. Relations between Morocco and Mauritania continued to improve through 1986, reflecting President Taya's pragmatic, if unstated, view that only a Moroccan victory over the Polisario would end the guerrilla war in the Western Sahara. Taya made his first visit to Morocco in October 1985 (prior to visits to Algeria and Tunisia) in the wake of Moroccan claims that Polisario guerrillas were again traversing Mauritanian territory. The completion of a sixth berm just north of Mauritania's crucial rail link along the border with the Western Sahara, between Nouadhibou and the iron ore mines, complicated relations between Mauritania and Morocco. Polisario guerrillas in mid-1987 had to traverse Mauritanian territory to enter the Western Sahara, a situation that invited Morocco's accusations of Mauritanian complicity. Moreover, any engagements near the sixth berm would threaten to spill over into Mauritania and jeopardize the rail link.
Netherlands	9 March 1962	Both countries established diplomatic relations on 9 March 1962.: Mauritania is accredited to The Netherlands from its embassy in Brussels, Belgium and an honorary consulate in Midwoud.; The Netherlands is accredited to Mauritania from their embassy in Dakar, Senegal.
Pakistan	November 1970	Both countries established diplomatic relations in November 1970 Pakistan and Mauritania maintain friendly relations, Pakistan has always supported Mauritania and so did Mauritania in the UN. Pakistan has provided equipment and training to Mauritanian Armed Forces, and is one of Pakistan's biggest trading partners.
Qatar	16 March 1973	Both countries established diplomatic relations on 16 March 1973. During the 2017 Qatar diplomatic crisis, Mauritania on 6 June 2017 cut off all diplomatic relations with Qatar. Relations were officially reestablished on 22 March 2021.
Poland		Mauritania is accredited to Poland from its embassy in Berlin, Germany.; Poland is accredited to Mauritania from its embassy in Rabat, Morocco.
Senegal	4 May 1962	See Mauritania–Senegal relations Both countries established diplomatic relations on 4 May 1962 when Permanent Representative of Mauritania to Senegal Mr. Mamadou Lamine Ba, presented his credentials to President Leopold Sedar Senghor. In the years following independence, Mauritania's principal ally in sub-Saharan Africa was Senegal, although the two countries have espoused different strategies for development. The growing split between blacks and Moors in Mauritania has, however, affected ties with Senegal, which sees itself as championing the rights of Mauritania's black minority. Under Taya, relations between the two countries were correct, even though each accused the other of harboring exiled dissidents. In May 1987, Senegal extradited Captain Moulaye Asham Ould Ashen, a former black member of the Haidalla government accused of corruption, but only after veiled threats from Nouakchott that failure to do so would result in Mauritania's allowing Senegalese dissidents a platform from which to speak out against the government of President Abdou Diouf. At the same time, Senegal and Mauritania have cooperated successfully with Mali under the Senegal River Development Office (Organisation pour la Mise en Valeur du Fleuve Sénégal—OMVS), which was formed in 1972 as a flood control, irrigation, and agricultural development project.
Serbia	12 June 1964	Both countries established diplomatic relations on 12 June 1964. Serbia is accredited to Mauritania from its embassy in Rabat, Morocco.
Singapore	22 February 2018	Both countries established diplomatic relations on 22 February 2018.; Mauritania is accredited to Singapore from its embassy in Tokyo, Japan.
South Africa	25 December 1994	Both countries established diplomatic relations on 25 December 1994.; Both countries are full members of the African Union.
South Korea	30 July 1963	Both countries established diplomatic relations on 30 July 1963. But South Korea severed its ties with Mauritania on 5 December 1964. Diplomatic relations were resumed on 19 December 1978 Mauritania and South Korea have made several high-ranking visits to each other's countries, including the Ambassador for the Permanent Mission of Mauritania to Geneva, traveled to South Korea in October 2008, and the Ambassador of the Republic of Korea to the Kingdom of Morocco, Lee Tae Ho to Mauritania in February 2013.
Switzerland	26 May 1961	Both countries established diplomatic relations on 26 May 1961.; Both countries are full members of the Organisation internationale de la Francophonie.
Turkey	14 April 1970	See Mauritania–Turkey relations Both countries established diplomatic relations on 14 April 1970.: Mauritania has an embassy in Ankara.; Turkey has an embassy in Nouakchott.; Both countries are members of the Organisation of Islamic Cooperation.; Trade volume between the two countries was US$245 million in 2019.
Ukraine	30 September 1992	Both countries established diplomatic relations on 30 September 1992.: Mauritania is accredited to Ukraine from its embassy in Berlin, Germany.; Ukraine is accredited to Mauritania from its embassy in Rabat, Morocco.
United Arab Emirates	8 July 1973	See Mauritania-United Arab Emirates relations
United Kingdom	28 November 1960	Mauritania established diplomatic relations with the United Kingdom on 28 November 1960.: Mauritania maintains an embassy in London.; The United Kingdom is accredited to Mauritania through its embassy in Nouakchott.; Both countries share common membership of the Atlantic co-operation pact, and the World Trade Organization. Bilaterally the two countries have a Development Partnership. The UK did not have an embassy in Mauritania until 2018: the British ambassador to Senegal was also accredited to Mauritania from 1960 to 1990 (Mauritania suspended relations with the UK following the Six-Day War and resumed them on 10 April 1968) and the British ambassador to Morocco was also accredited to Mauritania from 1990 until 2018 when the UK upgraded its office in Nouakchott to an embassy and appointed a resident ambassador.
United States	28 November 1960	See Mauritania–United States relations Both countries established diplomatic relations on 28 November 1960. Embassy of Mauritania in Washington, D.C. The U.S. Government fully supports Mauritania's transition to democracy and congratulates Mauritania on the successful series of 2006–2007 parliamentary, local and presidential elections. The U.S. condemned the August 2005 coup and the unconstitutional assumption of power by the Military Council for Justice and Democracy, and called for a return to a "constitutional government through free and fair elections as soon as possible". The United States provided election-related assistance for voting education, political party training, and democracy building. The U.S. now aims to work with the Mauritanian Government to expand bilateral cooperation in the areas of food security, health, education, security, strengthening democratic institutions, and counterterrorism.

== See also ==
- Katsarova, Ivana. "EU-Mauritania fisheries agreements" (PDF). Library Briefing. Library of the European Parliament.
