= List of universities and colleges in Mauritania =

This is a list of colleges and universities of Mauritania.

== Colleges and universities ==
In chronological order of foundation:

- National School for Administration - (Ecole Nationale d’Administration, ENA) est 1966, which became the School for Technical Sciences - (Faculté des Sciences Techniques, FST) in 1995
- Mauritanian Institute for Scientific Research - (Institut Mauritanien de Recherche Scientifique, IMRS) est 1974
- Advanced Institute for Islamic Studies and Research - (Institut Supérieur d’Etudes et de Recherche Islamiques, ISERI) 1979
- Institute for Arab and Islamic Sciences 1979
- Advanced Center for Technical Education - (Centre Supérieur d’Enseignement Technique, CSET) 1980
- Nouakchott University (NU) - (Université de Nouakchott) 1981
  - School of Law and Economics
  - School of Letters and Humanities
- Advanced Scientific Institute - (Institut Supérieur Scientifique, ISS) 1986
- National Institute for Special Medical Studies 1997
