= Vatma Vall Mint Soueina =

Mauritanian politician

Mauritanian Ambassador to Côte d'Ivoire
- In office 22 March 2019 – 30 April 2021

Minister of Livestock
- In office 2015–2018

Foreign Minister
- In office 2015

Minister of Culture and Handicraft
- In office 2014–2015

Personal details
- Born: 25 August 1977 (age 49) Ayoun el Atrous, Mauritania
- Education: University of Nouakchott

Vatma Vall Mint Soueina (born 25 August 1977) is a Mauritanian politician woman who served as Minister of Foreign Affairs in 2015, and as Minister of Livestock from 2015 to 2018.

== Early life and education ==
Mint Soueina was born on 25 August 1977 in Ayoun el Atrous. She is a member of the blacksmith caste. She studied at the Lycée National in Nouakchott before obtaining a master's degree in English from the University of Nouakchott in 2001.

== Career ==
Soueina was a high school English teacher from 2001 until 2005, before becoming Professor of American Studies and Literature at the University of Nouakchott in 2005.

In 2014, she was Minister of Culture and Handicraft. Soueina was appointed Foreign Minister in January 2015. She presided over the 142nd session of the Arab League Council and the 26th session of the Executive Council of the African Union in Addis Ababa.

In September 2015, in a cabinet reshuffle by President Mohamed Ould Abdel Aziz, she was replaced by Hamadi Ould Meimou and became Minister of Livestock.

Soueina served as Minister of Livestock until a cabinet reshuffle in October 2018.

She served as ambassador to the Ivory Coast from 2019 to 2021.

== Personal life ==
Soueina is married.
