= Dah Ould Abdi =

Mauritanian diplomat

- Born: April 18, 1951 (age 74)
- Occupation: Diplomat

Dah Ould Abdi (born April 18, 1951) is a Mauritanian diplomat who was Minister of Foreign Affairs and Cooperation from 2001 to 2002.

Ould Abdi was born in Aleg and attended secondary school in Nouakchott, the capital. He became press attaché for the Center for Information and Training (CIF) in Nouakchott in 1974. Subsequently, he was Editor in Chief at Radio Mauritania from 1975 to 1977 before going to study journalism in West Germany from 1977 to 1983. He was press advisor to the Head of State from 1983 to 1984 and head of the information service of Mauritanian Radio and Television from 1986 to 1988. From 1989 to 1993, he was First Advisor, responsible for Communication, at the Mauritanian embassy in Paris, and from 1993 to 1995 he was Ambassador and Permanent Delegate of Mauritania to UNESCO. He was then Ambassador to France from 1995 until he was appointed Ambassador to Morocco in March 2000. He was appointed Minister of Foreign Affairs and Cooperation on January 28, 2001; this was well-received even by papers close to the opposition.

He served as Foreign Minister until Mohamed Ould Tolba was appointed to replace him on October 27, 2002. Ould Abdi was subsequently Ambassador to Japan before being appointed Permanent Representative to the United Nations in April 2004. He presented his credentials as Permanent Representative on July 24, 2004.

He is fluent in Arabic, French, and German.
