= 2026 in Mauritania =

- Decades: 2000s; 2010s; 2020s
- See also: History of Mauritania; List of years in Mauritania

Events in the year 2026 in Mauritania.

== Incumbents ==
- President: Mohamed Ould Ghazouani
- Prime Minister: Mokhtar Ould Djay

== Events ==
- 4 May – MPs Marieme Cheikh Dieng and Ghamou Achour are sentenced to four years' imprisonment by a criminal court in Nouakchott, on charges of insulting President Ghazouani and making claims of his racial discrimination.
- 18 July – A total of 143 people are found dead on board a migrant boat that originated from Gambia and is discovered off the coast of Nouadhibou, after drifting at sea for 25 days.

== Holidays ==
- 1 January – New Year's Day
- 31 March – Eid al-Fitr
- 1 May – Labour Day
- 25 May – Africa Day
- 7 – 8 June – Eid al-Adha
- 27 June – Islamic New Year
- 5 September – The Prophet's Birthday
- 28 November – Independence Day

== Deaths ==
- 12 March – Boubacar Ould Messaoud, 80, human rights activist.
