= Nostalgia X =

Historical motor yacht

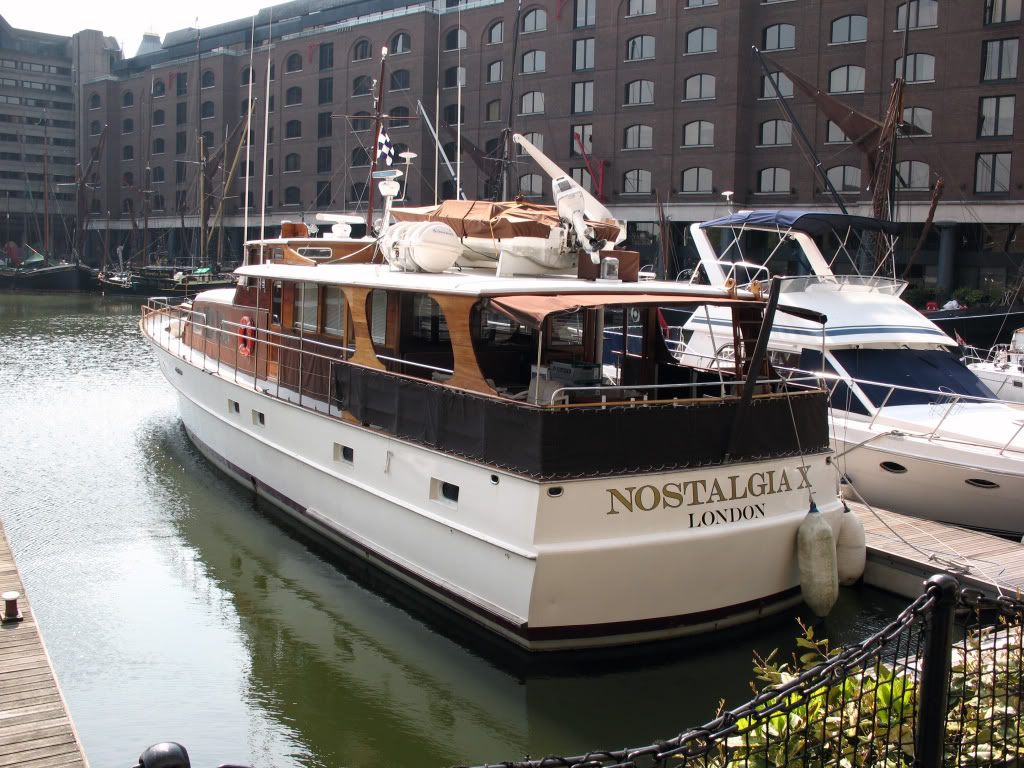
Nostalgia X moored at St. Katharine Docks, London, UK in 2007.

Nostalgia X (originally launched as Timmy Rasch, later names include Heidi III, King Tut, Carefree II, Another Toy II, and The Voice of Sinatra) is a 75-foot (23 m) motor yacht built in 1956 by the Burger Boat Company of Manitowoc, Wisconsin, United States. Newspaper reports from the time of its launch describe the vessel as the world's largest all aluminium yacht, and one of the largest privately owned yachts operating on the Great Lakes.

== Construction and launch ==
The yacht was built by the Burger Boat Company for Green Bay attorney Victor McCormick, at a cost of $400,000, and was launched in 1956 at the company's Manitowoc shipyard.

At its launch the vessel was named Timmy Rasch, after Timothy Rasch, the son of Mrs. Henry Rasch, the craft's sponsor. The yacht has a 17½-foot beam, with accommodations for eight passengers and three crew members. It is powered by twin diesel engines of 300 horsepower each, which provide a cruising speed of about 15 miles per hour and a top speed of approximately 18 miles per hour. It was noted as being the largest aluminium craft of its kind at the time of construction.

During its first decade of use the Timmy Rasch made voyages along the Fox River and Green Bay, into Florida, and operated on Lake Michigan.

== Renaming and Poste ownership ==
In the 1960s the yacht traveled south along the Mississippi River on to Miami, Florida. Upon arriving in Florida, the craft was sold to Florence and Beale Poste, who renamed it Heidi III; a society column described the 75-foot vessel moored at a marina in Palm Beach, Florida as the Poste's "floating home" while fishing and cruising in Florida and Gulf Coast waters.

== Later history ==
During the decades following the Poste's use of the yacht it passed into different ownership and usage, and underwent several phases of refitting, eventually being moored in the United Kingdom. Following numerous name changes it was renamed A Touch of Nostalgia X, now abbreviated to Nostalgia X.

== Reported association with Frank Sinatra ==
Modern brokerage listings and websites state that the yacht was used or chartered by the American singer Frank Sinatra during the late 1960s period when the vessel was based in Palm Beach, Florida
