= Goodrich Transportation Company =

'Goodrich Transit Line or Goodrich Steamship Line or Goodrich Transportation Company or Goodrich Transit Company was a passenger steamship line operating in the Great Lakes region, principally in Lake Michigan in the 19th and early 20th century.

== History ==
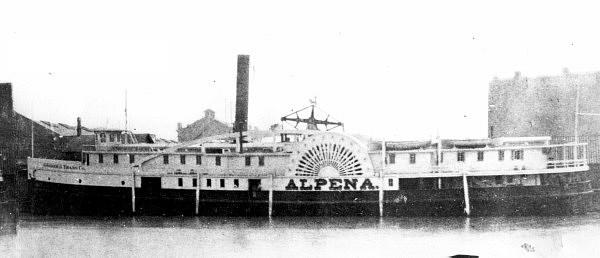
The Alpena pre 1880

The line was founded in 1868 by Albert Edgar Goodrich (born c. 1825–1826, Buffalo, New York — 1885).

Goodrich merged in April 1868 with the Engelmann line, run by Nathan and Michael Engelmann.

What has become The Burger Boat Company, operating as "Rand & Burger Shipyard" and then "Burger & Burger Shipyard" built many steamship ferries for Goodrich (some are pictured below): the 205' S/S Menominee in 1872, the 165' S/S Depere in 1873, the 205' S/S Chicago in 1874, the 180' S/S City of Ludington in 1880, the 203' S/S City of Racine in 1889, the 201' S/S Indiana in 1890 for Goodrich.

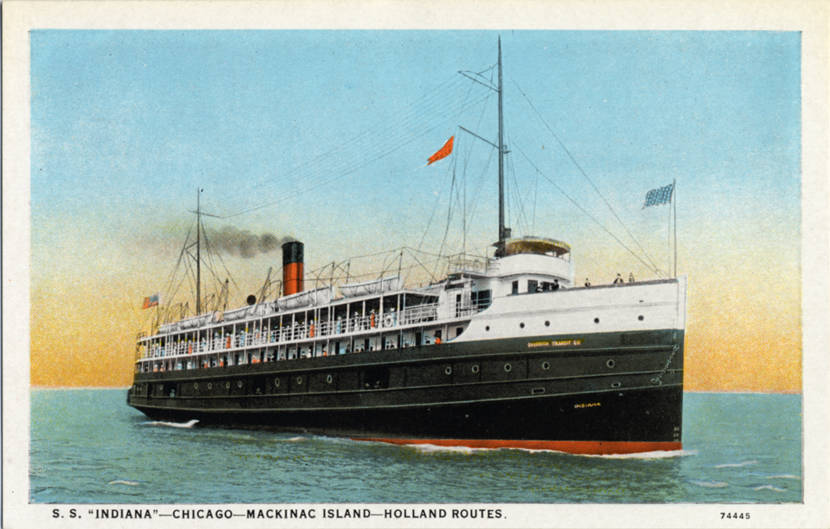
S/S Indiana, Burger & Burger Shipyard, Manitowoc, Wisconsin

The line leased the S.S. Christopher Columbus in 1899 and operated it in Chicago-Milwaukee excursion service for more than 30 years. Many other ships were operated including the Menominee, Muskegon, Chicago, and Milwaukee (many of the ships were named after cities serviced).

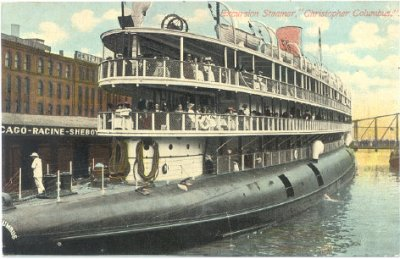
The whaleback steamer S.S. Christopher Columbus at the Goodrich docks in Chicago, Illinois (stern view).

Goodrich was involved in controversy. More than one Goodrich vessel was lost due to shipwreck. The SS Alpena was lost in October 1880 en route from Grand Haven, Michigan to Chicago, Illinois, and a subsequent investigation took the company to task for poor equipment condition and poorly trained crew.

The line was involved in a case versus the Interstate Commerce Commission in 1912, ICC v. Goodrich Transit Co., 224 U.S. 194 (1912), which went all the way to the United States Supreme Court.

On February 4, 1915, the steamer Iowa (built in 1896 on the hull of the Menominee), on its way to the Port of Chicago with the Racine (belonging to Chicago Racine & Milwaukee Steamship Company), sent a radio message at 4:15 a.m., as she was about three miles out, that she had encountered heavy ice. The ice was especially bad that winter with ice freezing up to 25 miles from the port. She had been doing okay, under the command of Gerald E. Stufflebeam, as she approached the ice clogged harbor, until the wind shifted then she was crushed by the ice at 10:00 a.m. As the Iowa sank about two miles out, the 1 passenger and 45 crew left the ship and took refuge on the ice. They started walking toward Chicago as rescuers headed to meet them, including city tugboats.

Goodrich went bankrupt in 1933 and its operations ceased permanently.

== Gallery ==
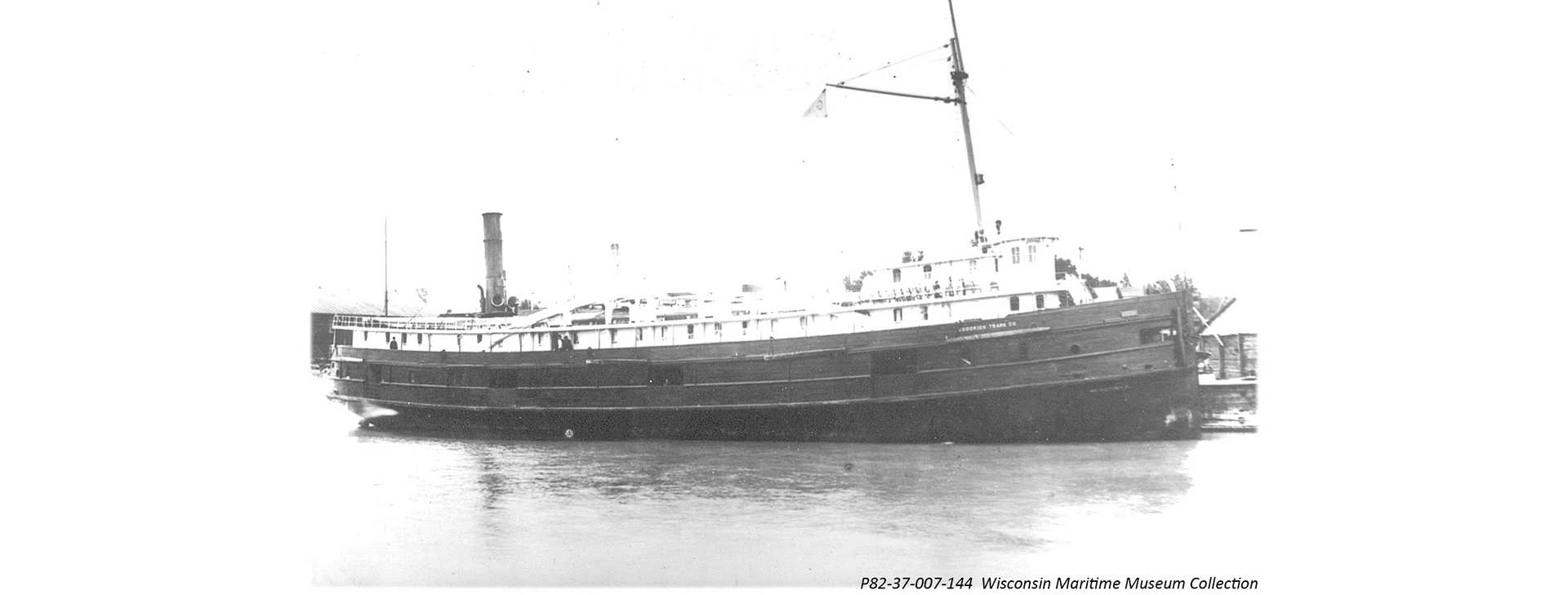
S/S Menominee 205' 1872 Wood, Rand & Burger Shipyard

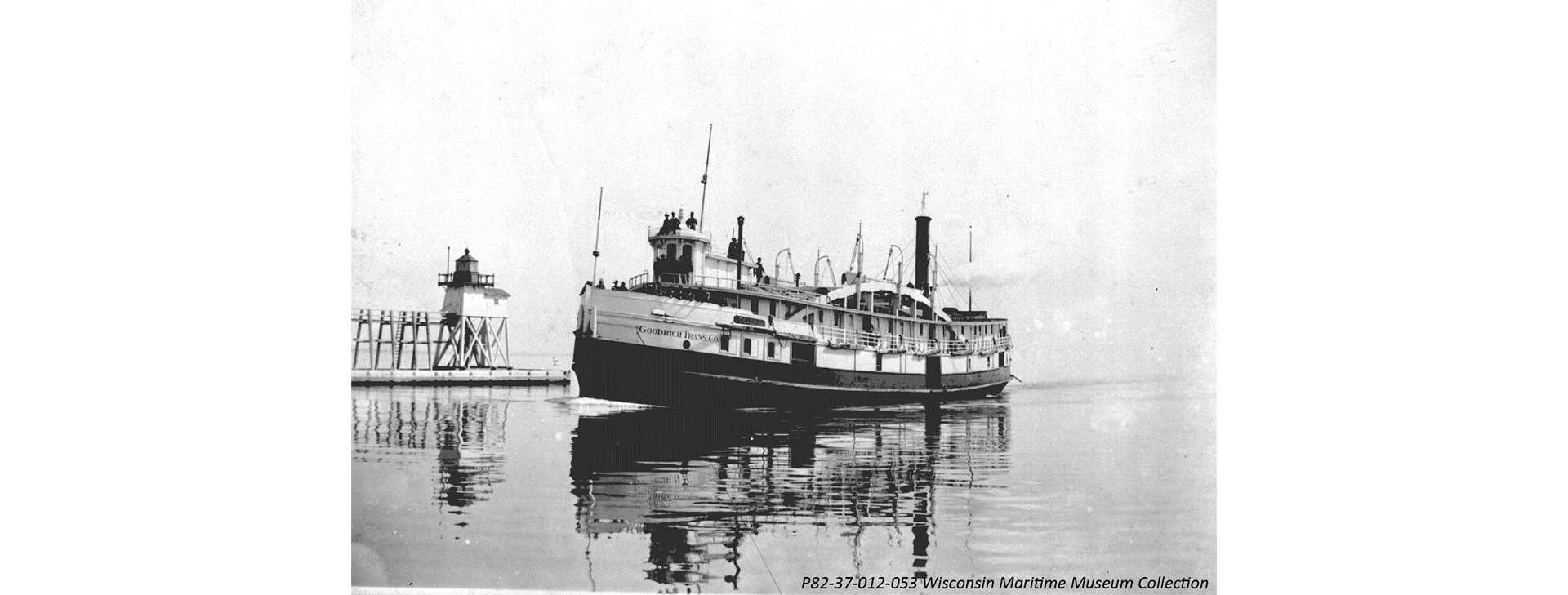
S/S Depere 165' 1873 Wood, Rand & Burger Shipyard

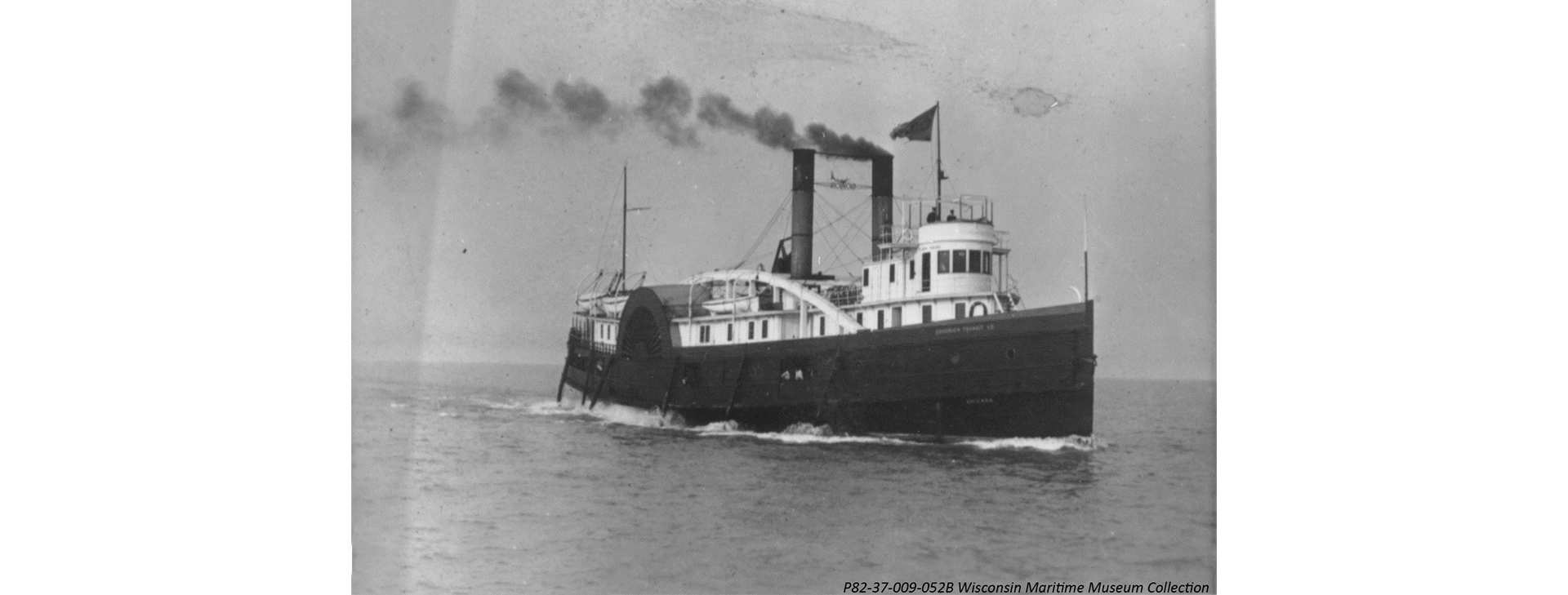
S/S Chicago 205' 1874 Wood, Rand & Burger Shipyard

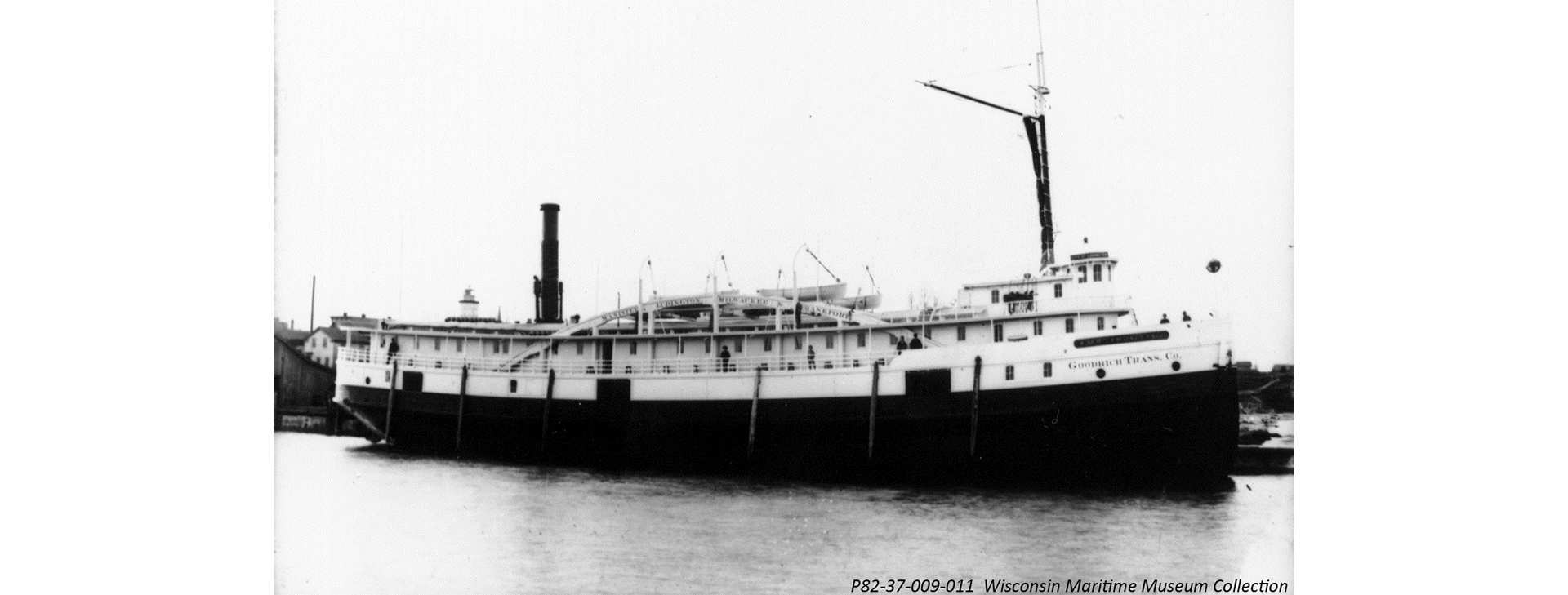
S/S City of Ludington 180' 1880 Wood, Burger & Burger Shipyard

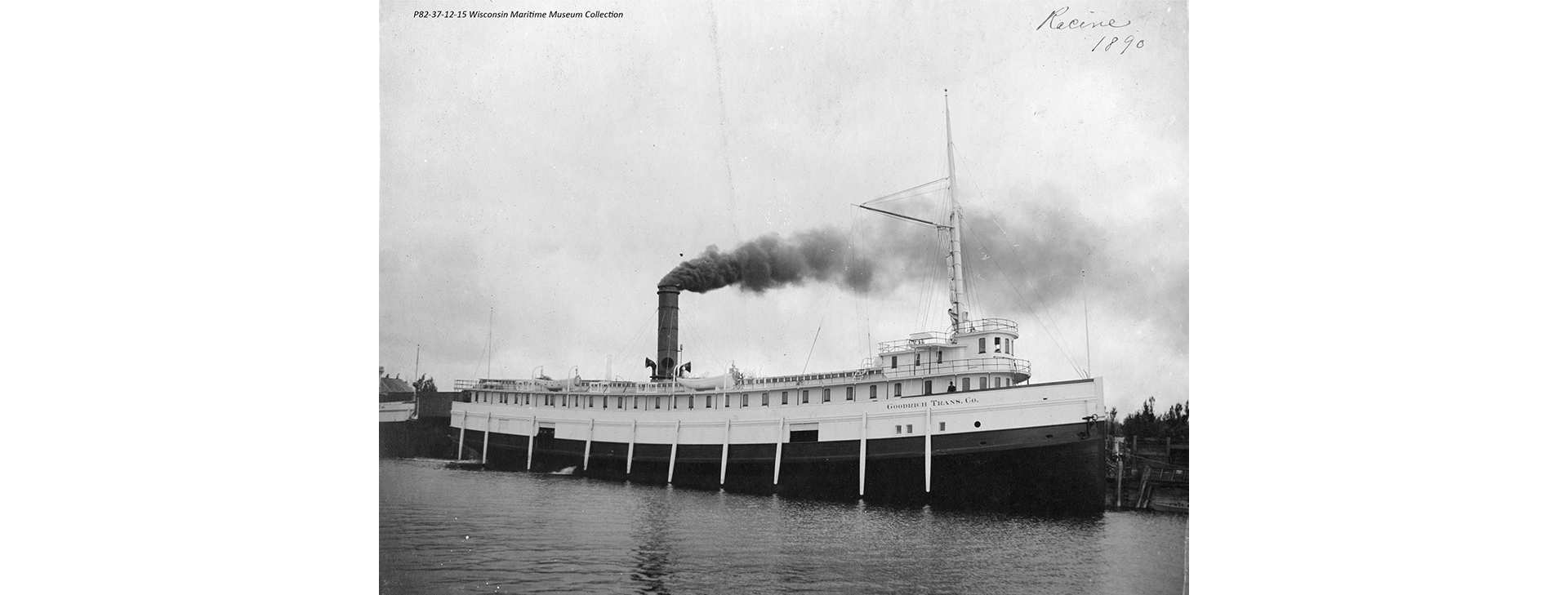
S/S City of Racine 203' 1889 Wood, Burger & Burger Shipyard
