= 1960 in Mauritania =

- Decades: 1940s; 1950s; 1960s; 1970s; 1980s
- See also: History of Mauritania; List of years in Mauritania

The following lists events that happened during 1960 in Mauritania.

== Events ==
=== November ===
- November 28 - The African state of Mauritania became independent shortly after midnight, with Moktar Ould Daddah receiving the transfer of sovereignty from France's Prime Minister, Michel Debre. Daddah declared that "Mauritania ... will never forget what she owes the French people."

=== December ===
- December 4 - The Islamic Republic of Mauritania had applied to be the 100th member of the United Nations, but the request was vetoed in the Security Council by the Soviet Union, on grounds that Mongolia had been denied admission.
