= 2011 in Mauritania =

- Decades: 1990s; 2000s; 2010s; 2020s
- See also: History of Mauritania; List of years in Mauritania

The following lists events that happened during 2011 in Mauritania.

== Incumbents ==
- President: Mohamed Ould Abdel Aziz
- Prime Minister: Moulaye Ould Mohamed Laghdaf

== Events ==
=== February ===
- February 2 - The army in Mauritania destroy a car packed with explosives outside the capital Nouakchott, killing three people suspected of being members of al-Qaeda in the Islamic Maghreb.

=== April ===
- April 25 - Hundreds of people demonstrating during a "day of rage" against the regime of President Mohamed Ould Abdel Aziz are tear gassed by police, while others are arrested and opposition MPs deterred from joining the protests.

=== June ===
- June 25 - Forces from Mauritania and Mali clash with al-Qaeda militants in Mali, destroying a base; several bodies are later found.
