= 2018 in Mauritania =

- Decades: 1990s; 2000s; 2010s; 2020s
- See also: History of Mauritania; List of years in Mauritania

Events in the year 2018 in Mauritania.

== Incumbents ==
- President: Mohamed Ould Abdel Aziz
- Prime Minister: Yahya Ould Hademine (until 29 October); Mohamed Salem Ould Béchir (from 30 October)

== Events ==
- 1 and 15 September – 2018 Mauritanian parliamentary election
- 30 October – Mohamed Salem Ould Béchir took over as prime minister, following the resignation of his predecessor, Yahya Ould Hademine, and his government

== Deaths ==
- 15 January – Moussa Diagana, writer (b. 1946).
- 17 July – Murabit al-Hajj, Islamic cleric and scholar (b. c.1913).
- 11 September – Cheikhna Ould Mohamed Laghdaf, diplomat and politician, Foreign Minister.
