= Mackinaw boat =

Type of small boat used in North America

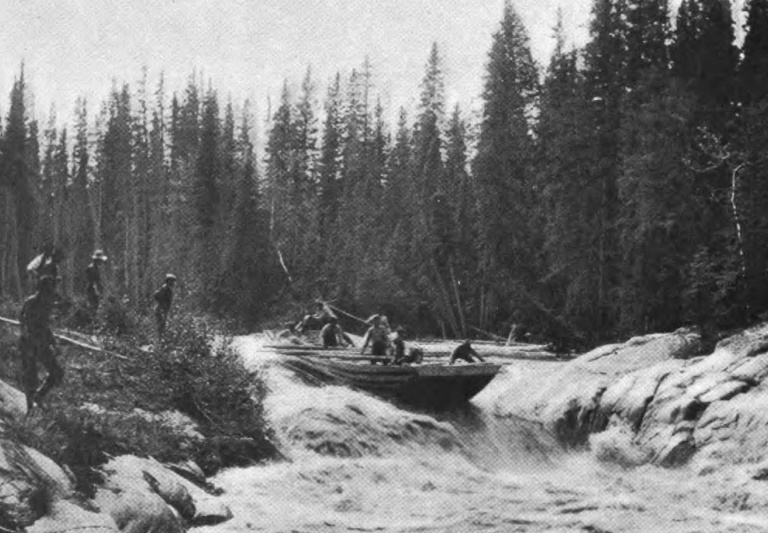
Fur traders in a mackinaw boat or keel-boat on Slave River

The Mackinaw boat is a loose, non-standardized term for a light, open sailboat or rowboat used in the interior of North America during the fur trading era. Within this term two different Mackinaw boats evolved: one for use on the upper Great Lakes, and the other for use on the upper Missouri River and its principal tributaries.

== Ancestors ==
The common origin of all Mackinaw boats was the Native American canoe. With its lightness, speed, cargo capacity, and double-ended flexibility, the canoe delighted fur traders of European origin. However, the Indian canoe design was not stable with a mast and sail. By contrast the Mackinaw boat, or generically "fish boat," held its own with superior sailing qualities in the more open water of the Great Lakes. It could be used, being used for long line, bottom net, and pond-net fishing operations.

== Development ==
The addition of a retractable centerboard made it possible to raise a small mast and sail over a canoe-shaped hull. This breakthrough probably took place some time in the late 17th century or early 18th century at the Straits of Mackinac, hence the name, Mackinaw boat.

With the help of a sail and a favorable wind, a Mackinaw boat could cover an equivalent distance with much greater ease than by rowing with paddles. The Mackinaw boat quickly became a favorite on the upper Great Lakes. By the time of the dominance of the American Fur Company in 1815–1836, the Mackinaw boat was almost the commodity vessel in this region. The bateau was another common freight vessel design of the era, similar to the Mackinaw.

The fur company's men so liked the Mackinaw boat that when asked to build, paddle, and pole light cargo boats up the Missouri River to the company's new trading region in Dakota Territory and Montana Territory, they called the boats mackinaws, even though it was comparatively difficult to move a boat up the Missouri River by sail power. The Missouri River mackinaw may have borne some similarities to the river pirogue developed by French colonists in Louisiana Territory and adapted by the Americans as early as the time of Lewis and Clark.

Mackinaws were seen on the Missouri River as far west as Fort Benton, Montana, the head of navigation.

== Fishing boat ==
With the decline of the fur trade in the Upper Great Lakes in the late 1830s, the Mackinaw boats became traditional fishing boats. With its speed and cargo capacity, the boat was ideally suited for commercial fishing. Prior to refrigeration, it was necessary to haul a catch of cleaned fish rapidly to a fishing station where the catch could be plunged into brine and preserved with salt.

A standard Mackinaw boat used in fishing was 18–24 feet (5.4-7.2m) long. Like its canoe ancestor, the boat was flat-bottomed and could be hauled up onto a beach or pebbled shoreline. The Mackinaw boat could be schooner-rigged, although there was no consistency on this point. The earliest incarnation of what has become The Burger Boat Company, then operating as "H. Burger Shipyard," began producing 20' to 30' versions of the Mackinaw boat out of Manitowoc, Wisconsin by the mid-1860's.

The Mackinaw boat was also used for light point-to-point transport and communication on Lake Huron, Lake Michigan, and, particularly, Lake Superior. In this role, it served into the early 20th century.

== The Mackinaw boat today ==
The Mackinaw boat hull's relative flexibility and efficient movement through the water became less important in the 20th century with the invention of the outboard motor and other powerboat innovations. Few new Mackinaw boats were built after the 1910s. A gaff-rigged Mackinaw boat, the Edith Jane (built about 1909) is preserved inside a sealed shelter on the waterfront in St. Ignace, Michigan; it may be the final Mackinaw boat in existence that was built as a working vessel. A few new Mackinaw boats began to be built after 1990 for explicit purposes of historical re-enactment and skills preservation.
