= The Manitowoc Company =

American cranes manufacturer

The Manitowoc Company, Inc.
- Type: Public
- Traded as: NYSE: MTW; Russell 2000 Component
- Industry: Manufacturing
- Founded: 1902
- Headquarters: 11270 W. Park Place; Milwaukee, Wisconsin, United States
- Key people: Aaron Ravenscroft (CEO)
- Products: Cranes
- Revenue: ▲US$ 1.85 Billion (2018)
- Operating income: ▼US$ (19.3 Million) (2018)
- Net income: ▼US$ (67.1 Million) (2018)
- Total assets: ▼US$ 1.54 Billion (2018)
- Total equity: ▼US$ 601 Million (2018)
- Number of employees: 5,000 (2018)
- Divisions: Manitowoc Cranes
- Website: www.manitowoc.com

The Manitowoc Company, Inc. is an American manufacturer which produces cranes and previously produced commercial refrigeration and marine equipment. It was founded in 1902 and, through its wholly owned subsidiaries, designs, manufactures, markets, and supports mobile telescopic cranes, tower cranes, lattice-boom crawler cranes, and boom trucks under the Grove, Manitowoc, National Crane, Potain, Shuttlelift and Manitowoc Crane Care brand names.

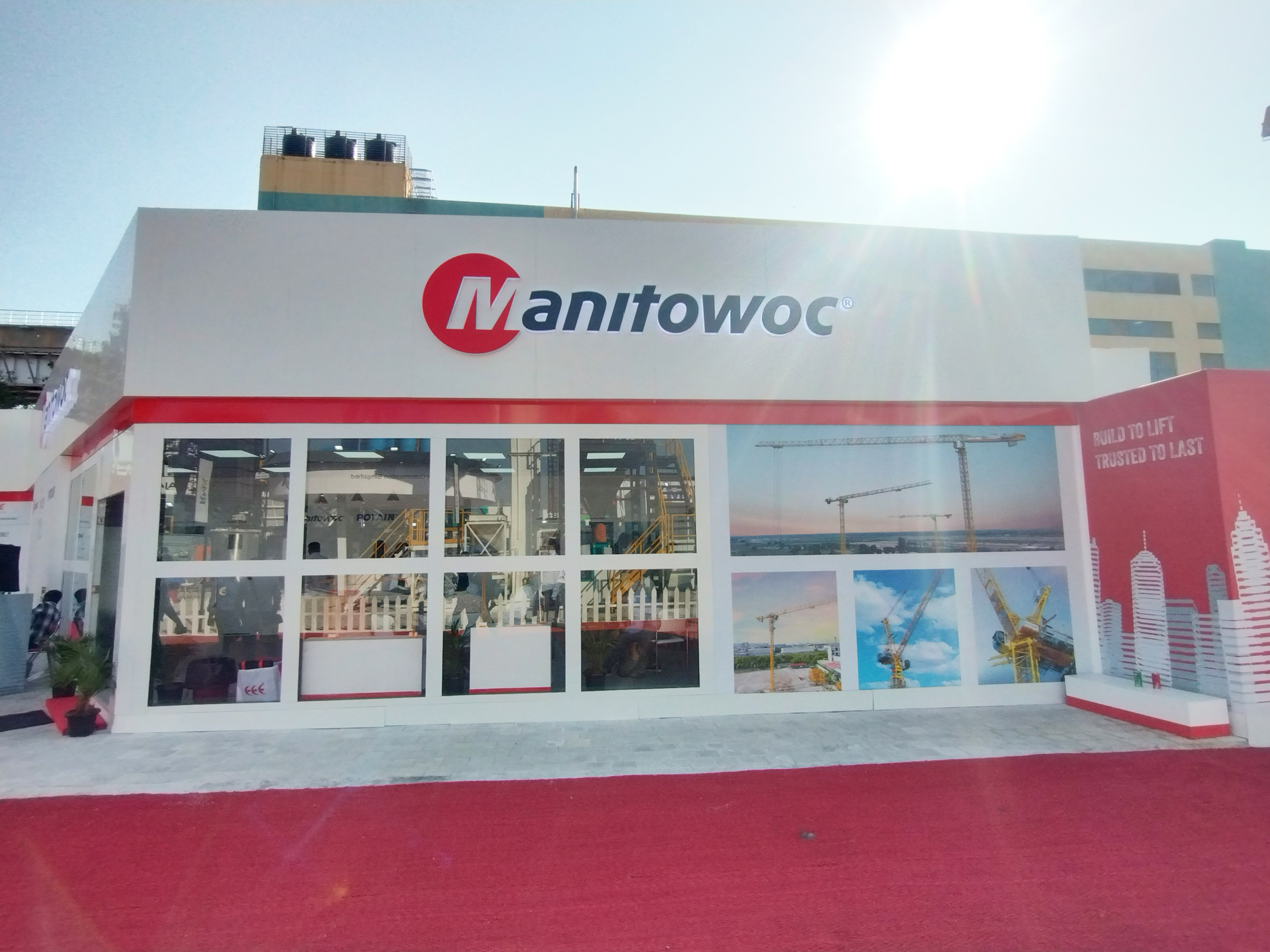
The Manitowoc Company at EXCON 2025, BIEC

== History ==
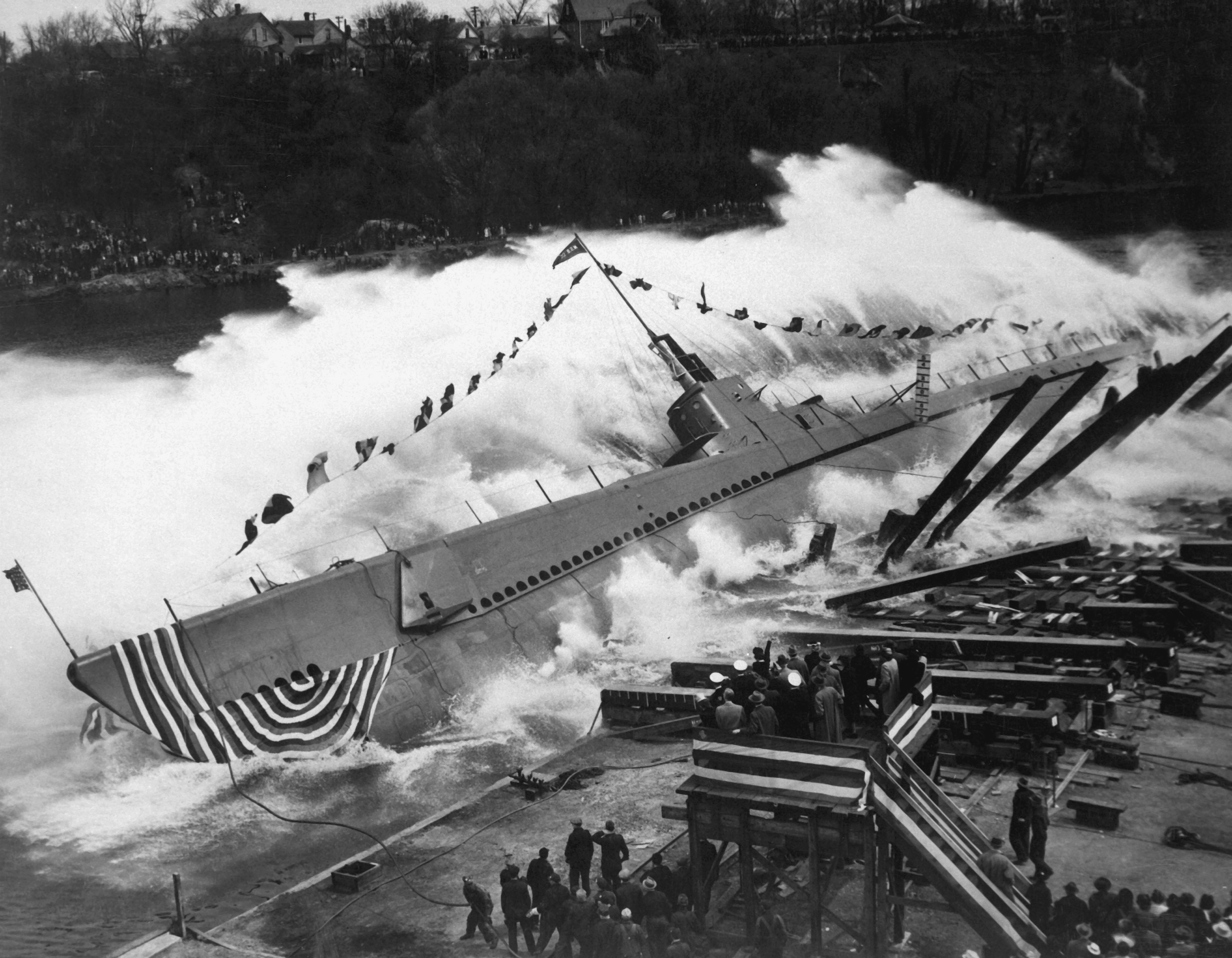
Launch of the USS Robalo (SS-273) at Manitowoc

Manitowoc Company, Inc. was founded in 1902 by Charles West and Elias Gunnell in Manitowoc, Wisconsin. Through the purchase of the Burger & Burger Shipyard and Drydock, it was known as a shipbuilding and ship-repair company under the name Manitowoc Shipbuilding Company. The company grew and diversified, entering the lattice-boom crane business in the mid-1920s and branching into commercial refrigeration equipment shortly after World War II.

During World War II, the Department of the Navy contracted Manitowoc to build a total of 28 submarines, plus the canceled USS Chicolar (SS-464). Before they built the submarines for the Department of the Navy, the company built car ferries.

In November 2002, the company acquired the Grove Crane company from Kidde for approximately $271 million. In March 2016, Manitowoc completed the tax-free spin-off of its food service equipment operations, placing itself as a standalone crane company.

== Divisions ==
=== Cranes ===
Manitowoc produces several lines of cranes to serve the construction, energy, and numerous other industries. The company produces high-capacity lattice-boom crawler cranes, tower cranes, and mobile telescopic cranes for heavy construction, commercial construction, residential construction, energy-related uses, wind farm, infrastructure, duty-cycle, crane-rental applications, among others. It is also a producer of boom trucks. The company has a thriving after-sales business as well, providing service, parts, renovation and training.

Main Brands:

- Manitowoc cranes — Lattice Boom Crawler cranes
- Grove cranes — rough-terrain, truck-mounted, all-terrain, Grove YardBoss, industrial cranes and Shuttlelift carry deck cranes. Grove began producing cranes in 1947 in Shady Grove, Pa.

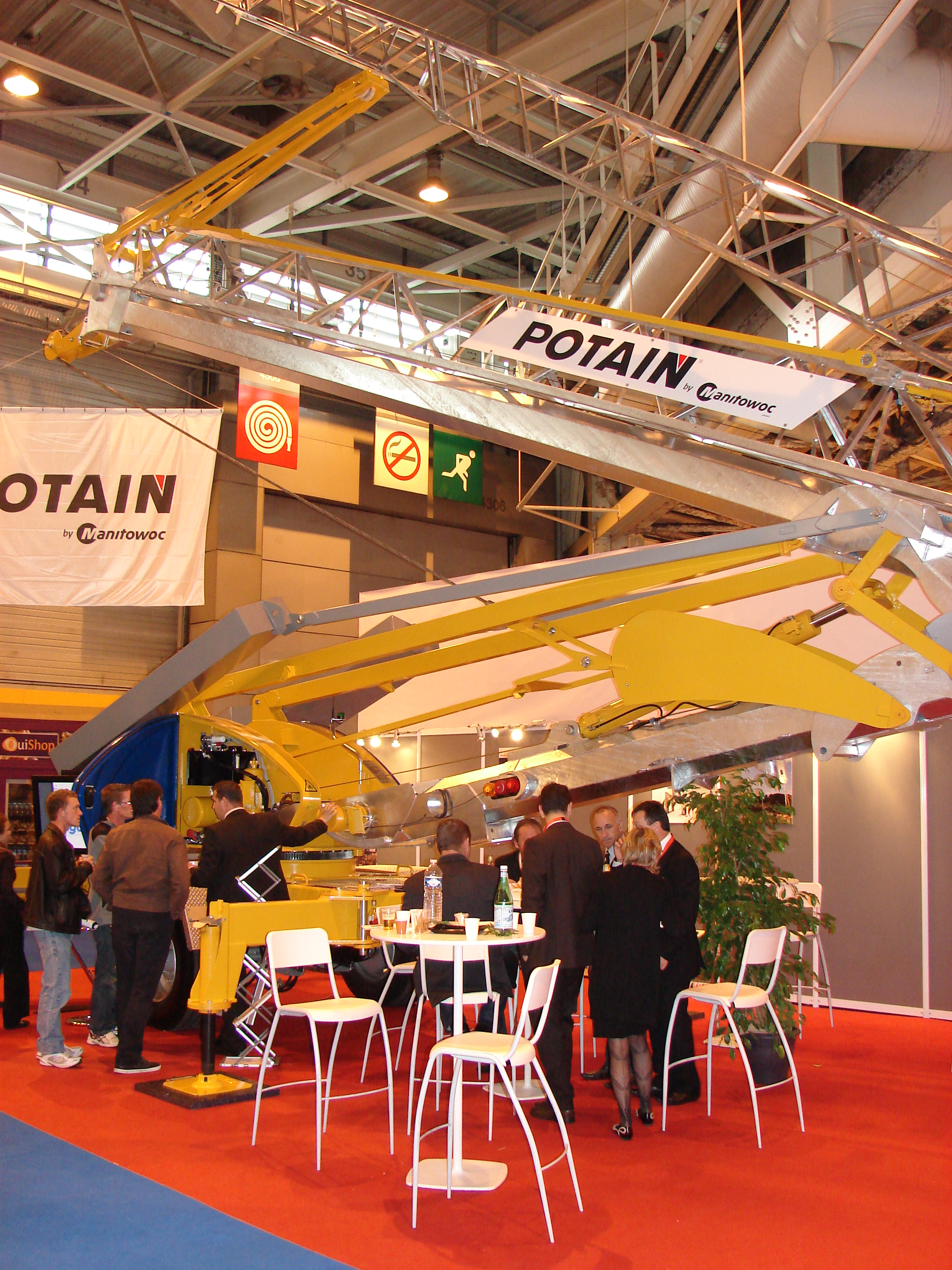
Potain at Reed Exhibitions event Batimat in Villepinte near Paris

- Potain cranes — Tower cranes and self-erecting tower cranes. Founded in La Clayette, France in 1928.
- National Crane — Telescoping boom trucks (articulating line was discontinued at the end of 2008). Founded in Waverly, Nebraska, in 1963 and all production of National Crane Boom Trucks moved to Shady Grove, Pennsylvania, after the acquisition by Manitowoc.

=== Food service ===
Manitowoc Foodservice was a sub-division of the Manitowoc Company, producing ice machines and refrigeration equipment for businesses.

The company acquired SerVend International, a manufacturer of ice and beverage systems equipment for the foodservice industry, in October 1997.

In 2008, the company acquired Enodis PLC, a UK-based supplier of restaurant equipment, including fryers, ovens, and ice machines. Manitowoc Foodservice was required to sell off the ice division of Enodis, including the Ice-O-Matic, Scotsman, Simag, and Barline brands, to address antitrust concerns. The division was sold to American private equity firm Warburg Pincus in 2009. Warburg Pincus later sold the ice division to the Italian Ali Group.

On March 4, 2016, The Manitowoc Company completed a one for one common share split and created Manitowoc Foodservice. As of March 7, 2016 the newly created company began standard stock offerings on the NYSE under the symbol "MFS" Manitowoc Foodservice rebranded itself as Welbilt, Inc. and traded under the symbol "WBT".

The newly formed company was under the leadership of former Manitowoc Company executive Hubertus M. Muehlhaeuser, who had eight direct reports. They were supported by a seven-member board of directors which included Mr. Muehlhaeuser.

Manitowoc Foodservice consisted of 23 global brands that include 12 holding either #1 or #2 position in their respected global markets.

In 2022 Welbilt was acquired by the Italian Group. As part of the acquisition, Manitowoc Ice was sold off to British-American firm Pentair to address antitrust concerns.

=== Marine ===
Manitowoc Marine was a subdivision of the Manitowoc Company, which builds and repairs commercial and military ships at yards in Marinette, Wisconsin; Sturgeon Bay, Wisconsin; and Cleveland, Ohio. The Marinette shipyard, Marinette Marine, built the first Freedom class littoral combat ship for the United States Navy, and the United States Coast Guard Cutter Mackinaw. In August 2008, Manitowoc Marine Division repaired the SS Badger. The Manitowoc Company announced in August 2008 a proposal to sell the marine division to Italian shipbuilder Fincantieri. The sale closed on December 31, 2008.

== Corporate governance ==
- Kenneth W. Krueger — Chairman of the Board, The Manitowoc Company, Inc.
- Aaron H. Ravenscroft — President and Chief Executive Officer, The Manitowoc Company, Inc.
- Brian P. Regan — Executive Vice President and Chief Financial Officer, The Manitowoc Company, Inc.
- Leslie L. Middleton — Executive Vice President Mobile Cranes, The Manitowoc Company, Inc.
- Jennifer L. Peterson — Executive Vice President, General Counsel and Secretary, The Manitowoc Company, Inc.
- James S. Cook — Executive Vice President, Human Resources, The Manitowoc Company, Inc.

== See also ==
- Manitowoc Shipbuilding Company - early subsidiary
