= 2022 in Mauritania =

- Decades: 2000s; 2010s; 2020s
- See also: History of Mauritania; List of years in Mauritania

Events in the year 2022 in Mauritania.

== Incumbents ==
- President: Mohamed Ould Ghazouani
- Prime Minister: Mohamed Ould Bilal
