= 2017 in Mauritania =

- Decades: 1990s; 2000s; 2010s; 2020s
- See also: History of Mauritania; List of years in Mauritania

The following lists events in the year 2017 in Mauritania.

== Incumbents ==
- President: Mohamed Ould Abdel Aziz
- Prime Minister: Yahya Ould Hademine

== Events ==
=== August ===
- 5 August - Mauritanians vote on the constitutional referendum to abolish the Senate and add red bands to the flag. Criticism of President Aziz's attempts at suppressing opposition also arises.
- 7 August - Results from the constitutional referendum show that 85% of Mauritanian voters want to abolish the Senate with a turnout of 53.73%.

== Deaths ==
- 5 May – Ely Ould Mohamed Vall, political and military figure, president 2005–2007 (b. 1953).
