= 2021 in Mauritania =

- Decades: 2000s; 2010s; 2020s
- See also: History of Mauritania; List of years in Mauritania

The following lists events in the year 2021 in Mauritania.

== Incumbents ==
- President: Mohamed Ould Ghazouani
- Prime Minister: Mohamed Ould Bilal

== Events ==
- January 19 – U.S. Immigration and Customs Enforcement deports between four and six asylum seekers to Mauritania on the last day of President Donald Trump′s administration.

== Scheduled events ==
- May 14 – Eid Al Fitr holiday, Muslim ″Breaking of the Fast″.
- November 28 – Independence Day, from France in 1960.

== Culture ==
- April 1 – The Mauritanian, a movie based on Guantanamo Diary by Mohamedou Ould Salahi, who was held and tortured in Guantanamo Bay detention camp, is scheduled for release. The film received two nominations at the 78th Golden Globe Awards.

== See also ==
- Economic Community of West African States
- Community of Sahel–Saharan States
- COVID-19 pandemic in Africa
- African Continental Free Trade Area
- Organisation internationale de la Francophonie
