= 2019 in Mauritania =

- Decades: 1990s; 2000s; 2010s; 2020s
- See also: History of Mauritania; List of years in Mauritania

Events in the year 2019 in Mauritania.

== Incumbents ==
- President: Mohamed Ould Abdel Aziz (until 1 August), Mohamed Ould Ghazouani (starting 1 August)
- Prime Minister: Mohamed Salem Ould Béchir (until 1 August), Ismail Ould Bedde Ould Cheikh Sidiya (starting 1 August)

== Events ==
- 22 June – the 2019 Mauritanian presidential election took place. Mohamed Ould Ghazouani was elected, with 52 percent of the vote.

== Deaths ==
- 2 March – Med Hondo, film director, screenwriter and actor (b. 1936).
- 16 March – Mohamed Mahmoud Ould Louly, military officer and politician, President of Mauritania and Chairman of the Military Committee for National Salvation (b. 1943).
