= 2024 in Mauritania =

- Decades: 2000s; 2010s; 2020s
- See also: History of Mauritania; List of years in Mauritania

Events in the year 2024 in Mauritania.

== Incumbents ==
- President: Mohamed Ould Ghazouani
- Prime Minister:
  - Mohamed Ould Bilal
  - Mokhtar Ould Djay (from 2 August 2024)

== Events ==
- June 29: 2024 Mauritanian presidential election: Incumbent President Mohamed Ould Ghazouani is reelected with an outright majority for a second term.
- July 1: Eighty-nine people are killed after a migrant boat sink near Ndiago.
- July 22: Twenty-five people are killed after a migrant boat travelling from the Gambia capsizes near Nouakchott.
- July 24: 2024 Nouakchott migrant boat disaster: Fifteen people are killed, and more than 195 others are missing after a boat carrying migrants capsizes near Nouakchott.
