= 2020 in Mauritania =

- Decades: 2000s; 2010s; 2020s
- See also: History of Mauritania; List of years in Mauritania

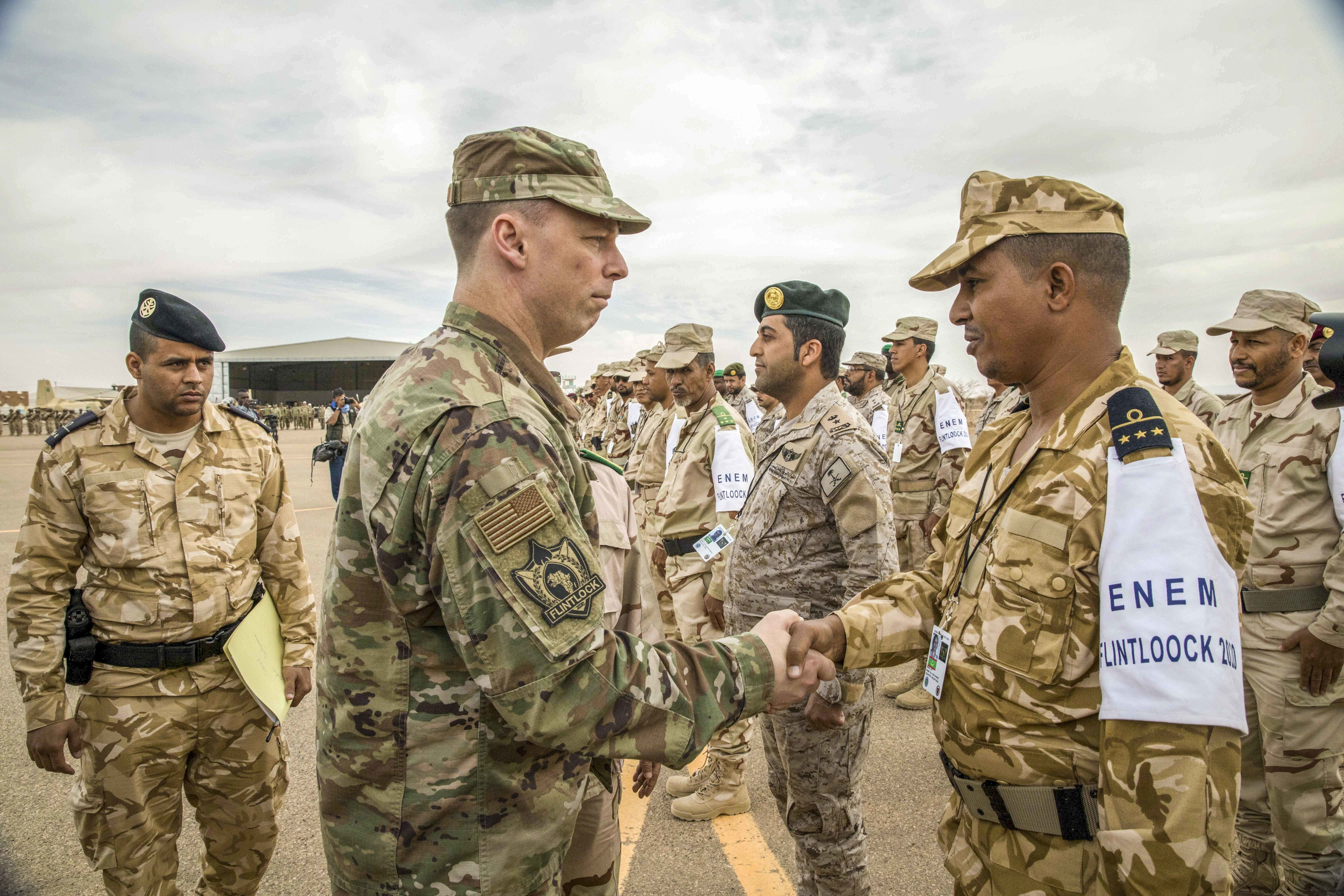

The following lists events in the year 2020 in Mauritania.

== Incumbents ==
- President: Mohamed Ould Ghazouani
- Prime Minister: Ismail Ould Bedde Ould Cheikh Sidiya (until 6 August), Mohamed Ould Bilal (starting 6 August)

== Events ==
- 1 January - New Year's Day, Public holidays in Mauritania
- 13 March – The first case of COVID-19 in the country was confirmed.
- 30 March – The first COVID-19 death in the country is reported.
- 1 May - Labour Day, public holiday
- 23 May - Eid al-Fitr (End of Ramadan), public holiday
- 25 May - African Liberation Day, public holiday
- 31 July – Tabaski (Feast of the Sacrifice), public holiday
- 18 August – Former president Mohamed uld Abdel Aziz (2008-2019) is arrested on charges of corruption.
- 21 August - Islamic New Year, public holiday
- 16 December – Couscous is added to the UNESCO Intangible Cultural Heritage Lists.

== Scheduled events ==
- 29 October - Mawlid (Prophet's Birthday), public holiday
- 28 November - Independence Day (from France, 1960), public holiday

== Deaths ==
- November 23 – Sidi Ould Cheikh Abdallahi, 82, politician, President (2007–2008).

== See also ==
- Economic Community of West African States
- Community of Sahel–Saharan States
- COVID-19 pandemic in Africa
- Organisation internationale de la Francophonie
