= 2003 in Mauritania =

- Decades: 1980s; 1990s; 2000s; 2010s; 2020s
- See also: History of Mauritania; List of years in Mauritania

This article is a list of events in the year 2003 in Mauritania.

== Incumbents ==
- President: Maaouya Ould Sid'Ahmed Taya
- Prime Minister:
  - Cheikh El Avia Ould Mohamed Khouna
  - Sghair Ould M'Bareck

== Events ==
- June 8-10: A failed military coup attempted to overthrow the President Maaouya Ould Sid'Ahmed Taya.
- September 19: The Maritime delimitation treaty between Mauritania and Cape Verde was signed.
- November 7: President Maaouya Ould Sid'Ahmed Taya is reelected for another term; he won the election with 67% of the popular vote.

== Sports ==
- ASC Nasr de Sebkha won the Ligue 1 Mauritania football championship.
