= 2012 in Mauritania =

- Decades: 1990s; 2000s; 2010s; 2020s
- See also: History of Mauritania; List of years in Mauritania

The following lists events that happened during 2012 in Mauritania.

== Incumbents ==
- President: Mohamed Ould Abdel Aziz
- Prime Minister: Moulaye Ould Mohamed Laghdaf

== Events ==
=== March ===
- March 17 - Mauritania's state information agency announces that Abdullah Senussi, Muammar Gaddafi's former intelligence chief, has been arrested at the airport in Nouakchott upon arrival from Morocco.

=== April ===
- April 3 - Thousands of people attend demonstrations in Mauritania calling for the resignation of President Mohamed Ould Abdelaziz.

=== September ===
- September 5 - Mauritania extradites former Libyan intelligence chief Abdullah Senussi, who was arrested in the capital Nouakchott in March after fleeing Libya during the civil war in 2011. The United States insist on a fair trial for the suspect, a "milestone in [Libya's] democratic transition".

=== October ===
- October 13 - President Mohamed Ould Abdel Aziz is shot.
- October 14 - Mohamed Ould Abdel Aziz, shot by troops yesterday, is flown to France.

=== November ===
- November 25 - President Mohamed Ould Abdel Aziz returns to Mauritania after being in France for five weeks recovering after being shot by a soldier on 13 October.
