= 2024 Nouakchott migrant boat disaster =

Nautical disaster off the coast of Mauritania

- Date: July 22, 2024
- Location: Off the coast of Nouakchott, Mauritania
- Cause: Capsizing
- Deaths: 15+
- Injuries: 10
- Missing: 195

The 2024 Nouakchott migrant boat disaster occurred on 22 July 2024, when a pirogue carrying hundreds of migrants capsized near the coast of Nouakchott, the capital and largest city of Mauritania. At least 15 migrants were killed in the disaster, with over 195 more categorized as missing.

== Background ==
Reporting from the International Organization for Migration (IOM) stated that the disaster occurred at a time when migration from the "West Atlantic Route" was increasing, with over 19,700 migrants landing in the Canary Islands irregularly by the end of July 2024 in contrast to the 7,590 that crossed at the same time in 2023. It reported that over 4,500 deaths or disappearances on this route were catalogued since 2014, with 2023 having its second deadliest year on record with over 1,950 deaths. At least 76 boats containing 6,130 living migrants arrived in Mauritania from June 2024 to the time of the disaster, and 190 migrants were reported dead or missing.

The wooden fishing pirogue boarded passengers from The Gambia on 17 July 2024. The IOM reported that the vessel was carrying roughly 300 people at the time of the disaster.

== Disaster ==
On 22 July 2024, the migrant-carrying vessel capsized near the coast of Nouakchott, the capital of Mauritania, causing at least 15 fatalities with over 195 more people reported as missing. The IOM stated that the capsizing occurred during a two-day period of strong winds.

The Mauritanian coastguard reported that they rescued over 120 migrants from the capsized ship and the waters, among them were four children who were separated from their guardians or were unaccompanied. Ten people required emergency transfer to regional hospitals.
