= 2025 in Mauritania =

- Decades: 2000s; 2010s; 2020s
- See also: History of Mauritania; List of years in Mauritania

Events in the year 2025 in Mauritania.

== Incumbents ==
- President: Mohamed Ould Ghazouani
- Prime Minister: Mokhtar Ould Djay

== Events ==
- 20 March – The International Charity Organization announces plans to build a city in Mauritania.
- 27 March – The World Bank approves the Mauritania Development of Energy Resources and Mineral Sector Support Project (DREAM).
- 4 April – Mauritania Airlines sigs an agreement with Royal Air Maroc.
- 14 May – Former president Mohamed Ould Abdel Aziz is sentenced to 15 years' imprisonment by an appeals court for corruption and money laundering.
- 29 May – Former finance minister Sidi Ould Tah is elected as president of the African Development Bank.
- 26 August – A boat carrying around 160 migrants to Spain from the Gambia capsizes north of Nouakchott, killing at least 69 people and leaving 17 survivors, with the rest missing.
- 16 December – US President Donald Trump issues a proclamation imposing partial travel restrictions on Mauritanian nationals travelling to the United States.

== Holidays ==
- 1 January – New Year's Day
- 31 March – Eid al-Fitr
- 1 May – Labour Day
- 25 May – Africa Day
- 7 – 8 June – Eid al-Adha
- 27 June – Islamic New Year
- 5 September – The Prophet's Birthday
- 28 November – Independence Day

== Deaths ==
- 2 September – Moustapha Sall, 58, football manager (national team).
