= Burger Boat Company =

American boat manufacturer

- Founded: 1863; 163 years ago
- Headquarters: Manitowoc, Wisconsin, U.S.
- Key people: Jim Ruffolo, President/CEO
- Products: Custom pleasure yachts
- Number of employees: 350
- Website: www.burgerboat.com

The Burger Boat Company, of Manitowoc, Wisconsin, United States, is a builder of custom-designed, hand-built pleasure cruisers. The company also produces commercial vessels and has produced military vessels in the past. It is the second oldest private, family founded, shipyard and pleasure cruiser producer in the United States after Hodgdon, and the fifth oldest in the world.

== History ==
=== H. Burger Shipyard ===
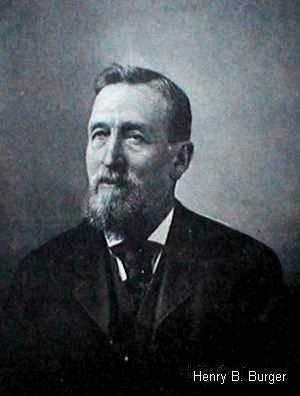
Henry B Burger Sr.

Henry B. Burger Sr. founded the H. Burger Shipyard in 1863 after moving to Manitowoc, WI, from Milwaukee where was employed with the Wolf & Davidson Shipyard as a builder. In Manitowoc, he found a pool of European immigrant craftsmen to employ. The demand for small fishing boats for local fishermen prompted the production 20' to 30' Mackinaw style vessels.

=== Rand & Burger Shipyard ===
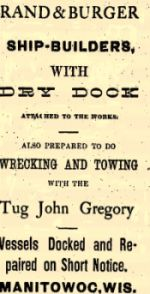
Rand & Burger Shipyard Advertisement

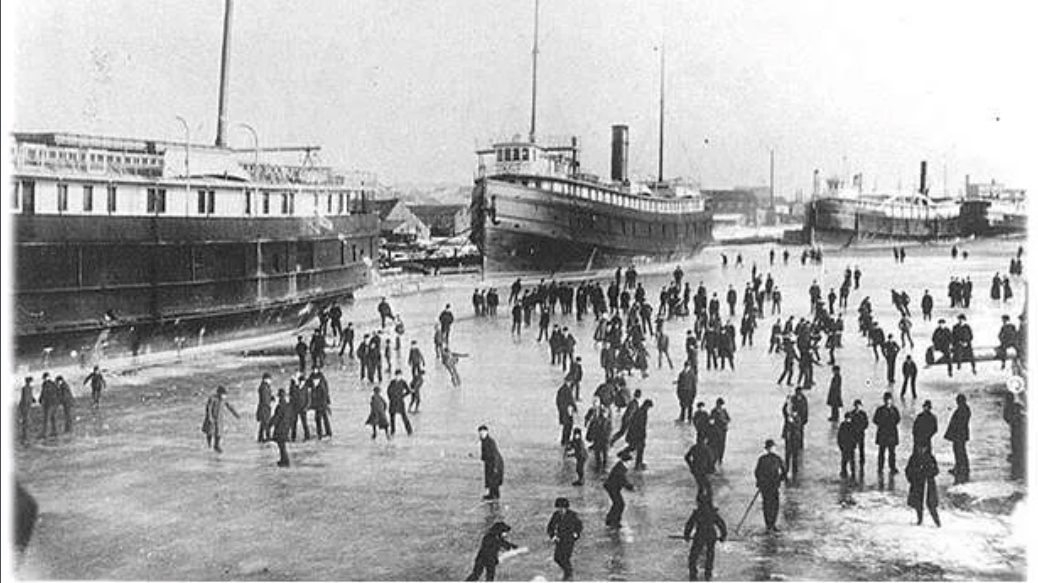
Three Burger Steamship Ferries 1890

The company grew and in an effort to leverage the building of larger steamships in 1872–1873 Henry Burger Sr. took on a partner, Greeneleaf Rand, an established shipbuilder in Manitowoc, having been superintendent of the Manitowoc Dry Dock Company and partner at Hanson & Rand Shipyard, forming Rand & Burger Shipyard until Rand's death in 1885. This company, and its next incarnation Burger & Burger Shipyard, produced many steamship ferries for the Goodrich Transportation Company.

=== Burger & Burger Shipyard ===
A year after the passing of G. Rand, in 1886, Henry Sr. took on his nephew George B. Burger II to form Burger & Burger Shipyard. Around this time the production of new wooden sailing ships was waning, and the Burgers foresaw the shift to maintenance, rehabilitation, and service within the industry, purchasing, in Manitowoc, the only dry dock between there and Detroit, none existed at the time on Lake Superior. Burger launched the last full-rigged schooner built on the Great Lakes in 1889, S/V CORA A. In 1890, Burger built and launched the 201' ferry S/S INDIANA for the Goodrich Transportation Company, the largest and by far most successful passenger steamship line on the Great Lakes.

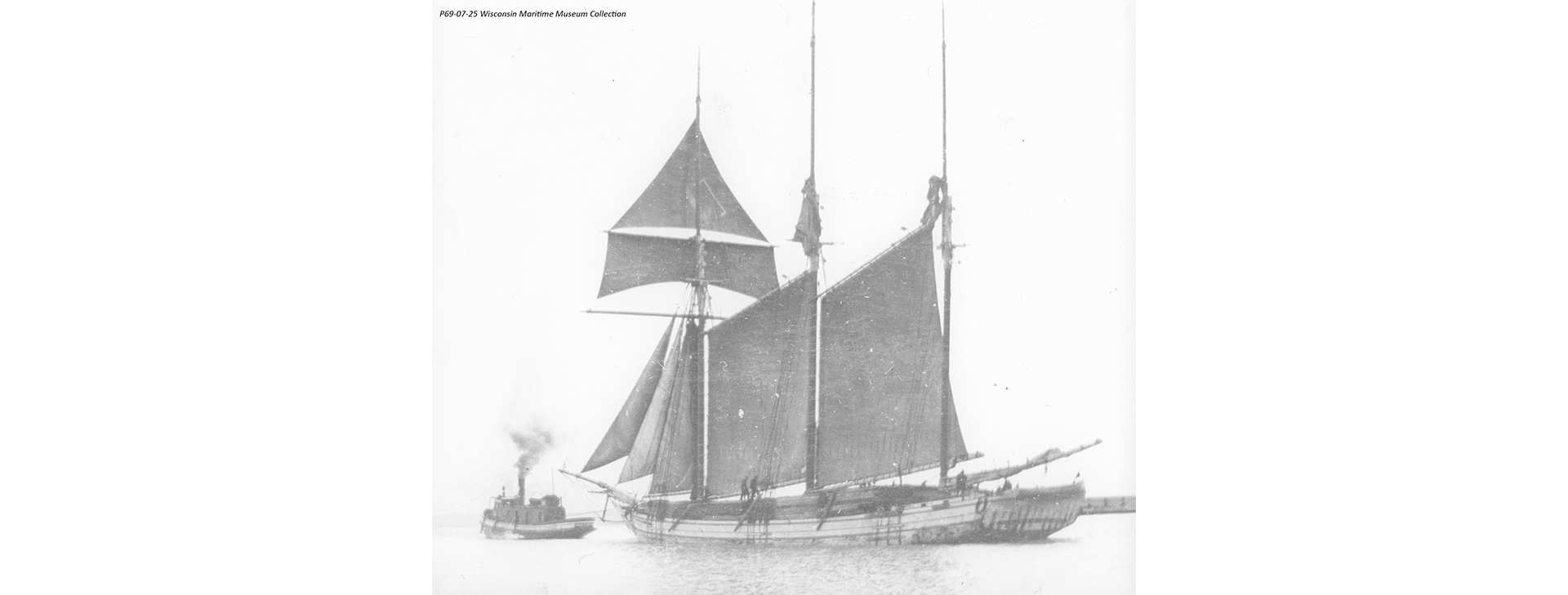
CORA A 149" 1889 Wood, Burger & Burger Shipyard

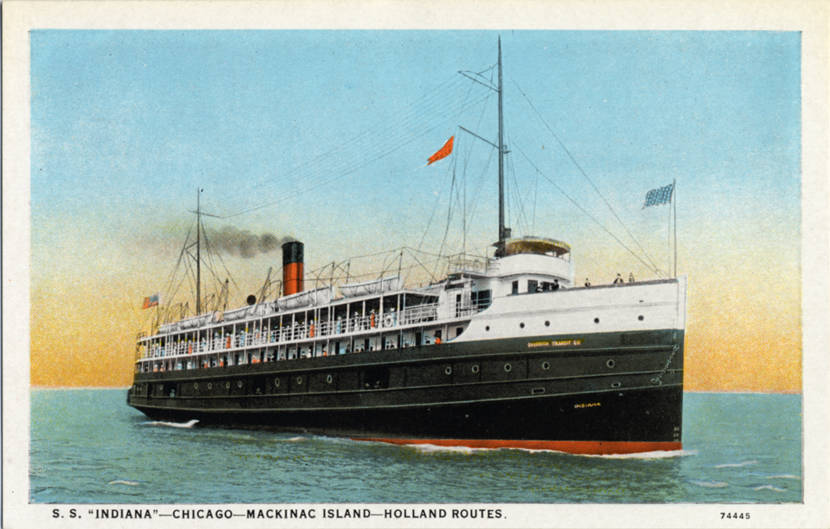
S/S Indiana built by the Burger & Burger Shipyard

In 1902 Henry B. Burger Sr. and George Burger II of the "Burger & Burger Shipyard" sellout to the Manitowoc Drydock Company owned by Chicago Industrialists Elias Gunnell and Charles C. West, that would later become the Manitowoc Shipbuilding Company, now The Manitowoc Company.

=== Henry B. Burger Shipyard ===
Around this time Henry Sr.'s other nephew, and George II's younger brother, Henry B. Burger II founds, on the opposite side of the Manitowoc River, the Henry B. Burger Shipyard - the current location of Burger Boat Company. Focusing on pleasure cruisers rather than steamers like his kinsmen across the river, innovations that came out of his shipyard were visionary, installing gasoline engines produced by Kahlenberg Brothers of Two Rivers, Wisconsin. Their first motor vessel was launched in 1901, the VERNON JR. an 85' cruiser; and within the decade the company was building 80', 90', and 100' wooden cruisers and had established a reputation for building the world's finest custom motor yachts.

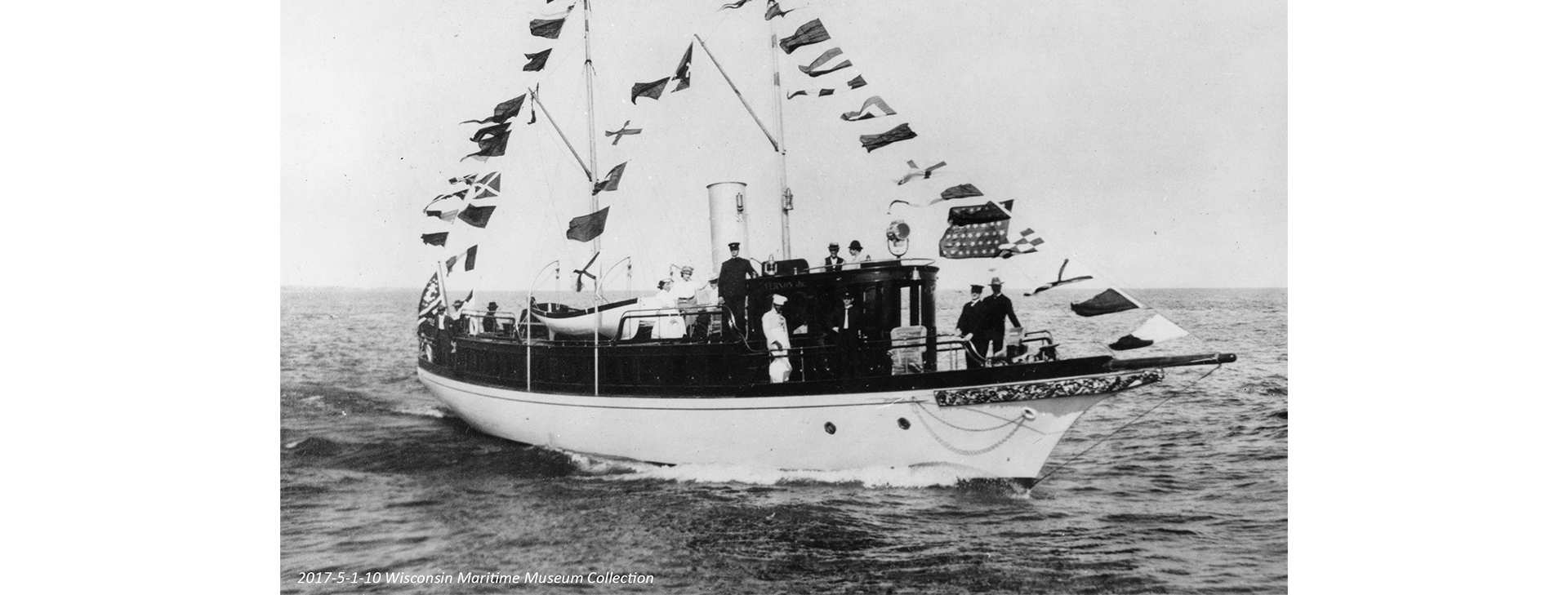
M/V Vernon Jr., 80' 00", Hull-Wood, 1901, Henry B Burger Jr Shipyard

This yard continued on until Henry's death in 1914. In 1915 his wife, Mammie Oertling Burger, and four children: Henry C., George M., Walter W., and Caroline G. Burger, incorporated The Burger Boat Company.

=== The Burger Boat Company Inc. ===
Burger built the USA's first steel-hulled yacht, the 24m S/V Tamaris in 1938, with newly developed electric arc welding technology and began using welded aluminum in 1952 with the 11m Virginia.

Of the 500 yachts built in the company's history, there are about 250 still in service.

David Ross and partner Jim Ruffolo, Chicago entrepreneurs, acquired the bankrupt company in 1993. Ross retired in 2007. Burger is now headed by Jim Ruffolo, President/CEO. About 350 employees build an average of three yachts a year.

== Boats ==
- Rhodes 77

== Gallery ==
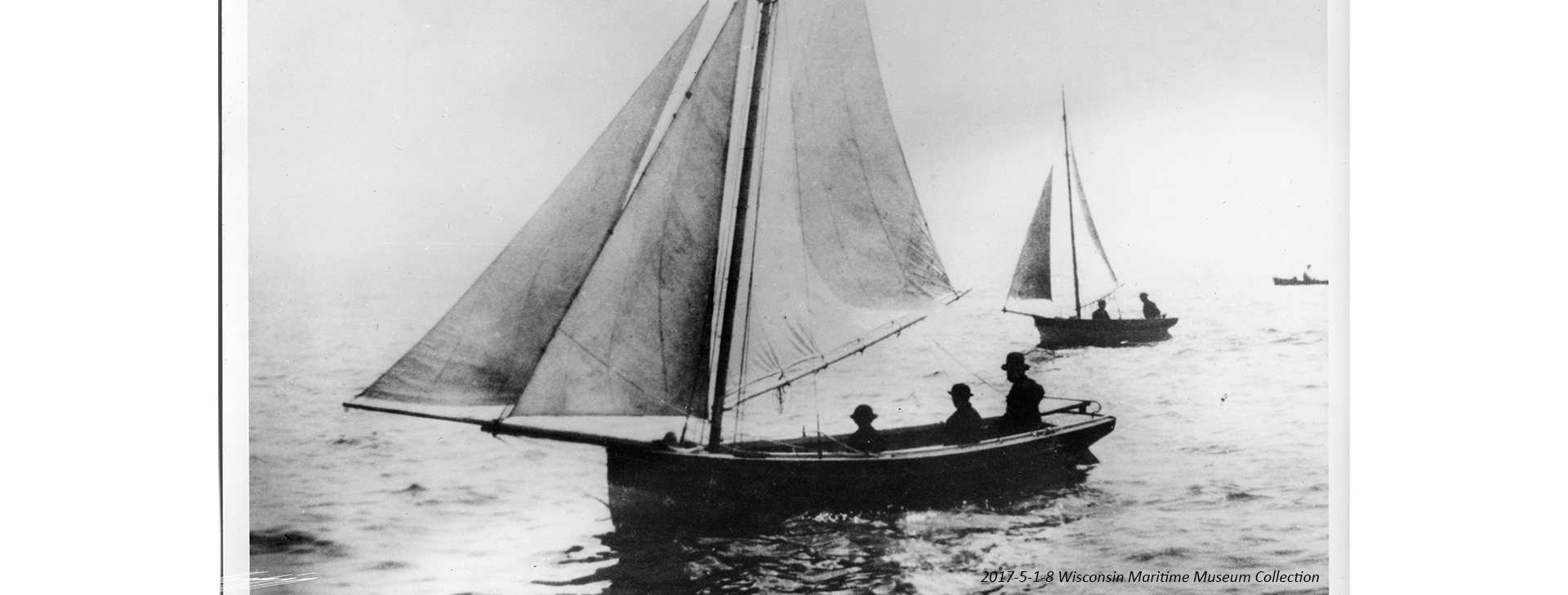
S/V Dolphin 1886 20' Wood, H. Burger Shipyard, Classic Mackinaw boat

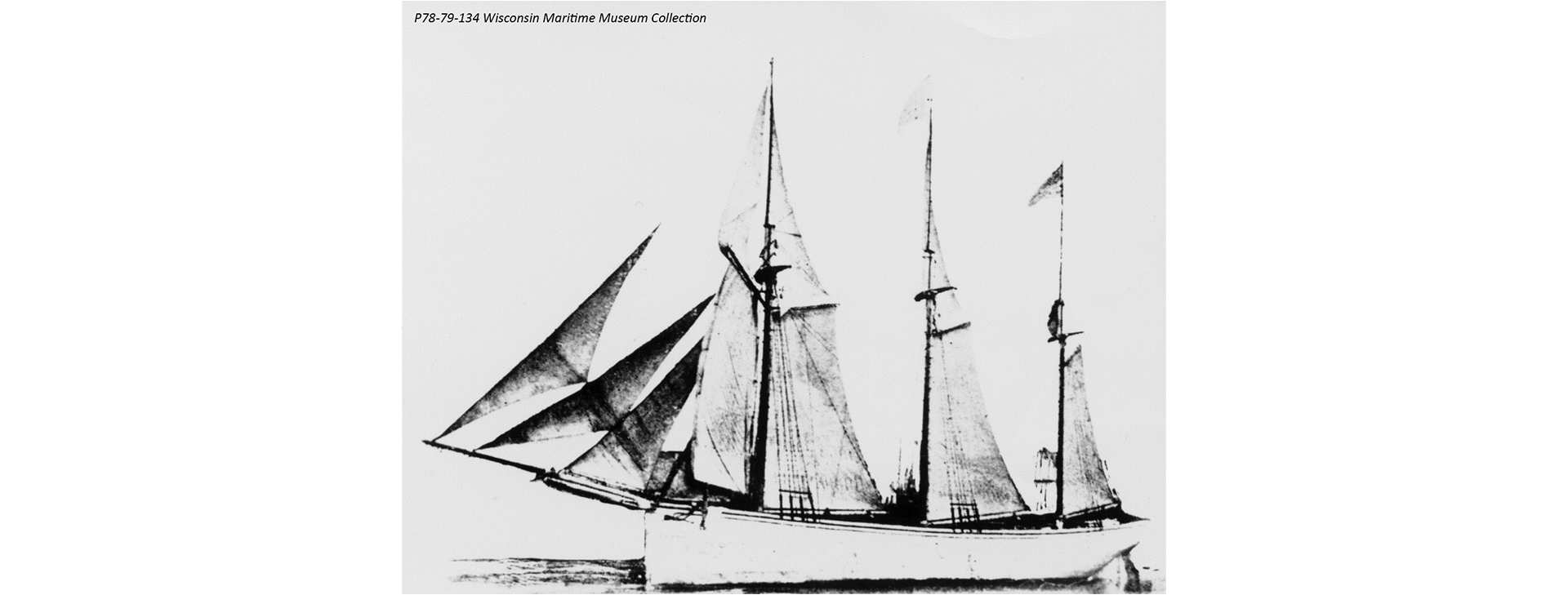
S/V City of Manitowoc 138" 1872 Wood, Greene-Rand, Burger Shipyard

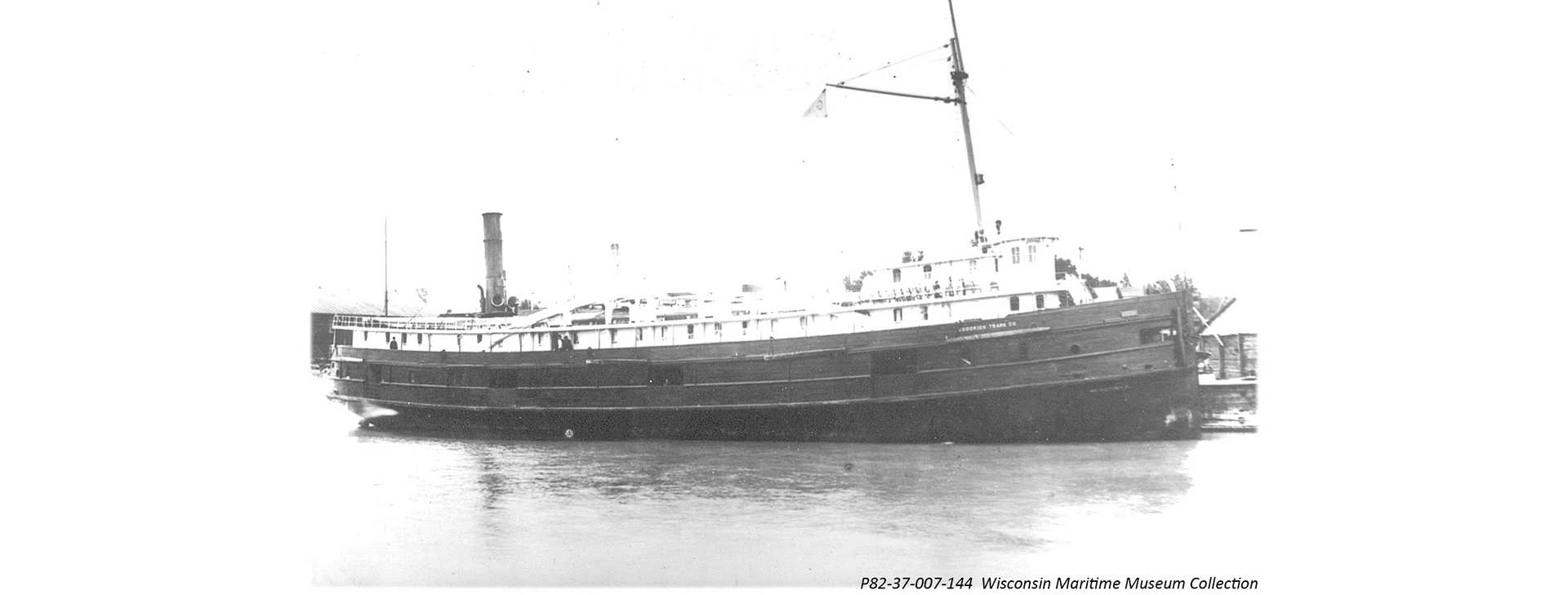
S/S Menominee 205' 1872 Wood, Greene-Rand, Burger Shipyard for Goodrich Transportation Company

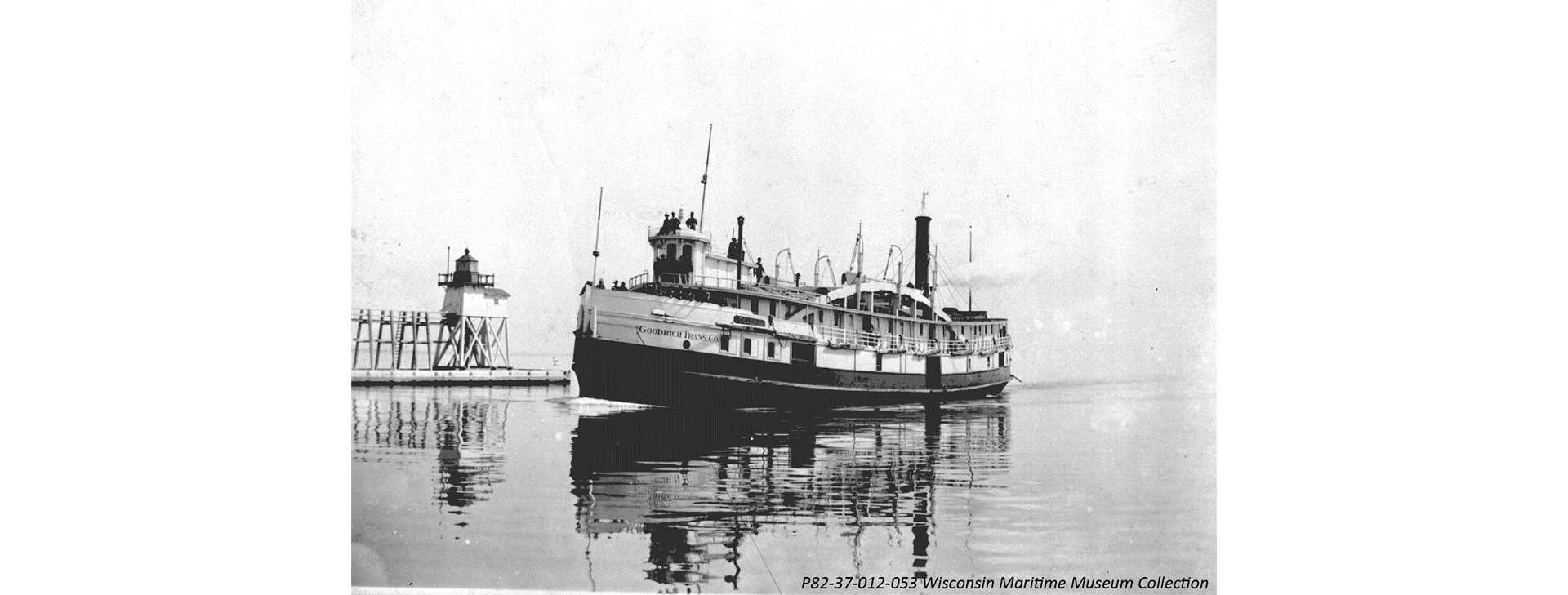
S/S Depere 165' 1873 Wood, Greene-Rand & Burger Shipyard for the Goodrich Transportation Company

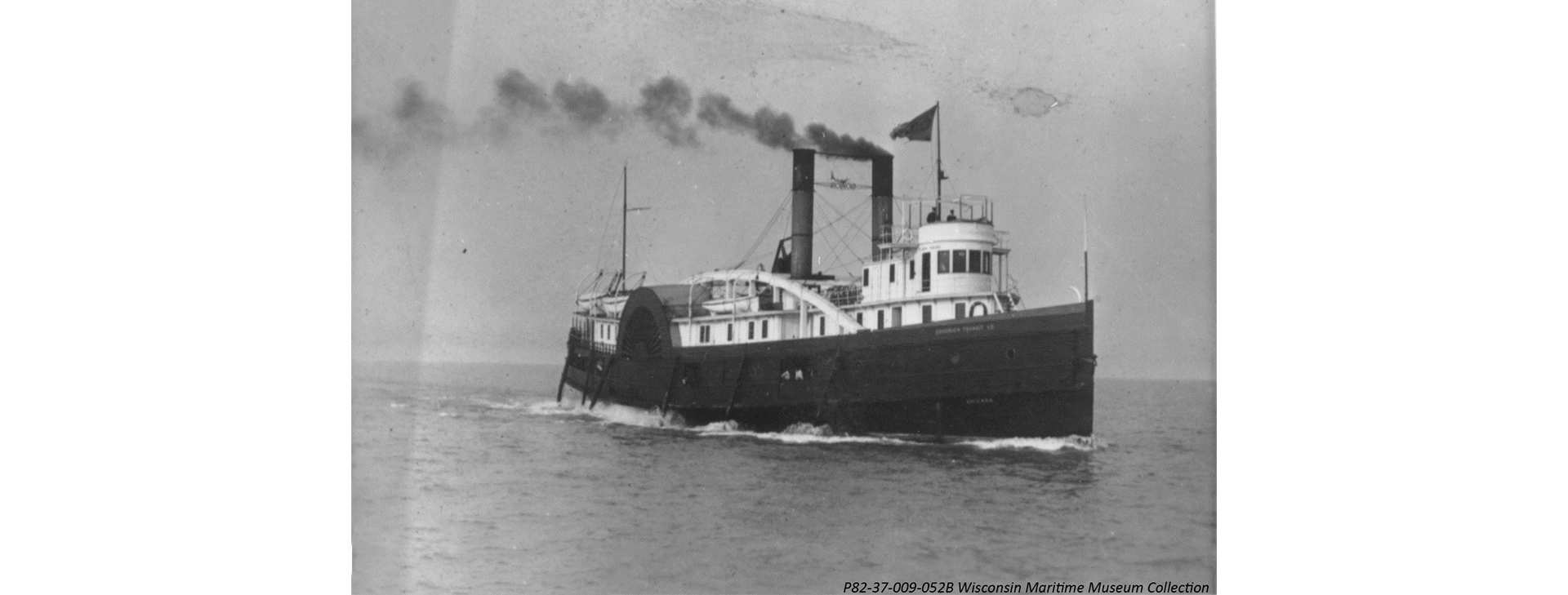
S/S Chicago 205' 1874 Wood, Greene-Rand & Burger Shipyard for the Goodrich Transportation Company

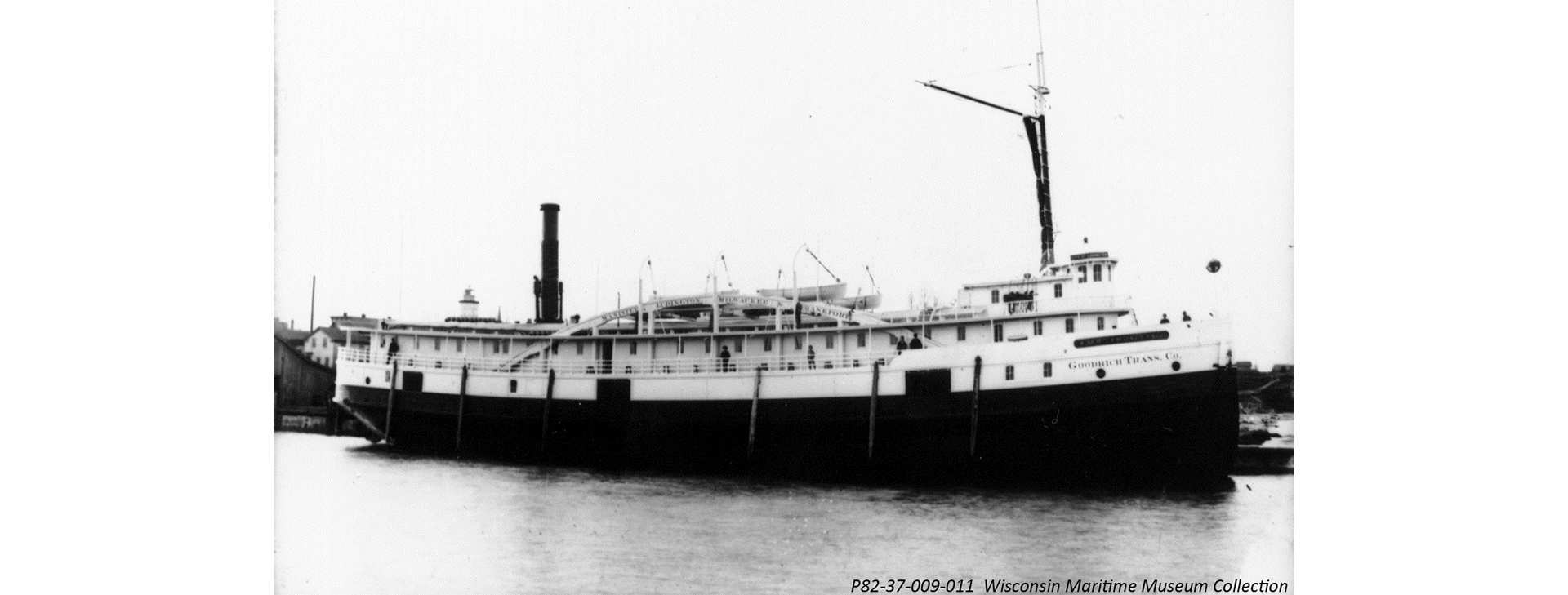
S/S City of Ludington 180' 1880 Wood Burger & Burger Shipyard for Goodrich Transportation Company

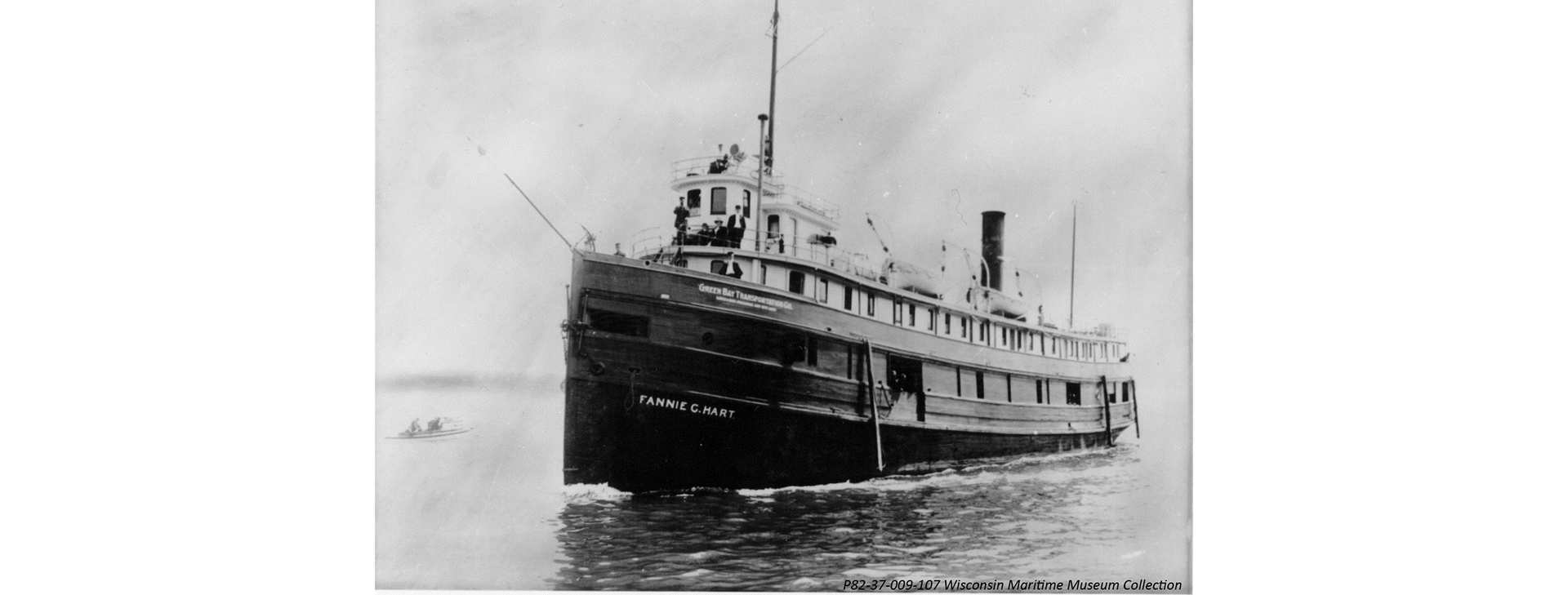
S/S Fannie Hart 143' 1888 Wood Burger & Burger Shipyard

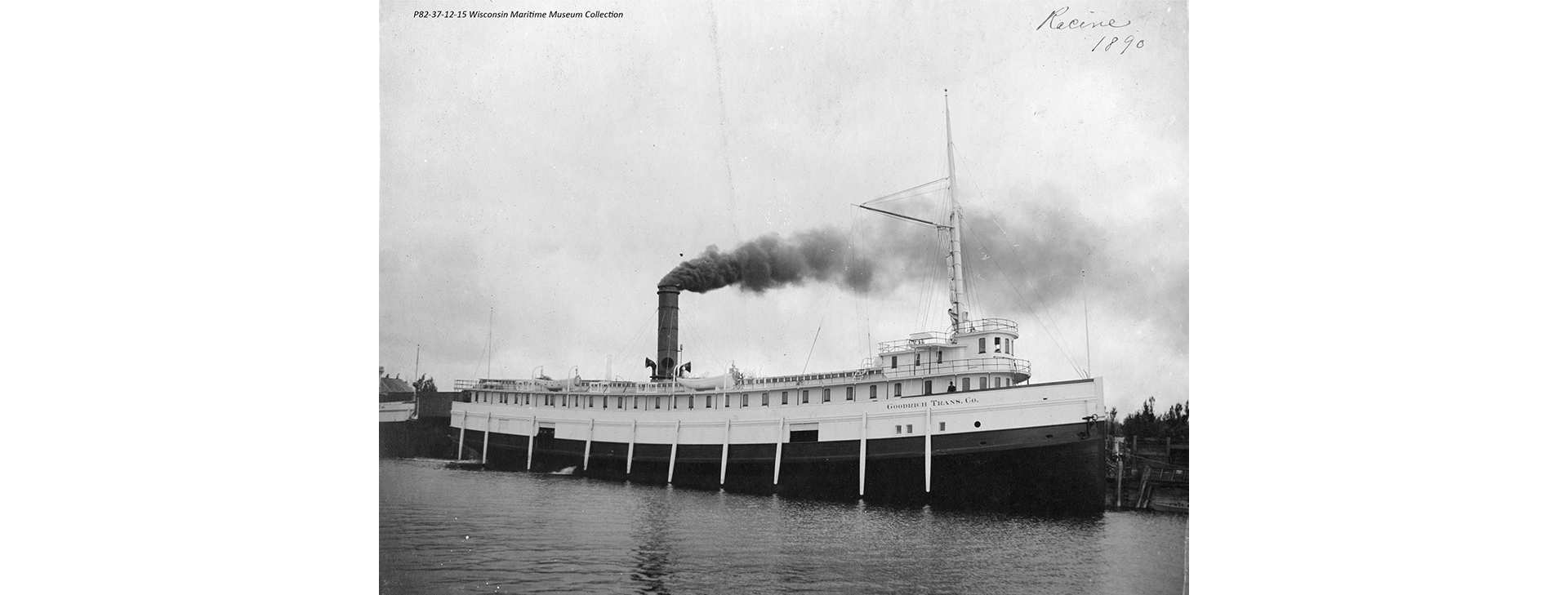
S/S City of Racine 203' 1889 Wood Burger & Burger Shipyard for Goodrich Transportation Company

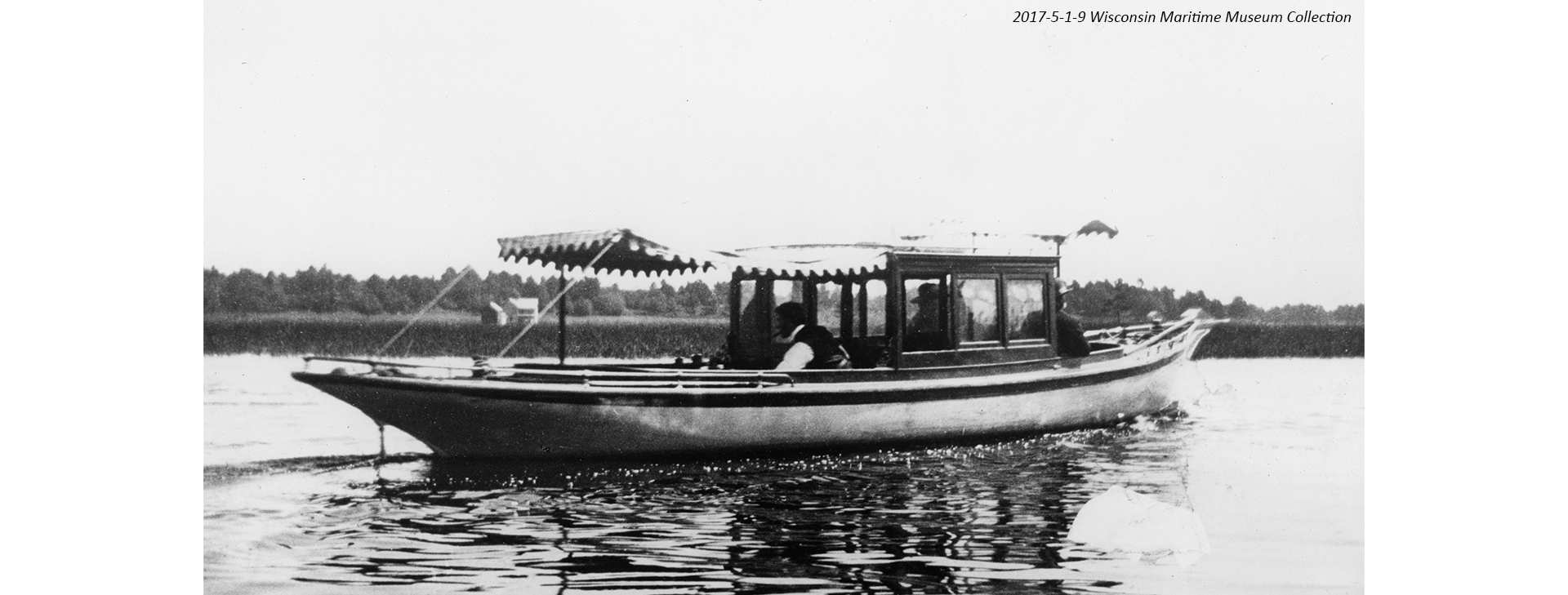
M/V El Tempo 36' 1896 Wood, Henry B Burger Shipyard

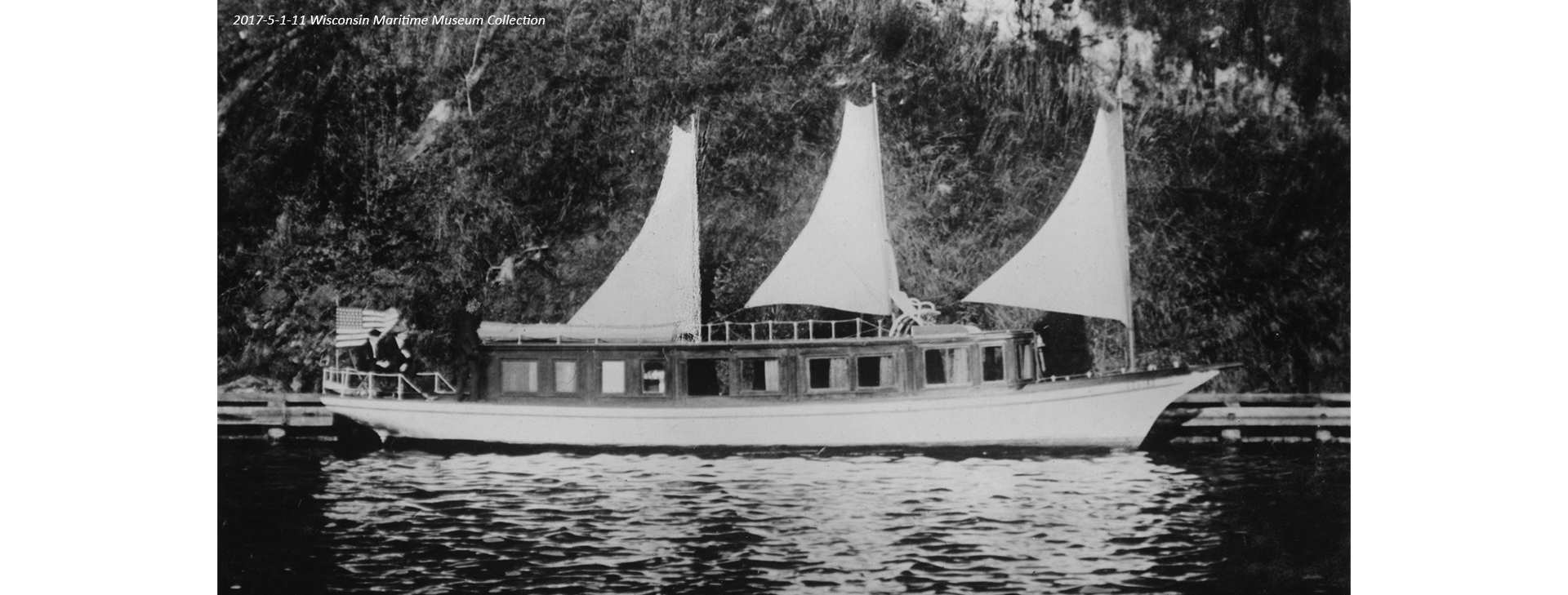
S/V Gesine 1902 50' Wood, Henry B Burger Shipyard

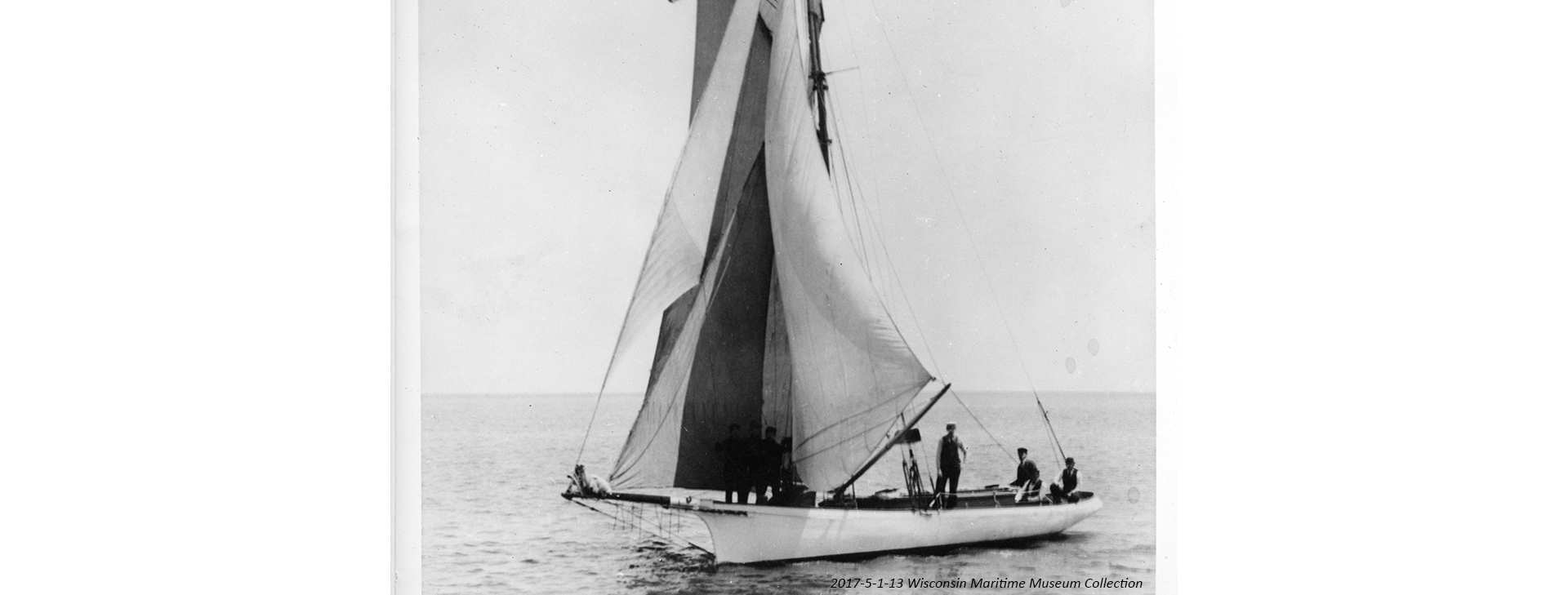
S/V Phantom 25' 1906 Wood, Henry B Burger Shipyard

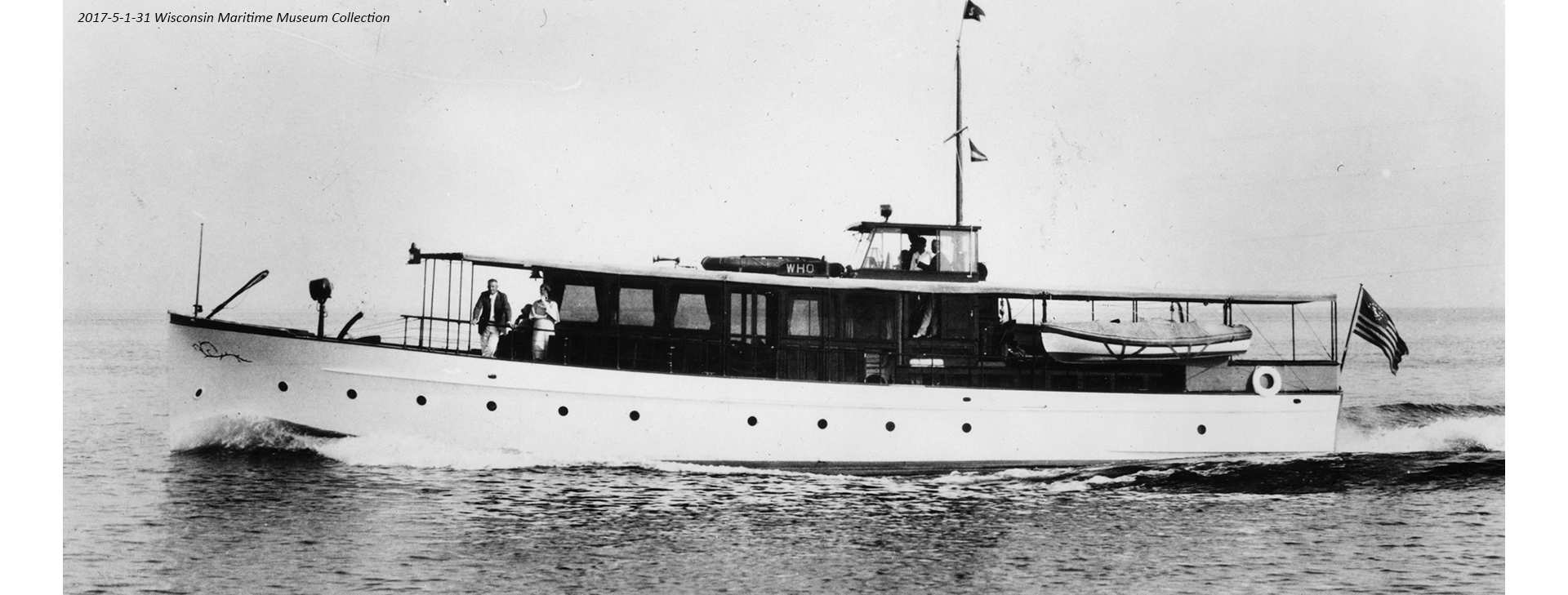
M/V Who 1926 70' Wood, Burger Boat Company

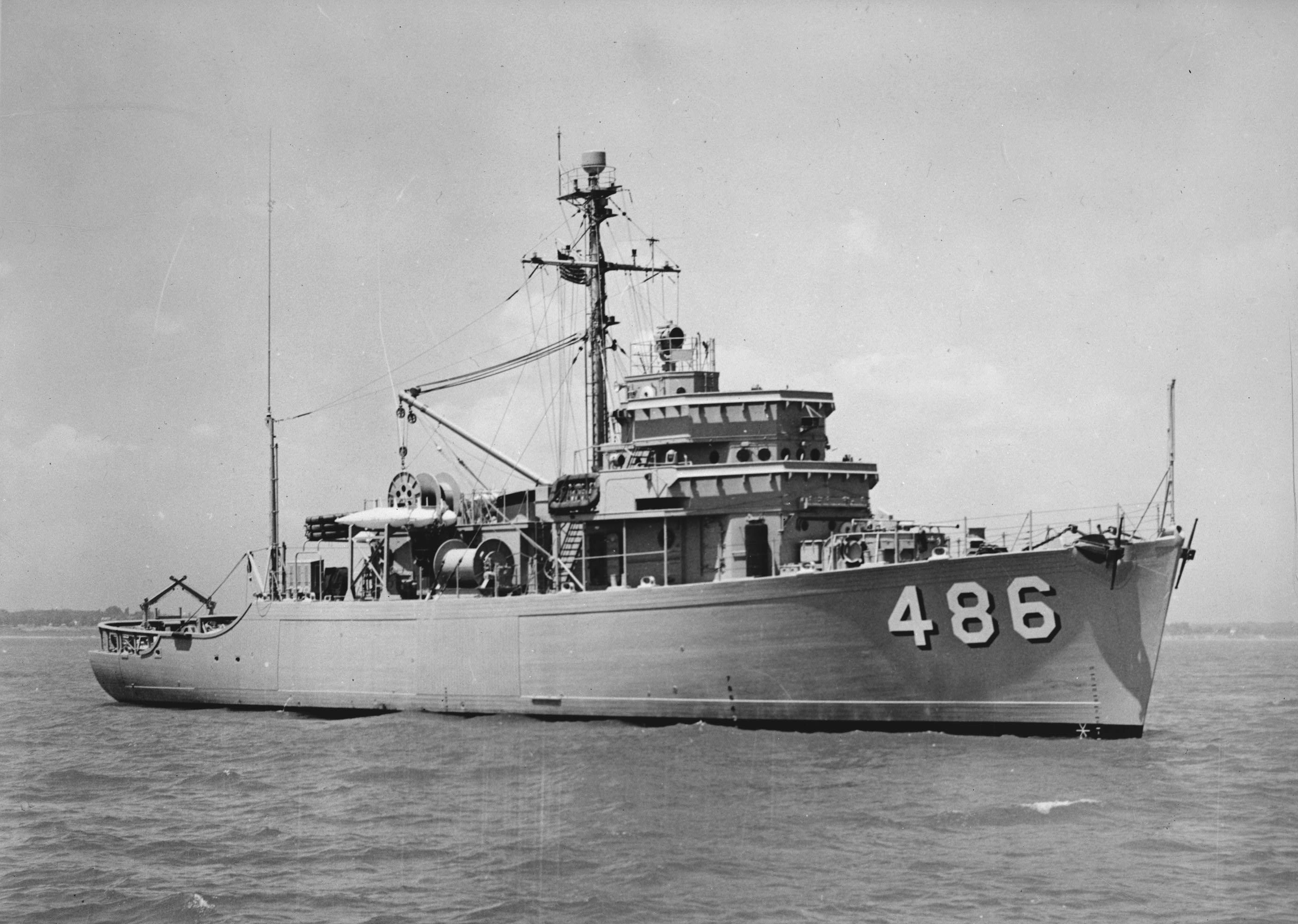
Portuguese minesweeper NRP Graciosa (M417) in 1955 built by Burger Boat Co.

== See also ==
- Goodrich Transportation Company
- Manitowoc Shipbuilding Company
- The Manitowoc Company
