= Pirogue =

Small boat, particularly dugout and canoe

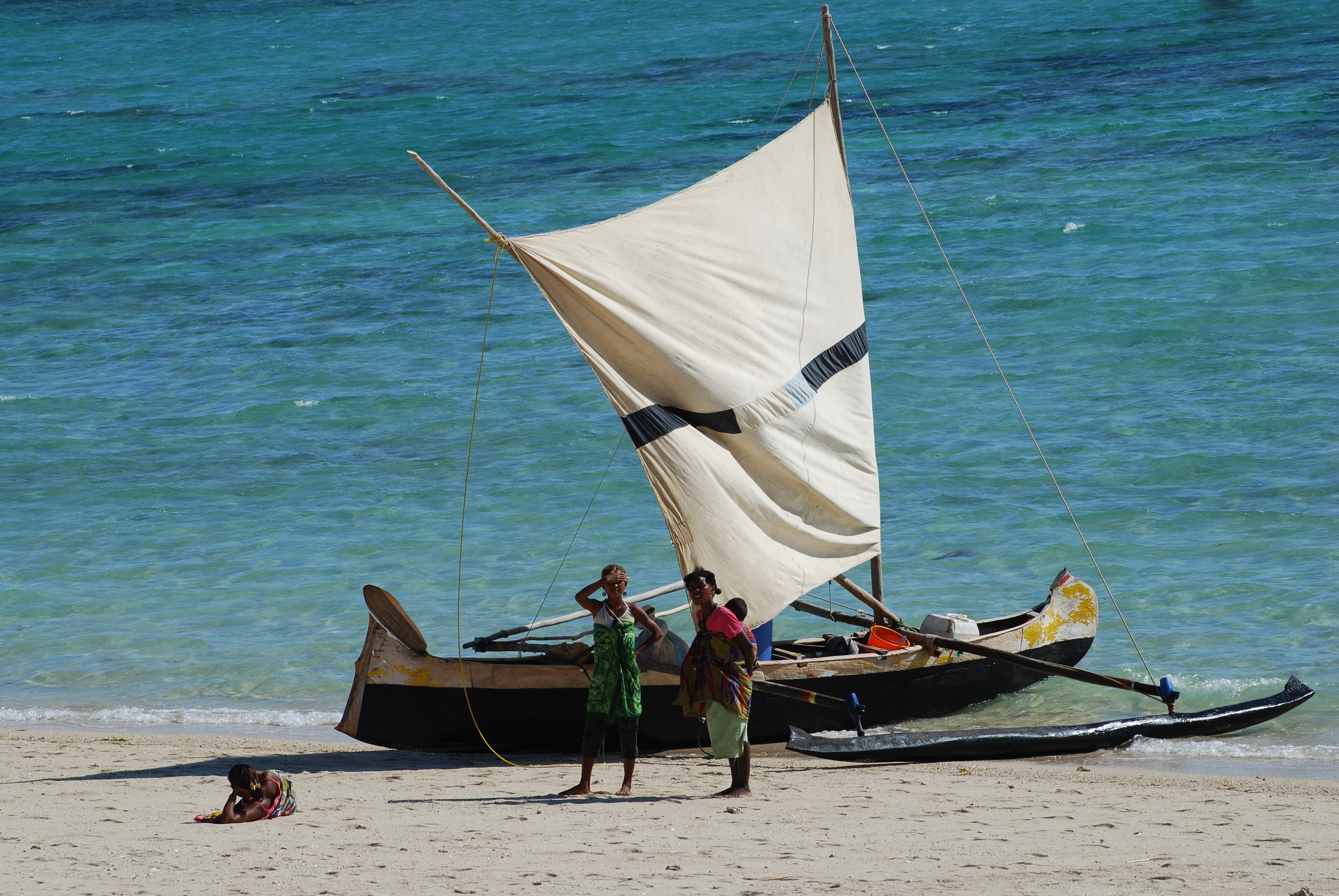
Traditional fishing pirogue (a lakana outrigger canoe) with sail from Madagascar

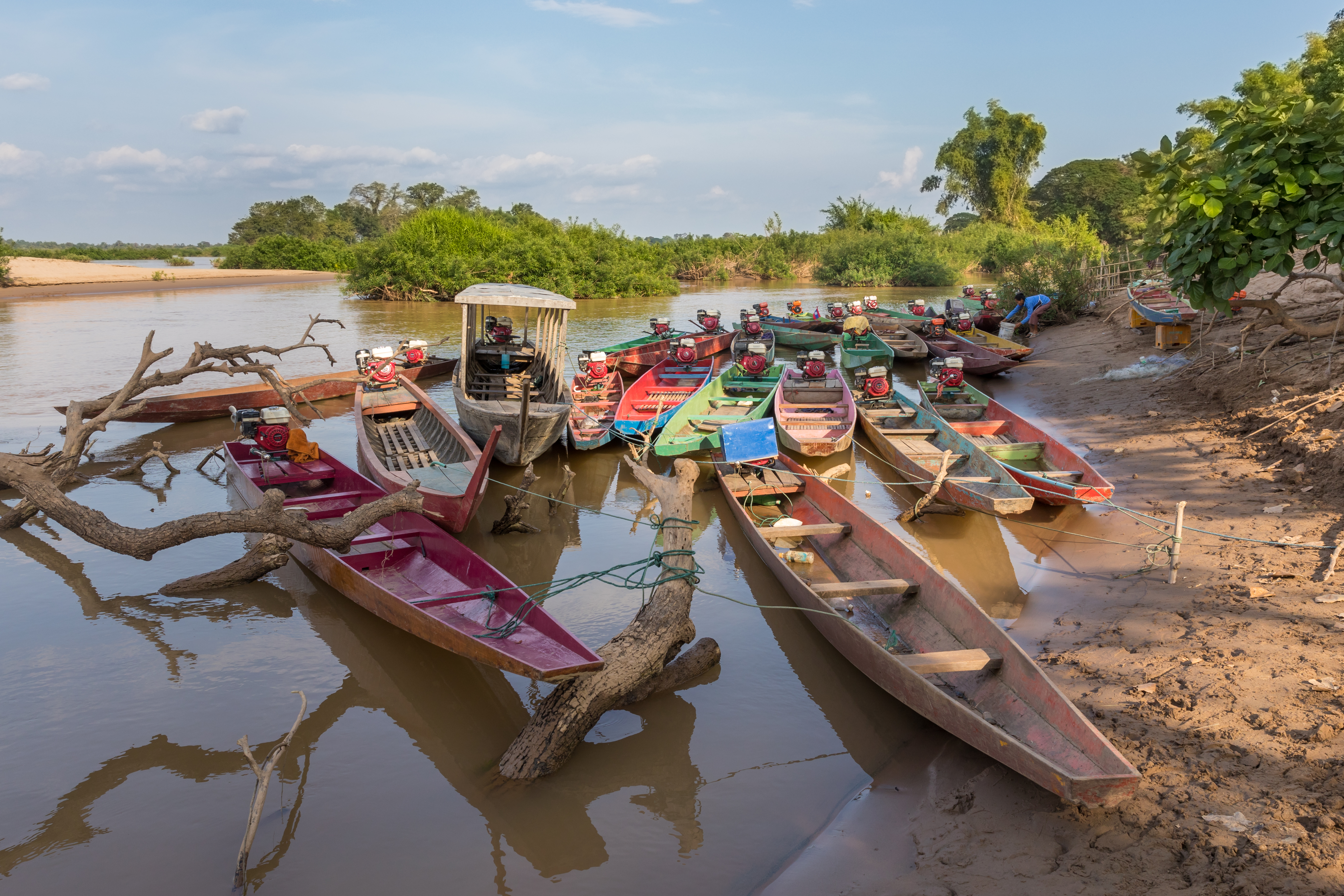
Group of pirogues at sunset on the river bank of Don Tati, Si Phan Don, Laos

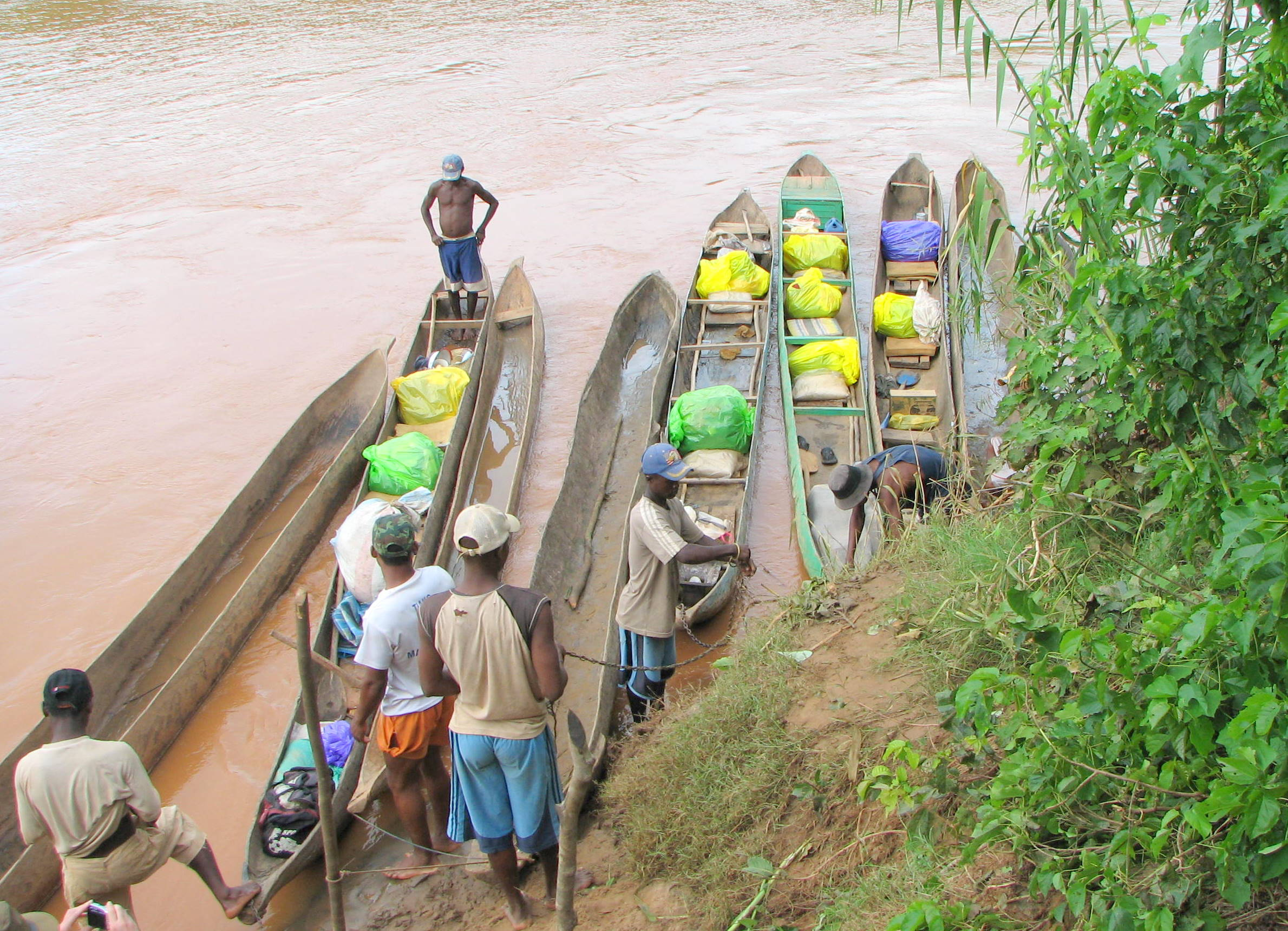
Pirogues of Madagascar

Pirogues, Niger

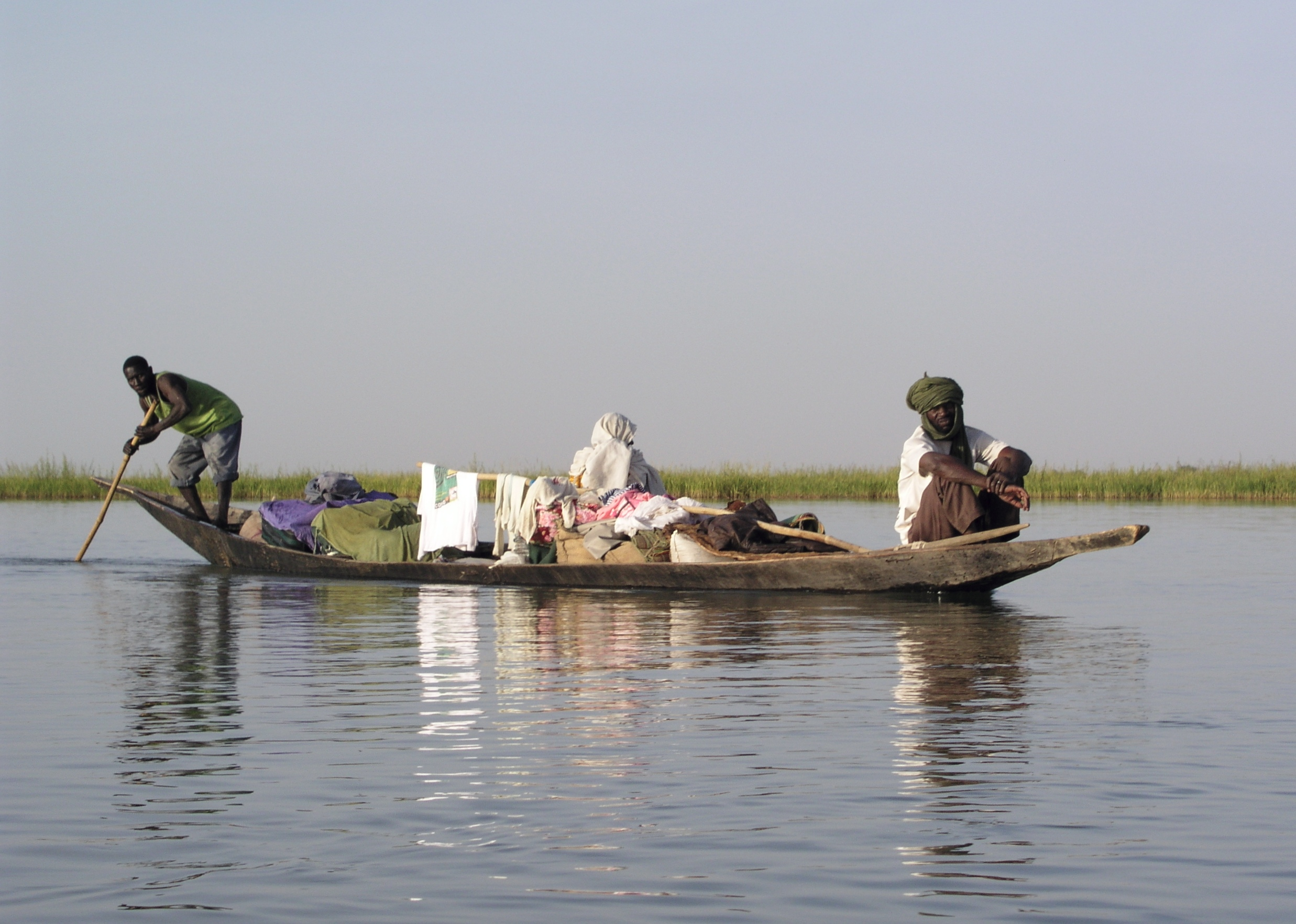
A pirogue on the Niger River in Mali

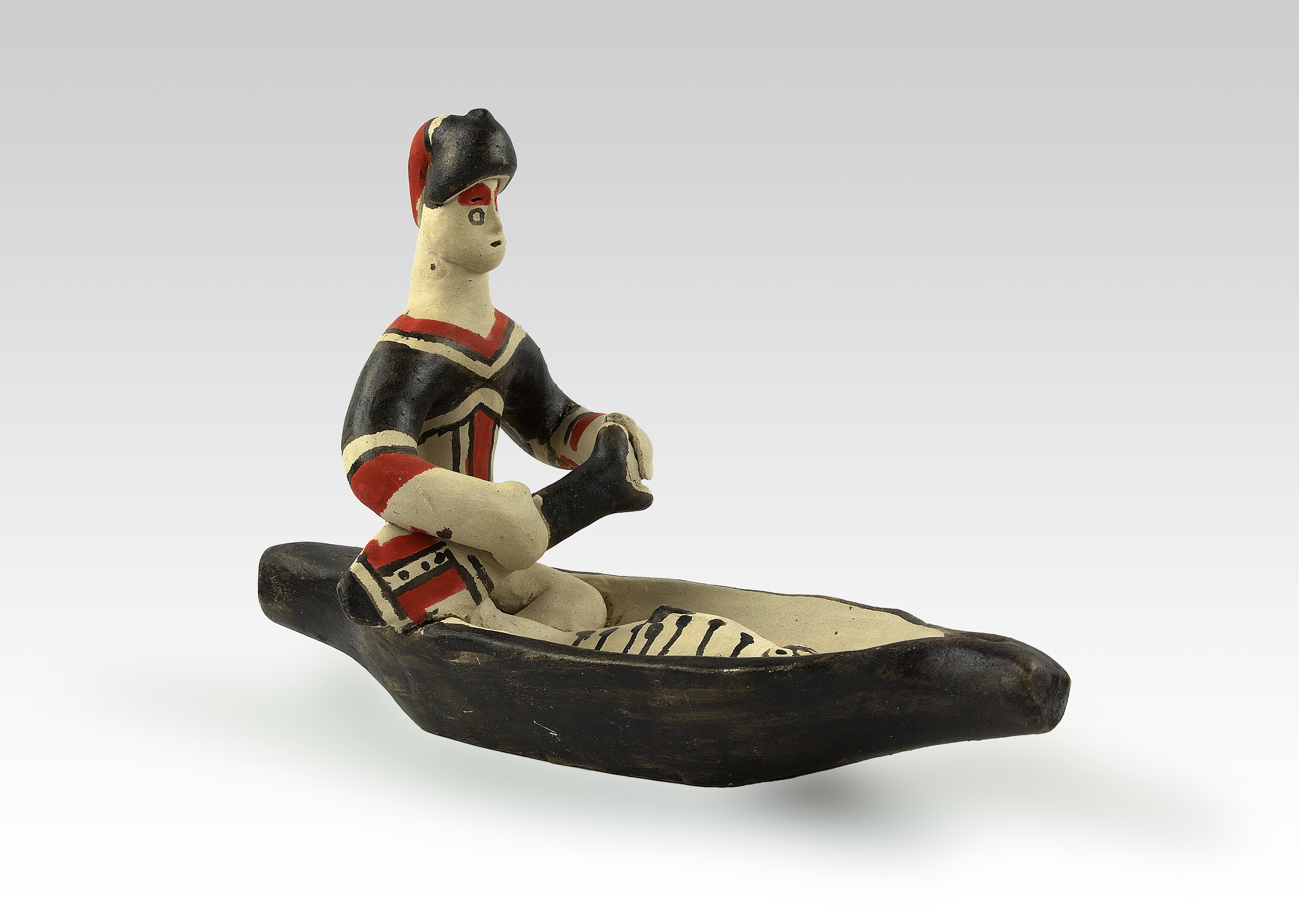
Statuette Karajà - Brazil - MHNT

A pirogue (/pɪˈroʊɡ/ or /ˈpiːroʊɡ/), also called a piragua or piraga, is any of various small boats, particularly dugouts and canoes. The word is French and is derived from the Spanish piragua [piˈɾaɣwa], which comes from the Kalinago piraua.

== Description ==
The term 'pirogue' does not refer to a specific kind of boat, but is a generic term for small boats in regions once colonized by France and Spain, particularly dugouts made from a log. In French West Africa, the term refers to handcrafted banana-shaped boats used by traditional fishermen. In Madagascar, it also includes the more elaborate Austronesian lakana outrigger canoe.

Pirogues are usually propelled by paddles that have one blade (as opposed to a kayak paddle, which has two). It can also be punted with a push pole in shallow water. Small sails can also be employed. There are two types of sails with differences in their shapes, the square one is used mainly for fishing near the coast and is only useful for tailwinds, while the triangular-shaped ones are used to transfer goods from one place to another by maintaining a bowline direction. Outboard motors are increasingly being used in many regions.

== Uses in military and piracy contexts ==
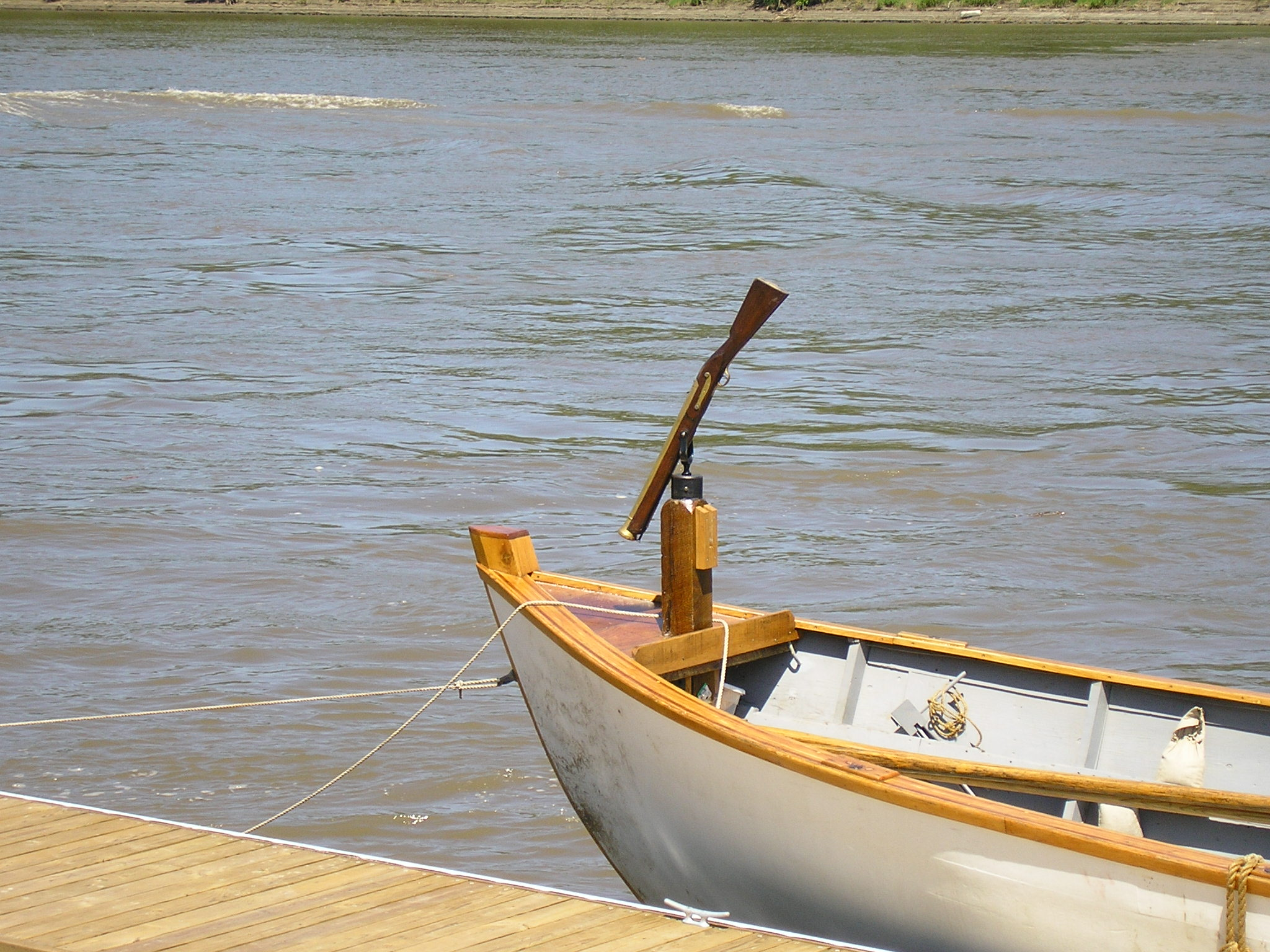
Lewis and Clark's pirogues mounted a blunderbuss to the bow with a pintle.

There are accounts of 17th and 18th century Caribbean pirates using pirogues to attack and take by force much larger vessels including sloops and even barca-longas. Pirogues were used extensively by pirates and buccaneers throughout the Caribbean, the now-Mexican and Gulf Coasts and the East Coast of what is now the United States. For the most part, though, such vessels were used for scouting or as tenders.

Pirogues were used by Lewis and Clark on the Missouri River and westward from 1804–1806, in addition to batteaux, larger flat-bottomed boats that could only be used in large rivers. Their pirogues were medium-sized boats of the company carrying eight rowers and a pilot, capable of carrying eight tons of cargo. Henry D. Thoreau writes of using heavy pirogues in his book The Maine Woods.

=== Periagua ===
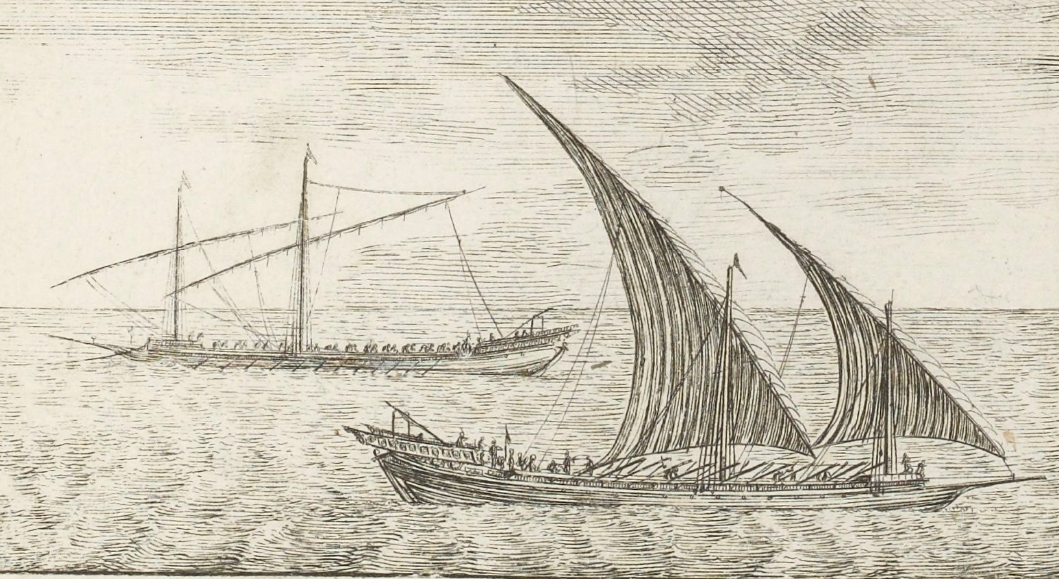
18th-century half galley or periagua

Periagua, periager or periago, from the same Spanish word piragua, was the term formerly used in the Caribbean and the eastern seaboard of North America for a range of small craft including canoes and small sailing vessels, used in fishing and coastal and inter-island commerce. The term periagua overlaps, but is not synonymous with, pirogue, derived through the French language from piragua.

At the end of the 17th century, periaguas came to mean a type of galley or half galley, used by both privateers and pirates around the Bahamas, Cuba and Hispaniola. Periaguas could be rowed against the wind, useful for approaching potential victims or escaping from pursuers. Benjamin Hornigold and Sam Bellamy began their careers as pirate captains operating from periaguas.

Periaguas were flat-bottomed galleys of variable size, moved by both rows and sails. Alexandre Olivier Exquemelin described Spanish guarda costa periaguas as being crewed by up to 120 men and two masts and 36-46 rows. They were usually 30 feet long, 16-18 feet wide, and 4-5 feet draft, armed with one cannon and four swivel guns. The masts could be dismounted in disfavorable winds or to help them go unnoticed.

== Louisiana ==
Pirogues in the United States are associated particularly with the Cajuns and Creoles of the Louisiana marsh. The early Creole pirogues were cypress dugouts but today they are usually flat-bottomed boats. Pirogues are not usually intended for overnight travel but are light and small enough to be easily taken onto land. The design also allows the pirogue to move through the very shallow water of marshes and be easily turned over to drain any water that may get into the boat. A pirogue has "hard chines" which means that instead of a smooth curve from the gunwales to the keel, there is often a flat bottom which meets the plane of the side.

In his 1952 classic song "Jambalaya", Hank Williams refers to the pirogue in the line "me gotta go pole the pirogue down the bayou". Johnny Horton, an avid Louisiana fisherman who celebrated Cajun customs and culture, also mentions pirogues in his 1956 song "I Got a Hole in My Pirogue". Hank Williams, Jr. (son of the aforementioned Hank Williams) had a hit song in 1969 "Cajun Baby", which refers to the pirogue in the line "ride around in my old pirogue".

Doug Kershaw's 1961 hit "Louisiana Man" includes the line "he jumps in his pirogue headed down the bayou". Many online lyrics sites misunderstand this line, saying "hero" or sometimes "biro" instead.

== See also ==
- Chaika
- Mackinaw boat
- Perahu
