= 2023 in Mauritania =

- Decades: 2000s; 2010s; 2020s
- See also: History of Mauritania; List of years in Mauritania

Events in the year 2023 in Mauritania.

== Incumbents ==
- President: Mohamed Ould Ghazouani
- Prime Minister: Mohamed Ould Bilal

== Events ==
- 5 March - A group of four prisoners escape from the Nouakchott Civil Prison.
- 13 May – First round of the 2023 Mauritanian parliamentary election.
- 27 May – Second round of the 2023 Mauritanian parliamentary election.
