= Government of Mohamed Ould Bilal =

Government of Mohamed Ould Bilal may refer to:

- First government of Mohamed Ould Bilal (2020–2022)
- Second government of Mohamed Ould Bilal (2022–2023)
- Third government of Mohamed Ould Bilal (2023–present)
