= Government of Mokhtar Ould Djay =

Government of Mauritania since 2024

- 19th Government of the Islamic Republic of Mauritania
- 2024-present
- Date formed: 6 August 2024

People and organisations
- President: Mohamed Ould Ghazouani
- Prime Minister: Mokhtar Ould Djay
- No. of ministers: 32 (Note: Does not include the Prime Minister.)
- Member parties: El Insaf; AND; El Islah; UDP (since 2025)
- Status in legislature: Majority coalition government
- Opposition parties: Tewassoul; Sawab–RAG; AJD/MR; Hope Mauritania; State of Justice; Alliance of People's Forces (since 2024)

History
- Election: 2024 Mauritanian presidential election
- Legislature term: 10th National Assembly of Mauritania
- Predecessor: Ould Bilal III

The government of Mokhtar Ould Djay is the 19th Government of the Islamic Republic of Mauritania, in office since 6 August 2024. It is a coalition between El Insaf, the National Democratic Alliance and El Islah, with the Union for Democracy and Progress also joining the cabinet on 18 September 2025 after a partial reshuffle.

== Background ==
The government was formed after Prime Minister Mohamed Ould Bilal resigned with his government on 2 August 2024 in the aftermath of the 2024 Mauritanian presidential election, with Ould Djay being nominated by President Mohamed Ould Ghazouani hours later.

Ould Djay received his duties from Mohamed Ould Bilal on 5 August 2024 after meeting with Ould Ghazouani. Later that day the Presidency of the Republic announced the Ministers in positions related to the Presidency.

The members of the cabinet were officially announced on 6 August 2024.

A partial reshuffle took place on 18 September 2025.

== Ministers ==
Cabinet
Portfolio	Minister	Took office	Left office	Party
Prime Minister	Mokhtar Ould Djay	2 August 2024	Incumbent	El Insaf
Minister Secretary General of the Presidency of the Republic	Moulaye Ould Mohamed Laghdaf	5 August 2024	Incumbent	El Insaf
Minister in charge of the Office of the President of the Republic	Nany Ould Chrougha	5 August 2024	Incumbent	El Insaf
Minister Counsellor at the Presidency of the Republic	Mohamed Ould Ethmane	5 August 2024	18 September 2025	El Insaf
Minister Counsellor at the Presidency of the Republic	Aissata Ba Yahya	5 August 2024	Incumbent	El Insaf
Minister Counsellor at the Presidency of the Republic	Mohamed Mahmoud Ould Boya	18 September 2025	Incumbent	El Insaf
Minister in charge of the General Secretariat of the Government	Moctar Al Housseynou Lam	6 August 2024	Incumbent	El Insaf
Minister of Youth, Sports and Public Service	Mohamed Abdallahi Ould Louly	6 August 2024	Incumbent	El Insaf
Minister of Vocational Training, Handicrafts and Trades	Mohamed Melainine Ould Eyih	6 August 2024	Incumbent	El Insaf
Minister of Justice	Mohamed Mahmoud Ould Boya	6 August 2024	18 September 2025	El Insaf
Minister of Justice	Mohamed Ould Soueidatt	18 September 2025	Incumbent	El Insaf
Minister of Foreign Affairs, African Cooperation and Mauritanians Abroad	Mohamed Salem Ould Merzoug	6 August 2024	Incumbent	El Insaf
Minister of Defense and Pensioners’ Affairs and Sons of Martyrs	Hanena Ould Sidi	6 August 2024	Incumbent	El Insaf
Minister of the Interior, Decentralization and Local Development	Mohamed Ahmed Ould Mohamed Lemine	6 August 2024	Incumbent	El Insaf
Minister of Islamic Affairs and Original Education	Sidi Yahya Ould Lemrabott	6 August 2024	18 September 2025	El Insaf
Minister of Islamic Affairs and Original Education	El Vadil Ould Sidaty Ould Ahmed Louly	18 September 2025	Incumbent	El Insaf
Minister of Economy and Finance (Note: The Ministry of Economy and Finance was split on 18 September 2025 into the Ministry of Economic Affairs and Development and the Ministry of Finance.)	Sid’Ahmed Ould Bouh	6 August 2024	18 September 2025	El Insaf
Minister of Economic Affairs and Development	Abdellahi Ould Souleymane Ould Cheikh Sidiya	18 September 2025	Incumbent	El Insaf
Minister of Finance	Codioro Moussa N’Guenore	18 September 2025	Incumbent	El Insaf
Minister of Education and Educational Reform	Houda Mint Babah	6 August 2024	Incumbent	El Insaf
Minister of Higher Education and Scientific Research	Yacoub Ould Moine	6 August 2024	Incumbent	AND
Minister of Health	Abdallahi Ould Wedih	6 August 2024	18 September 2025	El Insaf
Minister of Health	Mohamed Mahmoud Ould Ely Ould Mahmoud	18 September 2025	Incumbent	El Insaf
Minister of Public Service and Labour	Mohamed Ould Soueidatt	6 August 2024	18 September 2025	El Insaf
Minister of Public Service and Labour	Mariem Mint Boidiel Ould Houmeid	18 September 2025	Incumbent	El Insaf
Minister of Digital Transformation and Modernization of the Administration	Ahmed Salem Ould Ebode	6 August 2024	Incumbent	El Insaf
Minister of Energy and Oil	Mohamed Ould Khaled	6 August 2024	Incumbent	El Insaf
Minister of Mines and Industry	Tijani Thiam	6 August 2024	Incumbent	El Insaf
Minister of Fisheries, Maritime and Port Infrastructure	El Vadil Ould Siddaty	6 August 2024	18 September 2025	El Insaf
Minister of Fisheries, Maritime and Port Infrastructure	Mokhtar Ahmed Ould Bousseif	18 September 2025	Incumbent	El Insaf
Minister of Agriculture and Food Sovereignty	Memme Ould Beibatte	6 August 2024	18 September 2025	El Insaf
Minister of Agriculture and Food Sovereignty	Sidi Ahmed Ould Bouh	18 September 2025	Incumbent	El Insaf
Minister of Livestock	Mokhtar Ould Gaguih	6 August 2024	18 September 2025	El Insaf
Minister of Livestock	Sidi Ahmed Ould Mohamed	18 September 2025	Incumbent	El Insaf
Ministry of State Property, Heritage, and Land Reform (Note: Until 18 September 2025, the ministry was known as the Minister of Lands, State Property and Land Reform.)	Mokhtar Ahmed Ould Bousseif	6 August 2024	18 September 2025	El Insaf
Ministry of State Property, Heritage, and Land Reform	Mamadou Niang	18 September 2025	Incumbent	El Insaf
Minister of Trade and Tourism	Zeinebou Mint Ahmednah	6 August 2024	Incumbent	El Insaf
Minister of Housing, Urban Planning, and Land Use Planning (Note: Until 18 September 2025, the ministry was known as the Minister of Land Reform, Housing and Urban Planning.)	Mamadou Niang	6 August 2024	18 September 2025	El Insaf
Minister of Housing, Urban Planning, and Land Use Planning	Naha Mint Mouknass	18 September 2025	Incumbent	UDP
Minister of Equipment and Transport	Ely Ould El Veirick	6 August 2024	Incumbent	El Insaf
Minister of Hydraulics and Sanitation	Amal Mint Maouloud	6 August 2024	Incumbent	El Insaf
Minister of Culture, Arts, Communication and Relations with Parliament	Houssein Ould Medou	6 August 2024	Incumbent	El Insaf
Minister of Social Action, Children and Families	Safiya Mint Ntahah	6 August 2024	Incumbent	El Insaf
Minister of Environment and Sustainable Development	Messouda Mint Baham	6 August 2024	Incumbent	El Islah
Government Spokesperson
Government Spokesperson	Houssein Ould Medou	6 August 2024	Incumbent	El Insaf
Minister Delegate
Minister Delegate in charge of Decentralization and Local Development (Note: The Minister is delegate to the Minister of the Interior, Promotion of Decentralization and Local Development.)	Yacoub Ould Salem Vall	6 August 2024	Incumbent	El Insaf
Minister Delegate in charge of the Budget (Note: The Minister is delegate to the Minister of Economy and Finance.)	Ankimour Kodero Harouna	6 August 2024	Incumbent	El Insaf

== Notes ==
Preceded by Ould Bilal III	Government of Mauritania; 2024–present	Incumbent
