= Law on Protection of National Symbols =

Controversial 2021 Mauritanian law

National Assembly of Mauritania
- Long title: Law on the protection of national symbols and the criminalization of attacks on State authority and the honor of the citizen
- Citation: Law nº2021-021
- Territorial extent: Mauritania
- Enacted: 2 December 2021
- Signed by: President Mohamed Ould Ghazouani
- Effective: 15 December 2021

Legislative history
- Introduced by: Council of Ministers
- Committee responsible: Justice, Defense and Interior
- Passed: 9 November 2021
- Voting summary: 85 voted for; 1 abstained; 71 (Note: Includes all 28 opposition deputies which had attended the session but left before the vote started in protest.) absent
- Status: In force

Law nº2021-021 on the protection of national symbols and the criminalization of attacks on State authority and the honor of the citizen, (Note: Arabic: قانون رقم 2021-021 يتعلق بحماية الرموز الوطنية وتجريم المساس بهيبة الدولة وشرف المواطن French: Loi nº2021-021 portant protection des symboles nationaux et incrimination des atteintes à l’autorité de l’Etat et à l’honneur du citoyen) better known as the Law on Protection of National Symbols (Note: Arabic: قانون حماية الرموز الوطنية French: Loi portant protection des symboles nationaux) or Symbols Law, (Note: Arabic: قانون الرموز French: Loi des symboles) is a controversial Mauritanian law criminalizing "acts committed with a view to undermine the authority of the State, its symbols, national security, civil peace, social cohesion, private life and the honor of the citizen". It was introduced by the Council of Ministers on 14 July 2021 and, after months of heated debate, passed on the National Assembly on 9 November 2021.

The law was heavily criticized by the opposition, human rights groups and journalists due to fears that it would negatively impact the exercise of freedom of expression in Mauritania.

== Background ==
The government declared after introducing the bill that "this bill intervenes to compensate for the inadequacies observed in our penal system and make available to practitioners, including magistrates and investigators, clear legal instruments making it possible to impose respect for legal texts and republican values". The government also said that "this will involve defining the acts which constitute attacks on national symbols, the authority of the State and the honor of the citizen as well as the appropriate sanctions to deal with the phenomenon of aggression against the fundamentals of society and the spread of hatred between its components".

== Provisions ==
The final text of the law has nine articles, with articles 1 to 7 covering the crimes and penalties.

The first article aims to incriminate and repress "acts committed, deliberately, using information techniques, digital communication, social communication platforms with a view to undermine the authority of the State, its symbols, national security, civil peace, social cohesion, private life and the honor of the citizen".

Article 2 defines what is considered an infringement on the prestige of the state and its symbols, specifying those acts as attacks on "the authority of the State and its symbols, the sacred principles of Islam, national unity, territorial integrity and any contempt or desecration of the national flag or anthem". It specifies a two-to-four-year imprisonment penalty and a fine of 200,000 to 500,000 MRU.

Article 3 deals with deliberate invasions of privacy, defining them as "any sound or photographic recording deliberately made without the knowledge of the individuals concerned". It also covers as privacy invasions "any injury or insult to the person of the President of the Republic, or any public official who exceeds his actions and management decisions towards his person and his private life, the disclosure of a personal secret without explicit authorization from the person concerned, or any production, publication or distribution of slander, affronts or insults, or the attribution of unfounded facts to a person". It specifies a one-to-two-year imprisonment penalty and a fine of 80,000 to 200,000 MRU.

Article 4 bans "any distribution of text, voice or photographic messages, through the use of techniques and means of information, digital communication and social communication platforms, containing slander, affronts or insults against a region of the country, a component of the people [ethnic groups, castes and tribes], which spreads hatred between these components or incites them against each other". It specifies a two-to-five-year imprisonment penalty and a fine of 200,000 to 400,000 MRU, without prejudice to heavier penalties provided for by other laws.

Article 5 consider as an attack against national security "any publication or distribution of text, voice or photographic messages through the use of information technology, digital communication and social communication platforms aimed at attacking the morality of the armed forces or the destabilization of their loyalty to the Republic", punishing those acts with one to three years of imprisonment and a fine of 200,000 to 400,000 MRU. The taking, publication or broadcast of photos or videos of elements and units of Armed and Security Forces on duty without express authorization from the concerned Command is also considered an attack on national security, being punished with one to two years of imprisonment and a fine of 100,000 to 150,000 MRU.

Article 6 specifies that penalties will be duplicated in case of reincidence, while Article 7 puts the Public Prosecutor in charge of prosecuting the acts committed against this law based either on its own initiative or a complaint from the injured party.

== Legislative history ==
The government quickly referred the draft law after approving it in July 2021. However, the controversy that arose around the law prompted the National Assembly to postpone the debate and vote of the Symbols Law until November 2021.

The bill passed with 85 votes in favor and one abstention on 9 November 2021 after a heated debate during a 10-hour session (with a two-hour break) of the National Assembly. Opposition deputies (28 out of 157) withdrew before the vote in protest. Opposition deputies attacked the draft law, describing it as returning the country to "exceptional covenants and the sanctification of people", while the presidential majority deputies defended it and stressed the need for it to "protect the honor of people from social media users".

== Support ==
Supporters of the law argued that it is necessary at the current stage, after the chaos of insults and curses directed specifically at President Mohamed Ould Ghazouani and his family, not criticizing his performance but attacking him.

=== Government ===
The Minister of Culture and government spokesperson Moktar Ould Dahi considered that the draft law "takes precautions and measures to combat the dilution of freedoms", adding in a Facebook post that "the tongues of most Mauritanians are wet with disapproval of the growing phenomenon that can be described as diluting freedoms, by facilitating the violation of the personal privacy of citizens and harming civil peace, national unity and the prestige of republican institutions by producing and distributing harmful products through the media and digital media".

=== Political parties ===
Sidi Mohamed Ould Maham, one of the leading figures of the ruling Union for the Republic (UPR), said that there is not a single paragraph of the draft law that "constitutes, in [his] belief, a violation of public freedoms or the right of our citizens to express their opinions and positions. Rather, the enactment of this law constitutes an urgent necessity to control and clean media spaces and enabling everyone to access it without receiving insults, slander, or affronts to their honor, their country, or its symbols". He stressed that those who attacked the law were "defending the right of those who have no morals to distribute insults and affronts and attack people’s privacy without any deterrent, and did not think about the rights of the insulted, the recipients of insults and the victims, whose privacy is published and whose calls are leaked". He added that they also "did not think about our right not to harm the prestige of the State that we agreed to establish, the President that we elected to embody it, the flag that symbolizes it, and the anthem that expresses its status, history, and message".

=== Journalists ===
Journalist and blogger Habiboullah Ould Ahmed believe that "all countries of the world are […] realizing that the chaos of freedom will harm their security and stability, so they intervene with legislation that will restore freedom to the right path". He added that "in all countries of the world there is a sudden attention to the danger of absolute freedom […] Here in Mauritania, the torrent of electronic chaos reached such an extent that we wished the social media networks would be closed in order to preserve public tranquility. We were, by default, a warring people and a state without fear, but in reality, and thank God, we were one people and a country with sovereignty and dignity, and if the virtual charge continued, it would drag its tail over reality". He concluded saying that "if filming a policeman doing his job was freedom, then France, which has a real press and a strict law, would not have rejected it".

Journalist Mohamed Moctar Al Fakih stated that "the current reality of national life has become necessary for the existence of a special text that contributes to curbing the phenomenon of rising complacency with all national constants and values, starting with the religious field, passing through national symbols, the forefront of which is the unifying values approved by the Constitution, most important of which is the identity of the nation, its national languages, its cultural diversity, the honor of its citizens and their equality in rights and duties".

=== Academics ===
University professor Mohamed Moctar Moullil noted the "importance of devoting respect for national constants as one of the elements of state-building as an embodiment of the collective will", stressing that “the need to build a legal system that protects all rights and freedoms in the country is a vital issue that will get us out of chaos and non-statehood and not relying on any constants that everyone must respect.”

== Criticism ==
Critics of the Law on Protection of National Symbols denounced what they consider “sanctification” of the President of the Republic, by adding it to national symbols that also include the sanctities of religion, the national anthem and flag, unity and social peace. They see transforming the President of the Republic into a symbol protected by the laws as part of the creation of dictatorship and a cult of personality. Opponents also focused on what they saw as "protection for the practices of the security forces, as their violations of human rights and their oppression of citizens could no longer be documented".

Some bloggers considered it an unprecedented restriction on the margins of press and public freedoms. They pointed out that former President Mohamed Ould Abdel Aziz didn't draft or pass a similar law despite also receiving insults.

=== Political parties ===
Islamist opposition party National Rally for Reform and Development (Tewassoul) called on the president and the government to withdraw the draft law permanently "in respect of the rights and freedoms stipulated in the Constitution and in the agreements signed by Mauritania". The party also expressed "its astonishment at the insistence on passing the notorious draft law, which is dangerous to public freedoms and freedom of expression, which is in the hands of a political dialogue that all parties agreed should discuss all basic issues, including freedoms”. Tewassoul also considered that “the insistence of the government and the deputies of the majority to keep this draft law on the path for approval - despite the consensus of all those interested in public freedoms in the country […] on its danger, the strangeness of its contents, its sanctification of officials, and its denial of citizens’ natural right to evaluate the performance of public employees - reveals the intentions of those lurking about the gains of the Mauritanian people in the areas of public freedoms, especially freedom of expression". The party also criticized the speed that the government tried to pass the law with and considered that "the draft law was loaded with vague words, non-conclusive meanings, and descriptions open to any interpretation without clarification".

El Id Ould Mohameden (a RFD deputy in the National Assembly) declared that it “may be the worst law in the last 20 years” and that it "contains dangerous restrictions on freedoms, protects perpetrators of torture crimes, and discriminates between citizens".

=== Human rights groups ===
Access Now and Article 19, together with several Mauritanian and Arab human rights groups (including AFCF and FONADH) released a joint declaration heavily criticizing the bill after it passed.

=== Journalists ===
Blogger El Hacen El Bembary criticized the law, saying that "if the people are actually the ones who elected the symbols and are the ones who pay their salaries and amenities, and derive their legitimacy from them; why is the first thing that comes to their mind to hide behind a law or an artificial shield that protects [...] the ruler from his public affairs, the president from his citizens, and the employee from his duties? Weak oversight breeds corruption and arrogance, and employees should not be protected from the people so that they do not transgress their powers".

Journalist Ahmedou Mouhamed El Moustapha pointed out that while other countries are installing body cameras on police chests or helmets to limit their violations against innocent people, documenting them if they occur, the Mauritanian government is "seeking to criminalize photographing them [armed and security forces]] except during ceremonial parades".

Journalist Mohamed Moussa Dahah directly criticized the Minister of Justice Mohamed Mahmoud Ould Cheikh Abdoullah Ould Boya, accusing him of being the mastermind behind the law.

=== Lawyers ===
Lawyer Mohamed El Mamy Moulaye Aali believes that the law established three classes of citizens, placing the President of the Republic on top, protecting public officials by placing them in the second class, and leaving the protection of the honor of ordinary citizens (the third class) to the general rules, as "this text didn't talk about them, except for transferring a quasi-verbatim of one of the articles of the Cybercrime Law regarding infringement of personal life".

== See also ==
- Lèse-majesté
