= Mohamed Ould =

Mohamed Ould may refer to:

- Mohamed Ould Bilal, 16th Prime Minister of Mauritania
- Mohamed Ould Brahim, Mauritanian participant in the 1995 IAAF World Indoor Championships – Men's 200 metres and Athletics at the 1996 Summer Olympics – Men's 200 metres
- Sidi Mohamed Ould Cheikh Abdallahi, President of Mauritania from 2007 to 2008
- Mohamed Ould Ghazouani, President of Mauritania since 2019
- Mohamed Khouna Ould Haidalla, Former head of state of Mauritania from 1980 to 1984
- Mohamed Ould Khalifa (born 1968), Mauritanian long-distance runner
- Mohamed Ould Khayar, Mauritanian participant in the 1987 World Championships in Athletics – Men's 1500 metres and Athletics at the 1988 Summer Olympics – Men's 1500 metres
- Mohamed Ould Maaouya, Mauritanian politician
- Mohamed Ould M’Kaitir (born 1985), Mauritanian blogger
- Mohamed Ould Sidi Mohamed Aly, Mauritanian politician
- Mohamed Ould Tolba (born 1962), Mauritanian politician
