= Second government of Mohamed Ould Bilal =

Government of Mauritania between 2022 and 2023

- 17th Government of the Islamic Republic of Mauritania
- 2022-2023
- Date formed: 1 April 2022
- Date dissolved: 3 July 2023

People and organisations
- President: Mohamed Ould Ghazouani
- Prime Minister: Mohamed Ould Bilal
- No. of ministers: 31 (Note: Does not include the Prime Minister.)
- Member parties: Union for the Republic (until July 2022); El Insaf (from July 2022); Union for Democracy and Progress
- Status in legislature: Majority coalition government
- Opposition parties: Tewassoul; APP (until 2023, extraparliamentary); RFD (until 2023, extraparliamentary); UFP (until 2023, extraparliamentary); Sawab–RAG; AJD/MR; Hope Mauritania (since 2023); State of Justice (since 2023)

History
- Elections: 2018 Mauritanian parliamentary election 2023 Mauritanian parliamentary election
- Legislature terms: 9th National Assembly of Mauritania; 10th National Assembly of Mauritania
- Budget: 2022
- Predecessor: Ould Bilal I
- Successor: Ould Bilal III

The second government of Mohamed Ould Bilal was the 17th government of the Islamic Republic of Mauritania, in office between 1 April 2022 and 3 July 2023. It was a coalition between the Union for the Republic, which rebranded itself as El Insaf in July 2022, and the Union for Democracy and Progress, whose leader Naha Mint Mouknass is the only member representing the party.

== Background ==
The government was formed after Prime Minister Mohamed Ould Bilal resigned with his government on 29 March 2022, with him being re-nominated by President Mohamed Ould Ghazouani the following day.

The government change was blamed on severe criticism of the government's performance by Ghazouani, with the president saying on a speech on 24 March 2022 that "Most ministries do not have enough staff to solve the problems of citizens. This is unacceptable. There is a huge lack of oversight of public services".

== Cabinet changes ==
Ould Bilal's second government saw two reshuffles:

- On 6 September 2022, a presidential decree was published announcing changes in several ministries, which was announced minutes after Mauritanian media announced that Moulaye Ould Mohamed Laghdaf, who was previously Prime Minister during ex-president Mohamed Ould Abdel Aziz's first term, was appointed Minister Secretary-General of the Presidency of the Republic, an office which is considered to be parallel to the Prime Minister in Mauritanian politics. Mauritanian digital SaharaMedia reported that the move came after a long meeting between President Mohamed Ould Ghazouani and Ould Mohamed Laghdaf and that it was done in order for El Insaf to have a "quiet man" that could negotiate with the opposition and help the party prepare itself for the upcoming parliamentary and regional election. In a similar move, newly-appointed leader of El Insaf Mohamed Melainine Ould Eyih left the government, while several ministers changed their offices, with only the new Minister of Livestock Brahim Vall Ould Mohamed Lemine being a brand-new appointment. The cabinet also saw the return of Nani Ould Chrougha, who left the government in 2020 after his involvement in a corruption case during the presidency of Ould Abdel Aziz. He was subsequently appointed Minister of Equipment and Transports and government Spokesperson.
- On 26 September 2022, the ministries of National Education and Reform of Education System, Public Service and Labor, and Livestock and the Minister Secretary-General of the Government were replaced.

== Ministers ==
The list of members was announced by the Presidency of the Republic on 1 April, taking position immediately. The following table has been updated to reflect the two reshuffles that happened.

Cabinet members
| Portfolio | Minister | Took office | Left office | Party |
|---|---|---|---|---|
| Prime Minister | Mohamed Ould Bilal | 1 April 2022 | 3 July 2023 | El Insaf |
| Minister Secretary-General of the Presidency of the Republic | Yahya Ould Ahmed El Waghef | 1 April 2022 | 6 September 2022 | El Insaf |
| Minister Secretary-General of the Presidency of the Republic | Moulaye Ould Mohamed Laghdaf | 6 September 2022 | 3 July 2023 | El Insaf |
| Minister Counsellor to the Presidency of the Republic | Coumba Ba | 1 April 2022 | 3 July 2023 | El Insaf |
| Minister Counsellor at the Presidency of the Republic | Naha Mint Mouknass | 1 April 2022 | 3 July 2023 | UDP |
| Minister of Justice | Mohamed Mahmoud Ould Cheikh Abdoullah Ould Boya | 1 April 2022 | 3 July 2023 | El Insaf |
| Minister of Foreign Affairs, Cooperation and Mauritanians Abroad | Mohamed Salem Ould Merzoug | 1 April 2022 | 3 July 2023 | El Insaf |
| Minister of National Defense | Hanena Ould Sidi | 1 April 2022 | 3 July 2023 | El Insaf |
| Minister of the Interior and Decentralisation | Mohamed Ahmed Ould Mohamed Lemine | 1 April 2022 | 3 July 2023 | El Insaf |
| Minister of Islamic Affairs and Original Education | Dah Ould Sidi Ould Amar Taleb | 1 April 2022 | 3 July 2023 | El Insaf |
| Minister of Economic Affairs and Promotion of Productive Sectors | Ousmane Mamoudou Kane | 1 April 2022 | 3 July 2023 | El Insaf |
| Minister of Finance | Isselmou Ould Mohamed M'Bady | 1 April 2022 | 3 July 2023 | El Insaf |
| Minister of National Education and Reform of Education System | Mohamed Melainine Ould Eyih | 1 April 2022 | 6 September 2022 | El Insaf |
| Minister of National Education and Reform of Education System | Adama Bokar Soko | 6 September 2022 | 26 September 2022 | El Insaf |
| Minister of National Education and Reform of Education System | Brahim Vall Ould Mohamed Lemine | 26 September 2022 | 3 July 2023 | El Insaf |
| Minister of Health | Moktar Ould Dahi | 1 April 2022 | 3 July 2023 | El Insaf |
| Minister of Public Service and Labor | Mohamed Ould Abdalahi Ould Ethmane | 1 April 2022 | 26 September 2022 | El Insaf |
| Minister of Public Service and Labor | Zeinebou Mint Ahmednah | 26 September 2022 | 3 July 2023 | El Insaf |
| Minister of Digital Transformation, Innovation, and Modernization of Administration | Cheikh El Kebir Moulaye Taher | 1 April 2022 | 6 September 2022 | El Insaf |
| Minister of Digital Transformation, Innovation, and Modernization of Administration | Moktar Ahmed Yedali | 6 September 2022 | 3 July 2023 | El Insaf |
| Minister of Petroleum, Mines and Energy | Abdessalam Ould Mohamed Saleh | 1 April 2022 | 3 July 2023 | El Insaf |
| Minister of Fishing and Maritime Economy | Mohamed Ould Abedeen Ould Ameyev | 1 April 2022 | 3 July 2023 | El Insaf |
| Minister of Agriculture | Adama Bocar Soko | 1 April 2022 | 6 September 2022 | El Insaf |
| Minister of Agriculture | Yahya Ould Ahmed El Waghef | 6 September 2022 | 3 July 2023 | El Insaf |
| Minister of Livestock | Mohamed Ould Soueidatt | 1 April 2022 | 6 September 2022 | El Insaf |
| Minister of Livestock | Brahim Vall Ould Mohamed Lemine | 6 September 2022 | 26 September 2022 | El Insaf |
| Minister of Livestock | Mohamed Ould Abdalahi Ould Ethmane | 26 September 2022 | 3 July 2023 | El Insaf |
| Minister of Trade, Industry, Handicrafts, and Tourism | Lamrabott Ould Bennahi | 1 April 2022 | 3 July 2023 | El Insaf |
| Minister of Employment and Vocational Training | Lalya Ali Camara | 1 April 2022 | 6 September 2022 | El Insaf |
| Minister of Employment and Vocational Training | Niang Mamoudou | 6 September 2022 | 3 July 2023 | El Insaf |
| Minister of Housing, Urbanism and Land Planning | Sidi Ahmed Ould Mohamed | 1 April 2022 | 3 July 2023 | El Insaf |
| Minister of Equipment and Transports | Moktar Ahmed Yedali | 1 April 2022 | 6 September 2022 | El Insaf |
| Minister of Equipment and Transports | Nany Ould Chrougha | 6 September 2022 | 3 July 2023 | El Insaf |
| Minister of Water and Sanitation | Sidi Mohamed Ould Taleb Omar | 1 April 2022 | 3 July 2023 | El Insaf |
| Minister of Higher Education and Scientific Research | Mohamed Lemine Ould Aboyé Ould Cheikh El Hadrami | 1 April 2022 | 3 July 2023 | El Insaf |
| Minister of Culture, Youth, Sports and Relations with Parliament | Khattar Ould Cheibani | 1 April 2022 | 6 September 2022 | El Insaf |
| Minister of Culture, Youth, Sports and Relations with Parliament | Mohamed Ould Soueidatt | 6 September 2022 | 3 July 2023 | El Insaf |
| Minister of Social Action | Savia Mint N'Tahah | 1 April 2022 | 3 July 2023 | El Insaf |
| Minister of Environment and Sustainable Development | Aissata Daouda Diallo | 1 April 2022 | 6 September 2022 | El Insaf |
| Minister of Environment and Sustainable Development | Lalya Ali Camara | 6 September 2022 | 3 July 2023 | El Insaf |
| Minister Secretary-General of Government | Zeinebou Mint Ahmednah | 1 April 2022 | 26 September 2022 | El Insaf |
| Minister Secretary-General of Government | Moctar Al Housseynou Lam | 26 September 2022 | 3 July 2023 | El Insaf |
Government Spokesperson
| Government Spokesperson | Mohamed Melainine Ould Eyih | 1 April 2022 | 6 September 2022 | El Insaf |
| Government Spokesperson | Nany Ould Chrougha | 6 September 2022 | 3 July 2023 | El Insaf |
Posts of minister's rank
| General Representative for National Solidarity and Anti-Exclusion (Synergy) | Mohamed Ali Ould Sidi Mohamed | 1 April 2022 | 3 July 2023 | El Insaf |
| Commissioner for Human Rights, Humanitarian Action, and Relations with Civil Society | Cheikh Ahmedou Ould Ahmed Salem Ould Sidi | 1 April 2022 | 3 July 2023 | El Insaf |
| Food Security Commissioner | Fatimetou Mint Mahfoudh Ould Khattri | 1 April 2022 | 3 July 2023 | El Insaf |
| Governor of the Central Bank | Mohamed Lemine Ould Dhehby | 31 March 2022 | 3 July 2023 | El Insaf |

== Footnotes ==
| Preceded by Ould Bilal I | Government of Mauritania; 2022–2023 | Succeeded by Ould Bilal III |
