= National anthem of Mauritania (1960–2017) =

النشيد الوطني الموريتاني
English: National Anthem of Mauritania
- Former national anthem of Mauritania
- Lyrics: Baba Ould Cheikh, late 18th century
- Music: Tolia Nikiprowetzky, 1960
- Adopted: 1960; 66 years ago (as national anthem)
- Relinquished: 16 November 2017; 8 years ago (as national anthem)
- Succeeded by: "Bilada-l ubati-l hudati-l kiram"

Audio sample
- U.S. Navy Band instrumental version in B-flat minor: file; help

The "National Anthem of the Islamic Republic of Mauritania" (Arabic: النشيد الوطني الموريتاني, romanized: an-Našīd al-Watani al-Muritāni) was the national anthem of Mauritania between 1960 and 2017.

== History ==
The anthem's lyrics are taken from a poem written in the late 18th century by Baba Ould Cheikh, while the melody was arranged by Russian-French composer Tolia Nikiprowetzky. It was adopted upon independence from France in 1960. Its unusual and highly complex rhythm makes it almost impossible to sing. For this reason, it is often erroneously listed as wordless.

It was replaced by the current national anthem on 28 November 2017 after the Mauritanian constitutional referendum of 2017.

== Lyrics ==
Arabic original

كن للاله ناصرا وأنكر المناكرا
وكن مع الحق الذي يرضاه منك دائرا
ولا تعد نافعا سواه أو ضائرا
واسلك سبيل المصطفى ومت عليه سائرا

فما كفى أولنا أليس يكفي الآخرا
وكن لقوم احدثوا في أمره مهاجرا
قد موهوا بشبه واعتذروا معاذرا
وزعموا مزاعما وسودوا دفاترا

واحتنكوا أهل الفلا واحتنكوا الحواضرا
وأورثت أكابر بدعتها أصاغرا
واحكم بما قد اظهروا فما تدري السرائرا
وإن دعا مجادل في أمرهم إلى مرا
فلا تمار فيهم إلا مراء ظاهرا

Transliteration

Kun lil-ʾilāhi naṣirā, wa-ʾankir il-manākirā
Wa-kun maʿa-l-ḥaqqi-llaḏī yarḍā-hu minka dāʾirā
Wa-lā taʿudda nāfiʿan siwā-ʾahu ʾaw ḍāʾirā
W-asluk sabīla-l-muṣṭafā wa-mut ʿalayhi sāʾirā

Fa-mā kafā ʾawwalanā a-laysa yakfī-l-ʾāḵirā
Wa-kun li-qawmin aḥdaṯū fī ʾamrihi muhājirā
Qad mawwahu bi-šubbahin wa-iʿtaḏarū ma-ʿāḏirā,
Wa-zaʿamū mazaʿima wa-sawwadū dafātirā,

Wa-ḥtanakū ʾahla-l-falā, wa-ḥtanakū-l-ḥawāḍirā
Wa-ʾawraṯat ʾakābirun bidʿataha ʾaṣāḡirā
Wa-ʾin daʿā mujādilun fī ʾamri-him ʾilā mirâ
Fa-lā tumārī fīhimu ʾillā mirāʾan ẓāhirā

IPA transcription (Note: See Help:IPA/Arabic and Hassaniya Arabic § Phonology.)

[kʊn lɪl.ʔi.læː.hi nɑ.sˤɪ.rɑ wɑ.ʔæn.kɪr ɪl.mæ.næː.kɪ.rɑː]
[wɑ.kʊn mɑ.ʕɑl.ħɑq.qɪl.læ.diː jɑr.dˤɑː.hu mɪn.kæ dæ.ʔi.rɑː]
[wɑ.læː tæ.ʕʊd.dæ næː.fɪ.ʕɑn si.wæː.ʔæ.hu ʔɑw dˤɑ.ʔɪ.rɑː]
[wɑs.lʊk sæ.biː.læl.mʊsˤ.tˤɑ.fæː wɑ.mʊt ʕɑ.læj.hi sæ.ʔi.rɑː]

[fæ.mæː kæ.fæː ʔæw.wɑ.læ.næː æ.læj.sæ jæk.fɪː‿l.ʔɑː.χi.rɑː]
[wɑ.kʊl‿lɪ.qɑw.min ɑħ.dæ.θuː fiː ʔæm.rɪ.hi mu.hæ.ʒi.rɑː]
[qɑd mɑw.wɑ.hu bɪ.ʃʊb.bæ.hɪn wɑʕ.tæ.ðɑ.rʊː mɑ.ʕɑː.ði.rɑː]
[wɑ.zɑ.ʕɑ.muː mæ.zæ.ʕɪ.mæ wæ.sæw.wæ.duː dæ.væː.ti.rɑː]

[wɑħ.tæ.næ.kuː ʔæh.læl.fæ.læː wɑħ.tæ.næ.kʊː‿l.ħɑ.wɑː.dˤi.rɑː]
[wɑ.ʔɑw.rɑ.θæt ʔæ.kæː.bɪ.rʊn bɪd.ʕɑ.tæ.hæ ʔɑ.sˤɑ.ʁɪ.rɑː]
[wɑ.ʔɪn dɑ.ʕɑː mu.ʒæː.di.lʊn fiː ʔæm.rɪ.him ʔi.læː mi.rɑː]
[fæ.læː tu.mæː.riː fiː.hi.mu ʔɪl.læː mi.rɑ.ʔæn ðˤɑ.hɪ.rɑː]

English translation

Be a helper for God, and censure what is forbidden
And turn with the law which He wants you to follow
Hold no one to be useful or harmful, except for Him
And walk the path of the chosen one and die while you are on it!

For what was sufficient for the first of us, is sufficient for the last one, too
And leave those people who do evil things with respect to God
They misrepresented Him by making Him similar, and made all kinds of excuses
They made bold claims and blackened notebooks

They let the nomads and the sedentary people both undergo bitter experiences
And the great sins of their innovations bequeathed small
Judge them by their appearances, because you have no power over their inner conscience
And just in case a disputant calls you to dispute about their claims
Do not, then, dispute on them, except by way of an external dispute
