= Government of Ismail Ould Bedde Ould Cheikh Sidiya =

Government of Mauritania between 2019 and 2020

- 15th Government of the Islamic Republic of Mauritania
- 2019-2020
- Date formed: 9 August 2019
- Date dissolved: 6 August 2020

People and organisations
- President: Mohamed Ould Ghazouani
- Prime Minister: Ismail Ould Bedde Ould Cheikh Sidiya
- No. of ministers: 26 (Note: Does not include the Prime Minister.)
- Member parties: UPR; UDP
- Status in legislature: Majority coalition government
- Opposition parties: Tewassoul; APP; RFD; UFP; Sawab–RAG; AJD/MR

History
- Election: 2018 Mauritanian parliamentary election
- Legislature term: 9th National Assembly of Mauritania
- Incoming formation: 2019 Mauritanian presidential election
- Predecessor: Ould Béchir
- Successor: Ould Bilal I

The government of Ismail Ould Bedde Ould Cheikh Sidiya was the 15th government of the Islamic Republic of Mauritania, in office between 9 August 2019 and 6 August 2020. It was a coalition between the Union for the Republic and the Union for Democracy and Progress, whose leader Naha Mint Mouknass was the only member representing the party.

== Background ==
The government was formed after former General Mohamed Ould Ghazouani won the 2019 presidential election, thus deciding to appoint a new government as such a move is seen as a major indicator of Ghazouani's governance plans.

Many of the new ministers were considered to be close to the previous president Mohamed Ould Abdel Aziz.

== Ministers ==
The list of members was announced by the Presidency of the Republic on 9 August, taking position immediately.

Cabinet members
Portfolio	Minister	Took office	Left office	Party
Prime Minister	Ismail Ould Bedde Ould Cheikh Sidiya	5 August 2019	6 August 2020	UPR
Minister Secretary-General of the Presidency of the Republic	Coumba Ba	5 August 2019	6 August 2020	UPR
Minister of Justice	Haïmouda Ould Ramdane	9 August 2019	6 August 2020	UPR
Minister of Foreign Affairs, Cooperation and Mauritanians Abroad	Ismail Ould Cheikh Ahmed	9 August 2019	6 August 2020	UPR
Minister of National Defense	Hanena Ould Sidi	9 August 2019	6 August 2020	UPR
Minister of the Interior and Decentralisation	Mohamed Salem Ould Merzoug	9 August 2019	6 August 2020	UPR
Minister of Economy and Industry	Ckeikh El Kebir Ould Moulay Taher	9 August 2019	6 August 2020	UPR
Minister of Finance	Mohamed Lemine Ould Dhehbi	9 August 2019	6 August 2020	UPR
Minister of Islamic Affairs and Original Education	Dah Ould Sidi Ould Amar Taleb	9 August 2019	6 August 2020	UPR
Minister of Fundamental Education and Reform of Education System	Adama Sonko	9 August 2019	6 August 2020	UPR
Minister of Secondary Education and Technical and Vocational Training	Mohamed Melainine Ould Eyih	9 August 2019	6 August 2020	UPR
Minister of Petroleum, Mines and Energy	Mohamed Ould Abdel Vettah	9 August 2019	6 August 2020	UPR
Minister of Public Service, Labor, and Modernization of Administration	Camara Saloum Mohamed	9 August 2019	6 August 2020	UPR
Minister of Health	Nédhirou Ould Hamed	9 August 2019	6 August 2020	UPR
Minister of Fishing and Maritime Economy	Nany Ould Chrougha	9 August 2019	6 August 2020	UPR
Minister of Trade and Tourism	Mahmoud Sid'Ahmed	9 August 2019	6 August 2020	UPR
Minister of Housing, Urbanism and Land Planning	Khadijettou Mint Bouka	9 August 2019	6 August 2020	UPR
Minister of Rural Development	Dy Ould Zein	9 August 2019	6 August 2020	UPR
Minister of Equipment and Transports	Mohamedou Ould M'Haïmid	9 August 2019	6 August 2020	UPR
Minister of Water and Sanitation	Naha Mint Mouknass	9 August 2019	6 August 2020	UDP
Minister of Higher Education, Scientific Research and Information and Communication Technologies	Sidi Ould Salem	9 August 2019	6 August 2020	UPR
Minister of Culture, Handicrafts and Relations with Parliament	Sidi Mohamed Ould Ghaber	9 August 2019	6 August 2020	UPR
Minister of Employment, Youth and Sports	Taleb Ould Sid'Ahmed	9 August 2019	6 August 2020	UPR
Minister of Social Affairs, Childhood and Family	Neina Kane	9 August 2019	6 August 2020	UPR
Minister of Environment and Sustainable Development	Mariem Bekaye	9 August 2019	6 August 2020	UPR
Minister Secretary-General of Government	Niang Djibril	9 August 2019	6 August 2020	UPR
Government Spokesperson
Government Spokesperson	Sidi Mohamed Ould Ghaber	9 August 2019	6 August 2020	UPR
Minister Delegate
Minister Delegate in charge of the Promotion of Investment and Industrial Development (Note: The Minister is delegate to the Minister of Economy and Industry.)	Habib Ould Ham	9 August 2019	6 August 2020	UPR

== Footnotes ==
Preceded by Ould Béchir	Government of Mauritania; 2019–2020	Succeeded by Ould Bilal I
