= Amal mint Maouloud =

Minister of Hydraulics and Sanitation of the Islamic Republic of Mauritania
- Incumbent
- Assumed office 6 August 2024
- President: Mohamed Ould Ghazouani
- Prime Minister: Mokhtar Ould Djay

Chief Executive Officer of Mauritania Airlines
- In office 2019–2021

Personal details
- Born: 17 September 1983 (age 43) Brussels, Belgium
- Party: Equity Party (Mauritania)
- Education: École Nationale Supérieure d'Arts et Métiers at Paris 6 University

Amal mint Maouloud is a Mauritanian engineer and politician of the Equity Party (Mauritania). She has worked as Chief Executive Officer of Mauritania Airlines and in the energy sectors of France and Mauritania. She has served as Minister of Hydraulics and Sanitation in the Government of Mokhtar Ould Djay since 6 August 2024.

== Biography ==
Mint Maouloud was born on 17 September 1983 in Brussels, Belgium. She speaks Arabic, English and French.

Mint Maouloud trained as an engineer, studying Fluid Mechanics and Energy at the École Nationale Supérieure d'Arts et Métiers at Paris 6 University.

After graduating, mint Maouloud worked as a project engineer at the French multinational electric utility company Électricité de France (EDF) from 2008 to 2010. She moved to Mauritania in 2010, where she worked at the National Agency for Renewable Energies (ANADER), and the Mauritanian Electricity Company (SOMELEC).

From 2019 to 2021, mint Maouloud was Chief Executive Officer of Mauritania Airlines. Following this role, she was an International Consultant in the Energy Sector from 2021 to 2024.

Since 6 August 2024, mint Maouloud has served as Minister of Hydraulics and Sanitation in the Government of Mokhtar Ould Djay. She has sought help from China to resolve water issues in the Mauritanian capital city, Nouakchott through the installation of water treatment systems at the Beni Nadji water plant. She has also met with Mohamed Ben Attou, Ambassador of Algeria to Mauritania, has partnered with Morocco on water projects, and held talks with the Secretary-General of the United Nations (UN) Water Convention (UNWater), Sonja Koeppel, in Ljubljana, Slovenia. She has spoken at international events such as a MENA Water Development Finance Forum panel discussion on climate finance and water resources held in Kuwait.
