= Kosovo–Morocco relations =

Kosovar–Moroccan relations
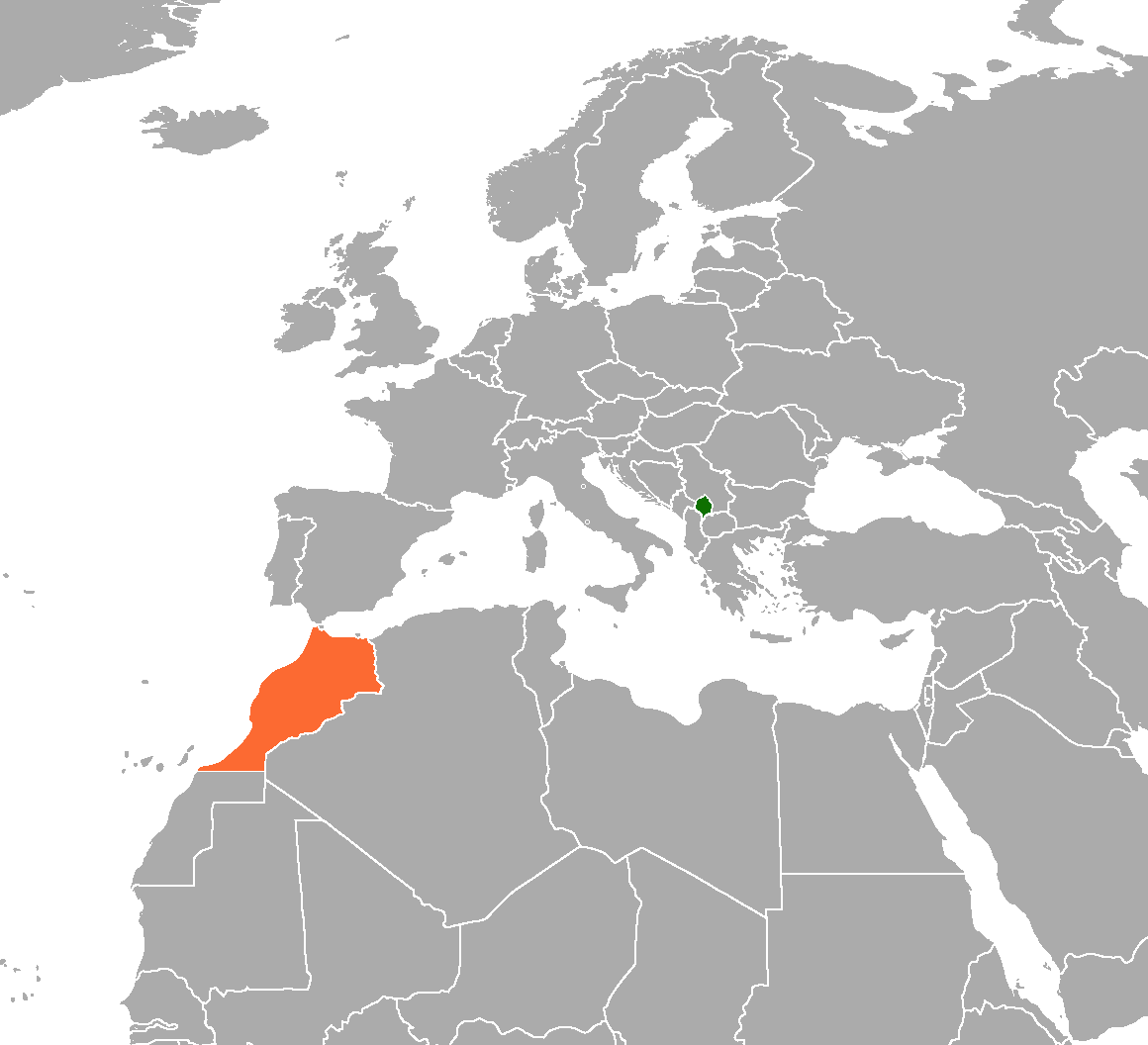
- Kosovo: Morocco

Kosovar–Moroccan relations are foreign relations between Kosovo and Morocco. Formal diplomatic relations between two states are non-existent as Morocco does not recognize Kosovo as a sovereign state.

== History ==
At a meeting in January 2009 with Kosovo's Foreign Minister, Skënder Hyseni, Morocco's Ambassador to Austria, Omar Zniber, said that Morocco was carefully watching developments in Kosovo, saying "People and institutions of my country understand and support the will of Kosovo people. We have been and remain close to Kosovo; I can tell you that my country is having wide consult[ation]s with other countries on the issue of Kosovo recognition. We will make a decision for Kosovo at [the] right time".

During a September 2009 visit to Rabat, Serbian Foreign Minister Vuk Jeremić said that Moroccan leaders had confirmed that Rabat had consolidated its position on not recognising Kosovo. Morocco's Foreign Minister Taieb Fassi Fihri stated that entities could not become states by "unilateral declarations of independence", but only through United Nations processes or mutual consent.

In June 2011, Moroccan government representatives explained that they had difficulty in recognising Kosovo due to the political context of Western Sahara.

On 6 July 2012, Morocco's Foreign Minister, Saadeddine El Othmani, pledged that the highest state institutions would review a request for recognition by Kosovo, and a decision on recognition would be made within an appropriate period. In an 8 October 2012 meeting between the Prime Ministers of Albania and Morocco, Sali Berisha and Abdelilah Benkirane, Benkirane promised to consider a request from the Albanian authorities to recognise Kosovo as it was a very important subject for the region.

== See also ==
- Foreign relations of Kosovo
- Foreign relations of Morocco
