= List of Mauritanian flags =

The following is a list of flags related to Mauritania.

== National flags ==
Flag	Date	Use	Description
	2017–present	Flag of Mauritania	Two red stripes above and below a green field; charged with a golden upward-pointed crescent and star.
	1959–2017	Flag of Mauritania	A green field charged with a golden upward-pointed crescent and star.

== Government flags ==
Flag	Date	Use	Description
	2017–present	Government flag	Two red stripes above and below a green field; charged with a golden upward-pointed crescent and star, a golden border and the Arabic name of the country written in gold in the red stripes.
	2017–present	Presidential flag	White flag with the seal in the centre.

== See also ==
- Flag of Mauritania
- Seal of Mauritania
