= Messouda Mint Baham =

Mauritanian politician (born 1964)

Messouda or Messaouda Mint Baham or Messouda Baham Mohamed Laghdaf or Messaouda Mint Baham Ould Mohamed Laghdaf (born 1964 in Mederdra) is a Mauritanian politician. She was the Minister of Rural Development in 2008–2009. and was elected to parliament again in 2018, for the Al Islah party. In October 2019, she was elected as the first secretary of the National Assembly.

On 6 August 2024 she was appointed Minister of Environment and Sustainable Development in the Government of Mokhtar Ould Djay.
