= Thiam Diombar =

Mauritanian politician

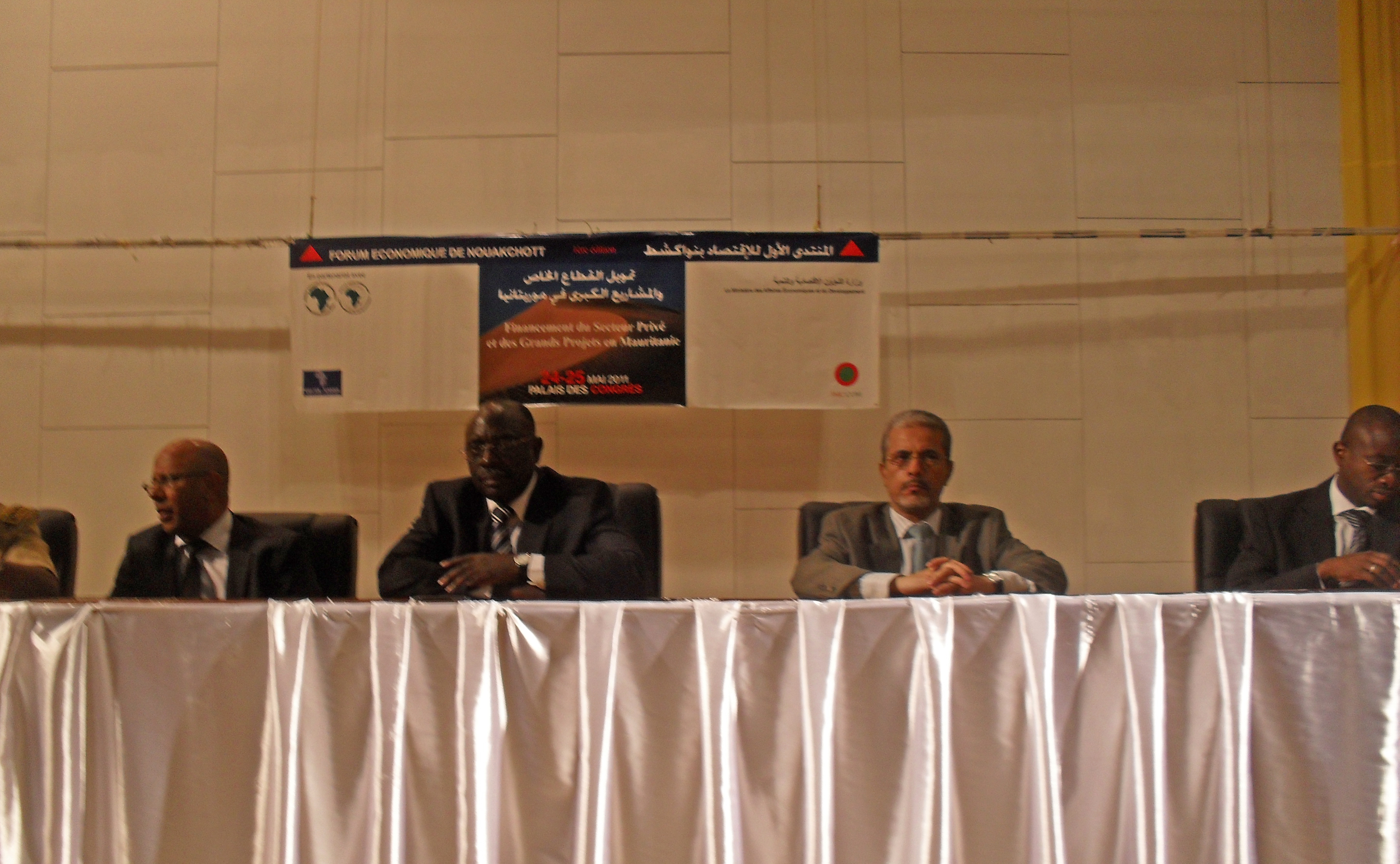
Diombar in center

Thiam Diombar (born 31 December 1959 in Walaldé, Brakna Region) is a Mauritanian politician.

He studied at the École Nationale des Services du Trésor (ENST) in Paris. He was Minister of Finance of Mauritania in the government of President Mohammed Ould Abdelaziz from February 2011 to January 2015. He had previously served as Director of the Treasury.
