= First government of Mohamed Ould Bilal =

Government of Mauritania between 2020 and 2022

- 16th Government of the Islamic Republic of Mauritania
- 2020-2022
- Date formed: 8 August 2020
- Date dissolved: 29 March 2022

People and organisations
- President: Mohamed Ould Ghazouani
- Prime Minister: Mohamed Ould Bilal
- No. of ministers: 24 (Note: Does not include the Prime Minister.)
- Member parties: UPR; UDP
- Status in legislature: Majority coalition government
- Opposition parties: Tewassoul; APP; RFD; UFP; Sawab–RAG; AJD/MR

History
- Election: 2018 Mauritanian parliamentary election
- Legislature term: 9th National Assembly of Mauritania
- Predecessor: Ould Cheikh Sidiya
- Successor: Ould Bilal II

The first government of Mohamed Ould Bilal was the 16th government of the Islamic Republic of Mauritania, in office between 8 August 2020 and 29 March 2022. It was a coalition between the Union for the Republic and the Union for Democracy and Progress, whose leader Naha Mint Mouknass was the only member representing the party.

== Background ==
The government was formed after Prime Minister Ismail Ould Bedde Ould Cheikh Sidiya resigned with his government on 6 August 2020, amid an investigation into alleged corruption during the government of the previous President Mohamed Ould Abdel Aziz, with several current ministers were questioned about suspected graft that occurred on their watch while serving in senior positions during Abdel Aziz's rule. Mohamed Ould Bilal, who previously headed several state agencies, was appointed PM on the same day.

When the government was officially formed on 9 August 2020, the Minister Secretary-General of the Presidency of the Republic confirmed that the reshuffle was done due to the findings done by the parliamentary commission that was investigating corruption during Ould Abdel Aziz's rule, since the names of certain members of the resigning government had been cited in the report of the parliamentary committee. Bokar Soko also said that the government respected the presumption of innocence but that they would let the ministers defend it themselves and wouldn't hesitate to reincorporate them to the government if their innocence was proven.

== Cabinet changes ==
Ould Bilal's first government saw a reshuffle:

- On 26 May 2021, a presidential decree was published announcing changes in several ministries, including five new ministers. The changes included the transformation of several ministries.

== Ministers ==
The list of members was announced by the Minister Secretary-General of the Presidency of the Republic on 9 August, taking position immediately.

Cabinet members
Portfolio	Minister	Took office	Left office	Party
Prime Minister	Mohamed Ould Bilal	9 August 2020	29 March 2022	UPR
Minister Secretary-General of the Presidency of the Republic	Adama Bokar Soko	9 August 2020	29 March 2022	UPR
Minister of Justice	Mohamed Mahmoud Ould Cheikh Abdoullah Ould Boya	9 August 2020	29 March 2022	UPR
Minister of Foreign Affairs, Cooperation and Mauritanians Abroad	Ismail Ould Cheikh Ahmed	9 August 2020	29 March 2022	UPR
Minister of National Defense	Hanena Ould Sidi	9 August 2020	29 March 2022	UPR
Minister of the Interior and Decentralisation	Mohamed Salem Ould Merzoug	9 August 2020	29 March 2022	UPR
Minister of Economic Affairs and Promotion of Productive Sectors	Ousmane Mamoudou Kane	9 August 2020	29 March 2022	UPR
Minister of Finance	Mohamed Lemine Ould Dhehby	9 August 2020	29 March 2022	UPR
Minister of Islamic Affairs and Original Education	Dah Ould Sidi Ould Amar Taleb	9 August 2020	29 March 2022	UPR
Minister of National Education and Reform of Education System (Note: Until 26 May 2021, the ministry was known as the Ministry of National Education, Reform, Technical Formation and Reform.)	Mohamed Melainine Ould Eyih	9 August 2020	29 March 2022	UPR
Minister of Petroleum, Mines and Energy	Abdessalam Ould Mohamed Saleh	9 August 2020	29 March 2022	UPR
Minister of Public Service and Labor (Note: Until 26 May 2021, the ministry was known as the Ministry of Public Service, Labor and Modernisation of the Administration.)	Camara Saloum Mohamed	9 August 2020	29 March 2022	UPR
Minister of Digital Transformation, Innovation, and Modernization of Administration (Note: On 26 May 2021, the ministry was established.)	Abdel Aziz Ould Dahi	26 May 2021	29 March 2022	UPR
Minister of Health	Nédhirou Ould Hamed	9 August 2020	26 May 2021	UPR
Minister of Health	Sidi Ould Zahaf	26 May 2021	29 March 2022	UPR
Minister of Fishing and Maritime Economy	Abdel Aziz Ould Dahi	9 August 2020	26 May 2021	UPR
Minister of Fishing and Maritime Economy	Dy Ould Zein	26 May 2021	29 March 2022	UPR
Minister of Agriculture	Sidina Ould Sidi Mohamed Ould Ahmed Ely	26 May 2021	29 March 2022	UPR
Minister of Livestock	Lemrabott Ould Bennahi	26 May 2021	29 March 2022	UPR
Minister of Trade, Industry, Handicrafts, and Tourism (Note: Until 26 May 2021, the ministry was known as the Ministry of Trade, Industry, and Tourism.)	Naha Mint Mouknass	9 August 2020	29 March 2022	UDP
Minister of Housing, Urbanism and Land Planning	Khadijettou Mint Bouka	9 August 2020	26 May 2021	UPR
Minister of Housing, Urbanism and Land Planning	Sidi Ahmed Ould Mohamed	26 May 2021	29 March 2022	UPR
Minister of Rural Development (Note: On 26 May 2021, the ministry was dissolved to create the Ministries of Agriculture and Livestock.)	Dy Ould Zein	9 August 2020	26 May 2021	UPR
Minister of Equipement and Transports	Mohamedou Ould Mhaimid	9 August 2020	29 March 2022	UPR
Minister of Water and Sanitation	Sidi Ahmed Ould Mohamed	9 August 2020	26 May 2021	UPR
Minister of Water and Sanitation	Mohamed El Hacen Ould Boukhreiss	26 May 2021	29 March 2022	UPR
Minister of Higher Education and Scientific Research (Note: Until 26 May 2021, the ministry was known as the Ministry of Higher Education, Scientific Research and Information and Communication Technologies.)	Sidi Ould Salem	9 August 2020	26 May 2021	UPR
Minister of Higher Education and Scientific Research	Amal Mint Sidi Ould Cheikh Abdallahi	26 May 2021	29 March 2022	UPR
Minister of Culture, Youth, Sports and Relations with Parliament (Note: Until 26 May 2021, the ministry was known as the Ministry of Culture, Handicrafts and Relations with Parliament.)	Lemrabott Ould Bennahi	9 August 2020	26 May 2021	UPR
Minister of Culture, Youth, Sports and Relations with Parliament	Moktar Ould Dahi	26 May 2021	29 March 2022	UPR
Minister of Employment and Vocational Training (Note: Until 26 May 2021, the ministry was known as the Ministry of Employment, Youth and Sports.)	Taleb Ould Sid'Ahmed	9 August 2020	29 March 2022	UPR
Minister of Social Action, Childhood and Family (Note: Until 26 May 2021, the ministry was known as the Ministry of Social Affairs, Childhood and Family.)	Naha Mint Haroune Ould Cheikh Sidiya	9 August 2020	29 March 2022	UPR
Minister of Environment and Sustainable Development	Mariem Bekaye	9 August 2020	29 March 2022	UPR
Minister Secretary-General of Government	Ahmedou Tidjane Thiam	9 August 2020	29 March 2022	UPR
Government Spokesperson
Government Spokesperson	Sidi Ould Salem	9 August 2020	26 May 2021	UPR
Government Spokesperson	Moktar Ould Dahi	26 May 2021	29 March 2022	UPR

== Footnotes ==
Preceded by Ould Cheikh Sidiya	Government of Mauritania; 2020–2022	Succeeded by Ould Bilal II
