= Flag of Mauritania =

Islamic Republic of Mauritania
- Use: National flag and ensign
- Proportion: 2:3
- Adopted: 25 October 2017; 9 years ago
- Design: A green field bordered above and below by a horizontal red band and charged in the centre with an upward-pointing golden star and crescent

The national flag of Mauritania is a green field bordered above and below by a horizontal red band and charged in the centre with an upward-pointing golden star and crescent. It is a derivative of the country's first flag, which omitted the red bands. The current flag was adopted by decree in 2017 following a constitutional referendum in which 86% of voters voted in favour of changing the flag. However, the design was not standardised until 2020, when the government of Mauritania published official graphic guidelines for the national flag.

== Design and construction ==
Although the design of the current flag was first described legally by Decree No. 2017-467 issued on 25 October 2017, it was not standardised until the release of a government-published graphic guidelines for national symbols in May 2020. Article 1 of the guidelines describes the design as "a flag bearing a golden crescent and star on a green background, and a red horizontal rectangular stripe on either side". Article 2 elaborates on the specifics of the design: the flag's width-to-length ratio is 2:3, the star and crescent are centred with the crescent's convexity facing downwards, the star is five-pointed and positioned horizontally at the edges of the crescent, and the width of each red stripe is a fifth of the flag's width. In addition to the guidelines in Article 2, the following parameters are observed when constructing the flag:

- The width of the green field should be three-fifths of the flag's width.
- The distance between the upper red band and the upper tip of the star, as well as the lower red band and the bottom of the crescent, should be a tenth of the flag's width.
- The diameter of the crescent should be half of the flag's length, with the crescent's tips at the farthest left and right points of the circle.

The guidelines do not permit the dimensions and shapes of the flag to be altered. The minimum measurements for a drawn flag are 5.5 by 7.8 millimetres (0.22 by 0.31 in). When constructing the flag, the guidelines recommend beginning with a green field, then adding the red bands, the star, and finally the crescent.

The CMYK, Hexadecimal, and RGB values of the flag's colours are also listed in the guidelines. When printed in black and white, the following greyscale percentages are used: 85% grey for the bands, 50% for the field, and 10% for the star and crescent. When printed against the background of another image, the guidelines recommend that the flag should have a border equal to a twentieth of its width.

Standard colours of the flag of Mauritania
	Green	Red	Gold
CMYK	86/5/95/0	11/100/100/4	1/13/100/0
Hexadecimal	#00A95C	#D01C1F	#FFD700
RGB	0/169/92	208/28/31	255/215/0

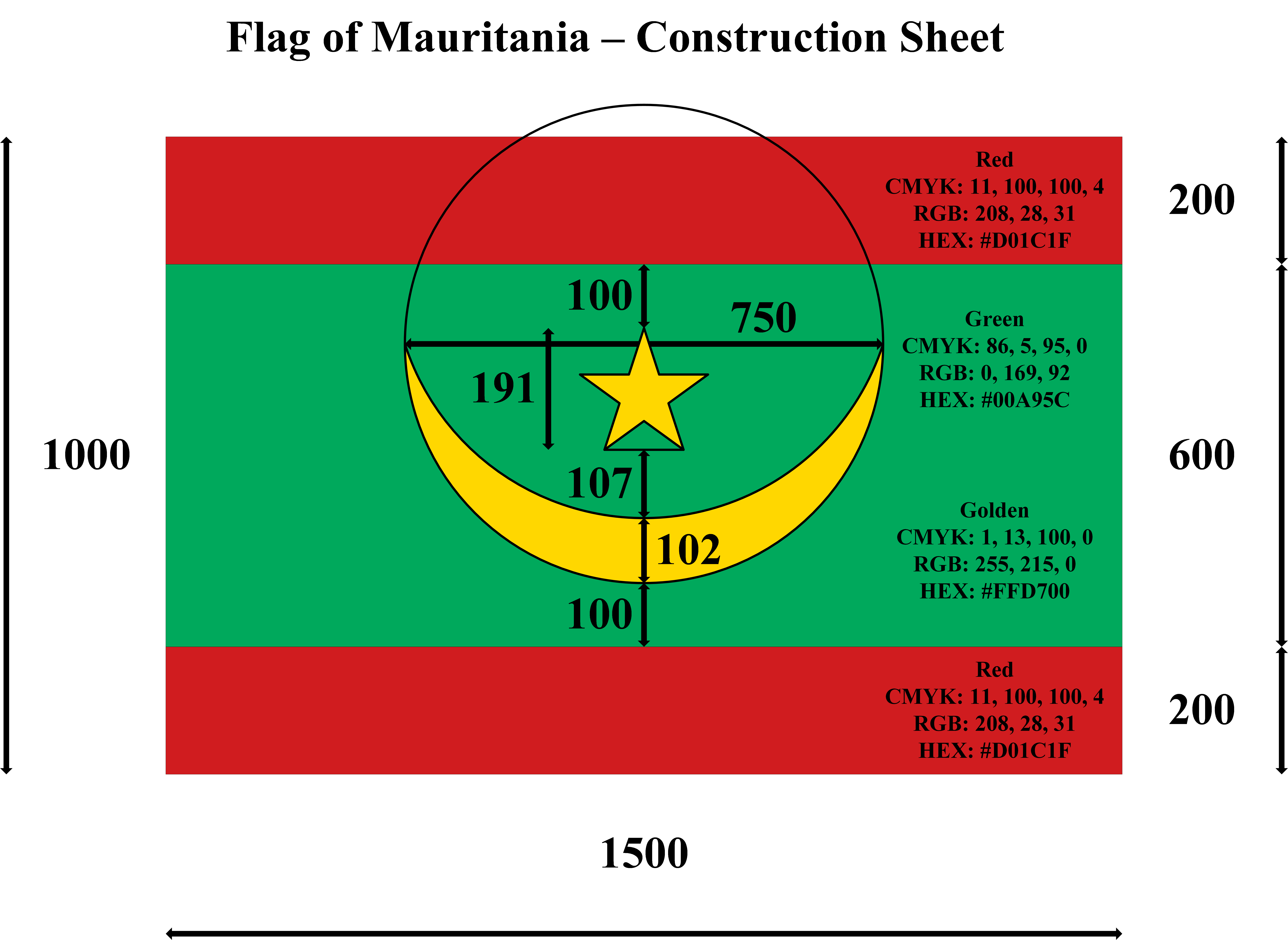
Construction sheet of the flag

=== Symbolism ===
The star and crescent, as well as the colour green, are symbols of Islam. The late vexillologist Whitney Smith describes the star and crescent design of the Mauritanian flag as "of the conservative type common before the 20th century", similar to those of the old flags of Turkey, the Comoros, and Tunisia. The red represents the blood shed by Mauritanians who fought for the country's independence from France. The flag's colours are also the pan-African colours.

== Protocol ==
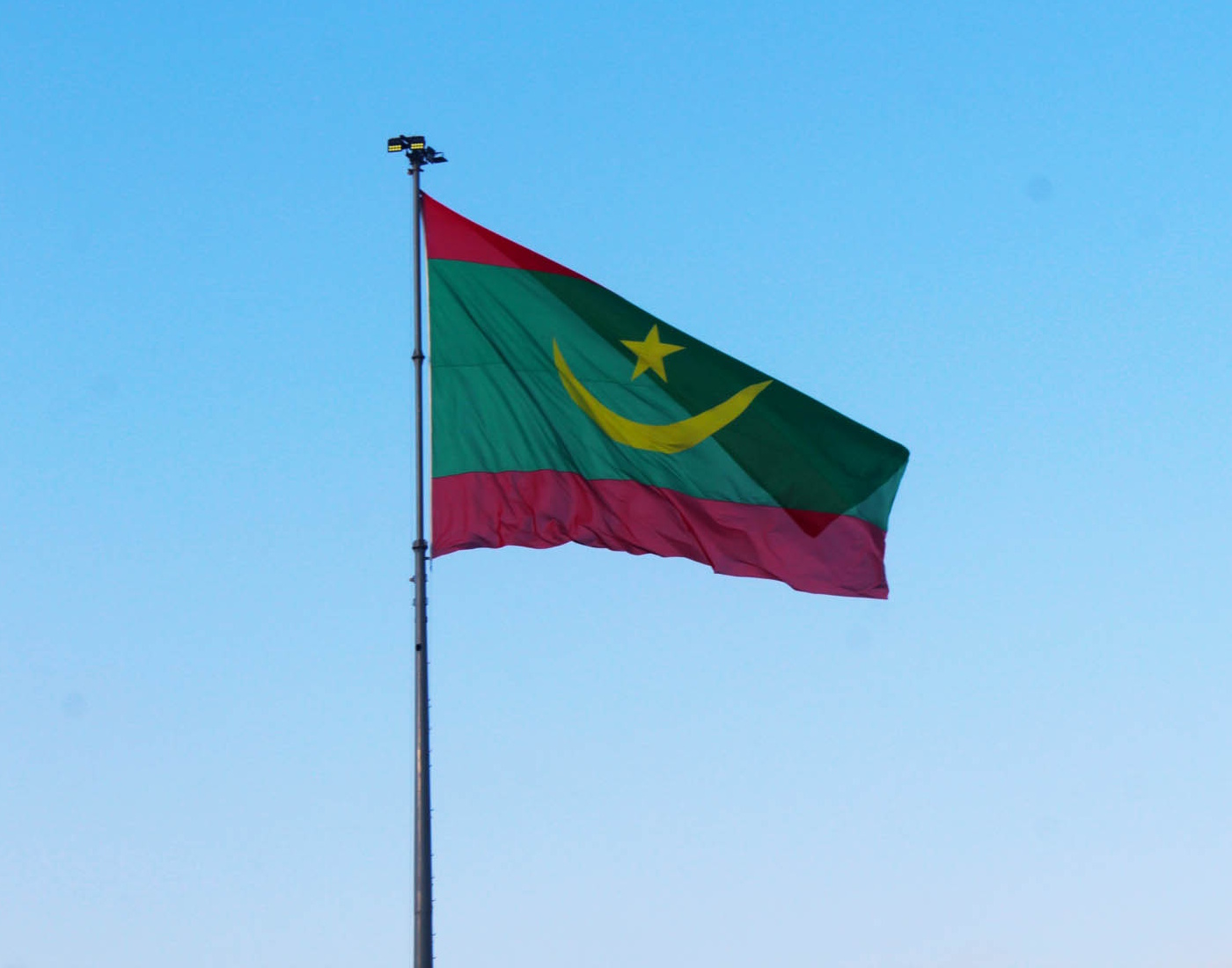
The Mauritanian flag flying in Nouakchott, the country's capital

The graphic guidelines include images depicting how physical flags should be displayed. According to the guidelines, government buildings should display the flag on a flagpole centred in front of or at the top of the building. The guidelines further state that when looking at the front of a building or desk, the fly side of the flag should be to the right of the viewer; on vehicles, the fly side should be facing away from the vehicle.

Disrespecting the national flag is a criminal offence under Article 2 of the Law on Protection of National Symbols (2021). Doing so is punishable by two to four years in prison and a fine of 200,000 to 500,000 Mauritanian ouguiyas.

== History ==
The first flag of Mauritania (1 April 1959 – 25 October 2017)

The initial design of the current flag before standardisation

The flag of France flew in Mauritania from the start of the colonial period in the early 20th century until 1 April 1959, when the first national flag of Mauritania was adopted. Mauritania had been an autonomous republic within the French Union (the successor to the French colonial empire) since 28 November 1958. When the country gained its independence two years later on 28 November 1960, the national flag remained unchanged.

The design of the former national flag is identical to the current one but without the red bands. A proposal to change the flag first emerged at the 2016 Inclusive National Dialogue held by the Mauritanian government from 28 September to 20 October. Lawmakers from the ruling majority wanted the flag to include symbols representing the country's fight for independence. A referendum for the proposed changes was originally scheduled for that year but cancelled after public consultation and concerns over the referendum's expenses amid an economic crisis. Mauritania's political opposition, which had boycotted the national dialogue, opposed the proposed changes. A subsequent proposal to amend the constitution to introduce the changes passed in the lower National Assembly but was voted down in the upper Senate on 22 March 2017 (the proposed amendments included the abolition of the Senate). Then-president Mohamed Ould Abdel Aziz described the proposal's failure as a "dysfunction" in Mauritania's democracy and said the changes would be put to a referendum "as quickly as possible".

A constitutional referendum was held on 5 August 2017, in which over 86% of voters voted to change the national flag and anthem. Turnout was reportedly 54%. The National Assembly, which became unicameral after the referendum, subsequently approved the flag change by adopting Bill No. 136/17 on 12 October. The change was put into law by Decree No. 2017-467 on 25 October, and the new flag was raised for the first time on 28 November, the anniversary of Mauritania's independence from France. In May 2020, the Mauritanian government published graphic guidelines standardising the design of the national flag and outlining its construction and usage for official bodies to reference.

== See also ==
- List of Mauritanian flags
- Seal of Mauritania
