= Kouroudjel =

- Commune and village
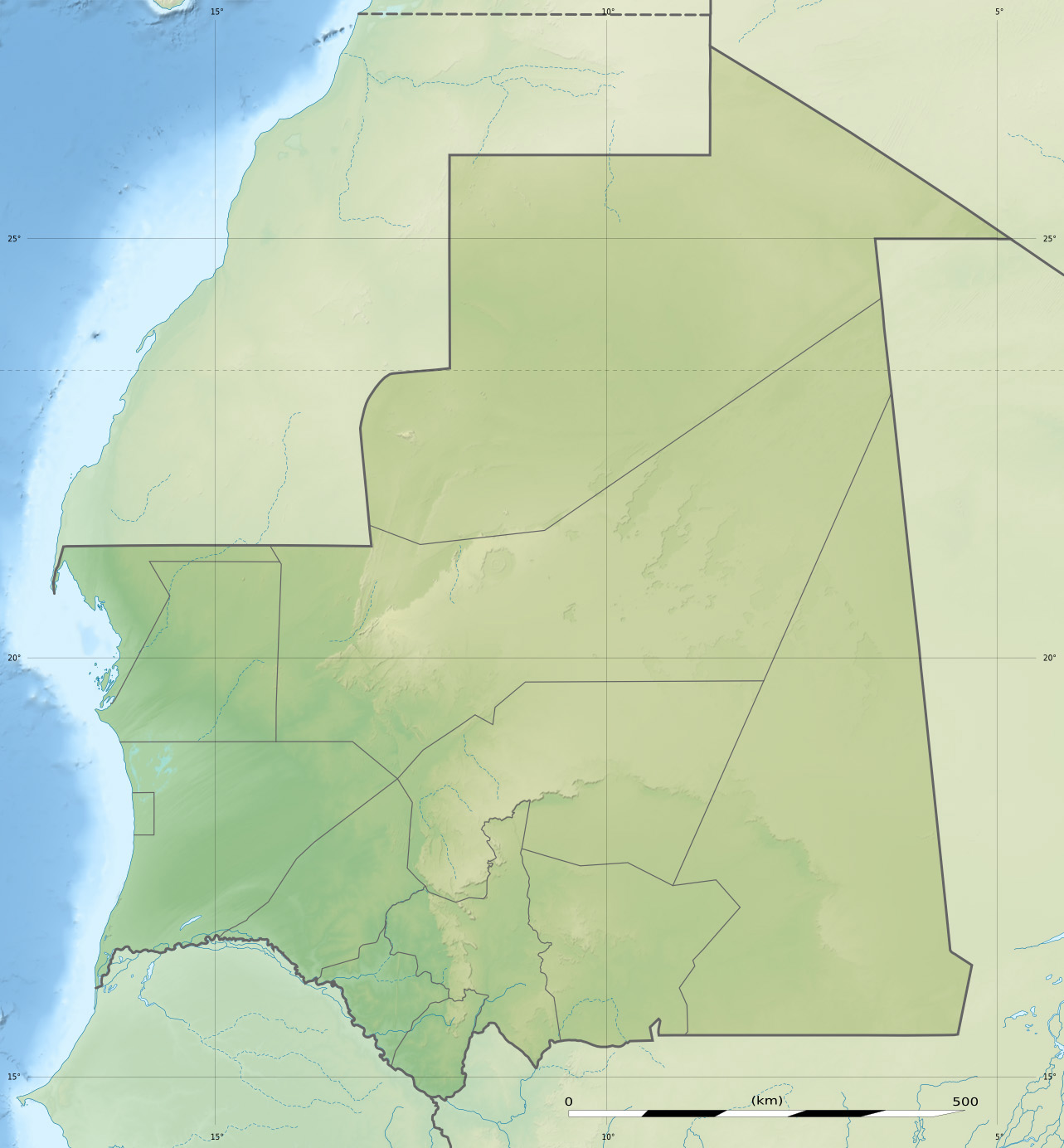
- Location in Mauritania
- Coordinates: 16.20921°N 11.50203°W
- Country: Mauritania
- Region: Assaba Region
- Department: Kiffa
- Time zone: UTC±00:00 (GMT)

Kouroudjel (Arabic: كروجل) is a village and rural commune in Mauritania.

== Location ==
Kouroudjel is a commune in the Kiffa Moughataa of the Assaba Wilaya. The commune of Kouroudjel lies to the south of the commune of Kiffa. The village is on the road leading north from Kankossa to Kiffa, where it joins the RN3 highway.

== Oasis ==
Kouroudjel is in the Sahel, and is an oasis with palm groves. Kouroudjel has depressions with clay-sand beds holding a few clumps of doum palms (Hyphaene thebaica). The date palms (Phoenix dactylifera) mostly grow in sand and silt soils, as opposed to bare sandy soils. They are protected from grazing herds by fences.

== Demographics ==
As of the 2000 census, the population was 3,771, of which 1,674 were male and 2,097 were female.

== Health ==
There is a health center in the village, which was rehabilitated in 2005.

In September 2021 Mohamed Melainine Ould Eyih, Minister of National Education, Technical Training and Reform, visited the Kouroudjel school. There he announced launch of a national school nutrition program. In 2023 Kouroudjel was one of four communes that benefitted from the school feeding program run by the World Food Programme. Using butane gas stoves, two hot meals per day were given to students.

== Sources ==
- Annexe 9 - Analyses complémentaires PACA Mauritanie, UNDP
- Assaba : Lancement du programme national de nutrition scolaire au profit de 41 700 élèves (in French), Kankossa: Ministre de l’Éducation Nationale, 2021-09-02
- Dollé Vincent (1991), Quel avenir pour les oasis de l'Assaba en Mauritanie ? Quelques réflexions à l'occasion d'un projet de Recherche-Développement en zone de Palmeraie (PRDZP - Kouroudjel - ASSABA) (Rapport de mission 2ème Version), Montpellier: CIRAD-DSA
- Godard, V.; Dollé, V.; Vayssières, J.F. (1990), Dollé V.; Toutain G. (eds.), "Un outil de diagnostic rapide pour l'agriculture oasienne : mise au point méthodologique pour l'utilisation de données satellitaires SPOT dans la région de l'ASABA Mauritanien" (PDF), Les systèmes agricoles oasiens, Options Méditerranéennes : Série A. Séminaires Méditerranéens; n. 11 (in French), Montpellier: CIHEAM, pp. 91–102
- "Kouroudel", Bing Maps
- Plan de developpement de la commune de Kiffa (PDF) (in French), Ministere de l’economie et de l’industrie, May 2020
- "Wilaya de l'ASSABA", STATISTIQUES DEMOGRAPHIQUES : Résultats du RGPH 2000 des Wilayas (in French), Commune de Ain Ehel Taya, archived from the original on 2012-04-03
- WFP Mauritania Country Brief, March 2023 (Format Situation Report), WFP, 31 March 2023
