= Seal of Mauritania =

- Armiger: Islamic Republic of Mauritania
- Adopted: 28 November 2017; 7 years ago

The Seal of the Islamic Republic of Mauritania (Note: Arabic: شعار الجمهورية الإسلامية الموريتانية; French: Sceau de la République Islamique de Mauritanie) is the national emblem based on the national flag of Mauritania, which was officially adopted on 15 August 2017.

It contains red, green, and gold emblems. The green symbolizes Islam, the major and official religion in the nation, the gold represents the sands of the Sahara desert, and the red represents the bloodshed of the people that fought for Independence. The star and crescent are also emblems of Islam. The edges read "Islamic Republic of Mauritania" in Arabic and French.

The former seal of Mauritania (1 April 1959 – 28 November 2017).

== See also ==
- Flag of Mauritania
- National anthem of Mauritania
- 2017 Mauritanian constitutional referendum
