= Ministry of Finance (Mauritania) =

Government ministry of Mauritania

The Ministry of Finance ((in French) Ministère des Finances) is the government ministry responsible for governing and managing the economy, national budget, public finances, and the financial activity of Mauritania.

== Ministers responsible for finance ==
- Maurice Compagnet, 1957-1961
- Ba Mamadou Samba, 1961-1963
- Ahmed Ould Muhammad Salah, 1963
- Bocar Alpha Ba, 1963-1965
- Bamba Ould Yezid, 1965-1966
- Muhammad Salem Ould M'Khaitirat, 1966-1968
- Sidi Mohamad Diagana, 1968-1970
- Mokhtar Ould Haibar, 1970-1971
- Diaramouna Soumare, 1971-1975
- Moulaye Mohamed, 1975-1977
- Ibrahima Ba, 1977
- Sidi Ould Cheikh Abdallahi, 1977
- Mohammeden Babbah, 1977
- Ibrahima Ba, 1977-1978
- Ahmed Ould Daddah, 1978
- Sid Ahmed Ould Bneijara, 1978-1979
- Moulaye Mohamed, 1979
- Ahmed Ould Zein, 1979-1981
- Mohamed Yeddih Ould Moctar Hassan, 1981
- Dieng Boubou Farba, 1981-1982
- Sidi Ould Ahmed Deya, 1982-1984
- Anne Amadou Babaly, 1984-1985
- Mohamed Salem Ould Lekhal, 1985-1987
- Cheikh Ould Ahmed Louly, 1987-1988
- Mohamed Ould Nany, 1988-1990
- Mohamedou Ould Michel, 1990
- Sidi Mohamed Ould Boubacar, 1990-1992
- Kane Cheikh Mohamed Fadel, 1992-1994
- Lemrabott Sidi Mahmoud Ould Cheikh Ahmed, 1994-1995
- Sidi Mohamed Ould Biya, 1995-1996
- Kamara Ali Gueladio, 1996-2001
- Mahfoud Ould Mohamed Ali, 2001
- Boidiel Ould Houmeid, 2001-2003
- Mahfoud Ould Mohamed Ali, 2003-2004
- Mohamed Sidiya Ould Mohamed Khaled, 2004-2005
- Abdallahi Ould Souleymane Ould Cheikh Sidiya, 2005-2007
- Abderrahmane Ould Hama Vezzaz, 2007-2008
- Sidi Ould Tah, 2008
- Sid'Ahmed Ould Raiss, 2008-2009
- Ousmane Kane, 2009-2010
- Ahmed Ould Moulaye Ahmed, 2010
- Amedi Camara, 2010-2011
- Thiam Diombar, 2011-2015
- Moctar Ould Diay, 2015-2019
- Mohamed Lemine Ould Dhehby, 2019-2022
- Isselmou Ould Mohamed M’Bady, 2022-2024
- Sid’Ahmed Ould Bouh, 2024-Incumbent.

== See also ==
- Government of Mauritania
- Economy of Mauritania
- Central Bank of Mauritania
