= Tolia Nikiprowetzky =

French composer and musicologist (1916–1997)

Tolia Nikiprowetzky (12 or 25 September 1916 – 5 May 1997) was a French composer and musicologist of Russian birth. His compositions include four operas (Les Noces d'Ombre, La Fête et les masques, Le Sourire de l'Autre and La Veuve du Héros); a symphony (Symphony Logos 5); concertos for saxophone, piano, cello, and trumpet; a piece for wind quintet and string orchestra; two large religious works (Numinis Sacra and Ode Funèbre); a few cantatas; several pieces for solo piano; and numerous chamber works among others. Some of his works experimented with serialism, electronic music, and reflected his interest in African music.

Born in Feodosiya, Nikiprowetzky immigrated with his parents to France in 1923 where they settled in Marseilles. He began his musical studies at the Marseilles Conservatory but left there in 1937 to enter the Conservatoire de Paris where he was a student of Simone Plé-Caussade and Louis Laloy. After World War II he pursued further studies privately with René Leibowitz.

From 1950 to 1955 he worked as musical director of the Moroccan Radio, then in Paris for the overseas radio service. Tolia wrote the first national anthem of independent Mauritania.

He also ran a few nightclubs in Paris, where he died in 1997.
