= Mokhtar Ould Djay =

Prime Minister of Mauritania since 2024

- المختار ولد أجاي
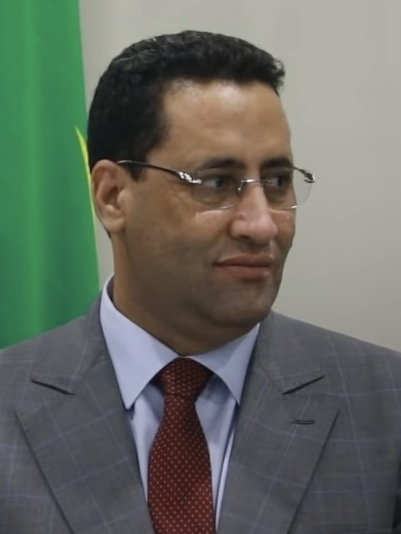
- Ould Djay in 2025

Prime Minister of Mauritania
- Incumbent
- Assumed office 2 August 2024
- President: Mohamed Ould Ghazouani
- Preceded by: Mohamed Ould Bilal

Head of the President's Office
- In office 4 July 2023 – 2 August 2024
- President: Mohamed Ould Ghazouani

Minister of Economy and Finance
- In office 9 February 2016 – 5 August 2019
- President: Mohamed Ould Abdel Aziz
- Prime Minister: Yahya Ould Hademine; Mohamed Salem Ould Béchir
- Preceded by: Himself (Finance); Sid'Ahmed Ould Raiss (Economy)
- Succeeded by: Ckeikh El Kebir Ould Moulay Taher (Economy and Industry); Mohamed Lemine Ould Dhehbi (Finance)

Minister of Finance
- In office 16 January 2015 – 9 February 2016
- President: Mohamed Ould Abdel Aziz
- Prime Minister: Yahya Ould Hademine
- Preceded by: Himself (Finance)
- Succeeded by: Himself (Economy and Finance)

Personal details
- Born: 28 December 1973 (age 52) Moudjéria, Tagant, Mauritania
- Party: El Insaf (since 2022)
- Other political affiliations: Union for the Republic (until 2022)
- Education: National Institute of Statistics and Applied Economics; University of Toulouse
- Cabinet: Ould Djay government (2024–present)

Mokhtar Ould Djay (Arabic: المختار ولد أجاي; born 28 December 1973), also spelled Moctar Ould Diay or Mokhtar Ould Diaye, is a Mauritanian politician serving as the Prime Minister of Mauritania since 2 August 2024.

He previously served as Minister of Finance and Minister of Economy and Finance under the presidency of Mohamed Ould Abdel Aziz, and more recently as Head of the Office of President Mohamed Ould Ghazouani.

== Early life ==
Mokhtar Ould Djay was born on 28 December 1973 in Moudjéria, Tagant. He later moved to Magta Lahjar, in the wilaya of Brakna, to complete primary and secondary studies in the town, obtaining a baccalauréat specialised in mathematics in 1992.

He obtained a bachelor's degree in Engineering from the National Institute of Statistics and Applied Economics of Rabat, Morocco, in 1997.

From 1998 to 2003, he was responsible for labour market data, involved in the national employment policy project funded by the United Nations Development Programme (UNDP). At the same time, between 2000 and 2002, he completed his higher education by obtaining a master's degree in Statistics and Econometrics at the University of Toulouse through distance education.

From 2003 to 2008, he was responsible for the monitoring and evaluation of the Education and Training project and was the Director of the Office of Specialised Studies in the field of Statistics and Economics.

== Political career ==
In 2003, he joined the Ministry of Education as an Advisor for Strategies, Monitoring and Evaluation. After seven years in this position, he was appointed Director General of Taxes in 2010.

=== Minister of Economics and Finance ===
He became Minister of Finance in January 2015 under Yahya Ould Hademine, with his portfolio later extending to also cover the Ministry of Economics following a cabinet reshuffle.

During its mandate, Mauritania experienced an economic shock related to the fall in commodity prices and in particular, the fall in the price of iron ore. Two months before the end of his mandate, he concluded the agreement between the Mauritanian government and the Australian company BCM International, for the exploitation of mines belonging to the National Industrial and Mining Society (SNIM) in the town of F'Déirick.

His name was considered in 2018 as a potential candidate to succeed Mohamed Ould Abdel Aziz due to his close ties to the president, however Mohamed Ould Ghazouani became candidate instead. He was nominated by Ghazouani to become the Director of SNIM in September 2019, holding the office until March 2021.

=== Head of the President's Office ===
He was appointed on 4 July 2023 as Head of the Office of the President of the Republic by Mohamed Ould Ghazouani.

He coordinated El Insaf's successful campaign for the 2023 Mauritanian parliamentary, regional and local elections in the city of Nouakchott, in which the party secured control of all nine communes and the regional council, the first time a national ruling party managed to do so.

=== Prime minister ===
Djay was appointed prime minister by Ghazouani on 2 August 2024 following Mohamed Ould Bilal's resignation and government reshuffle in the aftermath of the 2024 Mauritanian presidential election.

On 9 October 2026, Diay resigned over a report on government failures leading to power outages in August 2026. However, President Mohamed Ould Cheikh El Ghazouani reappointed Diay the same day, asking him to form a new government.

== Personal life ==
Ould Djay is married and a father of seven children. He speaks Arabic and French.
