= National anthem of Mauritania =

النشيد الوطني الموريتاني
English: National Anthem of Mauritania
- National anthem of Mauritania
- Also known as: "Bilāda l-ʾubāti l-hudāti l-kirām" (English: "Land of the Proud, Guided by Noblemen"); French: "Pays des fiers, nobles guides"
- Lyrics: National Committee for the Proposal of the National Anthem
- Music: Rageh Daoud, 2017
- Adopted: 28 November 2017; 8 years ago
- Preceded by: National Anthem of the Islamic Republic of Mauritania

Audio sample
- U.S. Navy Band instrumental version (short version) in E-flat major: file; help

The national anthem of Mauritania (Arabic: النشيد الوطني الموريتاني), also known by its incipit "Land of the Proud, Guided Noblemen" (Arabic: بلاد الأباة الهداة الكرام, romanized: Bilāda l-ʾubāti l-hudāti l-kirām), was officially adopted on 28 November 2017 and was composed by Egyptian composer Rageh Daoud.

== History ==
In March 2017, following a referendum to amend the Constitution of July 1991, the Mauritanian National Assembly adopted a new national anthem to replace the previous one, which was considered almost impossible to sing.

== Lyrics ==
The anthem currently has six verses, with a chorus repeated after each verse. The fifth verse (in brackets) is sung in an extended version of the anthem. It was first sung on the 57th Independence Day of Mauritania, on 28 November 2017.

=== Full lyrics ===
Arabic lyrics

١
بِلَادَ الْأُبَاةِ الْهُدَاةِ الْكِرَامْ
وَحِصْنَ الْكِتَابِ الَّذِي لَا يُضَامْ
أَيَا مُورِيتَانِ رَبِيعَ الْوِئَامْ
وَرُكْنَ السَّمَاحَةِ ثَغْرَ السَّلَامْ

كورال:
سَنَحْمِي حِمَاكِ وَنَحْنُ فِدَاكِ
وَنَكْسُو رُبَاكِ بِلَوْنِ الْأَمَلْ
وَعِنْدَ نِدَاكِ نُلَبِّي أَجَلْ

٢
بُدُورُ سَمَائِكِ لَمْ تُحْجَبِ
وَشَمْسُ جَبِينِكِ لَمْ تَغْرُبِ
نَمَاكِ الْأَمَاجِدُ مِنْ يَعْرُبِ
لِإِفْرِيقِيَّا الْمَنْبَعِ الْأَعْذَبِ

كورال

٣
رَضَعْنَا لِبَانَ النَّدَى وَالْإِبَا
سَجَايَا حَمَلْنَ جَنًى طَيِّبَا
وَمَرْعًى خَصِيبًا، وَإِنْ أَجْدَبَا
سَمَوْنَا، فَكَانَ لَنَا أَرْحَبَا

كورال

٤
سَقَيْنَا عَدُوَّكِ صَابًا وَمُرًّا
فَمَا نَالَ نُزْلًا وَلَا مُسْتَقَرَّا
نُقَاوِمُهُ حَيْثُ جَاسَ وَمَرَّا
نُرَتِّلُ إِنَّ مَعَ العُسْرِ يُسْرَا

كورال

(٥)
قَفَوْنَا الرَّسُولَ بِنَهْجٍ سَمَا
إِلَىٰ سِدْرَةِ الْمَجْدِ فَوْقَ السَّمَا
حَجَزْنَا الثُّرَيَّا لَنَا سُلَّمَا
رَسَمْنَا هُنَالِكَ حَدَّ الْحِمَىٰ

كورال

٦
أَخَذْنَاكِ عَهْدًا حَمَلْنَاكِ وَعْدًا
وَنُهْدِيكِ سَعْدًا لِجِيلٍ أطَلْ

كورال النهائي:
سَنَحْمِي حِمَاكِ وَنَحْنُ فِدَاكِ
وَنَكْسُو رُبَاكِ بِلَوْنِ الْأَمَلْ
سَنَحْمِي حِمَاكِ وَنَحْنُ فِدَاكِ
وَعِنْدَ نِدَاكِ نُلَبِّي أجَلْ

Transliteration

I
Bilāda l-ʾubāti l-hudāti l-kirām
Wa-ḥiṣna l-kitābi l-laḏī lā yuḍām
ʾAyā Mūrītāni rabīʿa l-wiʾām
Wa-rukna s-samāḥati ṯagra s-salām

Kūrāl:
Sanaḥmī ḥimāki wa-naḥnu fidāki
Wa-naksū rubāki bilawuni l-ʾamal
Wa-ʿinda nidāki nulabbī ʾajal

II
Budūru samāʾiki lam tuḥjabi
Wa-šamsu jabīniki lam tahrubi
Namāki l-ʾamājidu min yaʿrubi
Liʾifrīqīyya l-manbaʿi l-ʿaḏabi

Kūrāl

III
Ra-ḍaʿnā libāna n-nadā wā-l-ʾibā
Sajāhjyā ḥamalna janān ṭayibā
Wa-mar ʿan xaṣībān, wa-ʾin ʾajdabā
Samawnā, fakāna lanā ʾar-ḥabā

Kūrāl

IV
Saqaynā ʿaduwwaki ṣābān wa-murrān
Famā nala nuzulān wa-lā mustaqarrā
Nuqāwimnuhu ḥaythu jāsa wa-marrān
Nurattilu ʾin-na maʿa l-ʿusri yusrā

Kūrāl

(V)
Qafhawnā ar-rasūla bi-nahjin samā
ʾIlā sidrati l-majdi fawqa as-samā
Ḥajaznā aṯ-ṯuraiyyā lanā sullamā
Rasamnā hunalika ḥadda l-ḥimā

Kūrāl

VI
Axaḏnāki ʿahdan ḥamalnāki wa-ʿadan
Wa-nuhdīki saʿadān lijilin aṭal

Kūrāl an-nihāʾī:
Sanaḥmī ḥimāki wa-naḥnu fidāki
Wa-naksū rubāki bilawni l-ʾamal
Sanaḥmī ḥimāki wa-naḥnu fidāki
Wa-ʿinda nidāki nulabbī ʾajal

IPA transcription (Note: See Help:IPA/Arabic and Arabic phonology.)

1
[bɪ.læː.dæ‿l.ʔʊ.bæː.tɪ‿l.hʊ.dæː.tɪ‿l.ki.rɑːm]
[wɑ.ħɪsˤ.næ‿l.ki.tæː.bɪ‿l.læ.ðiː læː jʊ.dˤɑːm]
[ʔæ.jæː muː.rɪ.tæː.ni rɑ.biː.ʕɑ‿l.wɪ.ʔæːm]
[wɑ.rʊk.næ‿s.sæ.mæː.ħɑ.ti θɑʁ.rɑ‿s.sæ.læːm]

[kuː.rɑːl]
[sæ.nɑħ.miː ħɪ.mæː.ki wɑ.nɑħ.nʊ fɪ.dæ.ki]
[wɑ.næk.suː ru.bæː.ki bɪ.lɑw.nɪ‿l.ʔæ.mæl]
[wɑ.ʕɪn.dæ ni.dæː.ki nʊ.læb.biː ʔæ.ʒæl]

2
[bʊ.duː.rʊ sæ.mæː.ʔi.ki læm tʊħ.ʒæ.bi]
[wɑ.ʃæm.sʊ ʒæ.biː.ni.ki læm tɑʁ.rʊ.bi]
[næ.mæː.kɪ‿l.ʔæ.mæː.ʒɪ.dʊ mɪn jɑʕ.rʊ.bi]
[lɪ.ʔɪf.rɪ.qɪj.jæː‿l.mæn.bɑ.ʕɪ‿l.ʕɑ.ðæ.bi]

[kuː.rɑːl]

3
[rɑ.dˤɑʕ.næː li.bæ.næ‿n.næ.dæː wæl.ʔi.bæː]
[sæ.ʒæː.jɑː ħɑ.mæl.næ ʒæ.næːn tˤɑ.ji.bæː]
[wɑ.mɑr ʕɑn ħɑ.sˤiː.bæːn wɑ.ʔɪn ʔæʒ.dæ.bæː]
[sæ.mɑw.næː fæ.kæː.næ læ.næː ʔɑr.ħɑ.bæː]

[kuː.rɑːl]

4
[sɑ.qɑj.næː ʕɑ.duw.wæ.ki sˤɑ.bæːn wɑ.mʊr.rɑn]
[fæ.mæː næ.læ nʊ.zʊ.læːn wɑ.læː mʊs.tɑ.qɑr.rɑː]
[nʊ.qɑː.wɪ.mʊ.hʊ ħɑj.θʊ ʒæː.sæ wɑ.mʊr.rɑn]
[nʊ.rɑt.tɪ.lʊ ʔɪn.næ mɑ.ʕɑ‿l.ʕʊs.rɪ jʊs.rɑː]

[kuː.rɑːl]

(5)
[qɑ.fɑw.nɑː‿r.rɑ.sʊː.læ bi.næh.ʒin sæ.mæː]
[ʔi.læː sɪd.rɑ.tɪ‿l.mæʒ.di fɑw.qɑ‿s.sæ.mæː]
[ħɑ.ʒæz.næː‿θ.θʊ.rɑj.jæː læ.næː sʊl.læ.mæː]
[rɑ.sæm.næː hʊ.næ.li.kæ ħɑd.dæ‿l.ħɪ.mæː]

[kuː.rɑːl]

6
[ɑ.ħɑð.næː.ki ʕɑh.dæn ħɑ.mæl.næː.ki wɑ.ʕɑ.dæn]
[wɑ.nʊh.diː.ki sɑ.ʕɑ.dæːn lɪ.ʒi.lɪn ɑ.tˤɑl]

[kuː.rɑːl æn.nɪ.hæː.ʔi]
[sæ.nɑħ.miː ħɪ.mæː.ki wɑ.nɑħ.nʊ fɪ.dæ.ki]
[wɑ.næk.suː ru.bæː.ki bɪ.lɑw.nɪ‿l.ʔæ.mæl]
[sæ.nɑħ.miː ħɪ.mæː.ki wɑ.nɑħ.nʊ fɪ.dæ.ki]
[wɑ.ʕɪn.dæ ni.dæː.ki nʊ.læb.biː ʔæ.ʒæl]

English translation

I
The country of the honourable, generous fathers
And the fortress of the Book that cannot be violated.
O Mauritania, spring of harmony
And the pillar of tolerance, the breach of peace.

Chorus:
We will protect your honour and we are your servants
And cover your soil with the colour of hope.
And at your call, we will answer ‘yes’.

II
The constellations of your skies have not been veiled
and the sun of your forehead has not set.
The glorious Arabs have raised you up.
For Africa, the freshest source

Chorus

III
We suckled the milk of praise and pride
Of our nature, which bores a good harvest
and fertile pasture, even if it was barren.
We rose to Heaven, and we were pleased.

Chorus

IV
We have made your enemy drink a bitter downpour,
not allowing him to obtain shelter nor stability.
We resist him wherever he goes and wherever he comes,
chanting: "Surely, with hardship comes ease"

Chorus

(V, only sung on 57th independence day)
We followed the prophet along the path of the heavens
to the tree of glory above the sky
occupying the Pleiades as our stairway
drawing there our boundary.

Chorus

VI
We took you as a vow and carried you as a promise
and we happily give you up to the future generations

Final chorus:
We will protect your honour and we are your servants
And cover your soil with the colour of hope.
We will protect your honour and we are your servants
And at your call, we will answer ‘yes’!

=== Short version ===
On official occasions requiring brevity, a short version is sung, comprising verse one (which is repeated), the chorus (which is split before line three), verse two and verse six.

Arabic lyrics

١
بِلَادَ الْأُبَاةِ الْهُدَاةِ الْكِرَامْ
وَحِصْنَ الكِتَابِ الَّذِي لَا يُضَامْ
أَيَا مُورِيتَانِ رَبِيعَ الْوِئَامْ
وَرُكْنَ السَّمَاحَةِ ثَغْرَ السَّلَامْ

كورال:
سَنَحْمِي حِمَاكِ وَنَحْنُ فِدَاكِ
وَنَكْسُو رُبَاكِ بِلَوْنِ الْأَمَلْ

٢
بُدُورُ سَمَائِكِ لَمْ تُحْجَبِ
وَشَمْسُ جَبِينِكِ لَمْ تَغْرُبِ
نَمَاكِ الْأَمَاجِدُ مِنْ يَعْرُبِ
لِإِفْرِيقِيَّا الْمَنْبَعِ الْأَعْذَبِ

٦
أَخَذْنَاكِ عَهْدًا حَمَلْنَاكِ وَعْدًا
ونُهْدِيكِ سَعْدًا لِجِيلٍ أَطَلْ

١
بِلَادَ الْأُبَاةِ الْهُدَاةِ الْكِرَامْ
وَحِصْنَ الْكِتَابِ الَّذِي لَا يُضَامْ
أَيَا مُورِيتَانِ رَبِيعَ الْوِئَامْ
وَرُكْنَ السَّمَاحَةِ ثَغْرَ السَّلَامْ

كورال:
وَعِنْدَ نِدَاكِ نُلَبِّي أَجَلْ

Transliteration

I
Bilāda l-ʾubāti l-hudāti l-kirām
Wa-ḥisna l-kitābi l-ladhī lā yuḍām
ʾAyā Mūrītāni rabīʿa l-wiʾām
Wa-rukna s-samāḥati ṯagra s-salām

Kūrāl:
Sanaḥmī ḥimāki wa-naḥnu fidāki
Wa-naksū rubāki bilawni l-ʾamal

II
Budūru samāʾiki lam tuḥjabi
Wa-šamsu jabīniki lam tagrubi
Namāki l-ʾamājidu min yaʿrubi
Liʾifrīqīyya l-manbaʿi l-ʿaḏabi

VI
Axaḏnāki ʿahdan ḥamalnāki wa-ʿadan
Wa-nuhdīki saʿadān lijilin aṭal

I
Bilāda l-ʾubāti l-hudāti l-kirām
Wa-ḥisna l-kitābi l-ladhī lā yuḍām
ʾAyā Mūrītāni rabīʿa l-wiʾām
Wa-rukna s-samāḥati ṯagra s-salām

Kūrāl:
Wa-ʿinda nidāki nulabbī ʾajal

IPA transcription

1
[bɪ.læː.dæ‿l.ʔʊ.bæː.tɪ‿l.hʊ.dæː.tɪ‿l.ki.rɑːm]
[wɑ.ħɪs.næ‿l.ki.tæː.bɪ‿l.læ.ðiː læː jʊ.dˤɑːm]
[ʔæ.jæː muː.rɪ.tæː.ni rɑ.biː.ʕɑ‿l.wɪ.ʔæːm]
[wɑ.rʊk.næ‿s.sæ.mæː.ħɑ.ti θɑʁ.rɑ‿s.sæ.læːm]

[kuː.rɑːl]
[sæ.nɑħ.miː ħɪ.mæː.ki wɑ.nɑħ.nʊ fɪ.dæ.ki]
[wɑ.næk.suː ru.bæː.ki bɪ.lɑw.nɪ‿l.ʔæ.mæl]

2
[bʊ.duː.rʊ sæ.mæː.ʔi.ki læm tʊħ.ʒæ.bi]
[wɑ.ʃæm.sʊ ʒæ.biː.ni.ki læm tɑʁ.rʊ.bi]
[næ.mæː.kɪ‿l.ʔæ.mæː.ʒɪ.dʊ mɪn jɑʕ.rʊ.bi]
[lɪ.ʔɪf.rɪ.qɪj.jæː‿l.mæn.bɑ.ʕɪ‿l.ʕɑ.ðæ.bi]

6
[ɑ.ħɑð.næː.ki ʕɑh.dæn ħɑ.mæl.næː.ki wɑ.ʕɑ.dæn]
[wɑ.nʊh.diː.ki sɑ.ʕɑ.dæːn lɪ.ʒi.lɪn ɑ.tˤɑl]

1
[bɪ.læː.dæ‿l.ʔʊ.bæː.tɪ‿l.hʊ.dæː.tɪ‿l.ki.rɑːm]
[wɑ.ħɪs.næ‿l.ki.tæː.bɪ‿l.læ.ðiː læː jʊ.dˤɑːm]
[ʔæ.jæː muː.rɪ.tæː.ni rɑ.biː.ʕɑ‿l.wɪ.ʔæːm]
[wɑ.rʊk.næ‿s.sæ.mæː.ħɑ.ti θɑʁ.rɑ‿s.sæ.læːm]

[kuː.rɑːl]
[wɑ.ʕɪn.dæ ni.dæː.ki nʊ.læb.biː ʔæ.ʒæl]

English translation

I
The country of the honourable, generous fathers
And the fortress of the Book that cannot be violated.
O Mauritania, spring of harmony
And the pillar of tolerance, the breach of peace.

Chorus:
We will protect your honour and we are your servants
And cover your soil with the colour of hope.

II
The constellations of your skies have not been veiled
and the sun of your forehead has not set.
The glorious Arabs have raised you up.
For Africa, the freshest source

VI
We took you as a vow and carried you as a promise
and we happily give you up to the future generations

I
The country of the honourable, generous fathers
And the fortress of the Book that cannot be violated.
O Mauritania, spring of harmony
And the pillar of tolerance, the breach of peace.

Chorus:
And at your call, we will answer ‘yes’!

== See also ==
- Flag of Mauritania
- National anthem of Mauritania (1960–2017)
- Seal of Mauritania
- 2017 Mauritanian constitutional referendum
