= Mohamed Ali Ould Sidi Mohamed =

Mauritanian politician (born 1963)

Mohamed Ali Ould Sidi Mohamed (born 31 December 1963) is a Mauritanian politician. He was the minister of energy and oil of Mauritania under the transitional military regime that led the country from August 2005 to April 2007. He later served as the minister of equipment and transport from 4 July 2023 to 2 August 2024 in the Third government of Mohamed Ould Bilal.
