= Third government of Mohamed Ould Bilal =

Government of Mauritania from 2023 to 2024

- 18th Government of the Islamic Republic of Mauritania
- 2023-2024
- The cabinet in front of the Grey Palace in July 2023.
- Date formed: 4 July 2023
- Date dissolved: 2 August 2024

People and organisations
- President: Mohamed Ould Ghazouani
- Prime Minister: Mohamed Ould Bilal
- No. of ministers: 26 (Note: Does not include the Prime Minister.)
- Member parties: El Insaf; Union for Democracy and Progress
- Status in legislature: Majority coalition government
- Opposition parties: Tewassoul; Sawab–RAG; AJD/MR; Hope Mauritania; State of Justice

History
- Election: 2023 Mauritanian parliamentary election
- Legislature term: 10th National Assembly of Mauritania
- Budget: 108.1 billion MRU (2024)
- Predecessor: Ould Bilal II
- Successor: Ould Djay

The third government of Mohamed Ould Bilal was the 18th government of the Islamic Republic of Mauritania, in office from 4 July 2023 to 2 August 2024. It is a coalition between El Insaf and the Union for Democracy and Progress, whose leader Naha Mint Mouknass is the only member representing the party.

== Background ==
The government was formed after Prime Minister Mohamed Ould Bilal resigned with his government on 3 July 2023, with him being re-nominated by President Mohamed Ould Ghazouani hours later.

== Ministers ==
The list of members was announced by the Presidency of the Republic on 4 July, taking position immediately.

Most ministers from the previous government remained, with nine new ministers entering the government, of which only one was a woman.

Four appointed ministers were already serving as deputies elected in the 2023 Mauritanian parliamentary election, which opened the door to them resigning from their position as deputies.

Cabinet members
Portfolio	Minister	Took office	Left office	Party
Prime Minister	Mohamed Ould Bilal	4 July 2023	2 August 2024	El Insaf
Minister of Justice	Mohamed Mahmoud Ould Cheikh Abdoullah Ould Boya	4 July 2023	2 August 2024	El Insaf
Minister of Foreign Affairs, Cooperation and Mauritanians Abroad	Mohamed Salem Ould Merzoug	4 July 2023	2 August 2024	El Insaf
Minister of National Defense	Hanena Ould Sidi	4 July 2023	2 August 2024	El Insaf
Minister of the Interior and Decentralisation	Mohamed Ahmed Ould Mohamed Lemine	4 July 2023	2 August 2024	El Insaf
Minister of Islamic Affairs and Original Education	Dah Ould Sidi Ould Amar Taleb	4 July 2023	2 August 2024	El Insaf
Minister of Economy and Sustainable Development	Abdessalam Ould Mohamed Saleh	4 July 2023	2 August 2024	El Insaf
Minister of Finance	Isselmou Ould Mohamed M'Bady	4 July 2023	2 August 2024	El Insaf
Minister of National Education and Reform of Education System	Moktar Ould Dahi	4 July 2023	2 August 2024	El Insaf
Minister of Health	Naha Mint Mouknass	4 July 2023	2 August 2024	UDP
Minister of Public Service and Labor	Sidi Yahya Ould Cheikhna Ould Lemrabott	4 July 2023	2 August 2024	El Insaf
Minister of Digital Transformation, Innovation, and Modernization of Administration	Mohamed Abdallahi Ould Louly	4 July 2023	2 August 2024	El Insaf
Minister of Petroleum, Mines and Energy	Nany Ould Chrougha	4 July 2023	2 August 2024	El Insaf
Minister of Fishing and Maritime Economy	Moctar Al Housseynou Lam	4 July 2023	2 August 2024	El Insaf
Minister of Agriculture	Moma Ould Beïbatt Hamahoullah	4 July 2023	2 August 2024	El Insaf
Minister of Livestock	Hmeïdit Ould Cheïn	4 July 2023	2 August 2024	El Insaf
Minister of Trade, Industry, Handicrafts, and Tourism	Lemrabott Ould Bennahi	4 July 2023	2 August 2024	El Insaf
Minister of Employment and Vocational Training	Zeinebou Mint Ahmednah	4 July 2023	2 August 2024	El Insaf
Minister of Housing, Urbanism and Land Planning	Sid'Ahmed Ould Mohamed	4 July 2023	2 August 2024	El Insaf
Minister of Equipment and Transports	Mohamed Ali Ould Sidi Mohamed	4 July 2023	2 August 2024	El Insaf
Minister of Water and Sanitation	Ismael Ould Abdel Vettah	4 July 2023	2 August 2024	El Insaf
Minister of Higher Education and Scientific Research	Niang Mamoudou	4 July 2023	2 August 2024	El Insaf
Minister of Culture, Youth, Sports and Relations with Parliament	Ahmed Ould Sid’Ahmed Ould Djé	4 July 2023	2 August 2024	El Insaf
Minister of Social Action, Childhood and Family	Savia Mint N'Tahah	4 July 2023	2 August 2024	El Insaf
Minister of Environment and Sustainable Development	Lalya Ali Camara	4 July 2023	2 August 2024	El Insaf
Minister Secretary-General of Government	Aïssata Ba Yahya	4 July 2023	2 August 2024	El Insaf
Government Spokesperson
Government Spokesperson	Nany Ould Chrougha	4 July 2023	2 August 2024	El Insaf
Minister Delegate
Minister Delegate in charge of Mauritanians Abroad (Note: The Minister is delegate to the Minister of Foreign Affairs, Cooperation and Mauritanians Abroad.)	Mohamed Yahya Ould Hmednah	4 July 2023	2 August 2024	El Insaf

== Footnotes ==
Preceded by Ould Bilal II	Government of Mauritania; 2023–2024	Succeeded by Ould Djay
