= Taieb Fassi Fihri =

Moroccan politician

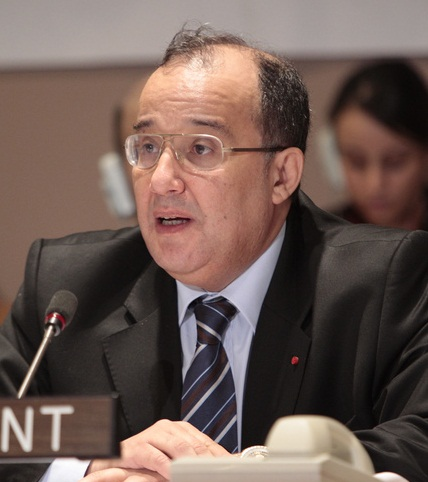
- Fassi Fihri in 2009

Minister of Foreign Affairs
- In office 15 October 2007 – 3 January 2012
- Monarch: Mohammed VI
- Prime Minister: Abbas el Fassi
- Preceded by: Mohamed Benaissa
- Succeeded by: Saadeddine Othmani

Minister delegate of Foreign Affairs and Cooperation
- In office 25 November 1999 – 15 October 2007
- Monarch: Mohammed VI
- Prime Minister: Abderrahmane Youssoufi; Driss Jettou

Secretary of State of Foreign Affairs and Cooperation
- In office 11 November 1993 – March 1998
- Monarch: Hassan II
- Prime Minister: Mohammed Karim Lamrani; Abdellatif Filali; Abderrahmane Youssoufi

Personal details
- Born: 9 April 1958 (age 68) Casablanca, Morocco
- Party: Independent

Taieb Fassi Fihri (born 9 April 1958) is a Moroccan politician who is Counselor to King Mohammed VI since 2 January 2012. Previously, he served in all successive governments between 1993 and 2012, first as Secretary of State and subsequently as Minister of Foreign Affairs. "

== Education and career ==
Fassi-Fihri graduated from the Descartes High School in Rabat with a French Baccalaureate in mathematics in June 1976. In 1980, he received the title of Application Engineer in Statistics at the National Institute of Statistics and Applied Economics (INSEA) in Rabat. In 1981, he obtained a Master's degree in "Public Economics and Planning" from the University Paris 1 Panthéon-Sorbonne. Then, in 1984, he obtained a Ph.D. in Economic Analysis and Policy at the Institute of Political Studies in Paris (Sciences Po).

Taïeb Fassi-Fihri became in June 1986 head of the division at the Ministry of Foreign Affairs and Cooperation in charge of relations with the European Community. In this capacity, he took part in the negotiations on relations between Morocco and the EEC.

In November 1989, he became director of the cabinet of the Minister of Foreign Affairs and Cooperation.

On 11 November 1993, Fassi-Fihri was appointed Secretary of State for Foreign Affairs and Cooperation; he retained this role in successive governments in June 1994, February 1995 and August 1997. He was also appointed chargé de mission at the Royal Cabinet on 16 March 1998.

On 25 November 1999, Fassi-Fihri was appointed minister delegate of Foreign Affairs and Cooperation.

On 4 July 2002, Fassi-Fihri was appointed the coordinator, responsible and sole interlocutor of the US authorities for the negotiation of the Morocco–United States Free Trade Agreement.

On 7 November 2002, he was appointed Minister for Foreign Affairs and Cooperation.

On 15 October 2007, he was designated Minister of Foreign Affairs and Cooperation under the new government of Abbas El Fassi.

On 2 January 2012, he was appointed Counsellor to King Mohammed VI at the Royal Cabinet.

== Personal life ==
Fassi Fihri's brother, Ali Fassi Fihri, was the president of the Moroccan FA and CEO of the National Company of Electricity and Water. Taieb Fassi Fihri is also the cousin of former Prime Minister Abbas el Fassi.

Taieb Fassi Fihri is married to painter Fathiya Tahiri. Their son, Brahim Fassi Fihri, is founder and president of the Amadeus Institute think tank.
