= National Institute of Statistics and Applied Economics =

Moroccan higher education school

- Formation Center Of Engineers in Statistics Works
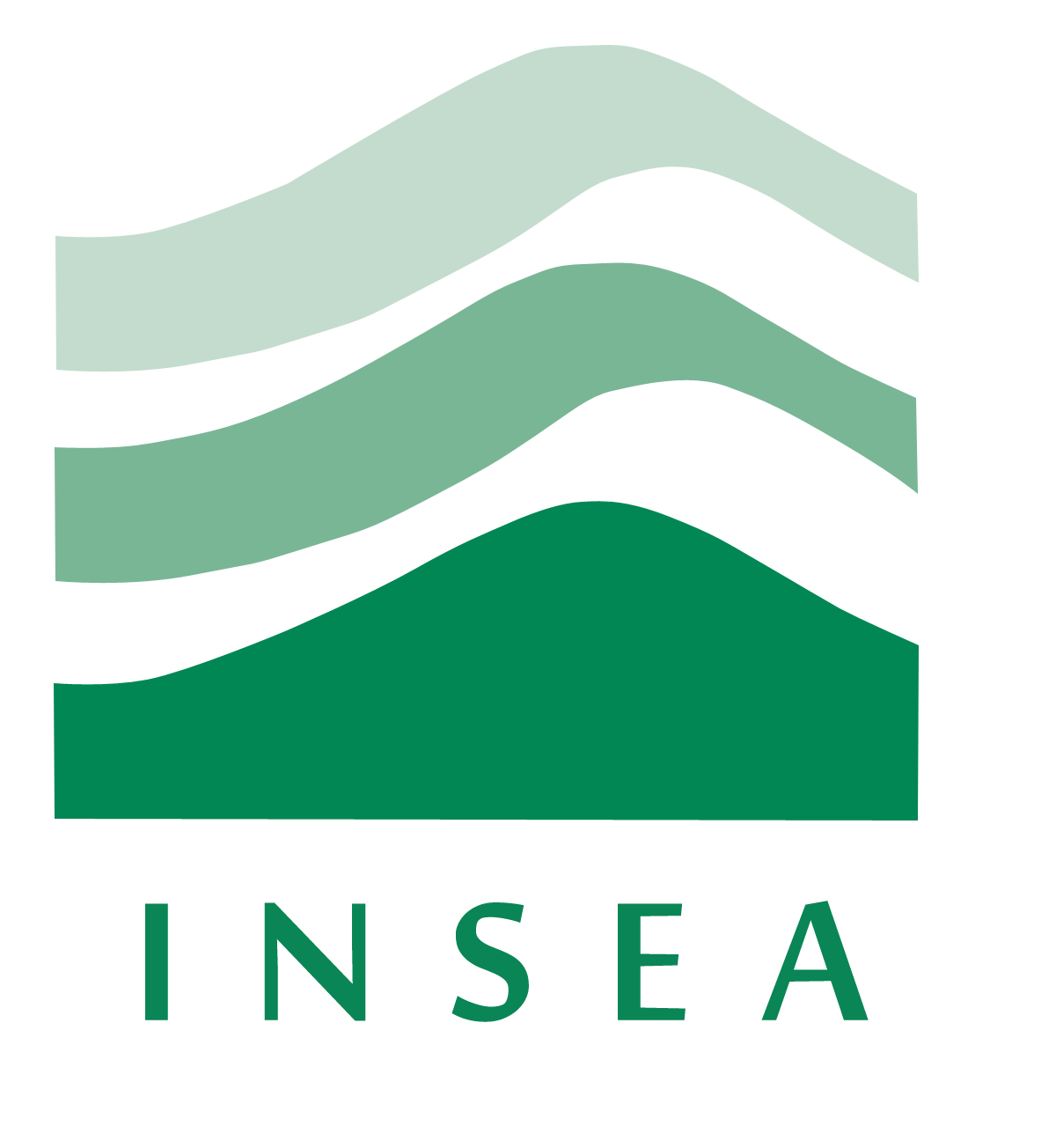
- Type: Public
- Established: 1961
- Affiliations: Haut Commissariat au Plan
- Director: Mohamed Jaouad EL QASMI
- Students: 800
- Location: Rabat, Morocco; 33.982°N 6.862°W
- Campus: Madinat Al Irfane
- Colours: Medium grey, spring green and dark green
- Website: www.insea.ac.ma

The National Institute of Statistics and Applied Economics (INSEA) (Arabic: المعهد الوطني للإحصاء والاقتصاد التطبيقي, romanized: Al-Maʻhad al-Waṭanī lil-Iḥṣāʼ wa-al-Iqtiṣād al-Taṭbīqī) is one of the oldest engineering schools in Morocco and remains to this day one of the most prestigious Moroccan Grandes écoles in engineering. Located in Rabat and created in 1961, its latest naming has changed by Royal Decree from the appellation The Training Centre of Engineers in Statistics in 1967 with the support of the Economic Commission for Africa (ECA).

== Introduction ==
INSEA provides training that gives equal weight to statistics and economic analysis, and offers a specialization in the fields of computing, finance, actuarial and demographic sciences, as well as operations research. It is the first engineering school that has offered training in computers at the national level, and has introduced the first computer into the kingdom in 1974.

INSEA graduates have different sought-after skills that allow them to perform statistical analysis, economic forecasting, as well as engineering of information systems. They are also capable of developing models that can contribute to market analysis, or measure and evaluate different types of risk in a variety of areas.

Furthermore, the training INSEA is not limited to technical aspects of engineering, it also includes management, communication and quality courses related to the socio-economic and political environment of Morocco. Graduates of INSEA are expected to play a strategic role at various stages of the process of economic and social development, pursuing careers in the public sector, local communities and the private sector: bank companies' insurance and large companies and national multinationals.

The institute is under the supervision of the High Commissioner for Planning, National Board of Economic Planning of the country.

== Specializations and careers ==
Actuarial Sciences and Finance

The rapid development of financial markets worldwide, has expanded considerably to the theory of finance, so the banking, insurance and large companies need "experts" in this field. In this perspective, INSEA began training engineers actuarial funding status since 1998, engineers familiar with the new financial theories, while mastering tools, mathematics and statistics at top level. A state engineer holds a Diploma in Actuarial INSEA-finance can work in multiple markets such as market operators: they take positions and manage mission-oriented investment, hedging or speculation on behalf of institutions or customers; official who follows the market activities and control risk; fund manager: making investment choices, or take positions to ensure better use of the wallet, within the constraints of legislation and contracts spent with clients, managing assets / liabilities: Advisor of the Directorate General in the asset and liabilities, or organizer: adaptation and modernization of tools and methods.

Biostatistics, Demography, and Big Data

The aim of the Biostatistics, Demography, and Big Data program is to equip students with multidisciplinary skills for careers that combine Statistics (and its counterpart "Big Data"), Demography, Biomedical Sciences, and Big Data tools (languages and platforms). The curriculum provides a multidisciplinary education characterized by a breadth of advanced courses in Statistics/Biostatistics, Demography, Sociology, and Sustainable Development, survey methodology, forecasting techniques, and the ability to utilize both conventional data and unconventional sources such as data from web traces (Internet of Things, Social Networks, satellite data, mobile telephony...) with added value from knowledge and methods of machine learning for Big Data utilization.

Data Science

The objective of the program is to train a specialized profile in the management and sharp analysis of massive data, "Big Data." This sought-after profile, namely the "Data Scientist," integrates the profiles of "Data Analyst" and "Data Engineer"; they are capable of generating predicted values from raw data. Based on multiple, scattered, and unstructured data sources, they determine prediction models and indicators allowing the implementation of a strategy addressing a specific problem. They are therefore specialized in Computer Science, Statistics, and Applied Mathematics.

The engineer also benefits from courses in Economics, Entrepreneurship, Sociology, Communication, and languages to reinforce soft skills.

This training allows the Data Scientist engineer from INSEA to analyze any type of problem related to massive data, propose suitable and quality computing solutions and prediction models, easily integrate into the professional world, and intervene in all areas and specializations of Data Science.

Data and Software Engineering

Developments in computer science have contributed to the integration of large-scale data processing technologies into software development, with an emphasis on designing systems with reliable and scalable architectures. The Data and Software Engineering program at INSEA incorporates these topics into its curriculum and aims to prepare graduates for roles such as data engineer or software development consultant. The program provides training relevant to careers in both data processing and software development, bringing these areas together within an engineering curriculum offered in Morocco.

Operational Research

Operations research is the application of scientific method to master the complex problems encountered in the direction and management systems in industry, commerce and administration. The aim is to take an aid to decision making. The curriculum at INSEA attempts to provide both: a preparation for life in Operations Research, research and preparation of OR in the following areas: Combinatorial optimization, Graphs and Combinatorics and Discrete Mathematics. Through cross-training acquired in INSEA, the engineer in OR is as much an expert analysis of organizational processes and phenomena that specializes in the management, design and operation of systems information. It can therefore work in the following areas: computerization of a business information management (job description), analysis of financial flows (work schedule), designing databases, development of Master Plan (quality control ) management of telecommunications (forecast) and also in the system design decision support (inventory management).

Applied Economics, Statistics, and Big Data

The objective of this program is to train students in various techniques to acquire a profile as a statistician-economist engineer whose skills can be applied in all sectors of the economy, industry, and services. Upon completion of this training, students will be capable of adapting to issues arising from different sectors of activity, innovating, and employing new methods of data collection, processing, and statistical and econometric analysis to carry out projects meeting the needs of the administration or the private sector: industry, banking sector, polling institutes, services, etc.

== Student life ==
INSEA offers students a residence with a capacity of 670 persons (290 in Buildings A and B, 240 in buildings C and D and 140 provided in the building E). The rooms are individual. INSEA has developed since 1994 in a restaurant that prepares about 600 meals a day. The institute also has a library and a computer center with more than 100 machines.

== Parascolar activities ==
Forum of National Engineering elite Schools - GENI Rabat

The event, organized by INSEA together with two other major engineering schools in Madinat Al Irfane: INPT and ENSIAS is the Forum Student-Company Number 1 in Morocco on the one hand the number of visitors and other hand the number of participating companies and organizations. It is a meeting between students engineers, graduates and professional world. For this an exhibition space is available to participating companies to recruit and offer internships for engineering students, present their work and promote their image through the extensive media campaign covering the event. It is also an opportunity to discuss the theme through many conferences and roundtables throughout the two days of the event.

This event also knows the presence of several personalities such as ministers, CEOs and CEO of large organizations.

The next edition of the Forum G.E.N.I. will take place in 2014 to the INPT.

== Partnership and cooperation ==
The National Institute of Statistics and Applied Economics INSEA concluded partnership agreements in research and training with several international institutions.

- National School of Statistics and Economic Administration ENSAE Paris - France
- National School of Statistics and Information Analysis ENSAI - École nationale de la statistique et de l'analyse de l'information - France
- Reims Management School - France
- Université Laval - Quebec - Canada
- UCLouvain: Université catholique de Louvain - Belgium

== Directors of the Institute ==
- 1977 - 1996: Dr. Benyakhlef
- 1996 - 2006: Mr. Abdelaziz Ghazali
- 2008 - 2011: Mr. Abdelaziz Maalmi
- 2011 - 2013: Mr. Abdelaziz Chaoubi
- 2013 - 2016: PhD. Abdeslam Fazouane
- 2020–Present Mr. Mohamed Jaouad El Qasmi

== Notable graduates ==
- Taieb Fassi Fihri, Moroccan Minister of Foreign Affairs and Cooperation.
- Mohamed Horani, CEO of HPS and president of the General Confederation of Enterprises of Morocco (CGEM).
- Anis Birou, Secretary of State to the Minister of Tourism and Handicrafts, in charge of crafts in the Abbas El Fassi Government.
- Abdelaziz Rebbah, Minister of Transportations and former deputy and mayor of Kenitra and within the framework Justice and Development Party (PJD).
- Rkizi Chakib, Director General of the trading floor of Attijariwafa Bank.
- Wafaa (Bahjawi) Mamilli, Global Chief Digital and Technology Officer at Roche.
- Mohamed Amine Bouabid, CEO of Salafin.
- Mohamed Saad, Chairman of MIT-GOV.
- Koudama Zeroual, Director at Wafa Assurance.
- Abdelaziz Mâalmi, President of the Union of Arab statisticians (ASU).
- Taamouti Mohamed, Director at Bank-Al-Maghrib.
- Saad Benjebbour, executive director at EFT "Banque Saudi Fransi (Saudi Arabia).
- El Hassan Adnani, Head of Risk Management at the People's Central Bank.
- Said Akram, Head of Research and Development at the Office des Changes.
- Adel Messouad, Head databases OHCHR Plan (HCP).
- Abdelkader Salmi, Head of R&D at the WRC.
- Abdennour Laaroubi, Entrepreneur and VP of Information Technology, Enpro, USA
- Lahcen Achy Deputy Director at International Monetary Fund ( Regional Training Center Kuwait).

== Associations ==
- ADEI Association des élèves ingénieurs de l'INSEA,
- Sigma 21, Association des lauréats de l'INSEA.
- Innovation Edge
- INSEA IT
- INSEA Art
- AMJI, Association marocaine des jeunes ingénieurs.
- FORUM GENI, Forum des grandes écoles nationales d'ingénieurs.
- CLUB INSEA TV
- CLUB SOCIAL
- CLUB GOLDEN MEAN INSEA
