= 2017 Mauritanian constitutional referendum =

- 5 August 2017

Constitutional amendments relating to the institutions of the Republic
For	85.61%
Against	9.99%
Neutral	4.40%

Constitutional amendment modifying the flag and the national anthem
For	85.67%
Against	10.02%
Neutral	4.31%

A two-part constitutional referendum was held in Mauritania on 5 August 2017, having initially been planned for 15 July. Voters were asked whether they approve of proposed amendments to the constitution. Both proposals were approved by 86% of voters with a voter turnout of 54%.

== Proposed amendments ==
The referendum was split into two questions on different proposed reforms. One covered abolition of the indirectly-elected Senate and its replacement with regional councils, as well as merging the Islamic High Council and the national Ombudsman into a 'Supreme Council of the Fatwa'. The second question covered national symbols, including a proposal to change the national flag by adding a red band at the top and bottom to symbolize "the efforts and sacrifices that the people of Mauritania will keep consenting, to the price of their blood, to defend their territory", as well as modifying the national anthem.

National flag proposition, as shown to the parliament in the debates

A proposal to allow President Mohamed Ould Abdel Aziz to run for a third term was dropped after protests in Nouadhibou.

Although 141 of the 147 members of the National Assembly voted in favour of the changes, they were rejected by the Senate in March 2017, with 33 of its 56 members voting against, including 24 members of the ruling Union for the Republic.

== Campaign ==
Former President Sidi Ould Cheikh Abdallahi called for voters to oppose the changes, claiming it would be a "constitutional coup". The opposition coalition, the National Forum for Democracy and Unity, also rejected the changes. The official campaign began on 21 July.

== Results ==
=== Constitutional reforms ===
Choice	Votes	%
For	584,084	85.61
Neutral	30,039	4.40
Against	68,124	9.99
Invalid/blank votes	64,408	–
Total	746,655	100.00
Registered voters/turnout	1,389,092	53.75
Source: Al Akhbar

=== National symbols ===
Adopted national flag

Choice	Votes	%
For	573,935	85.67
Neutral	28,894	4.31
Against	67,146	10.02
Invalid/blank votes	76,314	–
Total	746,289	100.00
Registered voters/turnout	1,389,092	53.72
Source: Al Akhbar
