= Mohamed Melainine Ould Eyih =

Mauritanian educationalist and politician

Minister of Secondary Education and Technical and Vocational Training
- In office 9 August 2019 – 6 August 2020
- Succeeded by: (self)

Minister of National Education and Reform of Education System
- In office 9 August 2020 – 6 September 2022
- Preceded by: (self)
- Succeeded by: Adama Bokar Soko

Personal details
- Born: 15 December 1968 (age 57)
- Occupation: Educationalist; politician

Mohamed Melainine Ould Eyih (Note: Arabic: محمد ماء العينين ولد أييه) (born 15 December 1968) is a Mauritanian politician and educationalist. He served as Minister of National Education and Education System Reform from 2019 to 2022.

== Educationalist ==
Mohamed Melainine Ould Eyih was born on 15 December 1968 in Atar, Mauritania. From September 1990 to October 1995 he was a teacher at the Nouakchott Technical High School. From October 1995 to October 1997 he was an expert advisor on engineering training at the Resource and Monitoring Center for Technical Education and Vocational Training (CRES). From October 1997 to July 2002 he was coordinator of the CRES.

From July 2002 to August 2015 Mohamed Melainine O. Eyih was Director of the National Institute for the Promotion of Technical and Vocational Training (INAP-FTP). From August 2015 to August 2019 he was Coordinator of the SWEDD Project: Women's Empowerment and Demographic Dividend in the Sahel, which was funded by the World Bank.

== Minister ==
On 9 August 2019 Mohamed Melainine Ould Eyih took office as Minister of Secondary Education and Technical and Vocational Training in the government of prime minister Ismaïl Ould Bedde Ould Cheikh Sidiya. On 9 August 2020, Mohamed Aïnina Ould Eyih was named Minister of National Education, Reform, Technical Training and Reform in the cabinet of prime minister Mohamed Ould Bilal.

In August 2021 the Ministry of National Education announced that just 8% of secondary school leavers had succeeded in passing the 2021 baccalaureate, making them eligible for higher education. This compared to 16% in 2020. Higher education enrolment in Mauritania at 5.76% is far lower than in neighboring Morocco (38%), Algeria (51%) and Tunisia (32%). Mohamed Melainine Ould Eyih said “Weak baccalaureate results were expected due to the structural imbalances in the educational system, the impact of two years of the pandemic, and new procedures for regulating exams ... These baccalaureate results will be subject to careful analysis in order to re-structure the secondary education divisions.”

In September 2021 Mohamed Melainine Ould Eyih visited the Kouroudjel school. There he announced launch of a national school nutrition program. In February 2022 a coalition of education unions called a five-day strike, which was observed by most teachers. Issues included inadequate salaries and bonuses, use of assistant teachers, unfair treatment of teachers on permanent contracts and failure to allocate land or housing to teachers. Mohamed Melainine Ould Eyih was reported to have said "the strike will achieve nothing".

In March 2022 Prime Minister Mohamed Ould Bilal announced that his government had resigned after receiving strong criticism from President Ghazouani. On 31 March 2022 Mohamed Melainine Ould Eyih was named Minister of National Education and Reform of the Educational System, and also Government Spokesperson.

In July 2022 the National Assembly of Mauritania passed a new law under which sciences would be taught in their native language to speakers of languages such as Hassaniya, Wolof, Peul and Soninké. These students would also be taught Arabic. Mohamed Melainine Ould Eyih said the purpose was to "put an end to the alarming deterioration of the national education system". Black activists decried the law, which they said "enshrines the linguistic injustice in the country".

In July 2022 President Mohamed Ould Ghazouani renamed the Union pour la République (UPR) to Parti El Insaf, meaning "fairness" or "equity" in Arabic. Mohamed Malainine Ould Eyih was made leader of the new party.

== Later career ==
In September 2022 Mauritanian President Mohamed Ould Cheikh El Ghazouani made some changes to the cabinet of Prime Minister Mohamed Ould Bilal. Adama Bocar Soko, Minister of Agriculture, was made Minister of National Education and Reform of the Education System in place of Mohamed Melainine Ould Eyih, who was leaving the government to focus on his presidency of the ruling party, Equity Party, before the next elections.

During the run-up to the 29 June 2024 presidential elections, as president of the Equity Party founded in 2022 by President Mohamed Cheikh Ould El Ghazouani, Mohamed Melainine Ould Eyih met with a Polisario delegation.

== Diplomas ==
- Master's degree in Economic Sciences, Specialization: Work, Employment, Training, Specialization: Training Engineering and Employment Systems / University of Toulouse 1, Social Sciences – France.
- Master's degree in technical education at the Higher Center for Technical Education and ENNA of Paris-Nord.

== Sources ==
- Assaba : Lancement du programme national de nutrition scolaire au profit de 41 700 élèves (in French), Kankossa: Ministre de l’Éducation Nationale, 2021-09-02
- Formation d'un nouveau gouvernement mauritanien (in French), Nouakchott: Agence Mauritanienne d'Information, 9 August 2020, archived from the original on 2020-08-13
- Latifa Babas (3 June 2024), "Polisario delegation visits Mauritania ahead of presidential elections", Yabiladi.com
- "Mauritanie : liste du nouveau gouvernement (ENCADRE)", Xinhua (in French)
- "Mauritania passes controversial bill on national languages in primary school", Africa News
- "Mauritanie : remaniement ministériel partiel et permutations", Sahara Media (in French), 7 September 2022
- "Mauritania: teachers strike for a decent life and better working conditions", Education International, 23 February 2022
- Mohamed Melainine Ould Eyih (in French), Mauritanian Prime Ministry
- Presidency of Republic Announces Formation of New Government, Agence Mauritanienne d'Information, 1 April 2022
- Seidu M. Alidu; Banedikt Kamski; Andreas Mehler; David Sebudubudu, eds. (2023), Africa Yearbook Volume 19: Politics, Economy and Society South of the Sahara in 2022, BRILL, ISBN 978-90-04-53811-5
- Wagdy Sawahel (2 September 2021), "Poor baccalaureate results a blow to enrolment rate", University World News
