= Mohamed Ould Bilal =

16th Prime Minister of Mauritania

- محمد ولد بلال
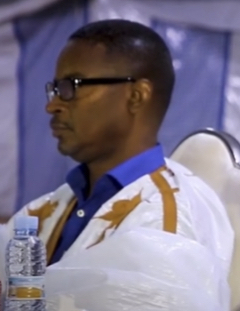
- Bilal in 2022

Prime Minister of Mauritania
- In office 6 August 2020 – 2 August 2024
- President: Mohamed Ould Ghazouani
- Preceded by: Ismail Ould Bedde Ould Cheikh Sidiya
- Succeeded by: Mokhtar Ould Djay

Personal details
- Born: 10 December 1963 (age 62) Rosso, Mauritania
- Party: Equity Party (El Insaf)
- Children: 5
- Cabinet: First (2020–2022); Second (2022–2023); Third (2023–2024)

Mohamed Ould Bilal (Arabic: محمد ولد بلال; born 10 December 1963), is a Mauritanian politician who served as Prime Minister of Mauritania from 2020 to 2024. Prior to his tenure as prime minister he was Minister of Equipment, Urban Planning and Housing from 2007 to 2008.

== Early life and education ==
Mohamed Ould Bilal was born in Rosso, Mauritania, on 10 December 1963. He graduated from the Sanitation Institution National School of Hydraulics in Blida, Algeria. He received a diploma in management sciences from MIT University in Dakar, Senegal, and a Doctor of Business Administration from IAE Lyon.

== Career ==
From 1996 to 2000, Bilal was deputy director in charge of the Food Security Commission's campaign against poverty. Bilal was a general manager of the Arab Society of Metallurgical Industries from 2008 to 2010, at the Sanitation, Works, Transport and Maintenance Company from 2010 to 2013, and at the Mauritanian Electricity Company from 2013 to 2014.

In the Ministry of Equipment Bilal was director of public works from 2005 to 2007. From 2007 to 2008, Bilal was Minister of Equipment, Urban Planning and Housing. From February 2019 to 6 August 2020, he was a project manager in the office of Prime Minister Mohamed Salem Ould Béchir.

Prime Minister Ismail Ould Bedde Ould Cheikh Sidiya resigned and President Mohamed Ould Ghazouani selected Bilal to replace him on 6 August 2020. Bilal resigned on 2 August 2024, one day after Ghazouani was sworn into office for his second term.

== Personal life ==
Bilal can speak Arabic, English, and French. He is married and is the father of five children.

== Works cited ==
=== News ===
- "Nouakchott: Le Premier ministre Mohamed Ould Bilal présente démission de son gouvernement". MADAR. 2 August 2024. Archived from the original on 29 June 2025.
- "Veteran administrator Mohamed Ould Bilal named Mauritania's new PM". Reuters. 6 August 2020.
- Ging, John (7 August 2020). "Mauritanian Prime Minister replaced amid investigation into alleged corruption". Africanews. Archived from the original on 29 June 2025.

=== Web ===
- "Mohamed Ould Bilal Messoud". Prime Minister of Mauritania. Archived from the original on 3 February 2023.

Political offices
Preceded by Ismail Ould Bedde Ould Cheikh Sidiya	Prime Minister of Mauritania; 2020–2024	Succeeded by Mokhtar Ould Djay
