= Ismail Ould Bedde Ould Cheikh Sidiya =

Mauritanian politician

- إسماعيل ولد بده ولد الشيخ سيديا
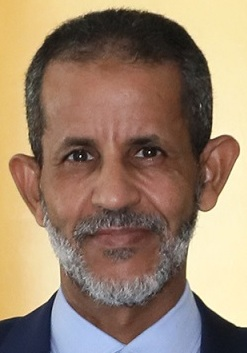
- Sidiya in 2019

15th Prime Minister of Mauritania
- In office 5 August 2019 – 6 August 2020
- President: Mohamed Ould Ghazouani
- Preceded by: Mohamed Salem Ould Béchir
- Succeeded by: Mohamed Ould Bilal

Personal details
- Born: 17 March 1961 (age 65) Boutilimit, Mauritania
- Party: Union for the Republic (UPR)
- Education: École Centrale Paris

Ismail Ould Bedde Ould Cheikh Sidiya (Arabic: إسماعيل ولد بده ولد الشيخ سيديا, born 17 March 1961) is a Mauritanian politician who served as the 15th Prime Minister of Mauritania from 5 August 2019 to 6 August 2020. He headed the Ministry of Housing, Town Planning and Regional Development from 2009 to 2014, as well as once being president of the Nouadhibou Free Zone. He was one of the founding members of the Union for the Republic party.

== Biography ==
Sidiya was born in Boutilimit and holds an engineering degree from Central School of Paris, with his graduate studies between Toulouse and Paris.

Sidiya began his career as head of the Bureau of Studies and Programming of the National Industrial and Mining Company (SNIM) then General Manager of CompuNet. He became the General Manager of the ETASCO Research Department before becoming coordinator of the new town project of Boutilimit.

He was the general director of the government agency in charge of the town of Tindame's reconstruction after it was washed away by torrential rains in 2008. He served as the Minister of Housing, Town Planning and Regional Development from 2009 to 2014, as well as once being president of the Nouadhibou Free Zone. He did not have a specific position after this period but continued working with his political party.

On 3 August 2019, Sidiya was designated as the Prime Minister of Mauritania by President Mohamed Ould Ghazouani, who Sidiya had campaigned for in the Gorgol Region. Some observers criticized his appointment as a continuation of the old system.

== Politics ==
In 2010, as the Minister of Housing, Town Planning and Regional Development, Sidiya stated that the housing problem was exacerbated by economic inequality and that homelessness was the most pressing factor in poverty and exclusion, as well as noting that most of the Arab world were struggling with increased rural flight and urbanization over the past decades. He stated that Mauritania had a plan to remove outlying districts of Nouakchott, regional capitals, and inner cities to allow the poor to access resources, though he did not state how.

Political offices
Preceded by Mohamed Salem Ould Béchir	Prime Minister of Mauritania; 2019–2020	Succeeded by Mohamed Ould Bilal
