= List of cities in Mauritania =

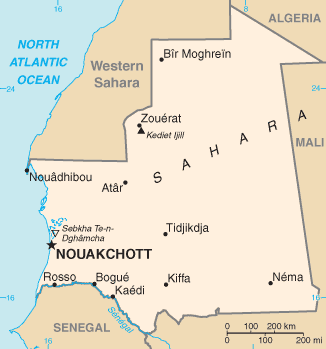
Map of Mauritania

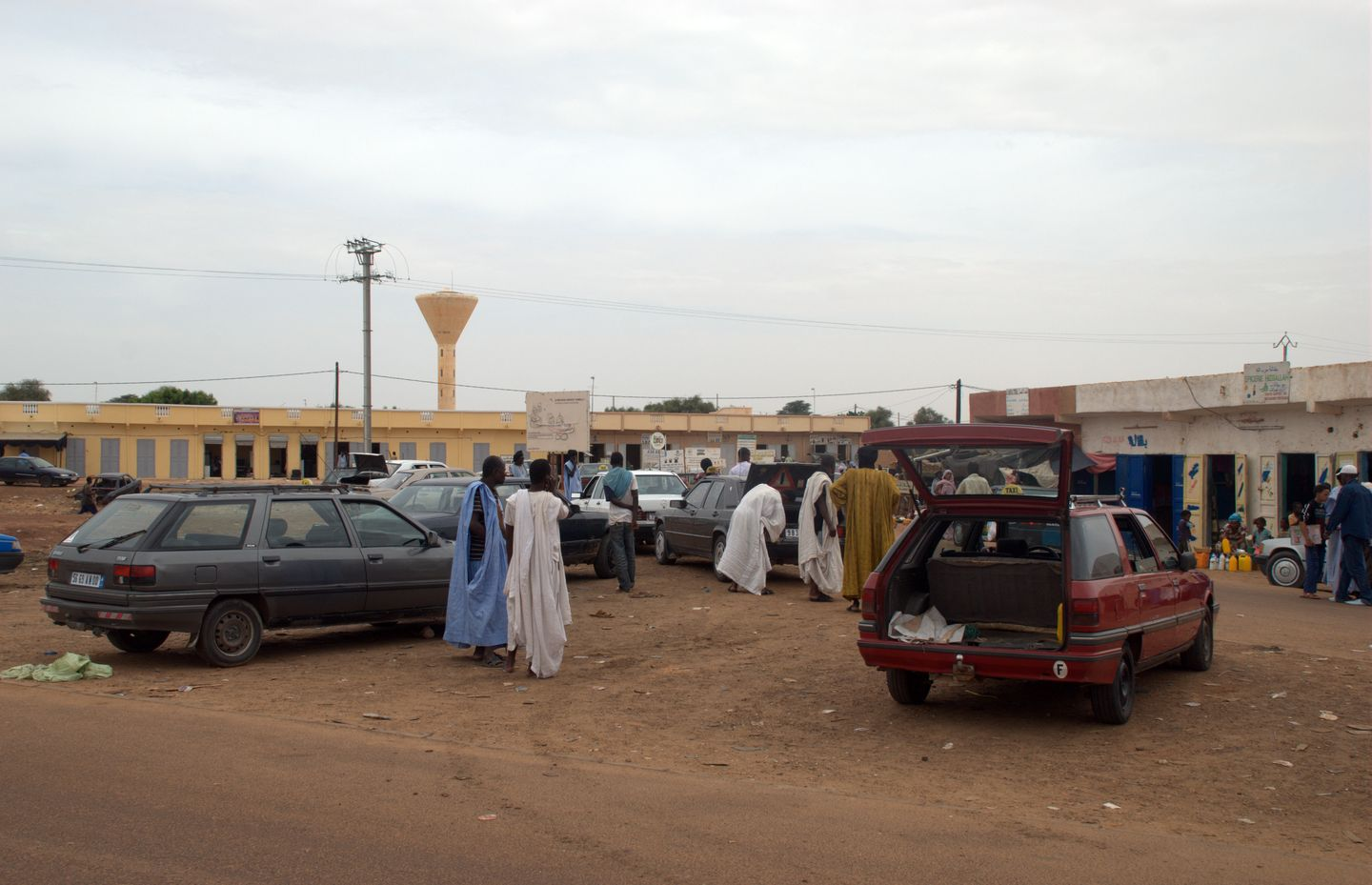
Boghé (بوكى)

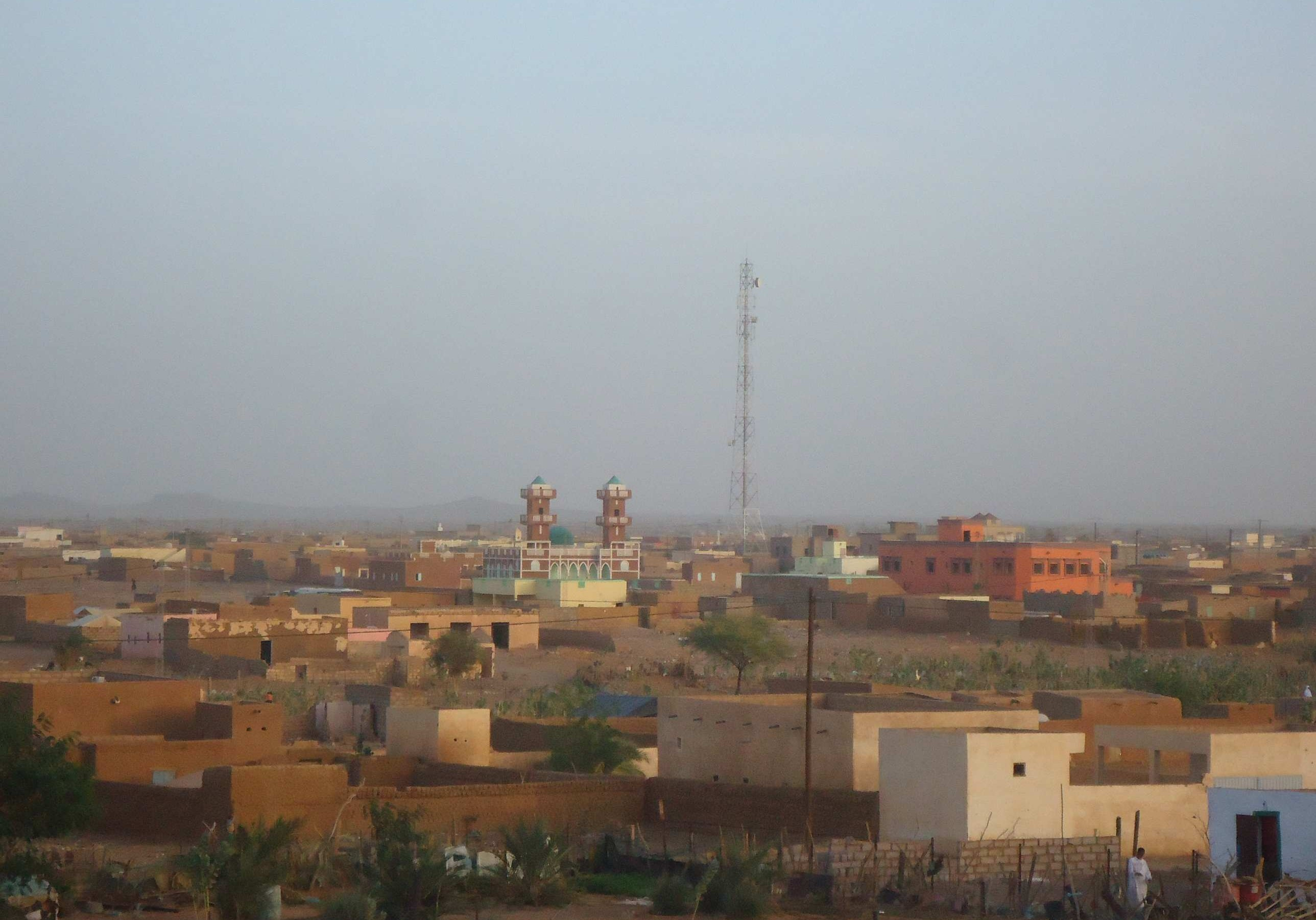
Akjoujt (اكجوجت)

This is a list of cities in Mauritania by population. All settlements with a population over 10,000 are listed.

Cities in Mauritania
Rank	Name		Population				Region
Rank	Transcription	Arabic	1988 Census	2000 Census	2013 Census	2023 Census	Region
1	Nouakchott	انواكشوط	393,325	558,195	958,399	1,446,761	Nouakchott
2	Nouadhibou	انواديبو	59,198	72,337	118,167	173,525	Dakhlet Nouadhibou
3	Kiffa	كيفة	29,292	25,679	50,206	84,101	Assaba
4	Fassala	فصالة	N/A	N/A	65,927	79,508	Hodh Ech Chargui
5	Kaédi	كيهيدي	30,515	31,310	45,539	62,790	Gorgol
6	Zouérat	الزويرات	25,892	33,929	44,649	62,380	Tiris Zemmour
7	Rosso	روصو	12,557	29,882	33,581	61,156	Brakna
8	Boghé	بوغي	N/A	N/A	40,341	50,205	Brakna
9	Sélibabi	سليبابي	29,292	32,716	40,281	44,966	Guidimaka
10	Mbera Refugee Camp	امبره	-	-	47,725	41,256 (Note: The UNHCR estimates this number to be 154,000.)	Hodh Ech Chargui
11	Guerou	كرو	9,665	15,589	20,167	40,315	Assaba
12	Adel Bagrou	عدل بكرو	N/A	N/A	N/A	37,048	Hodh Ech Chargui
13	Aïoun	عيون	12,445	11,867	24,199	36,517	Hodh El Gharbi
14	Hamoud	حمود	N/A	20,867	23,528	36,448	Assaba
15	Atar	أطار	21,366	24,021	25,728	35,171	Adrar
16	Gouraye	غوري	N/A	18,073	20,378	35,021	Guidimaka
17	Timbedra	تنبدغة	N/A	N/A	23,762	34,244	Hodh Ech Chargui
18	Foum Gleita	فوم ليجليت	N/A	15,700	17,702	33,314	Gorgol
19	Boutilimit	بوتلميت	14,545	22,257	27,170	32,347	Trarza
20	Tamourt Neaj		N/A	N/A	N/A	30,545	Tagant
21	Bouhdida	أبو حديدة	N/A	10,828	N/A	27,203	Brakna
22	Aleg	آلاك	9,635	12,898	15,211	27,120	Brakna
23	Aghoratt	أغورط	N/A	N/A	N/A	26,540	Assaba
24	Magta-Lahjar	مقطع الحجار	N/A	12,117	22,521	25,704	Brakna
25	Oum Avnadech	أم آفنادش	N/A	N/A	N/A	25,059	Hodh Ech Chargui
26	Diogountourou		N/A	N/A	N/A	24,833	Guidimaka
27	Hassichegar	حاسي شقار	N/A	N/A	20,265	24,667	Guidimaka
28	Soudoud	سودود	N/A	16,392	18,482	24,387	Tagant
29	Blajmil	بلاجميل	N/A	N/A	N/A	24,030	Assaba
30	Kankossa	كنكوصة	N/A	N/A	N/A	23,435	Assaba
31	Modibougou	موديبوغو	N/A	12,677	16,550	23,410	Hodh El Gharbi
32	Oum Echeiche		N/A	N/A	N/A	22,910	Hodh Ech Chargui
33	Maghama	مقامة	N/A	N/A	16,102	22,551	Gorgol
34	Djeol	جول	N/A	N/A	N/A	22,252	Gorgol
35	Arr	عر	N/A	N/A	17,085	22,144	Guidimaka
36	Djiguenni	جكني	N/A	10,862	N/A	22,101	Hodh Ech Chargui
37	Tenaha	تناها	N/A	N/A	N/A	21,765	Assaba
38	El Ghabra	الغبرة	N/A	N/A	15,480	21,562	Assaba
39	Dafor	الدافوع	N/A	N/A	15,844	21,190	Guidimaka
40	Bassiknou	باسكنو	N/A	N/A	10,561	21,252	Hodh Ech Chargui
41	Voulaniya	الفلانية	N/A	9,460	12,920	21,184	Hodh El Gharbi
42	Djeigui		N/A	N/A	N/A	20,949	Hodh Ech Chargui
43	Elmesgoul Lebyadh		N/A	N/A	N/A	20,787	Hodh Ech Chargui
44	Leouossy	العويسي	N/A	11,095	N/A	20,703	Assaba
45	Gogui	كوكي	N/A	N/A	N/A	20,553	Hodh El Gharbi
46	Bouly	بولي	N/A	N/A	14,906	20,484	Guidimaka
47	Bareina	برينة	N/A	22,041	24,852	19,954	Trarza
48	Tidjikdja	تجكجة	10,904	13,532	14,751	19,386	Tagant
49	Kobenni	كوبني	N/A	6,291	11,833	19,250	Hodh El Gharbi
50	Timzine	تمزين	N/A	N/A	N/A	19,123	Hodh El Gharbi
51	Tachott	التاشوط	N/A	N/A	15,099	19,073	Guidimaka
52	Aere Mbar	آرى امبار	N/A	13,722	N/A	19,050	Brakna
53	Touil	الطويل	N/A	N/A	N/A	18,777	Hodh Ech Chargui
54	Akjoujt	اكجوجت	N/A	N/A	11,235	18,138	Inchiri
55	Rkiz	الركيز	N/A	10,688	N/A	17,871	Trarza
56	Lexeiba	ليجيبا	N/A	14,908	16,809	17,415	Gorgol
57	Tiguent	تكنت	N/A	N/A	12,579	17,659	Trarza
58	Azgueilem Tiyab	أزكليم التياب	N/A	9,056	N/A	17,266	Gorgol
59	Chleikha		N/A	N/A	N/A	16,852	Guidimaka
60	Mbout	امبود	N/A	N/A	N/A	16,813	Gorgol
61	Ain Varba	عين فربة	N/A	N/A	11,728	16,260	Hodh El Gharbi
62	Boû Gâdoûm	بوكادوم	N/A	29,045	32,749	16,099	Hodh Ech Chargui
63	Bourat		N/A	N/A	N/A	16,059	Brakna
64	Leghligue	القليك	N/A	N/A	N/A	16,051	Hodh El Gharbi
65	Lexeiba		N/A	N/A	N/A	15,635	Trarza
66	Hassimhadi	حاس إمهادي	N/A	N/A	13,948	15,624	Hodh Ech Chargui
67	Hassi Ehel Ahmed Bechna	ایک گاؤں ہے	N/A	N/A	N/A	15,517	Hodh El Gharbi
68	Tekane	تيكان	N/A	22,041	N/A	15,304	Trarza
69	Ouad Amour	وادي أمور	N/A	10,419	N/A	15,291	Brakna
70	Dar El Barka	دار البركة	N/A	12,353	N/A	15,248	Brakna
71	El Megve	المكفة	N/A	7,612	N/A	15,232	Hodh Ech Chargui
72	Devaa	ديفع	N/A	N/A	10,668	15,187	Hodh El Gharbi
73	Sava	الصفا	N/A	N/A	13,864	15,187	Hodh El Gharbi
74	Koumbi Saleh	كمبي صالح	N/A	N/A	11,064	15,084	Hodh Ech Chargui
75	Sivane		N/A	N/A	N/A	15,020	Hodh Ech Chargui
76	Dweirara		N/A	N/A	N/A	14,542	Hodh El Gharbi
77	Feireni	الفيرني	N/A	6,427	N/A	14,526	Hodh Ech Chargui
78	Bababé	بابابى	N/A	N/A	11,507	14,513	Brakna
79	Ould Birem	ولد بيرم	N/A	9,620	N/A	14,362	Brakna
80	Bokkol	بكل	N/A	N/A	N/A	14,232	Gorgol
81	Aoueinat Zbel	عوينات الزبل	N/A	6,873	N/A	14,227	Hodh Ech Chargui
82	Baghdad		N/A	N/A	N/A	14,221	Hodh El Gharbi
83	Tikobra	تيكوبرا	N/A	N/A	N/A	14,076	Gorgol
84	Mâl	مال	N/A	20,488	23,101	14,056	Brakna
85	Aweintat I	عوينات الطل	N/A	N/A	N/A	13,705	Hodh El Gharbi
86	Bangou	بانغو	N/A	N/A	10,157	13,673	Hodh Ech Chargui
87	Tokomadji	توكومادي	N/A	N/A	N/A	13,591	Gorgol
88	Legrane	لكران	N/A	N/A	13,157	13,352	Assaba
89	Sagne	صانيي	N/A	N/A	10,820	13,322	Gorgol
90	El Ghaire	الغايرة	N/A	N/A	N/A	13,279	Assaba
91	Diadjibine Gandéga	انجاجبني الشرفه	N/A	N/A	10,597	13,142	Gorgol
92	Daghveg	دغفك	N/A	N/A	N/A	12,978	Assaba
93	Ghabou	غابو	N/A	21,700	24,467	12,912	Guidimaka
94	Boulahrath	بولحراث	N/A	N/A	N/A	12,875	Assaba
95	Mbagne	إمبن	N/A	N/A	11,859	12,719	Brakna
96	Baidiyam	باديام	N/A	N/A	N/A	12,693	Guidimaka
97	Ksar el Barka		N/A	N/A	7,037	12,678	Hodh Ech Chargui
98	N'Beiket Lahwach		N/A	N/A	N/A	12,652	Hodh Ech Chargui
99	Tektaka	التكتاكة	N/A	N/A	N/A	12,643	Guidimaka
100	Agoueinit	آكوينيت	N/A	N/A	N/A	12,410	Hodh Ech Chargui
101	Touil	الطويل	N/A	N/A	N/A	12,359	Hodh El Gharbi
102	Bagodine	باجودين	N/A	N/A	11,263	12,303	Brakna
103	El Melgua	الملقى	N/A	N/A	N/A	12,265	Assaba
104	Rdheidhi	ارظيظيع	N/A	N/A	N/A	12,248	Assaba
105	Edbaye El Hejaj	أدباي الحجاج	N/A	6,958	N/A	12,151	Brakna
106	El Mabrouk	المبروك	N/A	4,248	N/A	12,111	Hodh Ech Chargui
107	Barkeol	باركيول	N/A	N/A	N/A	12,091	Assaba
108	Lahrach	الأحرش	N/A	N/A	N/A	11,917	Gorgol
109	Boutalhaya	أبو طلحاية	N/A	10,502	N/A	11,739	Trarza
110	Sani	ساني	N/A	N/A	N/A	11,714	Assaba
111	Nere Walo	نير والو	N/A	N/A	N/A	11,653	Gorgol
112	Fderîck	افديرك	N/A	N/A	N/A	11,623	Tiris Zemmour
113	Oum Lahyad	أم الحياض	N/A	7,139	10,997	11,466	Hodh El Gharbi
114	Bouanze	بوعنز	N/A	N/A	N/A	11,457	Guidimaka
115	Soufi		N/A	N/A	N/A	11,358	Guidimaka
116	Agharghar	أقرقار	N/A	8,820	N/A	11,293	Hodh El Gharbi
117	Ganki	كانكي	N/A	N/A	N/A	11,250	Gorgol
118	Cheggar	شكار	N/A	N/A	10,437	11,205	Brakna
119	Lehreijat	الحريجات	N/A	N/A	13,915	11,172	Hodh El Gharbi
120	Guateidome	كطيدوم	N/A	N/A	N/A	10,992	Hodh El Gharbi
121	Chelkhet Tiyad	شلخة التياب	N/A	N/A	N/A	10,901	Gorgol
122	Toutel	تولل	N/A	N/A	N/A	10,857	Gorgol
123	Nteichitt	انتيشط	N/A	9,717	N/A	10,760	Trarza
124	Kamour	كامور	N/A	N/A	8,263	10,717	Assaba
125	Ould Yenge	ولد ينج	N/A	N/A	N/A	10,491	Guidimaka
126	Boubacar Ben Amer	بوبكر بن عامر	N/A	N/A	N/A	10,469	Tagant
127	Daw	داوو	N/A	N/A	N/A	10,453	Gorgol
128	Ouldmbouni	ولد امبني	N/A	N/A	7,697	10,412	Guidimaka
129	Tufunde Cive	تفوند سيفي	N/A	N/A	N/A	10,374	Gorgol
130	Aghchorguitt	أغشوركيت	N/A	N/A	10,156	10,328	Brakna
131	Lehraj		N/A	N/A	N/A	10,324	Guidimaka
	Nbeika	نبيكا	N/A	18,310	20,645	N/A	Tagant

== Other settlements ==
- Akreijit (أكريجيت)
- Bir Moghrein (بير مغرين)
- Chinguetti (شنقيط)
- Choum (شوم)
- Ouadane (وادان)
- Oualata (ولاتة)
- Tichit (تيشيت)

== See also ==
- List of metropolitan areas in Africa
- List of largest cities in the Arab world
