= Ten Hamadi =

Ten Hamadi تن حمادي Tenhamad
- Commune and village
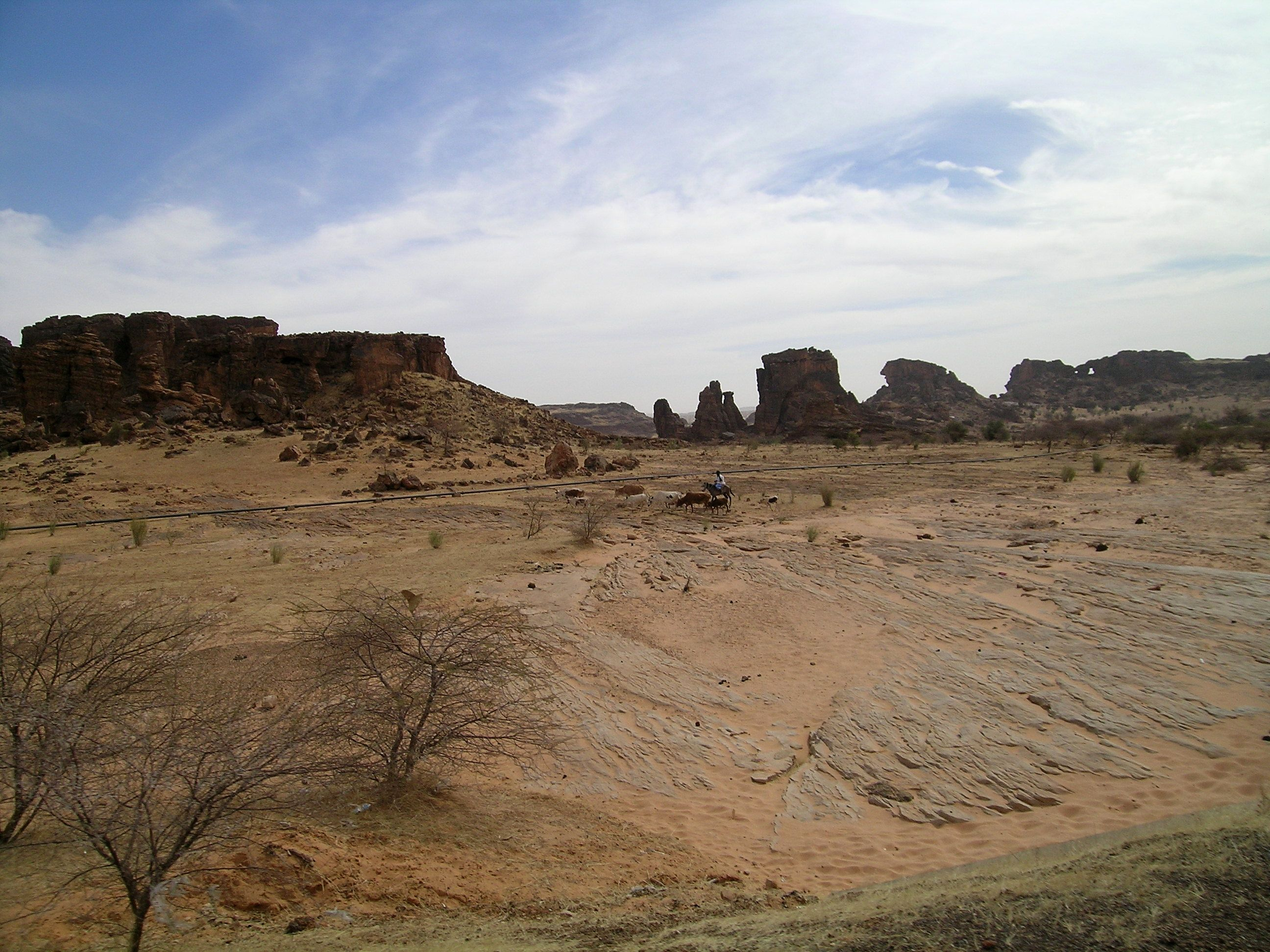
- Landscape to the northeast of Ten Hamadi, near Aïoun El Atrouss

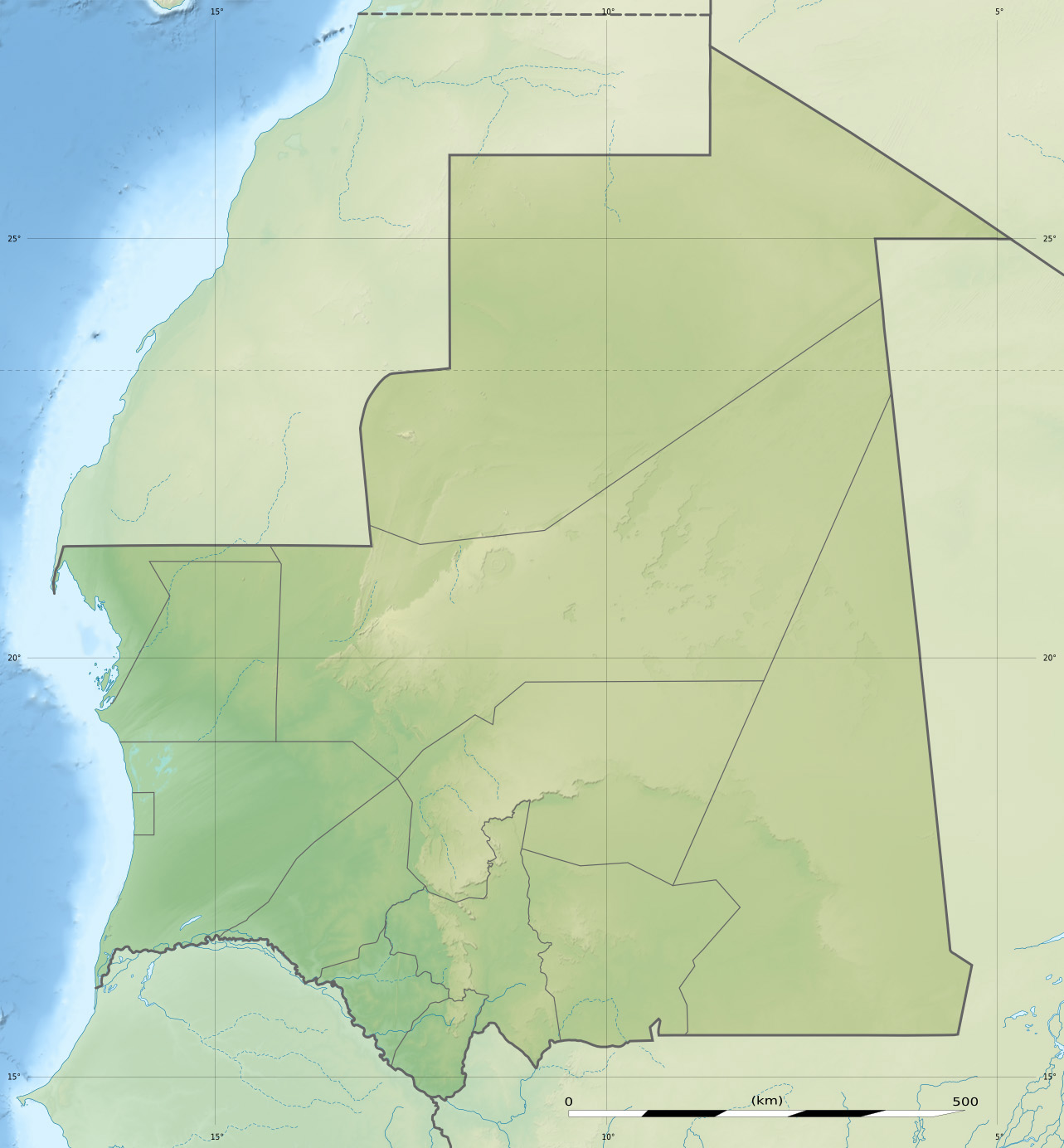
- Location in Mauritania
- Coordinates: 16°32′1″N 9°41′51″W
- Country: Mauritania
- Region: Hodh El Gharbi
- Department: Aïoun El Atrouss

Population (2000)
  - Commune and village: 2,264
  - Metro: 155 (village)
- Time zone: UTC+0 (GMT)

Ten Hamadi (Arabic: تن حمادي) or Tenhemad is a village and rural commune in southern Mauritania, in the Aïoun El Atrouss department of the Hodh El Gharbi region. In 2000, the commune had a population of 2,264, of which 155 lived in the village of Ten Hamadi itself, approximately 17 kilometres (11 mi) southwest of the main town and departmental capital of Aïoun El Atrouss. The population estimate in 2007 was 3,686, spread over 16 villages.

The northern part of the commune is hilly but relatively favorable to agriculture, while the southern part is flat and characterized by sand dunes. Situated at the southern boundary of the Sahara-Sahel region of southern Mauritania, the climate is generally hot and dry.

Most of the population live in poverty, occupied in farming or raising livestock. Some have moved to the cities to seek a higher standard of living, returning to help during the peak periods of agricultural activity. Infrastructure is underdeveloped; there is no electricity supply, most water comes from traditional wells, and the rudimentary school system provides only elementary education in poorly equipped establishments.

== History ==
Settlement of the commune began with the establishment of the village of El Emn in 1960, followed by the main village of Ten Hamadi in 1962. El Bakhakh was established in 1972, and is one of the fastest-growing settlements in the commune. Its population more than doubled between 2000 and 2007, from 111 to an estimated 230, making it more populous than the main village of Ten Hamadi. Egueni Ehl Ahmed Zein, established in 1980, on the other hand, has declined in population by more than 75 percent, with a population of 1,252 in 2000 to an estimated 284 in 2007. In 2007, nearby Aïoun El Atrouss was one of the stops on the 2007 Dakar Rally.

== Geography and climate ==
Ten Hamadi is situated at the southern boundary of the Sahara-Sahel region of southern Mauritania. By air it is located approximately 17 kilometres (11 mi) southwest of the departmental capital of Aioun El Atrouss, and the main village of Ten Hamadi is accessed via a dirt trail leading south off National Route 3, which connects it to this town and to the town of Tintane to the west. The commune is bordered to the north by the village and rural commune of Doueirara, to the north-east by the town and urban commune of Aioun El Atrouss, to the east by the village and rural commune of Beneamane, to the south by the village and rural commune of Hassi Ehel Bechna Ahmed, and to the west by the village and rural commune of Hassi Abdallah.

The northern part of the commune is hilly but relatively favorable to agriculture, while the southern part is flat and characterized by sand dunes. Sixteen caves are found within the area. The earth is mainly composed of stony rocks, sandy loam soils, and clay loam soils in the beds of wadis in the area. The soils in the hills have pockets of alluvium and sandy loam suitable for crop development, particularly on the hillsides and at the foot of the hills. Clay loam soils are found in the bowls and beds of wadis, which although suitable for farming are susceptible to gully and water erosion during the rainy season. The aquifers of shallow wells with depths varying from 25–50 metres (82–164 ft), yielding little more than 2 cubic metres/hour (71 cu ft), vary widely in availability. Deeper aquifers offer larger quantities of water, but its quality is generally brackish. The wadis are generally dry, usually only inundated after rainfall.

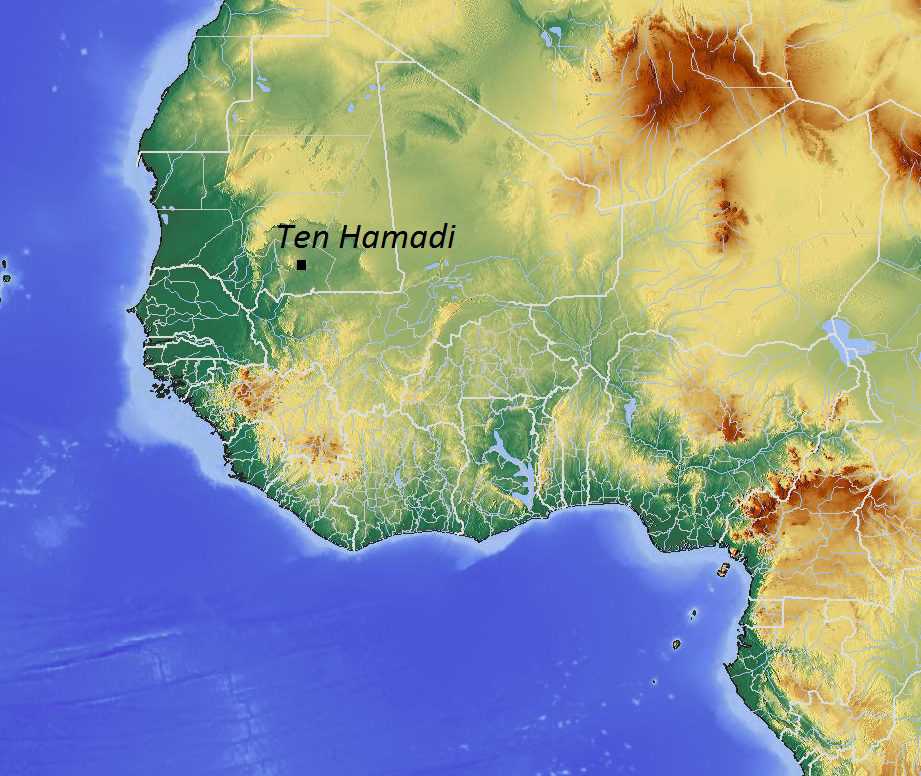
Relief map showing location in western Africa

Vegetation is typical of the Sahara-Sahel region, and is mainly desert with thorny steppe land. Soil erosion is a problem, as many previously wooded areas have disappeared as the locals use wood for fuel, and inadequate farming practices have sometimes resulted in soil exhaustion.

Ten Hamadi has three main climatic seasons. The wet season from July to October has temperatures of the order of 30–40 °C (86–104 °F) and irregular rainfall. The dry and cold season in November to February has temperatures that can fall below 20 °C (68 °F) during the night. During the hot and dry season from March to June temperatures reach 40–45 °C (104–113 °F) during the day.

=== Villages ===
In 2007, there were 16 villages in the commune according to the Mauritanian government, with a total estimated population of 3,686.

Village	Pop. 2000 census	Pop. 2007 est.	Established
Ten Hamadi	155	140	1962
Archan	–	76	1978
Bagzaze	170	349	1981
Dimechk	–	242	1982
Egueni Ehl Ahmed Zein	1,252	284	1980
Egueni El Barka	231	331	1979
Hasy Ehl Sidi Meni	38	153	1971
El Bakhakh	111	230	1972
Basra	–	46	1980
El Bathe	116	283	1981
Kligue Smalil	–	801	1972
El Emn	74	183	1960
Touve	–	68	1975
Bedr 1	90	90	2000
Bedr 3	–	80	2000
Ehl Mahmoud	0	30	1997

== Demography and religion ==
In 2000, the commune had a population of 2,264 people, with 155 people in the village of Ten Hamadi itself. In 2007, the commune had 3,686 inhabitants in about 791 households. The population is generally young, and more than 53 percent are female. Most people belong to the Tenwajiw tribe, although small numbers belong to the Oulad Nasser, Smalil and Leglal tribes. Most live in the north and east of the commune owing to greater availability of water and land that can be used for crops or grazing. More than half the population live below the poverty line. There is seasonal migration from the commune to the cities of Aïoun and Nouakchott in the dry season, then back to the commune in the winter season, when many people return to help their families with tilling and planting. Like the rest of Mauritania, Islam is the primary religion, which according to the Central Intelligence Agency has a 100 percent following in the country.

== Economy ==
The economy is mostly based on agriculture and raising livestock, with some commerce and artisan activity. There are some dams and ditches to support irrigation, but they are in a poor condition. In 2007, there were 361 farmers, most of whom relied on irrigation to some extent, nine grain banks and one grain mill. There were 311 sedentary stock owners, 115 semi-migratory and 65 practicing large-scale migration, mostly to Mali. An estimate of herd sizes gave 10,340 goats, 8,870 cattle, 1,361 camels, 652 donkeys and a few horses and sheep. There were 63 full-time retailers and 143 people practicing trade to some extent. There were 45 full-time artisans and 65 part-time craftspeople. Activities included masonry, transport by cart, butchering, bakery and woodworking.

== Education ==
In 2001, the commune had eight primary schools with 19 teachers for 595 children. There were 20 mahadras, or traditional schools, in 11 locations. Only four had a library or document repository. There were 11 writing rooms of varying quality, and one small vocational training centre. By 2007, the commune had 11 primary schools with 689 students (45 percent of whom were girls) and 28 teachers, but no secondary school. Only three schools had desks. All had latrines, but not all had drinking water or facilities for preparing meals for the children. The quality of education was mixed.

== Public services ==
Until fairly recently, Ten Hamadi had no mains power supply, no radio communication, and no fixed telephone lines, but most areas now have mobile coverage from at least one of the three local operators: Mauritel, MATTEL and Chinguitel. Fewer than a third of families have a latrine. In 2001, there was one health centre in the village of Ten Hamadi, built of cement with a corrugated roof and with six rooms. A pharmacy was operated on a cost-recovery basis. By 2007, there were two health posts in the commune, each staffed by one nurse, but there were no midwives. The health posts had no running water, electricity or latrines, and were not equipped with radio or ambulances, although the post at Ten Hamadi village did have a refrigerator and a pharmacy.

The commune has six wells with pumps supplying 221 connections, 15 modern wells and 61 traditional wells. The water tends to become salty towards the end of the dry season. The main village of the commune relies on two traditional wells. The "Route de l’Espoir" (Road of Hope) crosses the commune, providing good access to several villages. The commune has several permanent tracks, but some villages are difficult to access, particularly in winter. About 20 percent of the dwellings are concrete; the others are shacks or, in a few cases, tents.
