= Ba Mamadou Mbaré =

Mauritanian politician

President of Mauritania Acting
- In office 15 April 2009 – 5 August 2009
- Prime Minister: Moulaye Ould Mohamed Laghdaf
- Preceded by: Mohamed Ould Abdel Aziz (as President of the High Council of State)
- Succeeded by: Mohamed Ould Abdel Aziz

President of the Senate
- In office April 2006 – 10 January 2013
- Preceded by: Dieng Boubou Farba
- Succeeded by: Mohamed El Hacen Ould El Hadj

Personal details
- Born: 1946 Waly Diantang, Mauritania
- Died: 10 January 2013 (aged 66–67) Paris, France
- Party: Independent
- Other political affiliations: Union for the Republic

Ba Mamadou dit Mbaré (1946 – 10 January 2013) was a Mauritanian politician who served as President of the Senate of Mauritania from 2006 until his death. As President of the Senate, he succeeded Mohamed Ould Abdel Aziz as Head of State on 15 April 2009, when Abdel Aziz resigned to take part in the June 2009 presidential election. Abdel Aziz was then elected president and in turn succeeded Mbaré on 5 August 2009.

== Early life and political career ==
Mbaré was born in 1946 in Waly Diantang, Gorgol Region, a village in southwest Mauritania, on the border with Senegal. After receiving his primary and secondary education in Mauritania, he studied in the Soviet Union at the Academy of Agricultural Sciences of Ukraine, located in Kiev, from 1967 to 1973, and he earned a degree in veterinary medicine. Back in Mauritania, he was a researcher at the Laboratory of Fisheries from 1974 to 1975, then head of the Laboratory of Fisheries in Nouadhibou and head of the department of oceanography and marine biology from 1976 to 1978. Subsequently, he was Director of the National Center of Oceanographic and Fishing Research from 1978 to 1980.

Mbaré was Technical Adviser to the Minister of Fishing and the Maritime Economy from 1980 to 1981; later, he was Mayor of Wali Commune from 1986 to 2003. He also worked as a functionary at the Ministry of Fishing and the Maritime Economy during his time as Mayor of Wali, until he was appointed as Director-General of the Autonomous Port of Nouadhibou in 2002; he held the latter position until 2003. He was an opponent of President Maaouya Ould Sid'Ahmed Taya, although he served in the government under Taya as Minister of Fishing and the Maritime Economy from 13 November 2003 until Taya was overthrown in an August 2005 military coup.

Mbaré was elected to the Senate, representing Maghama, in the January–February 2007 Senate election; following that election, he was elected as President of the Senate on 26 April 2007. 40 Senators voted for Mbaré, while 11 voted for Ahmed Salem Ould Bakar, a Senator from Boutilimit.

== Presidency ==
Mohamed Ould Abdel Aziz seized power in a 6 August 2008 coup d'état that deposed President Sidi Ould Cheikh Abdallahi. Abdel Aziz resigned from all political and military positions on 15 April 2009 so that he could stand as a candidate in the July 2009 presidential election, required by a constitutional regulation. Mbaré succeeded Abdel Aziz as head of state in an interim capacity, becoming the first black leader of Mauritania.

Abdel Aziz won the election and was sworn in on 5 August 2009, succeeding Mbaré as president.

Political offices
Preceded by Mohamed Ould Abdel Aziz as President of the High Council of State	President of Mauritania; Acting; 2009	Succeeded by Mohamed Ould Abdel Aziz
