= Timzine =

- Commune and town
- Location in Mauritania
- Coordinates: 16°18′28″N 9°9′10″W
- Country: Mauritania
- Region: Hodh El Gharbi
- Department: Kobenni

Population (2023)
  - Total: 19,123
- Time zone: UTC±00:00 (GMT)

Timzine (Arabic: تمزين) is a small town and commune in the Kobenni Department of the Hodh El Gharbi region of southeastern Mauritania. As of 2023, it had a population of 19,123 people.

The commune, created in 1988, has an agro-pastoral economy, and is a producer of black sorghum.

== History and politics ==
The rural commune of Timzine was created by Decree No. 88.1709 on December 6, 1988.

In September 2018, Timzine held municipal elections. The Parti Union pour la République (UPR) won about 58.7% of the votes while the National Democratic Alliance (AND) won about 40.25%. The number of registered voters in Timzine was 7,106 and there was an 81.35% turnout.

== Geography ==
Timzine lies between the towns of Tintane and Timbédra, about 64 kilometres (40 mi) by air southeast of Ten Hamadi, and 20 kilometres (12 mi) northeast of the department capital town of Kobenni.

The commune covers an area of 1,871 square kilometres (722 sq mi), and contains villages such as Agreij Lrehjar, Rezame and Nematoullah.

== Demographics ==
As of 2023, the commune of Timzine had a population of 19,123 people.

== Economy ==
The area is agro-pastoral, and is a producer of black sorghum.

In 2014, the mayor of the commune launched an appeal to the authorities in Kobenni to improve water supply facilities in Timzine, after serious problems with thirst.

== Landmarks ==
The town is served by Timzine Health Centre. In November 2017, Tadamoun (an agency of Mauritania for poverty alleviation) inaugurated a new school with 8 classrooms and a yard for sports in the commune.
