= Gorgol =

Gorgol may refer to:

- Gorgol Region, Mauritania
- Gorgol River, Mauritania
