= Foum Gleita Dam =

Dam in Mauritania

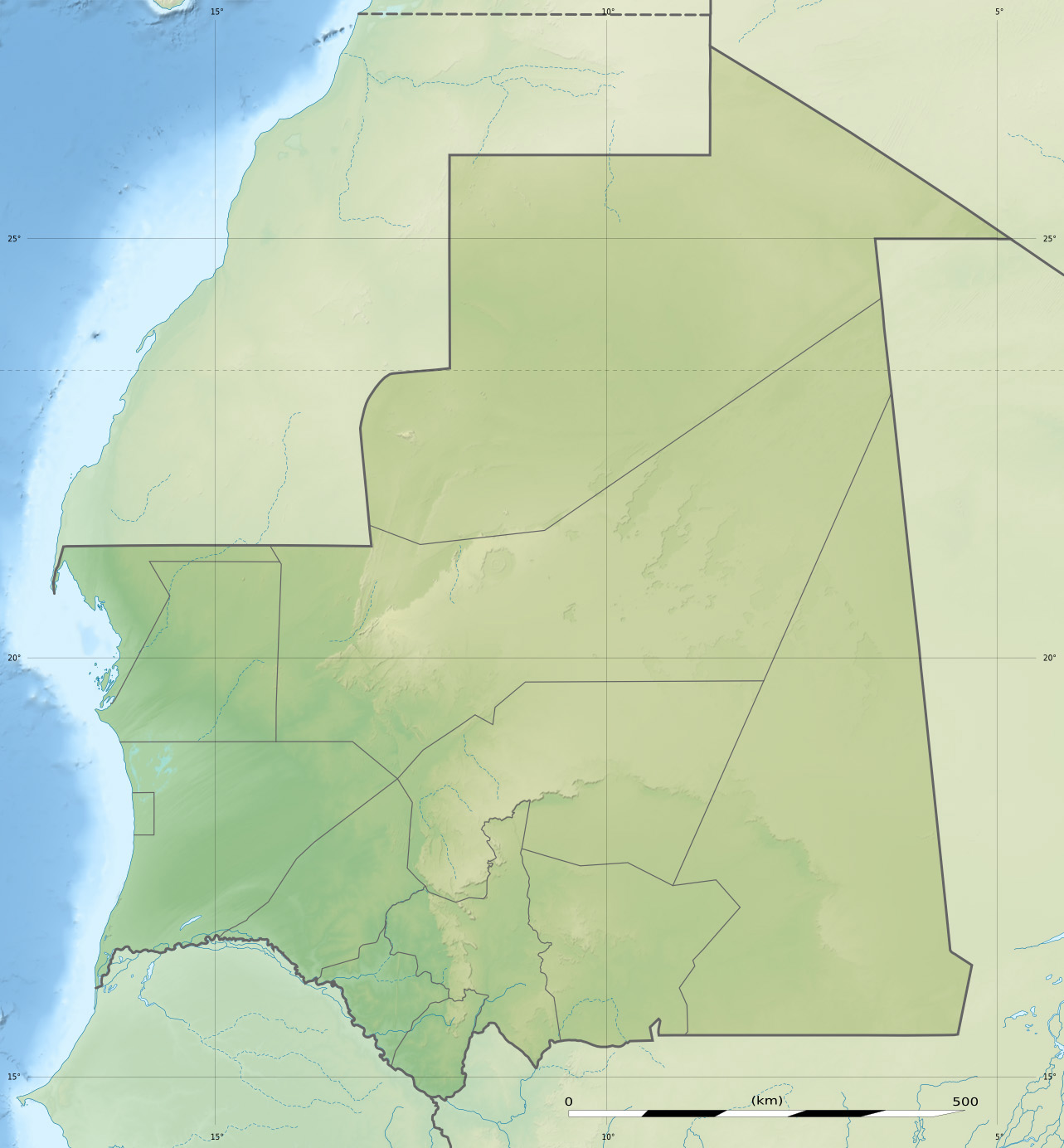
- Location within Mauritania
- Country: Mauritania
- Location: Foum Gleita
- Coordinates: 16°09′27.18″N 12°39′55.41″W
- Purpose: Irrigation
- Status: Operational
- Opening date: 1988; 38 years ago

Dam and spillways
- Type of dam: Arch
- Impounds: Gorgol River
- Height: 38 m (125 ft)

Reservoir
- Total capacity: 500,000,000 m^{3} (410,000 acre⋅ft)

The Foum Gleita Dam is an arch dam on the Gorgol River near Foum Gleita in the Gorgol Region of Mauritania. The dam was completed in 1988 with the primary purpose of supplying water for the irrigation of up to 4,000 ha (9,900 acres) of crops.

An assessment of the dam's stability, taken out in the year 2004, revealed 19 stability and safety issues, mainly due to deferred maintenance. However, the main dam structure was in a stable condition at that time.
