= Kobenni (department) =

Kobenni كوبني
- Department
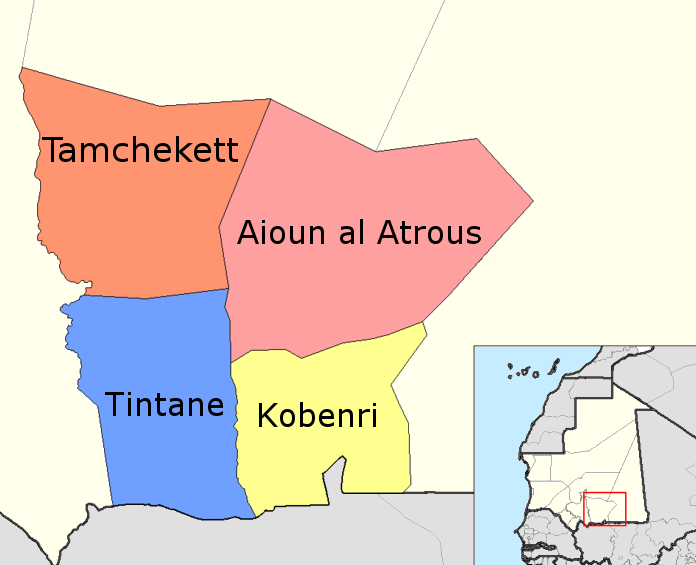

- Location within Mauritania
- Country: Mauritania

Area
  - Total: 8,924 km^{2} (3,446 sq mi)

Population (2023 census)
  - Total: 135,158
  - Density: 15.15/km^{2} (39.23/sq mi)

Kobenni is a department of Hodh El Gharbi Region in Mauritania.

Subsistence farming and livestock rearing are the main economic activities in the Kobenni Department. Kobenni's population comprises various ethnic groups, including Moors (Arab-Berber), Fulani (Pular), Soninke, Bambara, and Tuareg communities. Approximately 49% of the department's inhabitants live below the poverty line, defined as earning less than $1.90 per day. Plasmodium falciparum malaria is endemic to the Kobenni department.

== List of municipalities in the department ==
The Kobenni department is made up of following communes:

- Gogui
- Hassi Ehel Ahmed Bechna
- Kobenni
- Leghligue
- Modibougou
- Timzinn
- Voulaniya
