= Radhi, Mauritania =

Radhi
- Commune and village
- Interactive map of Radhi
- Coordinates: 16°48.8197′N 10°16.9693′W
- Country: Mauritania

Population (2023 census)
  - Total: 9,731
- Time zone: UTC±00:00 (GMT)

Radhi is a rural commune in the department of Tamchekket in the region of Hodh El Gharbi in Mauritania. The commune's water resources support the cultivation of dates, as well as habitat for migratory birds on the East Atlantic Flyway. A solar power station and street lights were installed in Radhi in 2024.

== Subdivisions of Radhi commune ==
| Subdivision | Pop. (2000 census) |
|---|---|
| Radhi | 915 |
| Barbare 1 | 143 |
| Barbare 2 | 144 |
| Bougherdhe | 255 |
| Dkhailat Ehel Khouwar | 81 |
| Edebay Legleite | 21 |
| Edebay Mahmoud | 26 |
| Eguerj Elkheir | 218 |
| Eguerj Haite | 180 |
| Elbeyidh | 300 |
| Elkettane | 109 |
| Elmouna | 42 |
| Elwaste | 365 |
| Elwaste Ehel Val | 52 |
| Eyyer | 28 |
| Galb el Hawliye | 240 |
| Ghligue Elghedhef | 386 |
| Neichane | 490 |
| Ntourje | 411 |
| Reyoug Baghdad | 154 |
| Reyoug 1 | 341 |
| Reyoug 2 | 406 |
| Rkhaimiye | 251 |
| Sayade | 179 |
| Sbagha | 239 |
| Tichouten | 73 |
| Yewli | 265 |
| Zouleikhe Elwasta | 47 |
| Zouleikhe 1 | 46 |
| Zouleikhe 2 | 174 |
