= Tintane (department) =

- Department
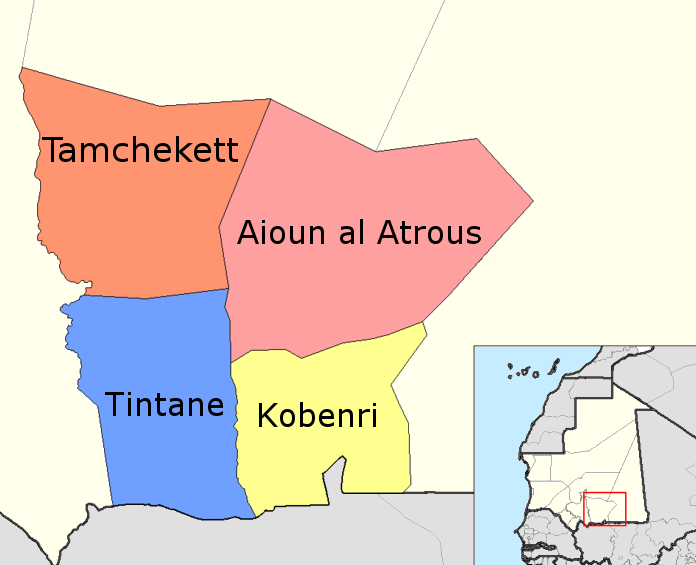
- The location of Tintane department (bottom left) in Hodh El Gharbi Region, Mauritania

- Location within Mauritania
- Country: Mauritania

Area
  - Total: 10,090 km^{2} (3,900 sq mi)

Population (2013 census)
  - Total: 97,169
  - Density: 9.630/km^{2} (24.94/sq mi)

Tintane is a department of Hodh El Gharbi Region in Mauritania.

== List of municipalities in the department ==
The Tintane department is made up of following communes:

- Agharghar
- Ain Varba
- Aweintat I
- Devaa
- Hassi Abdallah
- Lehreijat
- Tintane
