= Kobeni =

Kobeni may refer to:

- Kobenni or Kobeni, a town in southern Mauritania
- Kobeni Higashiyama (東山 コベニ), a fictional character in the Chainsaw Man manga series
