= El Aioun, Mauritania =

El Aioun العيون
- Commune and town
- Location in Mauritania
- Coordinates: 15°33′0″N 11°11′2″W
- Country: Mauritania
- Region: Assaba
- Department: Kankossa

Government
  - Mayor: Bah O/ Sid’Ahmed (PRDS)

Population (2013 census)
  - Commune and town: 22,796
  - Metro: 65,237
- Time zone: UTC+0 (GMT)

Aioun or El Aioun is a town and commune in the Assaba Region of southern Mauritania near the border with Mali.

It has a population of 22,796.
