= Gogui, Mauritania =

Gogui Arabic: كوكي
- Commune and village
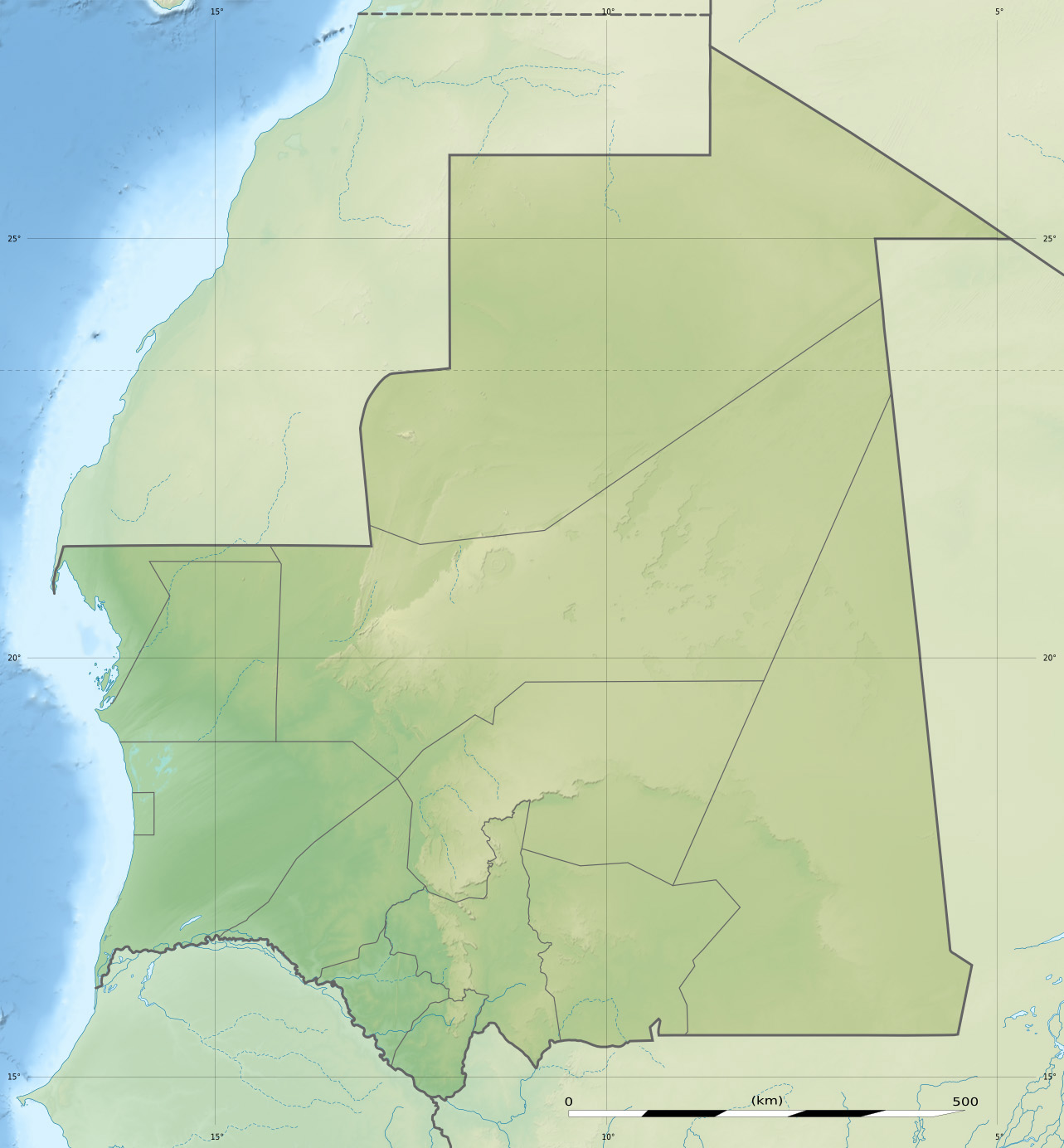
- Location in Mauritania
- Coordinates: 15.7034720°N 9.3103358°W
- Country: Mauritania
- Region: Hodh El Gharbi Region

Population (2023)
  - Total: 20,553
- Time zone: UTC±00:00 (GMT)

Gogui (Arabic: كوكي) or Gogui Zammal, Kouki Zemal, etc. (Note: Transliteration of the Arabic name كوكي الزمال into Latin script is erratic. Google Maps shows the name as "Gogui Zammal", while Google Translate renders it as Koki Zemal, Kouki Zamal or Kouki Zemal, depending on context.) (Arabic: كوكي الزمال) is a village and rural commune in the Hodh El Gharbi Region of Mauritania. It contains the main border crossing between Mauritania and Mali, and is the point from which Mauritania sends illegal migrants back to Mali. The crossing is normally busy 24 hours a day, since it is the main point of entry for foreign goods into Mali, but has been closed during periods of tension between the two countries.

== Location ==
Gogui, Mauritania, is on the southern border of Mauritania near the town of Gogui, Mali. The Mali highway RN3 passes through Gogui, Mali, crosses the border into Mauritania, and runs north past Gogui, Mauritania to Ayoun el Atrous, where it joins the Mauritanian RN3 highway. It is in the region where the Sahel gradually transitions into savanna.

== Crater ==
Satellite imaging shows a crater in Gogui, Mauritania, which could be very recent based on its fairly pristine appearance. It is about 500 to 600 metres (1,600 to 2,000 ft) wide, with a circular rim and what appears to be a flat bottom. There may be ejecta around the crater, but the imaging resolution is not enough to confirm this. The crater is in a bedrock of Paleozoic metamorphic rocks.

== Border crossing ==
As of 2008 Mauritania was expelling migrants from third countries attempting to travel toward Spain. All migrants from Mali, or supposed to have entered from Mali, were sent over the border to Gogui, Mali.

As of 2013 a border post had recently been built in Gogui, Mauritania. An International Organization for Migration (IOM) project was to refurbish the corresponding post in Gogui, Mali, provide equipment to electronically register the flow of migrants across the border, have trainers from the Mauritanian border police provide training to Malian and Mauritanian border management officials, and train joint patrols of the border.

In February 2017 a Mauritanian customs unit seized two cars that were stopped at the Koki Zemal border crossing. The law prohibits import of old cars. The authorities said they have been campaigning for months against smuggling in the border area.

In February 2017 a bus coming into Hodh El Gharbi from Kouki Zemal was stopped and the passengers questioned by the gendarmerie. Only four were Mauritanians, and the rest were Malians. The passengers confirmed that at the border the police had taken a bribe of 3,000 ouguiya and the gendarmerie had demanded 2,000 ouguiya. An investigation into corruption was launched, with senior officials and officers at the Kouki Zemal border point questioned, as well as transport companies and currency exchange dealers.

In June 2018 the IOM organized a simulation at Gogui of a crisis where there was a mass displacement of population from Mauritania to Mali. There were over 300 participants, including local residents, local authorities and security forces. The exercise showed the need to balance concerns such as maintaining state security, helping vulnerable people and protecting human rights.

In August 2019 the Population Registry Agency moved to a new building in Koki Al-Zamal. The center issues visas and registers both citizens and foreigners who enter and leave the crossing. It cooperates with the police team at the crossing.

In April 2020 there was a violent dispute between residents of the Mali and Mauritania Koki Al-Zamal border villages. The border had been closed for over a week as part of an effort to prevent the spread of COVID-19. The dispute was over the boundaries of a piece of land near the border. Security forces from both countries had to intervene to restore the peace.

Early in 2024 armed Malian forces accompanied by Russian Wagner Group forces using cars and motorcycles reached villages in the Fassala border commune in Mauritania. In April 2024 the Kouki Zamal crossing was closed on both sides. Before this, the crossing was known for constant movement of trucks and buses throughout the day and night. Mali relies on the crossing to import many goods via the port of Nouakchott.

In June 2024 Mohamed Ould Cheikh El Ghazouani said at a campaign rally in Laayoune that if he was elected for a second term he would build a land port in Kouki Zemal surrounded by a commercial zone, which would benefit the economy of the Hodh El Gharbi state.

== Sources ==
- "الجمارك الموريتانية تحتجز سيارات على الحدود مع مالي", Al Akhbar (in Arabic), 2 February 2017
- "وكالة سجل السكان تفتتح مقرها الجديد في معبر كوكي الزمال", essahraa (in Arabic), 10 August 2019
- "خلافات و مناوشات قوية بين سكان كوكي الزمال الموريتاني و المالى صور", Tilmass (in Arabic), 2020-04-02
- "بين محادثات ومراسلات بين قائدي البلدين...إغلاق الحدود بين موريتانيا ومالي", nawafedh (in Arabic), 2024-04-17
- "اكتمال التحقيق مع الشرطة والدرك بالحوض الغربي", Al Akhbar (in Arabic), 8 March 2017
- A. P. Rossi (2002), "Seven possible new impact structures in Western Africa detected on ASTER imagery" (PDF), Lunar and Planetary Science, XXXIII: 1309, Bibcode:2002LPI....33.1309R
- Enhancing joint border management between Mali and Mauritania, IOM
- IOM Organizes Crisis Simulation at Mali-Mauritania Border, IOM, 3 July 2018
- Mauritania 4/5, Nouakchott to Gogui (in Spanish), 16 October 2019
- Mauritania: "Nobody wants to have anything to do with us" Arrests and collective expulsions of migrants denied entry into Europe" (PDF), Amnesty International, 1 July 2008
- "Node: Gogui (7527327692)", OpenStreetMap, 6 February 2021
- Shamad, Mohamed (17 June 2024), "غزواني: سنعمل على إنشاء ميناء على اليابسة في "كوكي"", Sahara Media (in Arabic)
