= Hmeida Ould Ahmed Taleb =

Mauritanian politician (born 1968)

Hemida Ould Ahmed Taleb (born in 1968) was a Mauritanian political figure, he was the Minister of Higher Education and Scientific Research of Mauritania between July 2008 and August 2008.

Ould Ahmed Taleb was born in Tintane. He became First Secretary to the Mauritanian Embassy in Libya in 2000 before becoming First Secretary to the Mauritanian Embassy in Egypt in 2001.

In 2007 he became First Secretary and Chargé d'affaires of the Mauritanian Embassy in Egypt. Ould Ahmed Taleb was appointed as Minister of Higher Education and Scientific Research in July 2008, function he occupied until August 2008, when a military coup overthrew the Government in Mauritania.
