= Edebaye Ehl Guelay =

- Commune and village
- Interactive map of Edebaye Ehl Guelay
- Coordinates: 15.7563°N 12.6718°W
- Country: Mauritania
- Region: Gorgol
- Department: M'Bout (department)

Population (2023)
  - Total: 13,735
- Time zone: UTC±00:00 (GMT)

Edebaye Ehl Guelay is a village and rural commune in Mauritania.
