= Maghama (department) =

- Department
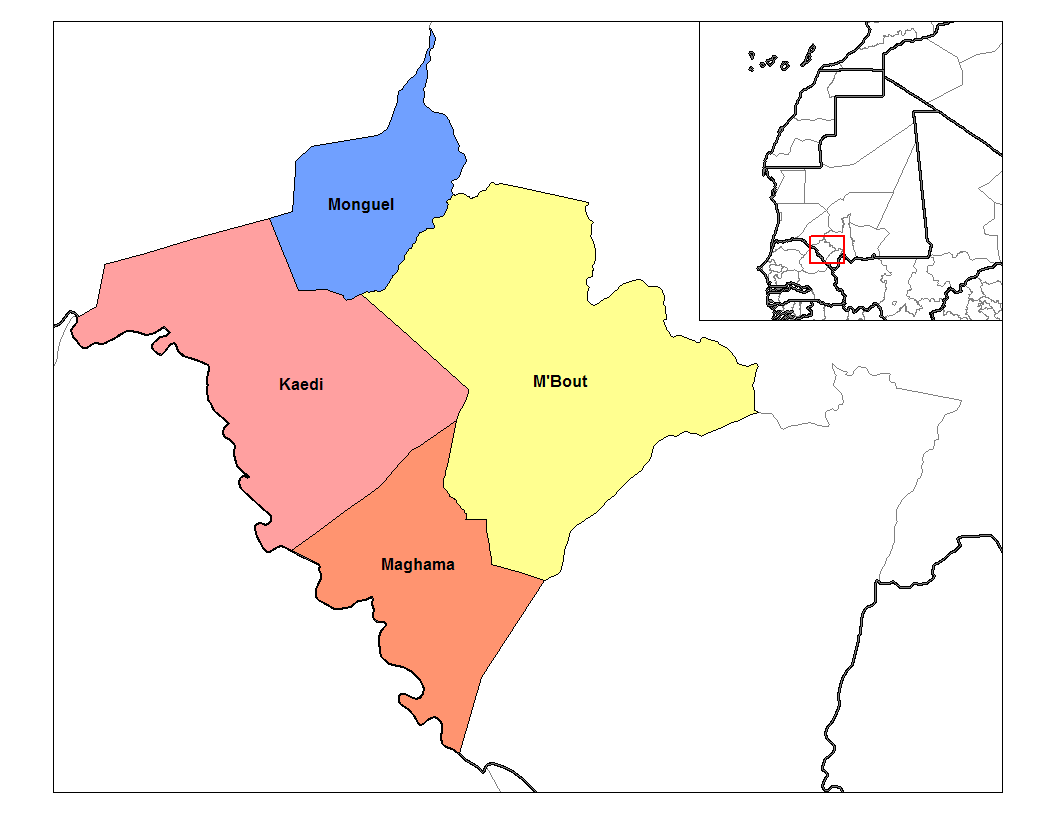

- Location within Mauritania
- Country: Mauritania

Area
  - Total: 2,321 km^{2} (896 sq mi)

Population (2013 census)
  - Total: 68,465
  - Density: 29.50/km^{2} (76.40/sq mi)

Maghama is a department of Gorgol Region in Mauritania.

== List of municipalities in the department ==
The Maghama department is made up of following municipalities:

- Beileguet Litama
- Daw
- Dolol Cive
- Maghama
- Sagne
- Toutel
- Vrea Litama
- Bedinky
- Waly Diantang.

In 2013, the entire population of the Maghama Department has a total of 68,465 inhabitants (33,576 men and 34,889 women).
