= Foum Gleita =

- Commune and town
- Foum Gleita Dam

- Location in Mauritania
- Country: Mauritania
- Region: Gorgol
- Department: M'Bout (department)

Area
  - Total: 327.0 sq mi (847.0 km^{2})

Population (2023 census)
  - Total: 33,314
  - Density: 101.9/sq mi (39.33/km^{2})
- Time zone: UTC±00:00 (GMT)

Foum Gleita is a town and commune in Mauritania along the Gorgol River. The Foum Gleita Dam is located there.

In 2013, it had a population of 22,531. In 2023, it had a population of 33,314.
