= Lehreijat =

- Commune and village
- Country: Mauritania
- Region: Hodh El Gharbi
- Department: Tintane

Population (2023)
  - Total: 11,172
- Time zone: UTC±00:00 (GMT)

Lehreijat is a village and rural commune in the Tintane department of Mauritania. In the 2013 census, it had a population of 13, 915. In the 2023 census, it had a population of 11,172.
