= Sagne =

Sagne may refer to:

- La Sagne - Switzerland
- Sagne, Mauritania
