= Waly Diantang, Mauritania =

Waly Diantang Wali Wali
- Commune de waly Diantang
- Waly
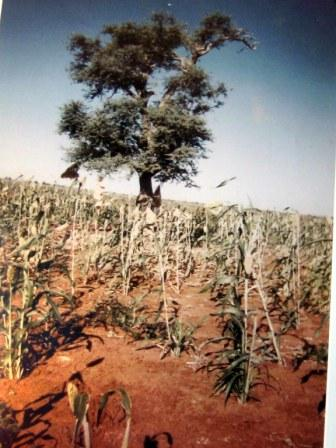
- Samé walo -- sorghum planted on flooded land in "Gesse Tessekel"
- Nickname: Wali
- Location in Mauritania
- Coordinates: 15°20′N 12°52′W
- Country: Mauritania
- Region: Gorgol
- Department: Maghama

Government
  - Mayor: Oumar Gorbal Sy

Population (2023)
  - Total: 15,977
  - Ethnicities: Fula
- Time zone: UTC+0 (GMT)

Waly Diantang is a village and rural commune in the Gorgol Region in southern Mauritania, near the Senegal River. It is also spelled Wali Diantang and is often referred to as just Waly (or Wali). Waly Diantang was the legendary founder of the town.

It is a medium size town where the people speak Fula. The economy is based on wetland sorghum cultivation (samé walo).

The people used to fish in the river called the Mayel, but now it is dry. Kolongal Walo is the agricultural area near the Mayel River. In addition, Oumar Bocar Camara from Wali Diantang remembers these Mayel River shores (river access points):

Tufnde Mayel, Tufnde Gambol, Tufnde Kone, Tufnde Toulel, Tufnde Lassimayel (river end)

These are places where the Walian, Toulelian, Sinthiane Padalal, Bedinkian, Barkewi, and the Barkatou people would catch fish. They would use mbakaledje, doligngadji, diawly, and dingues, which are types of fish trap and other equipment for catching fish.

== Notable residents ==
- Ba Mamadou Mbaré - First black President of Mauritania.
- Fatimata Dembélé - Mother of Ousmane Dembélé.

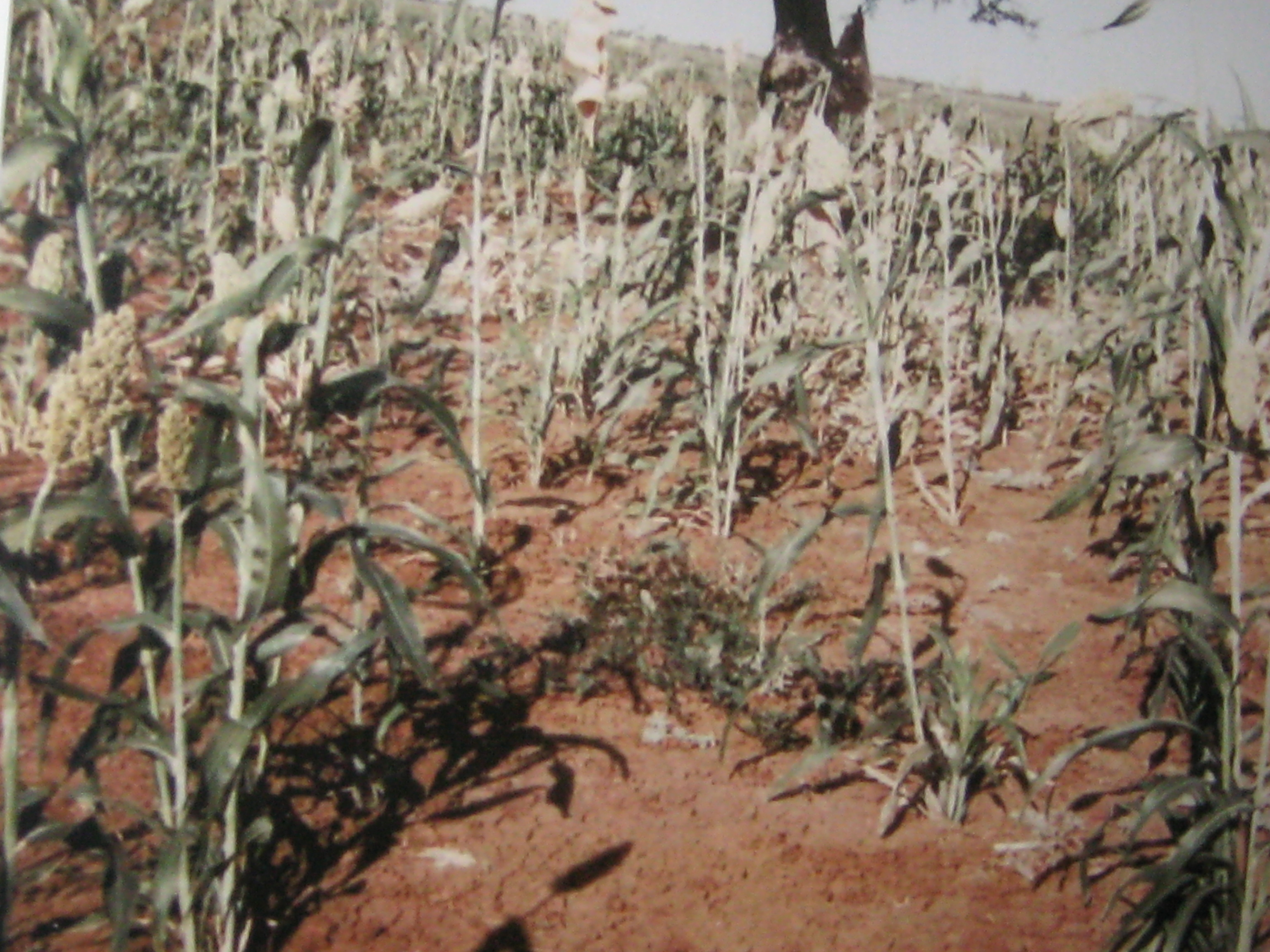
This is the "Kolongal Jaaw" (Jaaw floodplain) which is an agricultural area.
