= Huvrat ehl Sheikh =

Hovratt ehl Cheikh حفرة أهل الشيخ
- Commune and village
- Location in Mauritania
- Coordinates: 16°49′N 11°45′W
- Country: Mauritania
- Region: Assaba Region
- Established: 1984

Population
  - Total: 500
- Area code: +222

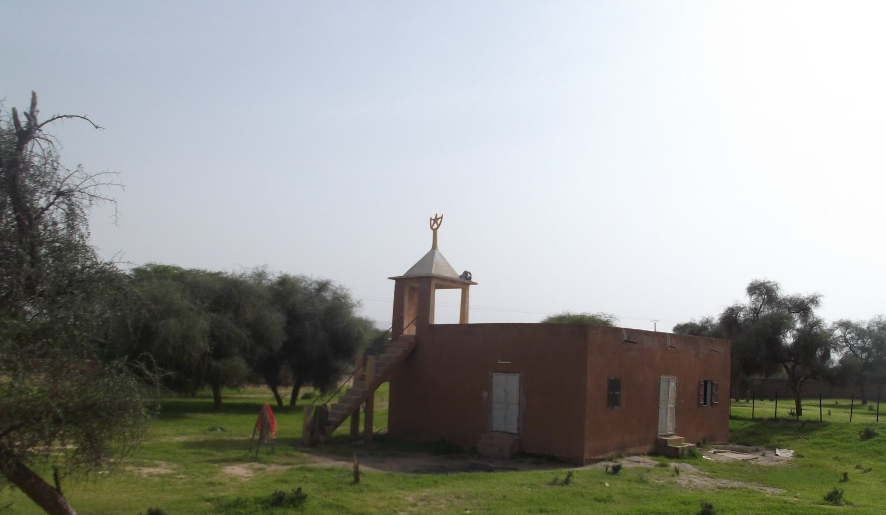
A snapshot of a mosque afternoon

Hovratt ehl Cheikh Sid'Elemine is a village and commune in Mauritania.

Hovratt ehl Cheikh Sid'Elemine nearest to Kiffa capital of Assaba Region. It is located at around 16°49′N 11°45′W. According to the official census, the city's population was 500 in 2005

The village was founded at the end of the nineteenth century and early twentieth century, and then witnessed displacement of population in the first half of the twentieth century. It was reborn late in 1984 by initiative of Hassan Ould Bou, a businessman from the village, with a number of notable people of Sheikh Elemine tribe. The mosque and minaret, the first foundations of the village were built in early 1986.
