= Tenaha =

Tenaha may refer to:

- Tenaha, Texas
- Tenaha, Mauritania
