= Kaedi (department) =

Kaedi كيهيدي
- Department
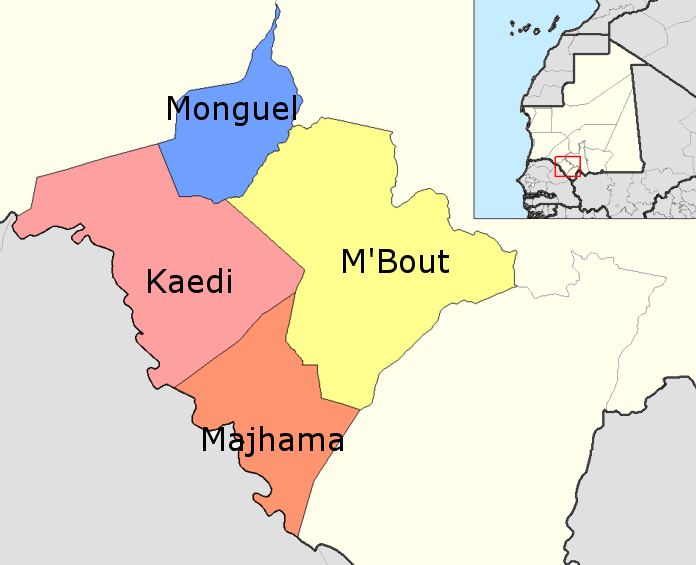

- Location within Mauritania
- Country: Mauritania

Area
  - Total: 4,205 km^{2} (1,624 sq mi)

Population (2013 census)
  - Total: 121,726
  - Density: 28.95/km^{2} (74.97/sq mi)

Kaedi is a department of Gorgol Region in Mauritania.

== List of municipalities in the department ==
The Kaedi department is made up of following municipalities:

- Djeol
- Ganki
- Kaédi
- Lexelba
- Nere Walo
- Tokomadji
- Tufunde Cive

In 2013, the entire population of the Kaedi Department has a total of 121,726 inhabitants (58,835 men and 62,891 women).
