= Agharghar =

Coordinates: 16.1505°N 10.3661°W

- Commune and village
- Interactive map of Agharghar
- Country: Mauritania
- Region: Hodh El Gharbi
- Department: Tintane

Population (2000)
  - Total: 8,820
- Time zone: UTC±00:00 (GMT)

Agharghar is a village and rural commune in Mauritania.
