= Tamchekket (department) =

- Department
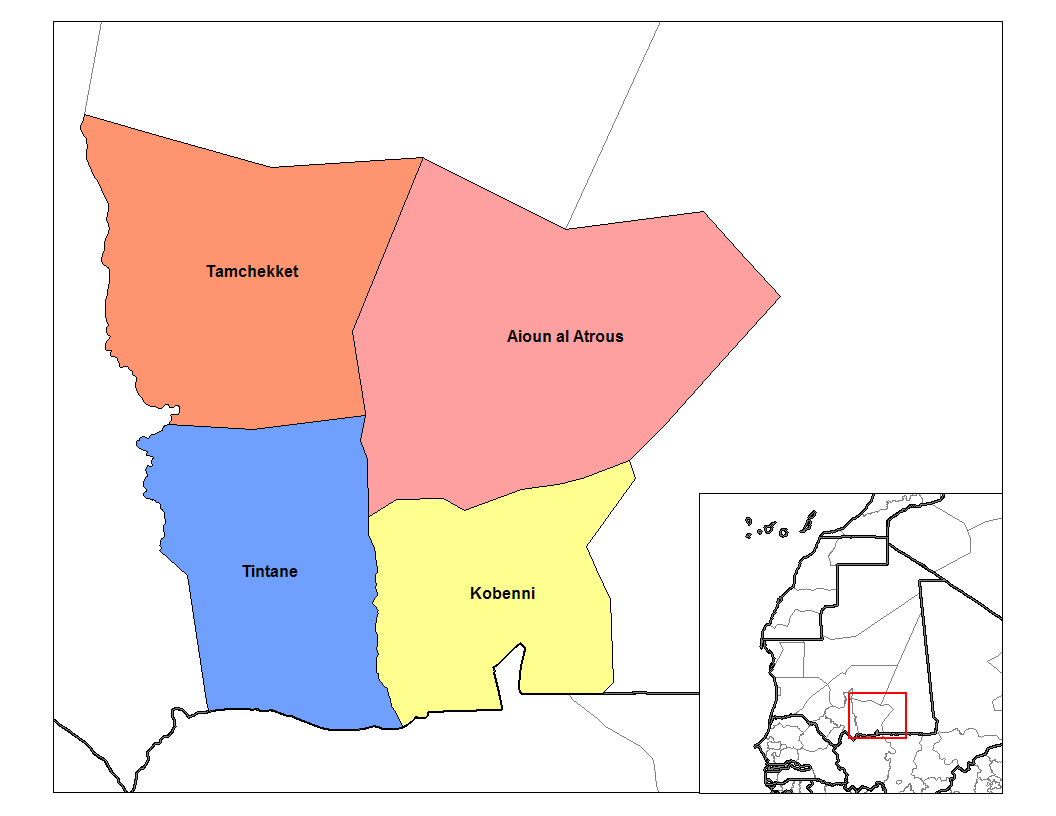

- Location within Mauritania
- Country: Mauritania

Area
  - Total: 5,097 sq mi (13,202 km^{2})

Population (2013 census)
  - Total: 39,013
  - Density: 7.6536/sq mi (2.9551/km^{2})

Tamchekket is a department of Hodh El Gharbi Region in Mauritania.

== List of municipalities in the department ==
The Tamchekket department is made up of following communes:

- El Mabrouk
- Guateidoume
- Radhi
- Sava
- Tamchakett
