= Lahrach =

- Commune and village
- Interactive map of Lahrach
- Country: Mauritania
- Region: Gorgol
- Department: M'Bout (department)

Population (2023)
  - Total: 11,917
- Time zone: UTC±00:00 (GMT)

Lahrach or Lahrache is a village and rural commune in Mauritania.
