= Blajmil =

- Commune and village
- Interactive map of Blajmil
- Country: Mauritania
- Region: Assaba
- Department: Kankossa (department)

Population (2023)
  - Total: 24,030
- Time zone: UTC±00:00 (GMT)

Blajmil is a village and rural commune in Mauritania.
