= Tikobra =

- Commune and village
- Location in Mauritania
- Country: Mauritania
- Region: Gorgol
- Department: M'Bout (department)

Population (2023)
  - Total: 14,076
- Time zone: UTC+0 (GMT)

Tikobra is a village and rural commune in Mauritania.
