= Ain Varba =

- Commune and village
- Interactive map of Ain Varba
- Country: Mauritania

Area
  - Total: 670 sq mi (1,736 km^{2})

Population (2023)
  - Total: 16,260
  - Density: 24.26/sq mi (9.366/km^{2})
- Time zone: UTC±00:00 (GMT)

Ain Varba is a village and rural commune in Tintane Department, Hodh El Gharbi, Mauritania.

In 2013, it had a population of 11,728. In 2023, it had a population of 16,260.
