= Kiffa (department) =

Kiffa كيفه
- Department
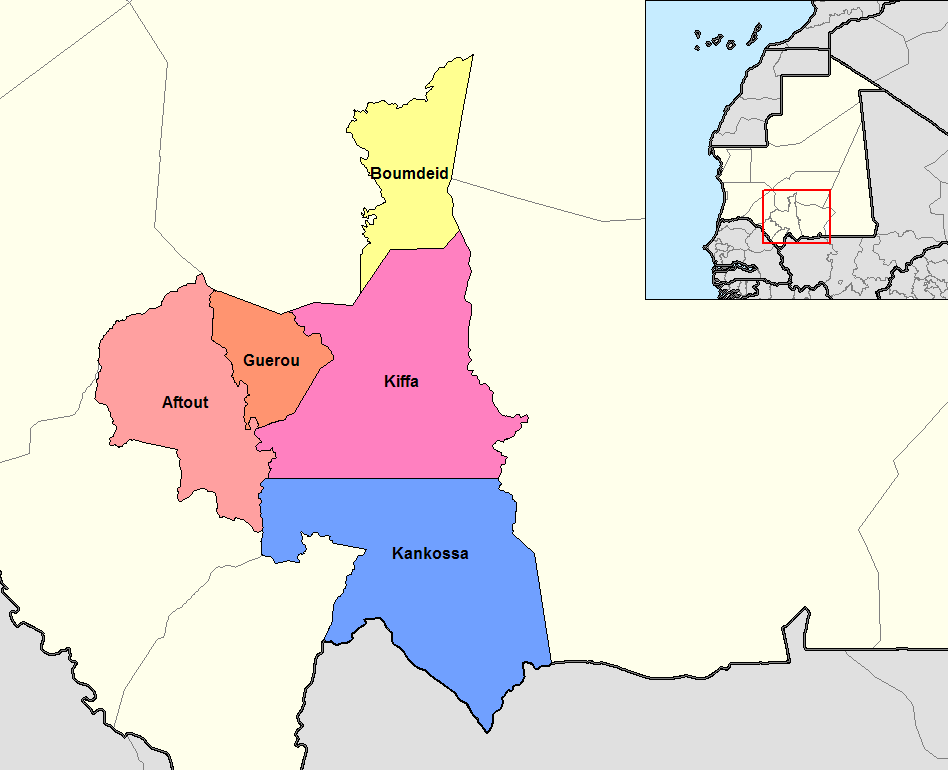

- Location within Mauritania
- Country: Mauritania

Area
  - Total: 12,307 km^{2} (4,752 sq mi)

Population (2013 census)
  - Total: 110,714
  - Density: 8.9960/km^{2} (23.300/sq mi)

Kiffa is a department of Assaba Region in Mauritania.

== List of municipalities in the department ==
The Kiffa department is made up of following municipalities:

- Aghoratt
- El Melgue
- Kiffa
- Kouroudjel
- Legrane
- Nouamline.

In 2013, the entire population of the Kiffa Department has a total of 110,714 inhabitants (51,777 men and 58,937 women).

== Constituency ==
Kiffa Constituency is a constituency in the Assaba region of Mauritania. In 2018 there were a total of 48,967 registered voters and they own 3 seats in congress, the highest in Assaba Region.
