= Hamed, Mauritania =

Hamed
- Commune and town
- Interactive map of Hamed
- Country: Mauritania
- Region: Assaba
- Department: Kankoussa

Area
  - Total: 920 sq mi (2,370 km^{2})

Population (2013)
  - Total: 25,916
  - Density: 28.3/sq mi (10.9/km^{2})
- Time zone: UTC±00:00 (GMT)

Hamed is a town and commune in Mauritania.

In 2013, it had a population of 25,916.
