= Sani, Mauritania =

- Commune and village
- Interactive map of Sani, Mauritania
- Country: Mauritania
- Region: Assaba
- Department: Kankossa (department)

Population (2023)
  - Total: 11,714
- Time zone: UTC±00:00 (GMT)

Sani, Mauritania is a village and rural commune in Mauritania. It has an oasis.
