= Leghligue =

- Commune and village
- Country: Mauritania

Population (2023)
  - Total: 16,051
- Time zone: UTC±00:00 (GMT)

Leghligue is a village and rural commune in Kobenni Department, Hodh El Gharbi, Mauritania.
