= Daw, Mauritania =

- Commune and village
- Location in Mauritania
- Country: Mauritania
- Region: Gorgol
- Department: Maghama (department)

Population (2023)
  - Total: 10,453
- Time zone: UTC±00:00 (GMT)

Daw, Mauritania is a village and rural commune in Mauritania.
