= Aghoratt =

Coordinates: 16°33′24″N 10°57′41″W

- Commune and village
- Interactive map of Aghoratt
- Country: Mauritania
- Region: Assaba
- Department: Kiffa (department)

Population (2023)
  - Total: 26,540
- Time zone: UTC±00:00 (GMT)

Aghoratt is a village and rural commune in Mauritania.

In 2023, it had a population of 26,540.
