= Azgueilem Tiyab =

- Commune and town
- Location in Mauritania Azgueilem Tiyab (Africa)
- Coordinates: 16°20′01″N 12°55′39″W
- Country: Mauritania
- Region: Gorgol
- Department: Monguel (department)

Population (2023)
  - Total: 17,266
- Time zone: UTC+0 (GMT)

Azgueilem Tiyab is a town and commune in the Gorgol Region of southern Mauritania.

In 2000, it had a population of 9,056. In 2023, it had a population of 17,266.
