= Tokomadji =

- Commune and village
- Location in Mauritania
- Coordinates: 15.73142°N 13.23867°W
- Country: Mauritania
- Region: Gorgol
- Department: Kaedi (department)

Government
  - Mayor: Ba Yahya Harouna Partie Politique INSAF, le Chef de village Ba Samba Saidou

Population (2023)
  - Total: 13,591
- Time zone: UTC+0 (GMT)

Tokomadji is a village and rural commune in Mauritania. The village was first settled by an ancestor of the village named Baaba Séga. Nowadays it has a population of around 1000 people and lies on the Senegal River. The village is divided into two big neighborhoods: the biggest part (Wouro) and the small part (Gourel Diéry). But now many people are moving to the small part, because of the river side which is coming up toward the houses that are located at its side.

The Senegal River is polluted at Tokomadji with pesticides, oil and diesel by many pumps that irrigate the agricultural areas on both sides of the river banks.

The mayor of the commune is Ba Yahya Harouna.
