= Chelkhet Tiyad =

Coordinates: 16.3736581°N 12.9891150°W

- Commune and village
- Interactive map of Chelkhet Tiyad
- Country: Mauritania
- Region: Gorgol
- Department: M'Bout (department)

Population (2023)
  - Total: 10,901
- Time zone: UTC±00:00 (GMT)

Chelkhet Tiyad is a village and rural commune in Mauritania.
