= Legrane =

- Commune and town
- Country: Mauritania
- Region: Assaba
- Department: Kiffa (department)

Area
  - Total: 1,240 sq mi (3,211 km^{2})

Population (2023 census)
  - Total: 13,352
  - Density: 10.77/sq mi (4.158/km^{2})
- Time zone: UTC±00:00 (GMT)

Legrane is a town and commune in Mauritania.
