= Kankossa (department) =

Kankossa كنكوصة
- Department
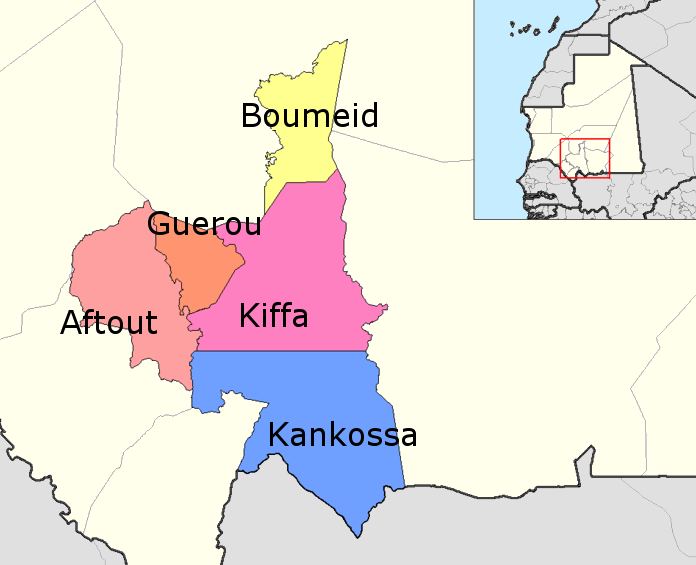
- Country: Mauritania

Area
  - Total: 3,955 sq mi (10,243 km^{2})

Population (2013 census)
  - Total: 82,495
  - Density: 20.859/sq mi (8.0538/km^{2})

Kankossa is a department of Assaba Region in Mauritania.

== List of municipalities in the department ==
The Kankossa department is made up of following municipalities:

- Blajmil
- Hamod
- Kankossa
- Sani
- Tenaha.

In 2013, the entire population of the Kankossa Department has a total of 82,495 inhabitants (39,783 men and 42,712 women).

== Constituency ==
Kankossa is an electoral district in the Assaba region of Mauritania. In 2018 there were a total of 21,781 registered voters and they own 2 seats in congress.
