= Aweintat I =

- Commune and village
- Interactive map of Aweintat I
- Country: Mauritania

Population (2023)
  - Total: 13,705
- Time zone: UTC±00:00 (GMT)

Aweintat I is a village and rural commune in Tintane Department, Hodh El Gharbi, Mauritania.
