= Devaa =

- Commune and village
- Country: Mauritania
- Region: Hodh El Gharbi
- Department: Tintane

Area
  - Total: 579 sq mi (1,499 km^{2})

Population (2023 census)
  - Total: 15,884
  - Density: 27.44/sq mi (10.60/km^{2})
- Time zone: UTC±00:00 (GMT)

Devaa is a village and rural commune in Tintane Department, Hodh El Gharbi, Mauritania.

In 2013, it had a population of 10,668. In 2023, it had a population of 15,844.
