= Moussa Diagana =

Mauritanian French language writer (1946–2018)

- Born: 1946; M'Bout
- Died: 15 January 2018 (aged 71–72)
- Citizenship: Mauritania
- Occupation(s): Writer, Screenwriter

Moussa Diagana (M'Bout, 1946 – 2018) was a Mauritanian French language writer. He studied in Nouakchott, Tunisia and the Sorbonne and worked in Mali.

He died on the night of 15 January 2018.

== Works ==
- La Légende du Wagadu, vue par Sïa Yatabéré, 1988 (theatre)
- Targuiya, 2001 (theatre)
