= Toutel =

- Commune and village
- Location in Mauritania
- Coordinates: 15°20′15″N 12°49′28″W
- Country: Mauritania
- Region: Gorgol
- Department: Maghama (department)

Population (2023)
  - Total: 10,857
- Time zone: UTC+0 (GMT)

Toutel is a village and rural commune in Mauritania, near the border of Senegal.
