= Guateidoume =

- Commune and village
- Interactive map of Guateidoume
- Country: Mauritania

Population (2023)
  - Total: 10,992
- Time zone: UTC±00:00 (GMT)

Guateidoume is a village and rural commune in Tamchekket Department, Hodh El Gharbi, Mauritania.
