= Tufunde Cive =

- Commune and town
- Location in Mauritania
- Country: Mauritania
- Region: Gorgol
- Department: Kaedi (department)

Government
  - Mayor: Hachim Hami Abdi (PRDS)

Population (2023)
  - Total: 10,374
- Time zone: UTC±00:00 (GMT)

Tufunde Cive (Arabic: تفوند سيفي) is a town and commune in Mauritania. Foreign Christians operate charities in the town, but apostacy from Islam is a capital crime in Mauritania, so there are no churches there. There is a pedestrian border crossing at the border with Senegal.
