= Oum Lahyad =

Oum Lahyad ام لحياظ
- Commune and village
- Country: Mauritania
- Region: Hodh El Gharbi
- Department: Ayoun el Atrous

Area
  - Total: 2,273 sq mi (5,886 km^{2})

Population (2023)
  - Total: 11,466
  - Density: 4.84/sq mi (1.868/km^{2})
- Time zone: UTC±00:00 (GMT)

Oum Lahyad is a village and rural commune located in the department of Ayoun el Atrous, in the region of Hodh El Gharbi in the country of Mauritania.

As of the census completed on 25 March 2013, Oum Lahyad has a population of 10,997. This is a 54% increase from the 7,139 figured reported on the previous and only other recorded census in November 2000.
