= M'Bout (department) =

M'Bout امبود
- Department
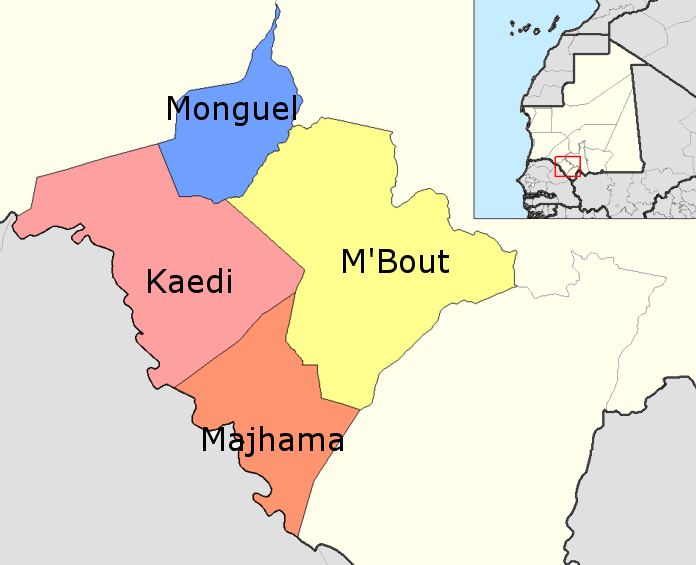

- Location within Mauritania
- Country: Mauritania

Area
  - Total: 5,504 km^{2} (2,125 sq mi)

Population (2013 census)
  - Total: 102,502
  - Density: 18.62/km^{2} (48.23/sq mi)

M'Bout is a department of Gorgol Region in Mauritania.

== List of municipalities in the department ==
The M'Bout department is made up of following municipalities:

- Chelkhet Tiyad
- Diadibeny Gandega
- Edebaye Ehl Guelay
- Foum Gleita
- Lahrach
- M'Bout
- Souve
- Tarenguet Ehel Moul
- Tikobra

In 2000, the entire population of the M'Bout Department has a total of 77 816 inhabitants (37 982 men and 39 834 women).
