= List of presidents of the Senate of Mauritania =

List of presidents of the Senate of Mauritania (French: Le Président du Sénat de Mauritanie) until it was abolished in August 2017.

Below is a list of Office-holders:

Name	Entered office	Left office	Notes
Dieng Boubou Farba	4 April 1992	5 August 2005	
Ba Mamadou Mbaré	10 April 2006	11 January 2013	
Mohamed El Hacen Ould El Hadj	19 January 2013	6 August 2017	
