= Nere Walo =

- Commune and village
- Interactive map of Nere Walo
- Country: Mauritania
- Region: Gorgol
- Department: Kaedi (department)

Population (2023)
  - Total: 11,653
- Time zone: UTC±00:00 (GMT)

Nere Walo is a village and rural commune in Mauritania.
