= Bokkol =

- Commune and town
- Location in Mauritania
- Coordinates: 16.4741°N 12.9670°W
- Country: Mauritania
- Region: Gorgol
- Department: Monguel (department)

Population (2023)
  - Total: 14,232
- Time zone: UTC±00:00 (GMT)

Bokkol is a town and commune in Mauritania.

On the west of the town there is the Bokkol Mosque (مسجد بوكل) that serves the local community of Bokkol.
