= Assaba Massif =

Mountainous area located in southern Mauritania

Assaba

Geography
- Country: Mauritania
- Region: Assaba region
- Range coordinates: 16°N 12°W

The Assaba Massif is a mountainous area located in southern Mauritania. The Assaba region, a national administrative division, is named after the mountain range, but it also extends into the Guidimaka region. The Massif, where Late Ordovician glacial formations have been identified, is a southward prolongation of the Tagant Plateau.

== See also ==
- Dhar Tichitt
- Geography of Mauritania
