= Djeol =

Coordinates: 16°04′N 13°23′W

- Commune and town
- Interactive map of Djeol
- Country: Mauritania
- Region: Gorgol
- Department: Kaedi (department)

Population (2023)
  - Total: 22,252
- Time zone: UTC±00:00 (GMT)

Djeol is a town and commune in Mauritania, near the border of Senegal.
