= El Melgua =

- Commune and village
- Country: Mauritania
- Region: Assaba
- Department: Kiffa (department)

Population (2023)
  - Total: 12,265
- Time zone: UTC±00:00 (GMT)

El Melgua is a village and rural commune in Mauritania.
