= Ouad Amour =

- Commune and village
- Country: Mauritania
- Region: Brakna
- Department: Magtar Lahjar (department)

Government
  - Mayor: Khalif O/ Bah Naji O/ Mohamed Radhi (PRDS)

Population (2023)
  - Total: 15,291
- Time zone: UTC+0 (GMT)

Ouad Amour or Ouad Emour is a village and rural commune in the Brakna Region of southern Mauritania.

In 2000, it had a population of 10,419. In 2023, it had a population of 15,291.
