= M'Bout =

Coordinates: 16°01′N 12°35′W

Mbout
- Commune and town
- Interactive map of Mbout
- Country: Mauritania
- Region: Gorgol
- Department: M'Bout (department)

Population (2023)
  - Total: 16,813
- Time zone: UTC±00:00 (GMT)

Mbout is a town and commune in Mauritania. Located in the Gorgol Region, it is the birthplace of Moussa Diagana. Government officials toured the village in 2013, with the aim of development. As of the later 20th century, the primary occupation was cattle raising.
