= Guerou =

Guerou كرو
- Commune and town
- Location in Mauritania
- Coordinates: 16°49′N 11°50′W
- Country: Mauritania
- Region: Assaba Region

Population (2013 Census)
  - Total: 22,323
- Time zone: UTC±0 (UTC)

Guerou is a city and department in south-central Mauritania. Guerou is the region's largest city after Kiffa, capital of Assaba Region. It is located at around 16°49′N 11°50′W.

According to the official census, the city's population was 14,418 in 1996, which ranked it in 15th place by population in the country.

At the 2013 census report, its population was 22,323.
