= Aere Mbar =

- Commune and town
- Location in Mauritania
- Coordinates: 16°25′0″N 14°4′2″W
- Country: Mauritania
- Region: Brakna
- Department: Bababe (department)

Government
  - Mayor: Moussa Hamady Sy

Population (2023)
  - Total: 19,050
- Time zone: UTC+0 (GMT)

Aere Mbar is a town and commune in the Brakna Region of south-western Mauritania. It is located near the border with Senegal.

In 2000, it had a population of 13,722. In 2023, it had a population of 19,050.
