= Hassi Ehel Ahmed Bechna =

Coordinates: 16°12′11″N 9°33′11″W

Hassi Ehel Ahmed Bechna ایک گاؤں ہے
- Commune and village
- Interactive map of Hassi Ehel Ahmed Bechna
- Country: Mauritania

Population (2023)
  - Total: 15,517
- Time zone: UTC±00:00 (GMT)

Hassi Ehel Ahmed Bechna is a village and rural commune in Kobenni, Hodh El Gharbi, Mauritania.
