= Modibougou =

- Commune and village
- Country: Mauritania

Population (2023)
  - Total: 23,410
- Time zone: UTC±00:00 (GMT)

Modibougou is a village and rural commune in Mauritania, and is part of the Kobenni Department. The rural commune had a population of 12,677 in 2000, 16,550 in 2013, and 23,410 in 2023.
