= Senate of Mauritania =

1992–2017 upper house of parliament

Senate: مجلس الشيوخ (Arabic); Sénat (French)

Type
- Type: Upper house of Parliament of Mauritania

History
- Founded: April 1992
- Disbanded: August 2017

Leadership
- President: Mohamed El Hacen Ould El Hadj (last)
- Seats: 56

Elections
- Voting system: 53 members elected indirectly for a six-year term by municipal councillors with one third renewed every two years; 3 members elected by Mauritanians abroad
- Last election: 21 January – 4 February 2007

The Senate (Arabic: مجلس الشيوخ, romanized: Majlis ash-Shuyūkh, French: Sénat) was the upper house of Parliament in Mauritania from April 1992 to August 2017. The Senate had 56 members, 53 members elected indirectly for a six-year term by municipal councillors with one third renewed every two years and 3 members elected by Mauritanians abroad.

The Senate was an attempt to guarantee a minimum level of representation to every part of Mauritania, irrespective of population. The Senate had especially budgetary, financial and oversight powers.

In 2017, the Senate was abolished as a result of a constitutional referendum; the last election was held in 2007.

== See also ==
- List of presidents of the Senate of Mauritania
