= Sagne, Mauritania =

Sagne
- Commune and village
- Interactive map of Sagne
- Coordinates: 15°12′N 12°47′W
- Country: Mauritania
- Region: Gorgol
- Department: Maghama (department)

Population (2023)
  - Total: 13,322
- Time zone: UTC±00:00 (GMT)

Sagne is a village and rural commune in Mauritania, located on the border with Senegal.
