= Tenaha, Mauritania =

Tenaha
- Commune and village
- Location in Mauritania
- Country: Mauritania
- Region: Assaba
- Department: Kankossa (department)

Population (2023)
  - Total: 21,765
- Time zone: UTC+0 (GMT)

Tenaha is a village and rural commune in Mauritania. There is a border crossing at the border with Mali, which may be accessed only during peaceful times.
