= Fassala =

- Commune and town
- Location in Mauritania
- Coordinates: 15°33′2″N 5°23′35″W
- Country: Mauritania
- Region: Hodh Ech Chargui

Government
  - Mayor: Sid’Amar O/ Dabi (PRDS)

Area
  - Commune and town: 1,094 sq mi (2,833 km^{2})

Population (2013)
  - Commune and town: 65,927
  - Density: 60.27/sq mi (23.27/km^{2})
  - Urban: 53,376
- Time zone: UTC+0 (GMT)

Fassala, Fassale, Fessale, or Vassale (Arabic: فصالة) is a town and commune in the Hodh Ech Chargui Region of south-eastern Mauritania, on the Malian border.

In 2013, it had a population of 65,927. In 2023, it had a population of 79,508.
