= Kankossa =

Coordinates: 15°56′N 11°32′W

- Commune and town
- Interactive map of Kankossa
- Country: Mauritania
- Region: Assaba
- Department: Kankossa (department)

Population (2023)
  - Total: 23,435
- Time zone: UTC±00:00 (GMT)

Kankossa is a town and commune the Assaba region of Mauritania. In 1944, the French colonial government transferred Kankossa from French Sudan to Mauritania, where it remained after independence.
