= Voulaniya =

- Commune and village
- Country: Mauritania

Population (2023)
  - Total: 21,184 (commune)
- Time zone: UTC+0 (GMT)

Voulaniya is a village and rural commune in Mauritania. In the 2023 census, the population of the rural commune was 21,184, up from 12,920 in the 2013 census and 9,460 in the 2000 census.
