= Maghama =

Coordinates: 15°31′N 12°51′W

- Commune and town
- Interactive map of Maghama
- Country: Mauritania
- Region: Gorgol
- Department: Maghama (department)

Area
  - Total: 77.8 sq mi (201.4 km^{2})

Population (2023 census)
  - Total: 22,551
  - Density: 290.0/sq mi (112.0/km^{2})
- Time zone: UTC±00:00 (GMT)

Maghama is a town and commune in Mauritania.
