= Kobenni =

- Commune and town
- Location in Mauritania
- Coordinates: 15°49′N 9°22′W
- Country: Mauritania
- Region: Hodh El Gharbi

Kobenni or Kobeni is a town and commune in southern Mauritania, in Northwest Africa, as is the administrative headquarters of Kobenni Department.

Population in the 2023 census was 19,250, population is the 2013 census was 11,833, and population in the 2000 census was 6,291. The town is 257 km² and mostly agricultural and urban-commune.

== See also ==
- Departments of Mauritania
- Kobenni (department)
