= Ayoun el Atrous =

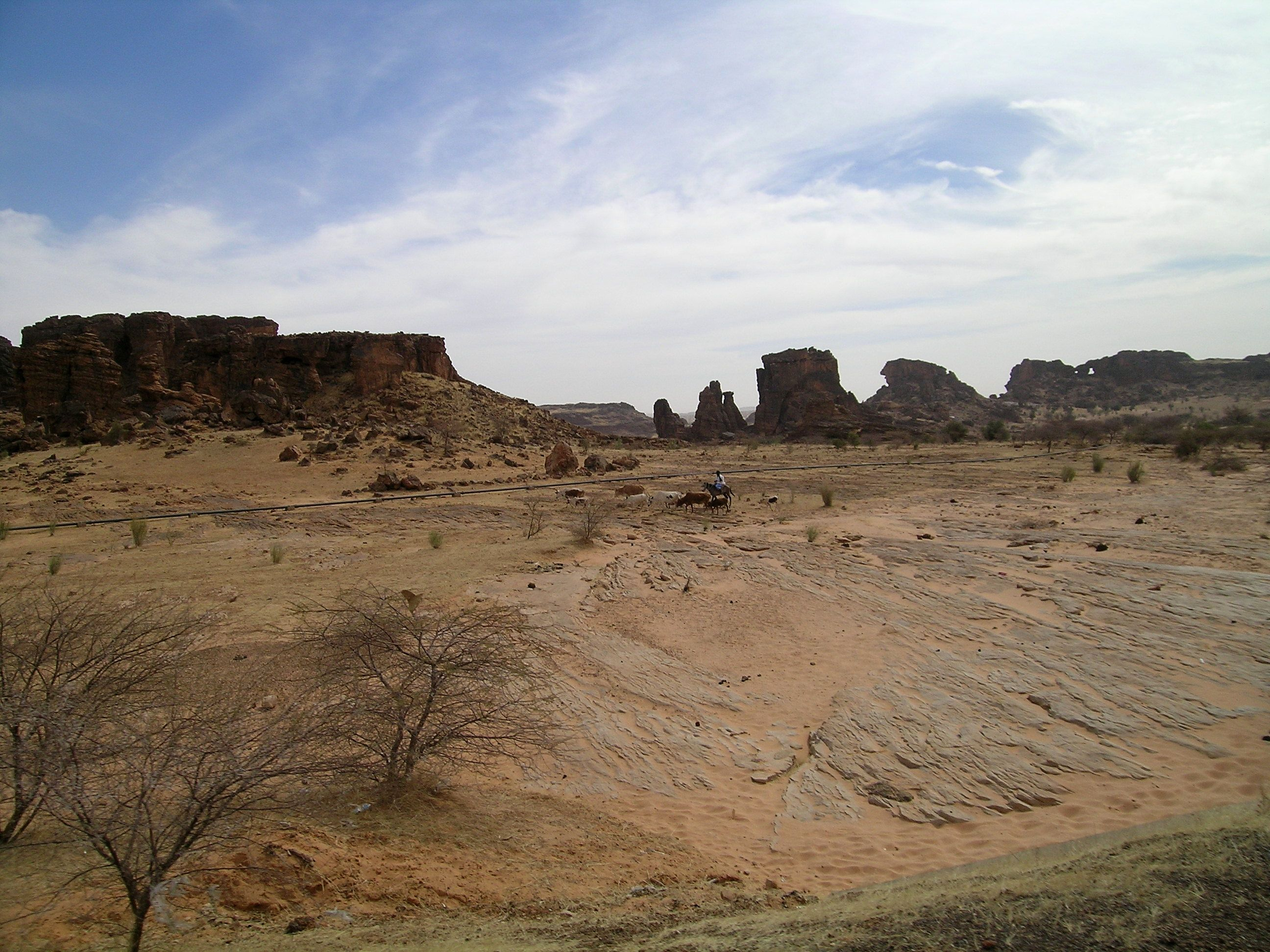
- Rural Ayoun el Atrous

- Location in Mauritania
- Coordinates: 16°40′N 9°37′W
- Country: Mauritania
- Region: Hodh El Gharbi

Area
  - Total: 111.4 km^{2} (43.0 sq mi)
- Elevation: 259 m (850 ft)

Population (2023 census)
  - Total: 36,517

Ayoun al Atrous (also known as Aioun el Atrouss) (Arabic: عيون العتروس) is a town in southern Mauritania. It is located at around 16°40′0″N 9°37′0″W. It is the capital of Hodh El Gharbi region.

The city is served by the Aioun el Atrouss Airport, 6 kilometres (4 mi) north-west of the city. The town is located in the southern area of the Aoukar, a former lake basin.

Ayoun al Atrous was one of the stops in the 2007 Dakar Rally.
