= Gorgol River =

River in the Basque Country

Gorgol
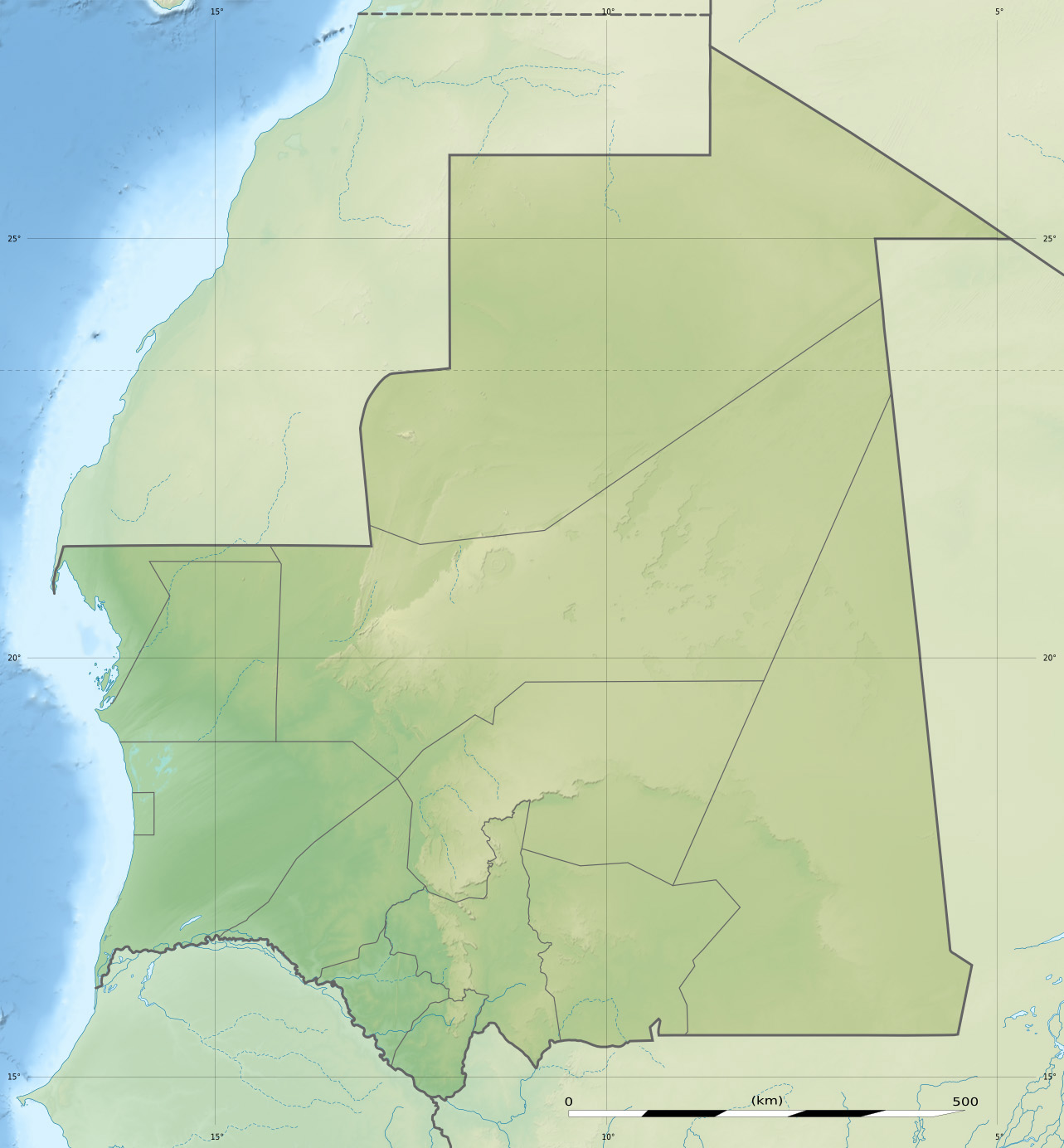

Location
- Country: Mauritania

Physical characteristics
- Mouth
  - location: Sénégal River
  - coordinates: 16°08′56″N 13°29′21″W

The Gorgol River is a river of southern Mauritania that is a tributary of the Sénégal River. The river is formed by the confluence of the Gorgol Noir (194 km in length), with the Gorgol Blanc (345 km in length). The Gorgol joins the Sénégal River at Kaédi.

The river basin plays an important in role in Mauritanian economy facilitated by investment in the 1970s.
