= Tintane =

Tintane طينطان
- Commune and town
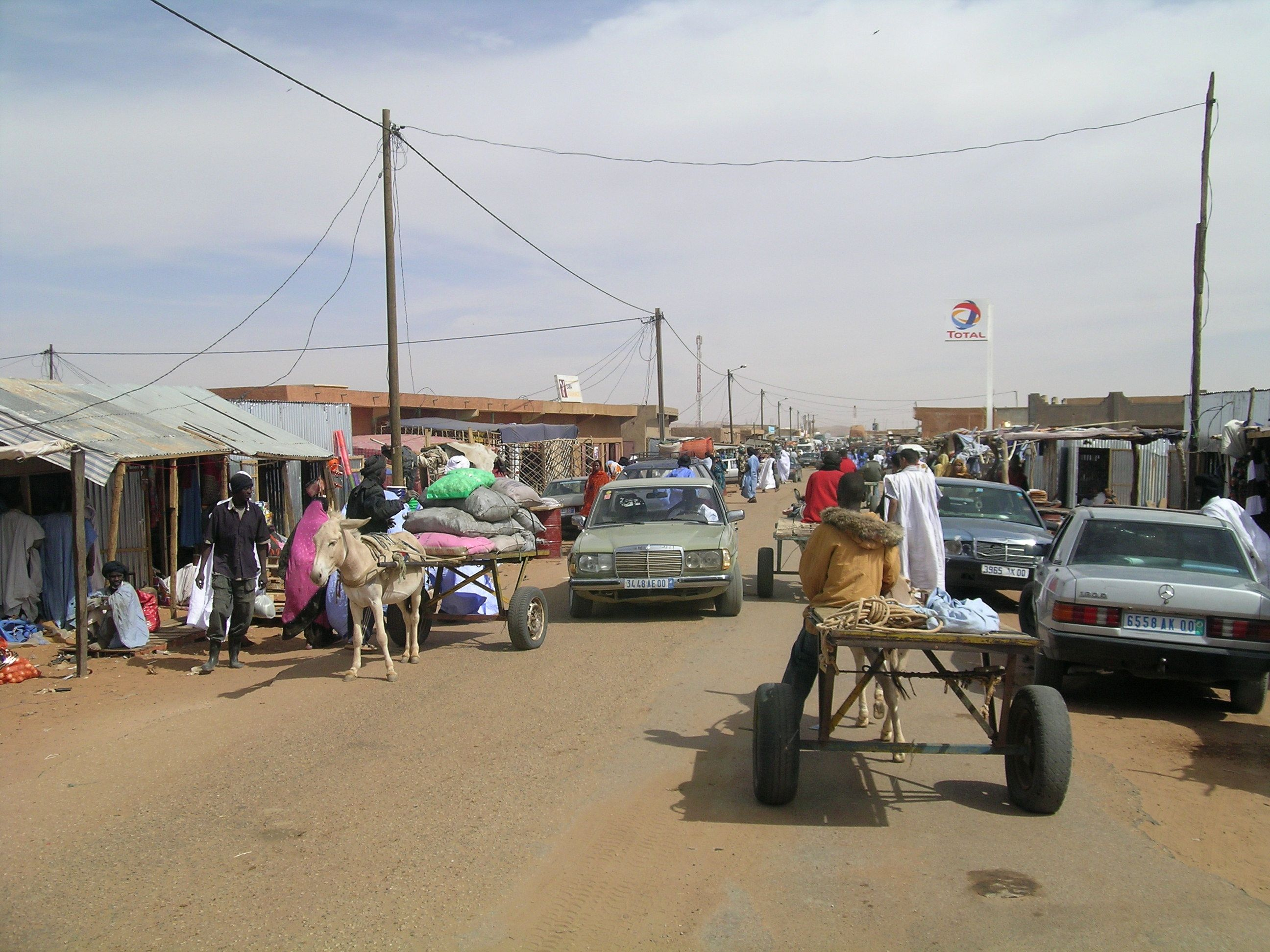
- Street view of Tintane

- Location in Mauritania
- Coordinates: 16°24′N 10°10′W
- Country: Mauritania

Population (2023)
  - Total: 35,995
- Time zone: UTC+0 (GMT)

Tintane (Arabic: طينطان) is a town and commune in Mauritania. It is located in the Hodh El Gharbi region of Mauritania, and is an important stop on the "Road of Hope", the largest and most important road in Mauritania, which links Nouakchott to Néma.
