= Assaba region =

Region of Mauritania

Assaba ولاية العصابة
- Region
- Coordinates: 16°36′N 11°55′W
- Country: Mauritania
- Departments: 5: Barkeol; Boumdeid; Guerou; Kankossa; Kiffa
- Capital: Kiffa

Area
  - Total: 36,600 km^{2} (14,100 sq mi)

Population (2023)
  - Total: 451,804
  - Density: 12.3/km^{2} (32.0/sq mi)
- Time zone: UTC+0
  - Summer (DST): not observed
- HDI (2017): 0.476 low

Assaba (Arabic: ولاية العصابة, romanized: Wilāyat Alʻṣābah) is a region in southern Mauritania, covering an area of 36,600 square km. It had a population of 325,897 at the 2013 Census. Its capital is Kiffa. Other major cities/towns include Guerou. The region borders the Mauritanian regions of Brakna and Tagant to the north, the Mauritanian region of Hodh El Gharbi to the east, Mali to the south and the Mauritanian regions of Gorgol and Guidimaka to the west.

The region is named after the Assaba Massif. The Aoukar basin, which formerly gave name to the greater region, is located in the north and the east of the central part of Assaba.

== Demographics ==
As of 2013, the population of the region was 325,897, compared to 338,708 in 2011. There were 46.73 percent females and 53.27 percent males. As of 2008, the activity percentage was 46.00 and the economic dependency ratio was 1.13. The percentage of people working in the government was 3.50, individual/household privates was 27.80, others was 66.30, para-public was 0.60 and private enterprises was 1.80. The grand total as of 2008 was 641.13. As of 2007, the number of tourist establishments in the region was 3. As of 2008, the percentage of couples with children was 32.80 and couples without children was 3.50. The proportion with extended families was 22.00 percent and extended single-parents was 13.00 percent, one-person was 3.70 percent and single-parent nuclear was 25.00 percent.

== Economy and health ==
As of 2013, the coverage percentage of DPT3 children from 0 to 11 months in the region was 86.10, BGC vaccination was 107.70 and polio vaccination coverage was 83.40.

As of 2008, the percentage of households confirming the existence of public telephones in their neighbourhood or village was 78.24, households benefiting from electricity posts in their neighbourhood was 2.91, households benefitting from health centers or health posts in their neighbourhood was 4.85 and households benefiting from sanitary services was 1.66. As of 2008, the literacy rate for people aged 15 years and over was 50.30 percent. The net enrollment rate in secondary level was 7.00 percent for girls and 7.20 percent for boys, adding up to 7.10 percent in total.

== Local administration ==
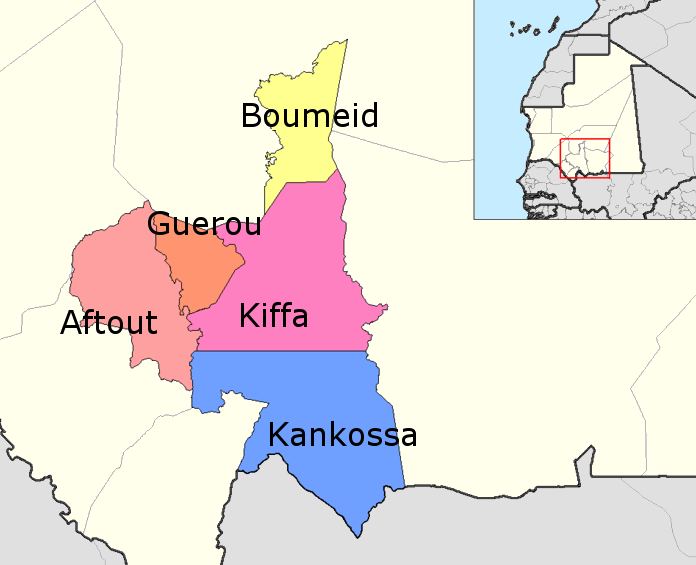
Departments of Assaba.

The Assaba Region is divided into five departments:

Region	Area (km^{2})	Population at Census 25 March 2013
Barkeol (formerly Aftout)	7,000	79,901
Boumdeïd	4,700	7,917
Guerou	3,600	44,870
Kankoussa	10,600	82,495
Kiffa	10,700	110,714

== See also ==
- Regions of Mauritania
- Departments of Mauritania
