= Hodh El Gharbi region =

Region of Mauritania

Hodh El Gharbi ولاية الحوض الغربي
- Region of Mauritania
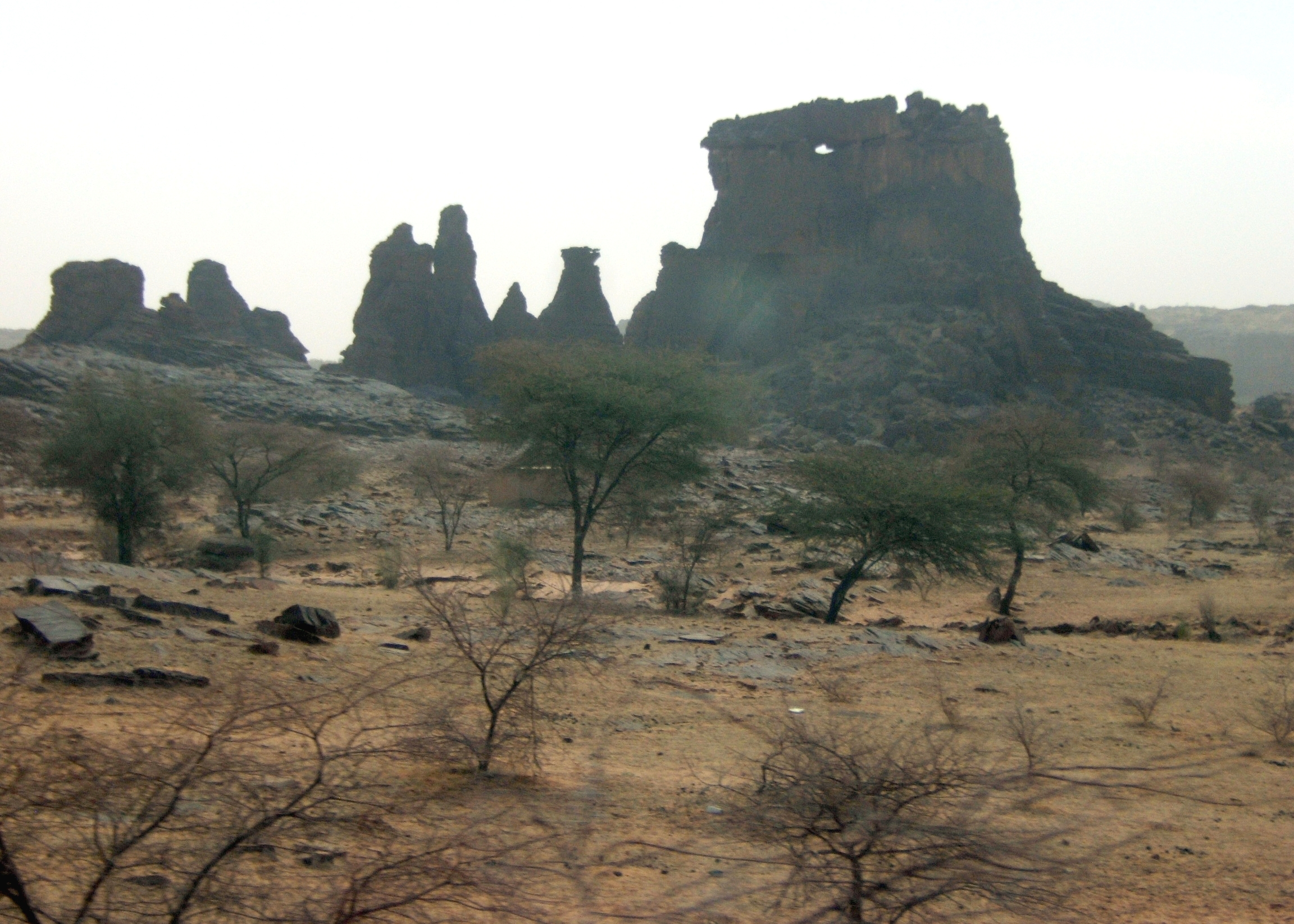
- Landscape in Hodh El Gharbi (near Ayoun)

- Coordinates: 16°30′N 10°00′W
- Country: Mauritania
- Departments: 4: Aïoun; Koubenni; Tamchekett; Tintane
- Capital: Ayoun el Atrous

Area
  - Total: 53,400 km^{2} (20,600 sq mi)

Population (2023 census)
  - Total: 403,091
  - Density: 7.55/km^{2} (19.6/sq mi)
- Time zone: UTC+0
  - Summer (DST): not observed
- HDI (2017): 0.528 low

Hodh El Gharbi (Arabic: ولاية الحوض الغربي, romanized: Wilāyat al-Ḥawḍ al-Gharbī, lit. 'Western Basin Region') is a region in southern Mauritania, with an area of 53,400 square km. The population at the 2013 census was 294,109. Its capital is Aïoun (formerly called Ayoun el Atrous). The region borders the Mauritanian regions of Tagant to the north, Hodh Ech Chargui to the east and Assaba to the west. To the south in borders Mali, and a part of Malian territory protrudes into the region. The Aoukar basin, which formerly gave name to a greater region, is located in the northern and central part of Hodh El Gharbi, extending eastwards.

As of 2013, the population of the region was 294,109, compared to 274,443 in 2011. There were 47.53 per cent females and 52.47 per cent males. As of 2008, the activity rate was 52.00 and economic dependency ratio was 0.88. As of 2008, the literacy rate for people aged 15 years and over was 67.10.

== Geography ==
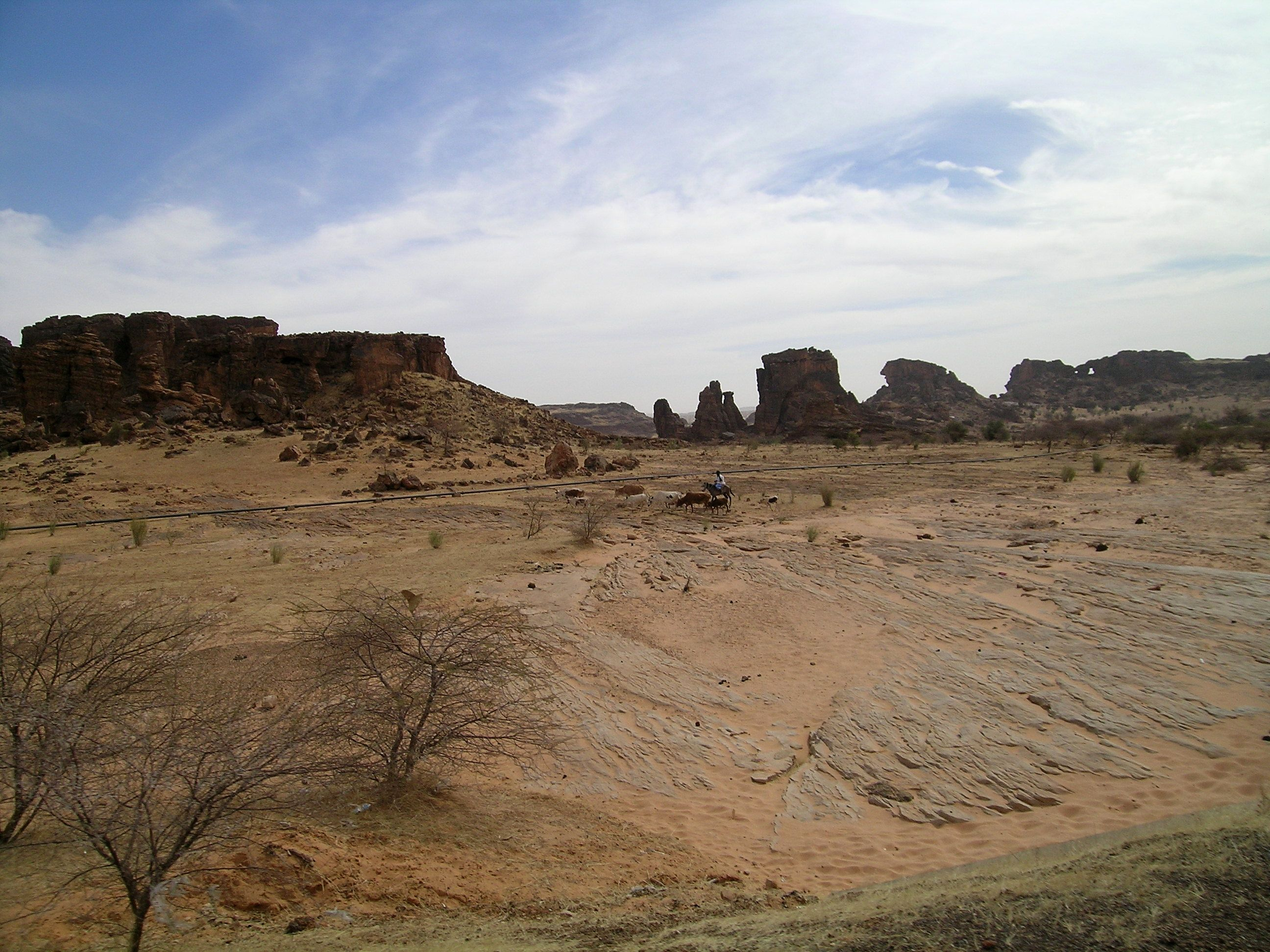
Landscape near Ayoun

Mauritania is mostly covered with desert, with only its western regions around the coast of Atlantic Ocean having some vegetation. There are some oasis in the desert regions. Since it is a desert, there are large shifting dunes forming temporary ranges. The average elevation is around 460 m (1,510 ft) above the mean sea level. The rainfall in the northern regions closer to the Tropic of Cancer receives around 100 mm (3.9 in) of annual rainfall compared to the southern portions that receives around 660 mm (26 in). The average temperature is 37.8 °C (100.0 °F), while during the night it reaches 0 °C (32 °F).

Due to the geography, the inhabitants historically, have been nomadic. In modern times, people have migrated to urban centres during the drought in the 1970s and the early 1980s. There are a few sedentary cultivators, who are located only in the Southern regions of the country. Research has indicated that the Saharan movement has resulted in reduction of rains in the region from the 1960s, when it received close to 250 mm (9.8 in) of rainfall.

== Demographics ==
Historical population
Year	Pop.	±% p.a.
1977	124,194	—
1988	159,296	+2.29%
2000	212,156	+2.42%
2013	294,109	+2.54%
2023	403,091	+3.20%

As of 2013, the population of the region was 294,109, compared to 274,443 in 2011. There were 47.53 per cent females and 52.47 per cent males. As of 2008, the Couples with children was 53.80 and Couples without children was 3.70. The proportion with extended family was 17.70 per cent and extended single-parent was 8.40 per cent, one-person was 1.60 per cent, and single-parent nuclear was 14.80 per cent.

As of 2008, the rate of household confirming the existence of public telephone in their neighbourhood or village was 57.64, rate of households benefiting from electricity post in their neighbourhood was 1.91 per cent, rate of households benefiting from health center or health post in their neighbourhood was 4.84 per cent, and rate of households benefiting from sanitary services was 0.32 per cent.

== Economy ==
As of 2008, the activity rate was 52.00 and economic dependency ratio was 0.88. The fraction of people working in government was 8.90 per cent, individual / household private was 51.30 per cent, other was 38.60 per cent, para public was 0.40 per cent, and private enterprise was 0.90 per cent. The Grand Total as of 2008 was 584.98. As of 2013, the coverage rate of DPT3 Children From 0 to 11 Months in the region was 68.20 per cent, BGC vaccination was 85.20 and polio vaccination coverage was 67.60. As of 2007, the number of tourist establishments in the region was 3. As of 2008, the literacy rate for people aged 15 years and over was 67.10. The net enrolment ratio of girls for secondary level was 11.30 per cent, net enrolment ratio of boys for secondary level was 8.40 per cent, and Total net enrolment ratio at secondary level was 9.90 per cent.

== Local administration ==
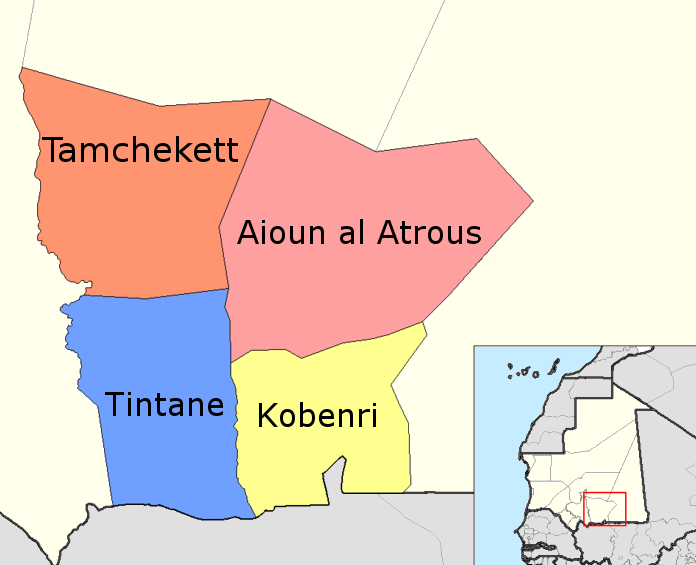
Departments of Hodh El Gharbi.

Department	Area (km^{2})	Population at Census 25 March 2013
Aïoun	18,960	65,237
Koubenni	8,765	92,690
Tamchekket	13,565	39,013
Tintane	12,110	97,169

The local administration is adopted from French local administration framework with a Ministry of Internal Control governing the local bodies. The original administration was held by Governors of each district, but after the municipal elections in 1994, the powers has been decentralized from the district bodies. Mauritania has been divided into 13 wilayas (regions), including the Nouakchott Capital District. The smallest administrative division in the country is the commune and the country has 216 of them. A group of communes form a moughataa (department) and the group of moughataa form a district. There are total of 53 moughataa for the 13 districts in the country. The executive power of the district is vested on a district chief, while it is on hakem for moughataa. Out of the 216 communes, 53 classified as urban and rest 163 are rural.

The communes are responsible for overseeing and coordinating development activities and are financed by the state. The Local Governments have their own legal jurisdiction, financial autonomy, an annual budget, staff, and an office. The elections for the local government are conducted every five years along with Regional and Parliamentary elections. On account of the political instability, the last elections were held in 2023.

Hodh El Gharbi Region is divided into four departments, listed below with their area and populations at the 2013 census.

== See also ==
- Departments of Mauritania
- Regions of Mauritania
