= Communes of Mauritania =

Third-level administrative subdivision of Mauritania

Communes of Mauritania بلديات موريتانيا (Arabic) Communes de Mauritanie (French)
- Category: Commune
- Location: Mauritania
- Found in: Departments
- Number: 238 (as of 2023)
- Government: Municipal council

Communes (Arabic: بلديات, romanized: baladiyyāt, French: communes) are the third and lowest level of administrative subdivision of the Mauritania. There are 238 communes in Mauritania as of 2023.

== List ==
Region	Department	Commune	Population	Area
Adrar	Aoujeft	Aoujeft	5,362	
Adrar	Aoujeft	El Medah	3,402	
Adrar	Aoujeft	Maaden	3,477	
Adrar	Aoujeft	Ntrguent	1,636	
Adrar	Atar	Atar	35,170	
Adrar	Atar	Ain Ehel Taya	4,750	
Adrar	Atar	Choum	2,168	
Adrar	Atar	Tawaz	5,276	
Adrar	Chinguetti	Chinguetti	4,844	
Adrar	Chinguetti	Ain Savra	1,705	
Adrar	Ouadane	Ouadane	3,833	km^{2}
Assaba	Aftout	Barkeol	12,091	
Assaba	Aftout	Bou Lahrath	12,857	
Assaba	Aftout	Daghveg	12,978	
Assaba	Aftout	El Ghabra	21,562	
Assaba	Aftout	Gueller	7,633	
Assaba	Aftout	Leouossy	20,703	
Assaba	Aftout	Lebhir	9,165	
Assaba	Aftout	Rdheidhi	12,248	
Assaba	Boumdeid	Boumdeid	5,317	
Assaba	Boumdeid	Laftah	3,189	
Assaba	Boumdeid	Hsey Tine	2,241	
Assaba	Guerou	Guerou	40,315	
Assaba	Guerou	El Ghaire	13,279	
Assaba	Guerou	Kamour	10,717	
Assaba	Guerou	Oueid Jrid	3,653	
Assaba	Kankossa	Kankossa	23,435	
Assaba	Kankossa	Blajmil	24,030	
Assaba	Kankossa	Hamod	36,448	
Assaba	Kankossa	Sani	11,714	
Assaba	Kankossa	Tenaha	21,765	
Assaba	Kiffa	Kiffa	84,101	
Assaba	Kiffa	Aghoratt	26,540	
Assaba	Kiffa	El Melgua	12,265	
Assaba	Kiffa	Kouroudel	4,079	
Assaba	Kiffa	Legrane	13,352	
Assaba	Kiffa	Nouamleine	6,127	
Brakna	Aleg	Aleg	27,120	
Brakna	Aleg	Aghchorguitt	10,328	
Brakna	Aleg	Bouhdida	27,203	
Brakna	Aleg	Cheggar	11,205	
Brakna	Bababe	Bababe	14,513	
Brakna	Bababe	Aere Mbar	19,050	
Brakna	Bababe	El Verea	9,847	
Brakna	Bogué	Boghé	50,205	
Brakna	Bogué	Dar El Aviya	5,518	
Brakna	Bogué	Dar El Barka	15,248	
Brakna	Bogué	Ould Birem	14,362	
Brakna	Magta Lahjar	Magta Lahjar	25,704	
Brakna	Magta Lahjar	Dionaba	14,038	
Brakna	Magta Lahjar	Ouad Amour	15,291	
Brakna	Magta Lahjar	Sangrave	24,013	
Brakna	Mal	Mal	14,056	
Brakna	Mal	Bourat	16,059	
Brakna	Mal	Dielwar	8,920	
Brakna	Mal	Elbatha	6,437	
Brakna	Mal	Lem Oudou	9,328	
Brakna	Mbagne	Mbagne	12,719	
Brakna	Mbagne	Bagodine	12,303	
Brakna	Mbagne	Edbaye El Hejaj	12,151	
Brakna	Mbagne	Niabina	15,692	
Dakhlet Nouadhibou	Chami	Chami	4,214	
Dakhlet Nouadhibou	Chami	Nouamghar	1,553	
Dakhlet Nouadhibou	Chami	Tmeimichatt	1,615	
Dakhlet Nouadhibou	Nouadhibou	Nouadhibou	173,525	
Dakhlet Nouadhibou	Nouadhibou	Boulenouar	3,369	
Dakhlet Nouadhibou	Nouadhibou	Inal	183	
Gorgol	Kaedi	Kaedi	62,790	
Gorgol	Kaedi	Djeol	22,252	
Gorgol	Kaedi	Nere Walo	11,653	
Gorgol	Kaedi	Tufunde Cive	10,374	
Gorgol	Kaedi	Tokomadji	13,591	
Gorgol	Lexelba	Lexelba	17,415	
Gorgol	Lexelba	Betengal	6,297	
Gorgol	Lexelba	Ganki	11,250	
Gorgol	Lexelba	Talhaya	6,305	
Gorgol	Maghama	Maghama	22,551	
Gorgol	Maghama	Beileguet Litama	5,881	
Gorgol	Maghama	Daw	10,453	
Gorgol	Maghama	Dodol Cover	5,720	
Gorgol	Maghama	Sagne	13,322	
Gorgol	Maghama	Toutel	10,857	
Gorgol	Maghama	Vrea Litama	6,130	
Gorgol	Maghama	Waly Diantang	15,977	
Gorgol	M'Bout	M'Bout	16,813	
Gorgol	M'Bout	Chelkhet Tiyad	10,901	
Gorgol	M'Bout	Diadjibine Gandega	13,142	
Gorgol	M'Bout	Edebaye Ehl Guelay	13,735	
Gorgol	M'Bout	Foum Gleita	33,314	
Gorgol	M'Bout	Lahrach	11,917	
Gorgol	M'Bout	Souve	8,630	
Gorgol	M'Bout	Tarenguet Ehel Moul	9,936	
Gorgol	M'Bout	Tikobra	14,076	
Gorgol	Monguel	Monguel	7,081	
Gorgol	Monguel	Azgueilem Tiyab	17,266	
Gorgol	Monguel	Bokkol	14,232	
Gorgol	Monguel	Bethet Meit	9,146	
Gorgol	Monguel	Melzem Teichett	9,483	
Guidimaka	Ghabou	Ghabou	12,912	
Guidimaka	Ghabou	Baidiyam	12,693	
Guidimaka	Ghabou	Chleikha	16,852	
Guidimaka	Ghabou	Diogountourou	24,833	
Guidimaka	Ghabou	Gouraye	35,021	
Guidimaka	Ghabou	Soufa	11,358	
Guidimaka	Sélibaby	Sélibaby	44,966	
Guidimaka	Sélibaby	Hassichegar	24,667	
Guidimaka	Sélibaby	Ouldmbouni	10,412	
Guidimaka	Sélibaby	Tachott	19,073	
Guidimaka	Ould Yengé	Ould Yengé	10,491	
Guidimaka	Ould Yengé	Bouanze	11,457	
Guidimaka	Ould Yengé	Bouly	20,484	
Guidimaka	Ould Yengé	Dafor	21,190	
Guidimaka	Ould Yengé	Lahraj	10,324	
Guidimaka	Ould Yengé	Leweynatt	5,993	
Guidimaka	Ould Yengé	Tektaka	12,643	
Guidimaka	Wompou	Woumpou	8,611	
Guidimaka	Wompou	Agouanitt	9,319	
Guidimaka	Wompou	Ajar	9,458	
Guidimaka	Wompou	Arr	22,144	
Guidimaka	Wompou	Sangué Diéri	8,174	
Hodh Ech Chargui	Adel Bagrou	Adel Bagrou	37,048	
Hodh Ech Chargui	Adel Bagrou	Elmasgoul Lebyadh	20,787	
Hodh Ech Chargui	Adel Bagrou	Sivane	15,020	
Hodh Ech Chargui	Amourj	Amourj	9,604	
Hodh Ech Chargui	Amourj	Bougadoum	16,099	
Hodh Ech Chargui	Amourj	Dieigui	20,949	
Hodh Ech Chargui	Amourj	Legdour	8,586	
Hodh Ech Chargui	Amourj	Oum Eacheiche	22,910	
Hodh Ech Chargui	Bassikounou	Bassiknou	21,252	
Hodh Ech Chargui	Bassikounou	Dhar	7,345	
Hodh Ech Chargui	Bassikounou	El Megve	15,232	
Hodh Ech Chargui	Bassikounou	Fassala	79,508	
Hodh Ech Chargui	Djigueni	Djiguenni	22,101	
Hodh Ech Chargui	Djigueni	Aoueinat Zbel	14,227	
Hodh Ech Chargui	Djigueni	Benamane	7,034	
Hodh Ech Chargui	Djigueni	Mabrouk	12,111	
Hodh Ech Chargui	Djigueni	Feireni	14,526	
Hodh Ech Chargui	Djigueni	Ghlig Ehel Boye	8,928	
Hodh Ech Chargui	Djigueni	Ksar el Barka	12,678	
Hodh Ech Chargui	Néma	Néma	35,042	
Hodh Ech Chargui	Néma	Achemine	3,298	
Hodh Ech Chargui	Néma	Agoueinit	12,410	
Hodh Ech Chargui	Néma	Bangou	13,672	
Hodh Ech Chargui	Néma	Beribavatt	5,974	
Hodh Ech Chargui	Néma	Mabrouk	6,916	
Hodh Ech Chargui	Néma	Hassi Attilla	7,397	
Hodh Ech Chargui	Néma	Jreif	6,031	
Hodh Ech Chargui	Néma	Noual	5,609	
Hodh Ech Chargui	Néma	Oum Avnadech	25,059	
Hodh Ech Chargui	Oualata	Oualata	4,782	
Hodh Ech Chargui	Oualata	N'Beiket Lehwach	12,652	
Hodh Ech Chargui	Oualata	Nouawdar	8,060	
Hodh Ech Chargui	Timbedra	Timbedra	34,244	
Hodh Ech Chargui	Timbedra	Bousteila	29,067	
Hodh Ech Chargui	Timbedra	Hassimhadi	15,624	
Hodh Ech Chargui	Timbedra	Koumbi Saleh	15,084	
Hodh Ech Chargui	Timbedra	Touil	18,777	
Hodh El Gharbi	Ayoun el Atrous	Ayoun el Atrous	36,517	
Hodh El Gharbi	Ayoun el Atrous	Beneamane	3,000	
Hodh El Gharbi	Ayoun el Atrous	Doueirara	14,542	
Hodh El Gharbi	Ayoun el Atrous	Egjert	5,567	
Hodh El Gharbi	Ayoun el Atrous	N'Savenni	4,279	
Hodh El Gharbi	Ayoun el Atrous	Oum Lahyad	11,466	
Hodh El Gharbi	Ayoun el Atrous	Ten Hamadi	2,858	
Hodh El Gharbi	Kobenni	Kobenni	19,250	
Hodh El Gharbi	Kobenni	Gogui	20,553	
Hodh El Gharbi	Kobenni	Hassi Ehel Ahmed Bechna	15,517	
Hodh El Gharbi	Kobenni	Leghligue	16,051	
Hodh El Gharbi	Kobenni	Modibougou	23,410	
Hodh El Gharbi	Kobenni	Timzinn	19,193	
Hodh El Gharbi	Kobenni	Voulaniya	21,184	
Hodh El Gharbi	Tamchakett	Tamchakett	4,996	
Hodh El Gharbi	Tamchakett	Guateidoume	10,992	
Hodh El Gharbi	Tamchakett	Mabrouk	3,030	
Hodh El Gharbi	Tamchakett	Radhi	9,731	
Hodh El Gharbi	Tamchakett	Sava	15,187	
Hodh El Gharbi	Tintane	Tintane	35,995	
Hodh El Gharbi	Tintane	Ain Varba	16,260	
Hodh El Gharbi	Tintane	Aweintat	13,705	
Hodh El Gharbi	Tintane	Devaa	15,844	
Hodh El Gharbi	Tintane	Agharghar	11,293	
Hodh El Gharbi	Tintane	Hassi Abdallah	5,091	
Hodh El Gharbi	Touil	Touil	12,359	
Hodh El Gharbi	Touil	Baghdad	14,221	
Hodh El Gharbi	Touil	Lehreijat	11,172	
Hodh El Gharbi	Touil	Sett	9,827	
Inchiri	Akjoujt	Akjoujt	18,138	
Inchiri	Benichab	Benichab	9,244	
Inchiri	Benichab	Mhayjratt	2,102	
Nouakchott	Nouakchott Nord	Dar Naim	186,925	
Nouakchott	Nouakchott Nord	Teyarett	123,658	
Nouakchott	Nouakchott Nord	Toujounine	303,882	
Nouakchott	Nouakchott Ouest	Ksar	57,758	
Nouakchott	Nouakchott Ouest	Sebkha	72,181	
Nouakchott	Nouakchott Ouest	Tevragh Zeina	74,942	
Nouakchott	Nouakchott Sud	Arafat	216,919	
Nouakchott	Nouakchott Sud	El Mina	181,640	
Nouakchott	Nouakchott Sud	Riyad	228,856	
Tagant	Moudjeria	Moudjeria	3,004	
Tagant	Moudjeria	Nbeika	30,545	
Tagant	Moudjeria	Soudoud	24,387	
Tagant	Tichit	Tichit	3,331	
Tagant	Tichit	Lekhcheb	1,159	
Tagant	Tidjikja	Tidjikja	19,386	
Tagant	Tidjikja	Boubacar Ben Amer	10,469	
Tagant	Tidjikja	Lehseira	4,389	
Tagant	Tidjikja	Tensigh	9,595	
Tagant	Tidjikja	Wahatt	8,495	
Tiris Zemmour	Bir Moghrein	Bir Moghrein	5,126	
Tiris Zemmour	Fderîck	Fderîck	11,623	
Tiris Zemmour	Zouérat	Zouérat	62,380	
Trarza	Boutilimit	Boutilimit	32,347	
Trarza	Boutilimit	Ajoueir	3,984	
Trarza	Boutilimit	Elb Adress	2,598	
Trarza	Boutilimit	El Mouyessar	1,625	
Trarza	Boutilimit	Nebaghia	8,220	
Trarza	Boutilimit	Nteichitt	10,760	
Trarza	Boutilimit	Tinghadej	7,465	
Trarza	Keur-macen	Keur-Macene	6,272	
Trarza	Keur-macen	Mbalal	18,290	
Trarza	Keur-macen	Ndiago	8,926	
Trarza	Mederdra	Mederdra	8,803	
Trarza	Mederdra	Boeir Tores	1,574	
Trarza	Mederdra	El Khatt	4,513	
Trarza	Mederdra	Taguilalett	2,559	
Trarza	Mederdra	Tiguent	17,659	
Trarza	Ouad Naga	Ouad Naga	11,987	
Trarza	Ouad Naga	Aouleiguatt	6,405	
Trarza	Ouad Naga	El Aria	6,213	
Trarza	R'Kiz	R'Kiz	17,871	
Trarza	R'Kiz	Bareina	19,954	
Trarza	R'Kiz	Boutalhaya	11,739	
Trarza	Rosso	Rosso	61,156	
Trarza	Rosso	Jidr el-Mouhguen	9,248	
Trarza	Tékane	Tékane	15,304	
Trarza	Tékane	Chemame	9,735	
Trarza	Tékane	Lexelba	15,635	
Trarza	Tékane	Teichetayatt	3,062	
Mauritania			4,927,532	
