= Sélibaby (department) =

- Department
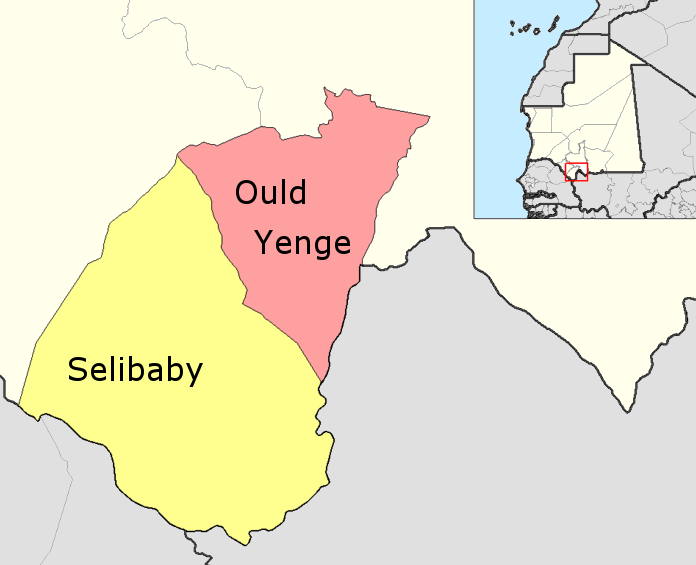

- Location within Mauritania
- Country: Mauritania

Area
  - Total: 7,252 km^{2} (2,800 sq mi)

Population (2013 census)
  - Total: 198,688
  - Density: 27.40/km^{2} (70.96/sq mi)

Sélibaby is a department of Guidimaka Region in of southern Mauritania.

== List of municipalities in the department ==
The Sélibaby department is made up of following municipalities:

- Hassi Cheggar
- Ould M'Bonny
- Sélibabi
- Souvi
- Tachott
- Arr
- Ajar
- Wompou
- Baydam
- Ghabou
- Gouraye.

In 2013, the entire population of the Sélibaby Department has a total of 198,688 inhabitants (97,232 men and 101,456 women).
