= Aftout (department) =

Coordinates: 16.65411°N 12.45289°W

Aftout باركيول
- Department
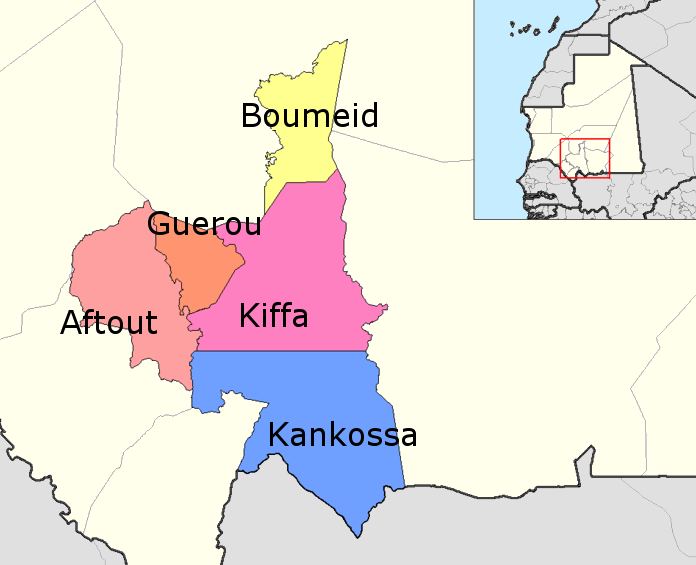

- Location within Mauritania
- Country: Mauritania

Area
  - Total: 6,460 km^{2} (2,490 sq mi)

Population (2013 census)
  - Total: 79,901
  - Density: 12.4/km^{2} (32.0/sq mi)

Aftout or Barkewol is a department of Assaba Region in Mauritania.

== List of municipalities in the department ==
The Aftout department is made up of eight municipalities:

- Barkeol
- Bou Lahrath
- Daghveg
- El Ghabra
- Gueller
- Lebhir
- Leouossy
- Rdheidhi.

In 2000, the entire population of the Aftout Department has a total of 79,901 inhabitants (36,210 men and 43,691 women).
