= Dafor =

Dafor دافور Dafore
- Commune and town
- Interactive map of Dafor
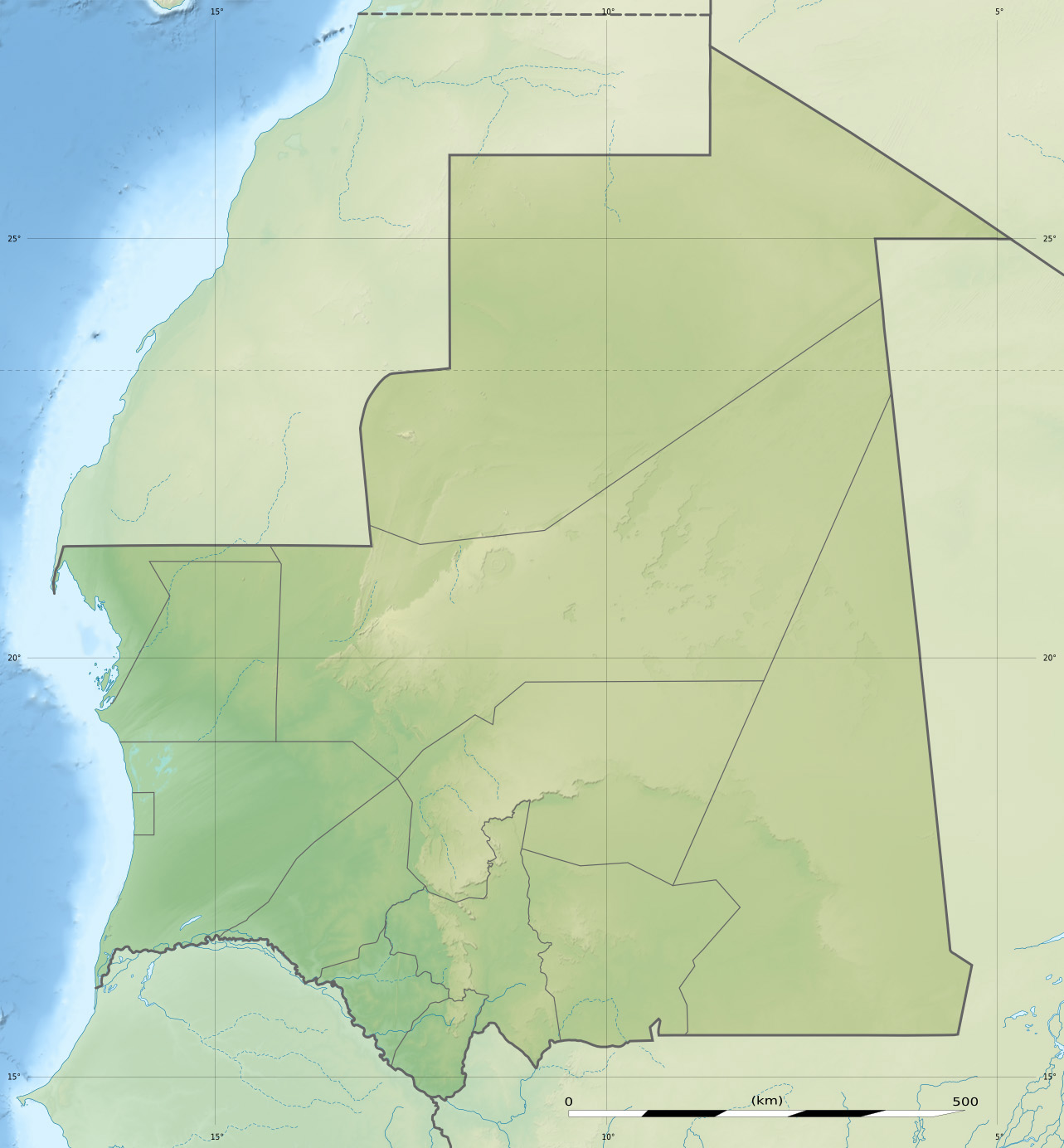
- Location in Mauritania Dafor (Africa)
- Coordinates: 15°39′20″N 12°08′41″W
- Country: Mauritania

Population (2013)
  - Total: 15,844
- Time zone: UTC±00:00 (GMT)

Dafor (or Dafort, Daffort, in Arabic: الدافوع) is a town and commune in Southern Mauritania, located in the Ould Yengé department of the Guidimaka Region.

== Geography ==
The commune of Dafort is located in the region of Guidimaka, in the south of Mauritania. It is positioned to the west in the department of Ould Yengé and covers an area of 276 km2.

It is bounded to the north by the commune of Bouanze, to the east by the commune of Tektaka, to the south by the commune of Bouly, to the west by the communes of Tachott and Ouldmbouni.

== History ==
Dafor was founded around 1905 by Sonin hunters, who settled the area because of the fertility of the surrounding land. The settlement developed in a region where access to fertile agricultural land, pasture, and water influenced the establishment of villages. Other settlements in the present-day commune were established between 1925 and 1980. Dafor was formally established as a commune by Ordinance No. 87-289 of October 20, 1987, which established the communes of Mauritania.

== Economy ==
Agriculture is at the center of Dafort's economy, like almost all the municipalities in the region. But this economy is fragile because it encounters obstacles to its development, in particular the climatic conditions or the lack of means of the farmers. To deal with these obstacles, the state or various NGOs finance projects that improve the living conditions of the inhabitants.

For example, a project to set up a drinking water network was launched in 2021 in the village of Lefkarine.
