= Djigueni (department) =

Djigueni جكني
- Department
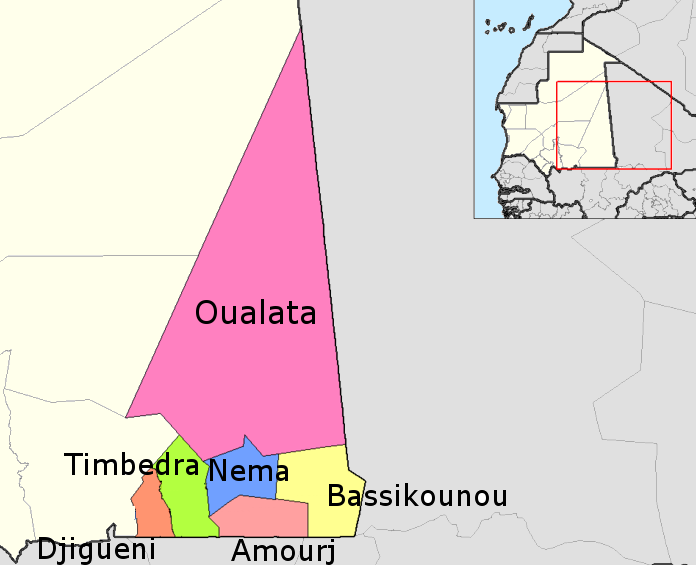

- Location within Mauritania
- Country: Mauritania

Area
  - Total: 5,234 km^{2} (2,021 sq mi)

Population
  - Total: 59,614
  - Density: 11.39/km^{2} (29.50/sq mi)

Djigueni is a department of Hodh Ech Chargui Region in Mauritania.

== List of municipalities in the department ==
The Djigueni department is made up of following communes:

- Aoueinat Zbel
- Beneamane
- Djiguenni
- El Mabrouk
- Feireni
- Ghlig Ehel Boye
- Ksar el Barka
