= Boutilimit (department) =

Boutilimit بتلميت
- Department
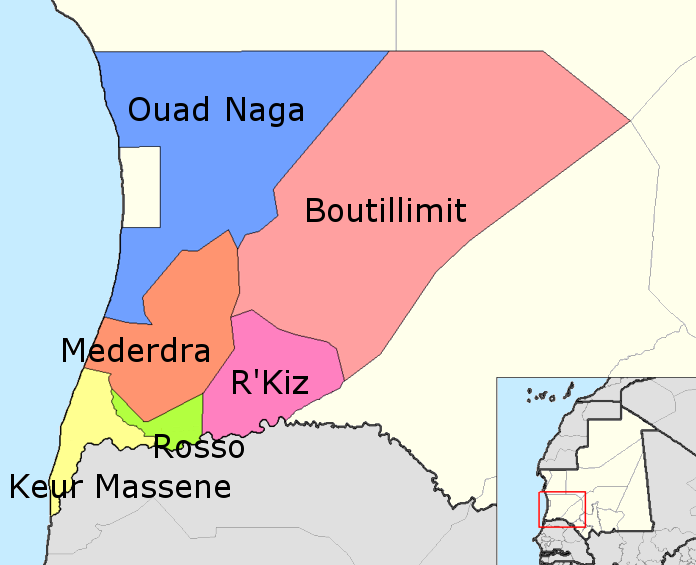

- Location within Mauritania
- Country: Mauritania

Area
  - Total: 32,509 km^{2} (12,552 sq mi)

Population (2013 census)
  - Total: 63,193
  - Density: 1.9439/km^{2} (5.0346/sq mi)

Boutilimit is a department of Trarza Region in Mauritania.

== List of municipalities in the department ==
The Boutilimit department is made up of the following communes:

- Ajoueir
- Boutilimit
- Elb Adress
- El Mouyessar
- Nebaghia
- Nteichitt
- Tinghadej
