= Ayoun el Atrous (department) =

Ayoun el Atrous لعيون
- Department
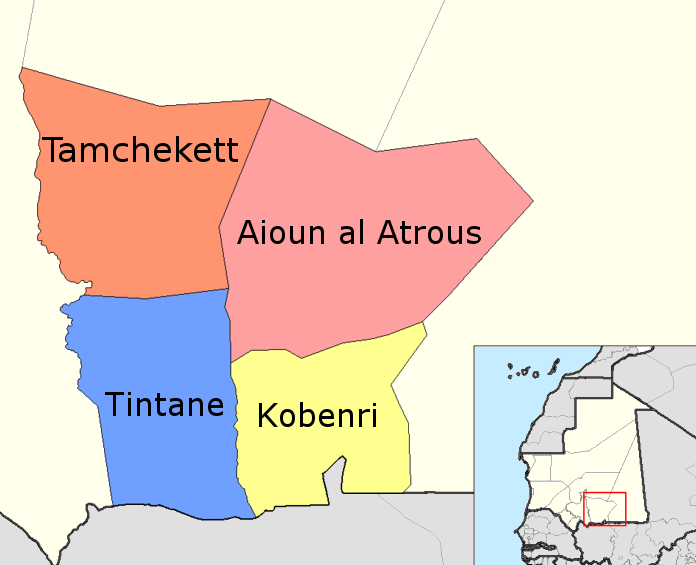

- Location in Mauritania
- Coordinates: 16°39′47″N 9°36′12″W
- Country: Mauritania

Area
  - Total: 6,852 sq mi (17,747 km^{2})

Population (2013 census)
  - Total: 65,237
  - Density: 9.5207/sq mi (3.6759/km^{2})

Ayoun el Atrous is a department of Hodh El Gharbi Region in Mauritania.

== List of municipalities in the department ==
The Ayoun el Atrous department is made up of following communes:

- Ayoun el Atrous
- Beneamane
- Doueirara
- Egjert
- N'Savenni
- Oum Lahyad
- Ten Hamadi
