= R'Kiz (department) =

R'Kiz اركيز
- Department
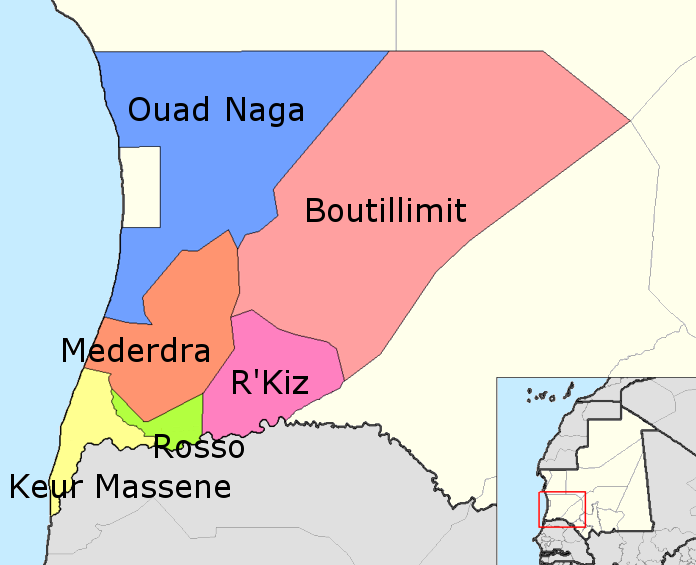

- Location within Mauritania
- Coordinates: 16.92181°N 15.23703°W
- Country: Mauritania

Area
  - Total: 1,096 sq mi (2,838 km^{2})

Population (2023 census)
  - Total: 49,564
  - Density: 45.23/sq mi (17.46/km^{2})

R'Kiz is a department of Trarza Region in Mauritania.

== List of municipalities in the department ==
The R'Kiz department is made up of following communes:

- Bareina
- Boutalhaya
- Lexelba
- R' Kiz
- Tékane
