= Melzem Teichett =

- Commune and village
- Location in Mauritania
- Coordinates: 16.5666°N 12.8090°W
- Country: Mauritania

Population (2023)
  - Total: 9,483
- Time zone: UTC±00:00 (GMT)

Melzem Teichett (ملزم تيشط) is a village and rural commune, in the Monguel Department of the Gorgol Region of Mauritania.

== History ==
Melzem Teichet was established as a commune by the ordinance of October 20, 1987, which created the communes of Mauritania.

== Geography ==
The commune of Melzem Teichet is situated in the north of the Gorgol Region and has an area of 464 square kilometres (179 sq mi).

It is bordered to the east by the communes of R'Dheidhi and El Ghabra, to the south by the commune of Azgueilem Tiyab, and to the west by the communes of Bakhel and Mal.

== Demographics ==
At the time of the 2023 General Census of Population and Housing (RGPH), the commune of Melzem Teichet had a population of 9483 people.

== Economy ==
Agriculture is central to the economy of Melzem Teichet, as it is for almost all communes in the region. However, this economy is fragile, facing obstacles to development such as climatic conditions and farmers' lack of resources. To address these challenges, the state and various NGOs fund projects aimed at improving the inhabitants' living conditions.
