= Diadjibine Gandéga =

Commune of Mauritania

Diadjibine Gandéga Arabic: انجاجبني
- Commune and village
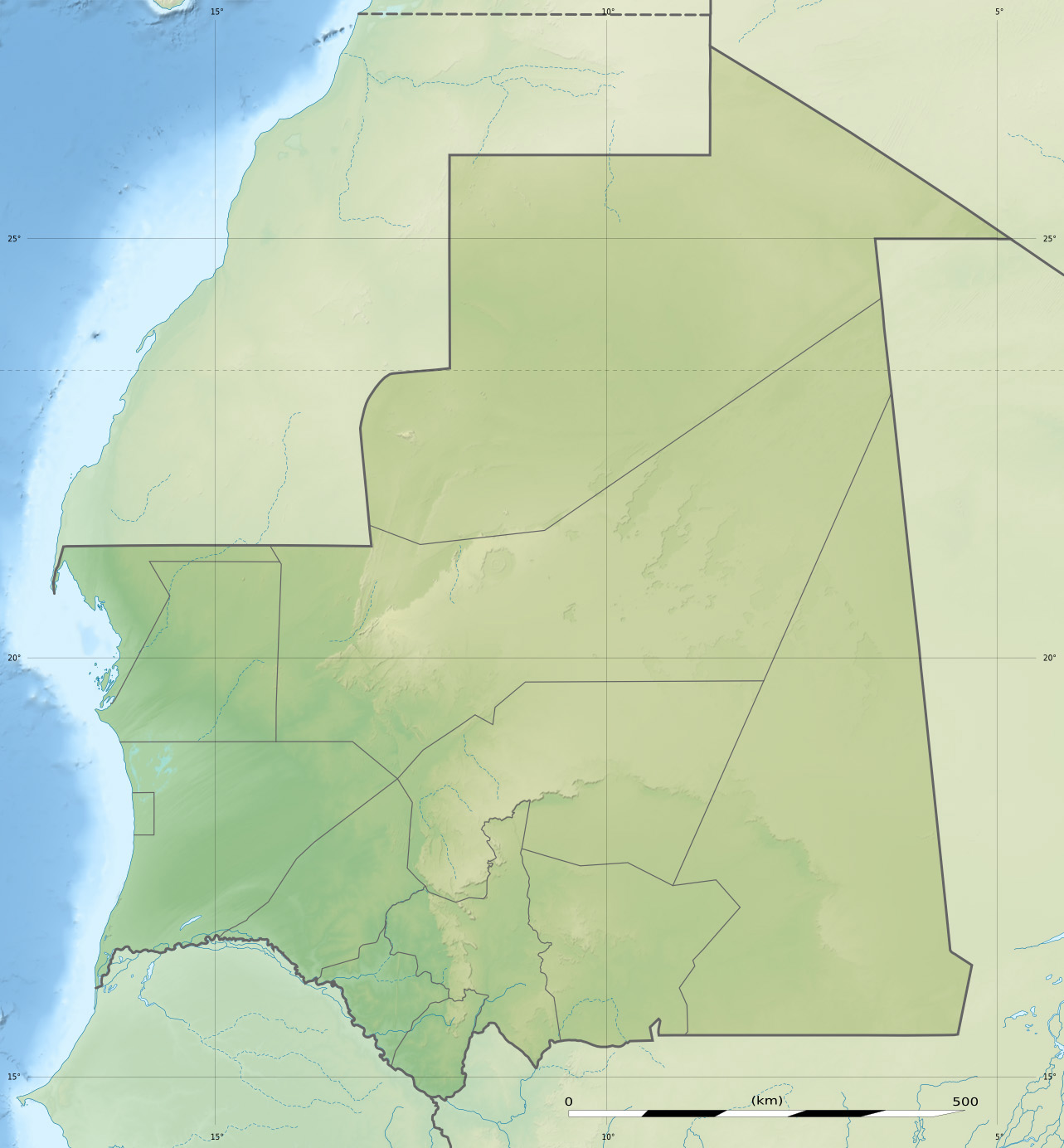
- Location in Mauritania
- Coordinates: 15.74884°N 12.48276°W
- Country: Mauritania
- Region: Gorgol
- Department: M'Bout

Government
  - Mayor: Abdou Yamadou Timera (2023-2028)

Area
  - Total: 148 sq mi (384 km^{2})

Population (2023)
  - Total: 13,142
- Time zone: UTC±00:00 (GMT)

Diadjibine Gandéga (Arabic: انجاجبني الشرفه), also written Njabni, N'Djabni etc. is a village and rural commune in Mauritania. As of 2013 it had a population of 10,597 people. In 2023, it had a population of 13,142.

== Geography ==
Diadjibine Gandéga is a commune in the M'Bout moughataa (department), one of four departments in the Gorgol wilaya (administrative region). It is one of the nine rural communes that make up the M'Bout department. The sprawling district as a whole has more than 120,000 people.

The M'Bout region of southern Mauritania is in the Sahel. The climate is hot, with low rainfall of 150 to 350 millimetres (5.9 to 13.8 in) during the July-October rainy season and sparse vegetation. It has seen high levels of migration of workers to Nouakchott, West Africa, Europe and America in search of a better life.

Diadjibine borders the commune of M'Bout the north, Tarenguet Ehel Moul to the east, to the south east by Ouldmbouni and Ajoueir, and to the south and west by Edebaye Ehl Guelay.

== Events ==
The village of Diadjibine is run by the Gandéga, a Malinke people. It was founded around 1905 by Samba Mantchy Gandega. It is located on the Nouakchott-Sélibaby axis.

Diadjibine Gandéga was established as a commune by the ordinance of October 20, 1987, which established the communes of Mauritania.

In 1989 there were inter-ethnic massacres between Moors and Black Africans in Diadjibine, causing some Black residents to flee to Europe.

The Peace Corps gave a creative art workshop in Diadjibine in February 2003 to a group of ten boys and ten girls aged 12–18 years. For some of the students, this was the first time they had used colored pencils. The culmination was creation of a 4 by 18 feet (1.2 by 5.5 m) mural to be placed on a wall of the junior high school library, which was to be officially opened in April 2003.

In September 2007 the village experienced torrential rains, which caused more than 50 houses to collapse. The rains were said to be the most intense on record for one hundred years. Some families lost everything.

On 25 June 2024 Outouma Antoine Souleymane Soumare, presidential candidate, stopped in the village of Njabni, where he gave a detailed presentation of his electoral program to a group of the village residents.

== Sources ==
- "مقاطعىة امبود: حان الوقت لرفع سقف التمثيل الإداري (ولاية آفطوط الشرقي", Mauritania13 (in Arabic), 11 February 2017
- "رئاسيات 2024: المترشح اتوما انتوان سليمان سومارى يعقد مھرجانا انتخابيا في كيھيدي", Radio Mauritanie (in Arabic), 25 June 2024
- "Creativity in Life" A weekend of art and creativity in Diadjibine Gandega, Peace Corp
- "Le nom de vos chefs de villages", Soninkara (in French)
- Mazurier, Bruno (29 May 1998), "« S´il le faut, je retourne dans la clandestinité »", Le Parisien (in French)
- "Message de demande d'aide aux sinistrés de Diadjibiné Gandega", Carrefour de la République Islamique de Mauritanie (in French), 3 September 2007
- Wilaya de Gorgol (in French), Ministry of Culture (Mauritania)
