= Mederdra (department) =

Mederdra المذرذره
- Department
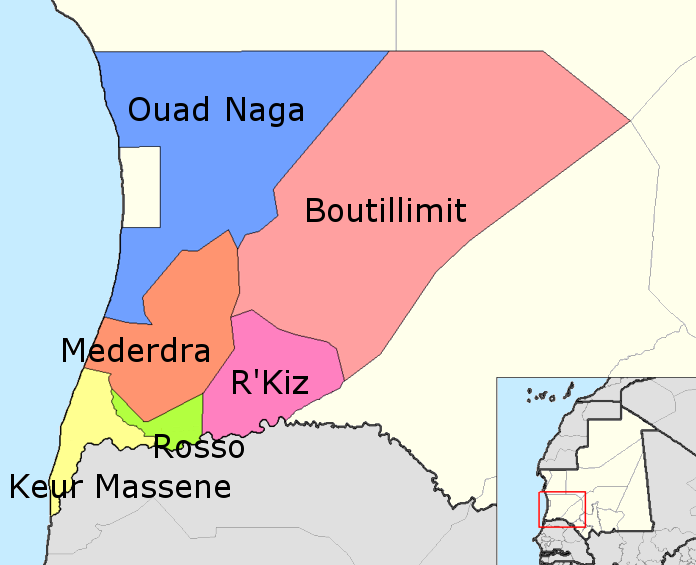

- Location within Mauritania
- Country: Mauritania

Area
  - Total: 6,473 km^{2} (2,499 sq mi)

Population (2013 census)
  - Total: 30,440
  - Density: 4.703/km^{2} (12.18/sq mi)

Mederdra is a department of Trarza Region in Mauritania.

== List of municipalities in the department ==
The Mederdra department is made up of the following communes:

- Boeir Tores
- El Khatt
- Mederdra
- Taguilalett
- Tiguent
