= Mabrouk =

Mabrouk or alternatively Mabrook (Arabic: مبروك, romanized: mabrūk), is a vernacular Arabic interjection meaning "blessed". It is also an expression for congratulation. It may refer to:

== Given name ==
- Ali Mabrouk El Zaidi, a Libyan long-distance runner
- Mabrouk El Mechri, Tunisian director, screenwriter and actor
- Mabrouk Mubarak Salim, State Minister of Sudan's Ministry of Transport and roads
- Mabrouk Zaid, Saudi Arabian football player

== Surname ==
- Ahmad Salama Mabrouk, Egyptian leader
- Alim Ben Mabrouk, Algerian footballer
- Belal Mabrouk, Egyptian handball player
- Del Mabrouk (born 1934), American contemporary poet, writer, photographer
- Hédi Mabrouk (1921–2000), Tunisian diplomat and politician
- Fathi Mabrouk, Egyptian football midfielder
- Juanita Mabrouk (1904–1999), American painter, and taxidermist
- Marwan Mabrouk, Libyan footballer
- Mehdi Mabrouk, Tunisian politician
- Mourad El Mabrouk, Tunisian basketball player
- Néjia Ben Mabrouk, Tunisian filmmaker
- Patrick El Mabrouk, French runner
- Saoussen Mabrouk, Tunisian politician

== Geography ==
- Mabrouk I, village in Mauritania
- Mabrouk II, village in Mauritania
- Mabroûk, Mali

== Other ==
- 1000 Mabrouk, 2010 Egyptian film
- "Mabrouk Aalik", a song in the album Bonjour
- Groupe Mabrouk, Tunisian company
