= Ould M'Bonny =

- Commune and village
- Location in Mauritania
- Coordinates: 15°40′11″N 12°22′20″W
- Country: Mauritania
- Region: Guidimaka
- Department: Sélibaby

Area
  - Total: 190 sq mi (492 km^{2})

Population (2013)
  - Total: 7,697
- Time zone: UTC±00:00 (GMT)

Ould M'Bonny or Ouldmbouni (Arabic: ولد امبني) is a village and rural commune in Mauritania. As of 2013 it had a population of 7697 people.

== Geography ==
The commune of Ould M'Bonny is located in the northwest of the Guidimaka region of southwest Mauritania, to the southeast of the town of M'Bout. It covers an area of 492 km².

It is bordered to the east by the communes of Bouanzé and Dafort, to the south by the commune of Tachott, to the southwest by the commune of Ajar, at its western tip by the commune of Diadjibine Gandéga, and to the northwest by the commune of Terguent Ehl Moulaye Ely.

The commune comprises fourteen localities: Ould M'Bonny, Ehel Maham, Ould Mboni Edebay, Hsey Laetach, Ehel Mohamed Ould Bowa, Agweir, Hassi Diogal, Chteiba, Thiénel Djibaya, Boki Aboudi, Wendou Gouma, and Betel.
