= Aoujeft Department =

Coordinates: 20°01′35″N 13°03′19″W

Aoujeft أوجفت
- Department
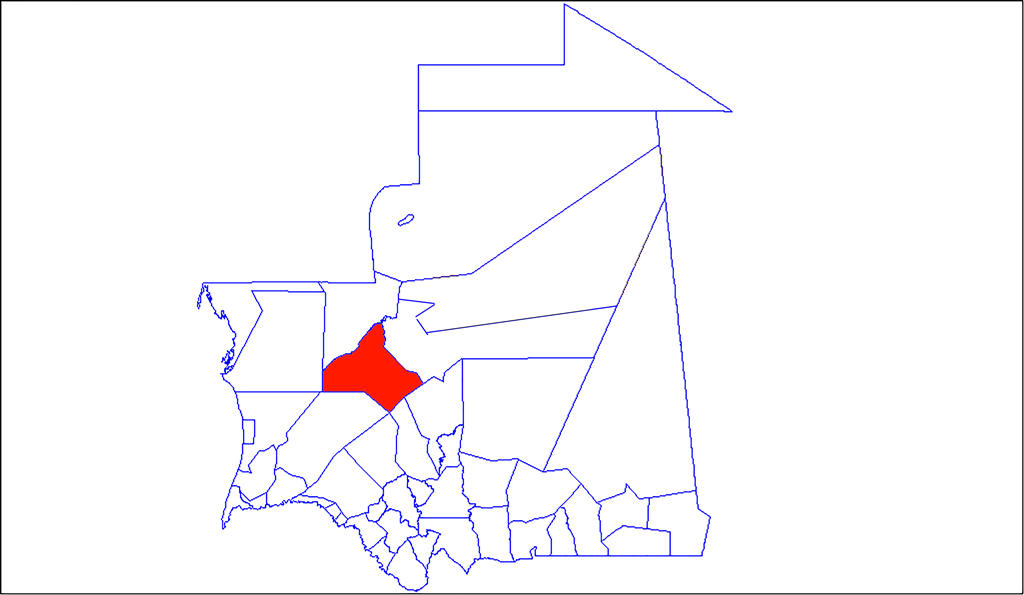
- Country: Mauritania
- Region: Adrar Region

Area
  - Total: 26,159 km^{2} (10,100 sq mi)

Population (2013 census)
  - Total: 12,997
  - Density: 0.49685/km^{2} (1.2868/sq mi)
- Time zone: UTC+0 (+0)

Aoujeft is one of the four departments (officially called moughataas) of the wider Adrar Region (the larger administrative division being called a wilaya), in western Mauritania. The capital lies at Aoujeft.

It is made up of four communes, the Agricultural Urban Commune of Aoujeft and the three rural communes of El Medah, Maaden with Terjit and N'Terguent. The total area is 24,556 km² and the population in the 2013 census was 12997, which had fallen from 20,181 in the 2000 census, a decline equivalent to 3.49% per year.

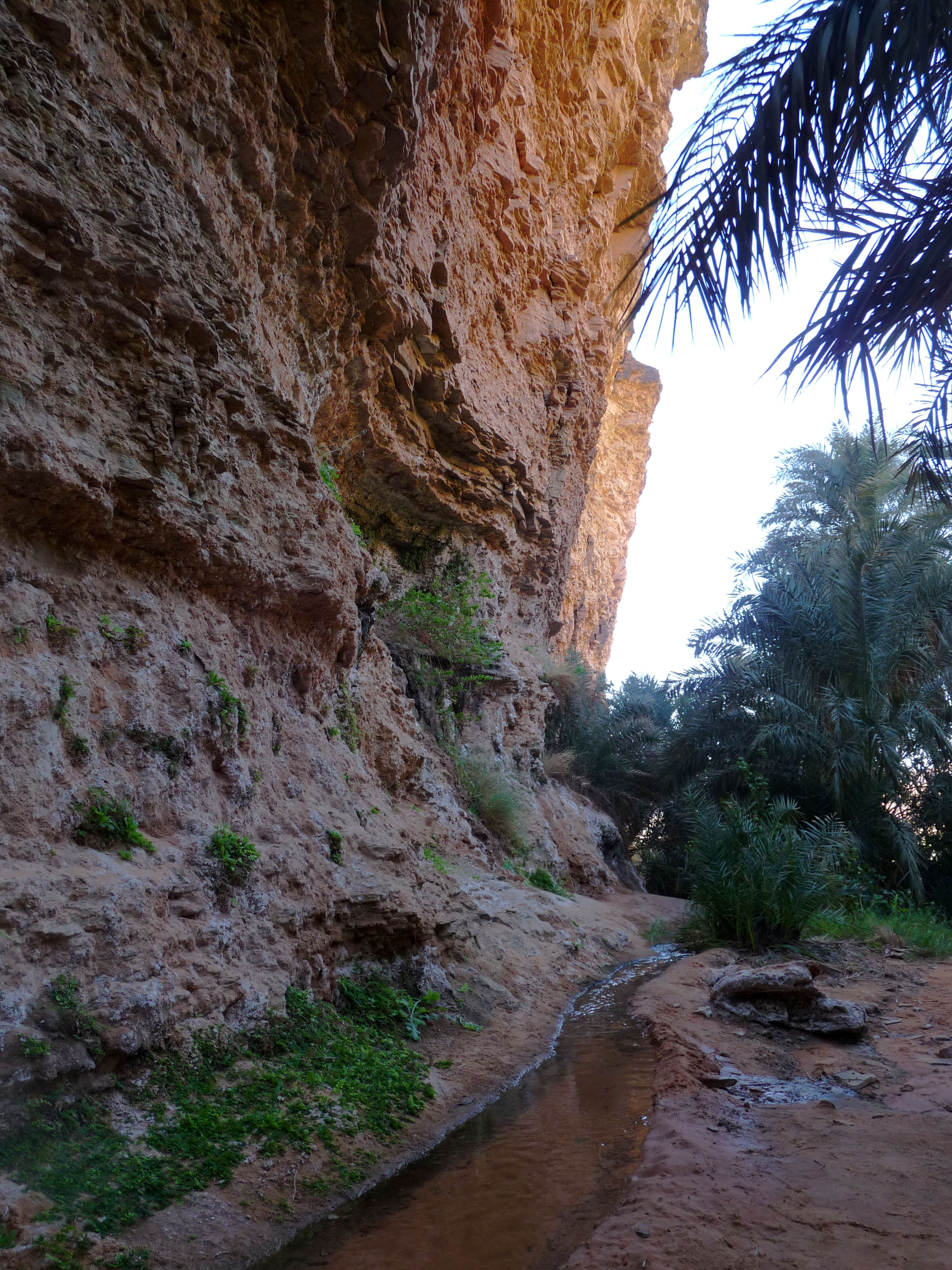
Tergit Oasis, Aoujeft Department

== Constituency ==
There isn’t really much information, but Aoujeft is also a constituency. In 2018 there were a total of 10,075 voters and only 1 seat in the Mauritanian “congress”.
