= Tidjikja (department) =

- Department
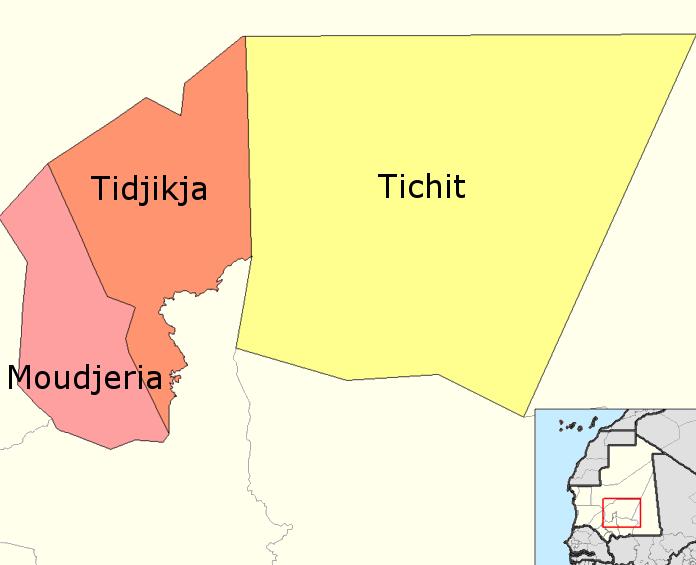

- Location within Mauritania
- Country: Mauritania

Area
  - Total: 19,199 km^{2} (7,413 sq mi)

Population (2013 census)
  - Total: 34,875
  - Density: 1.8165/km^{2} (4.7047/sq mi)

Tidjikja is a department of Tagant Region in Mauritania.

== List of municipalities in the department ==
The Tidjikja department is made up of following communes:

- Boubacar Ben Amer
- El Wahatt
- Lehseira
- Tensigh
- Tidjikja
