= Atar Department =

Coordinates: 20°31′N 13°03′W

Atar أطار
- Department
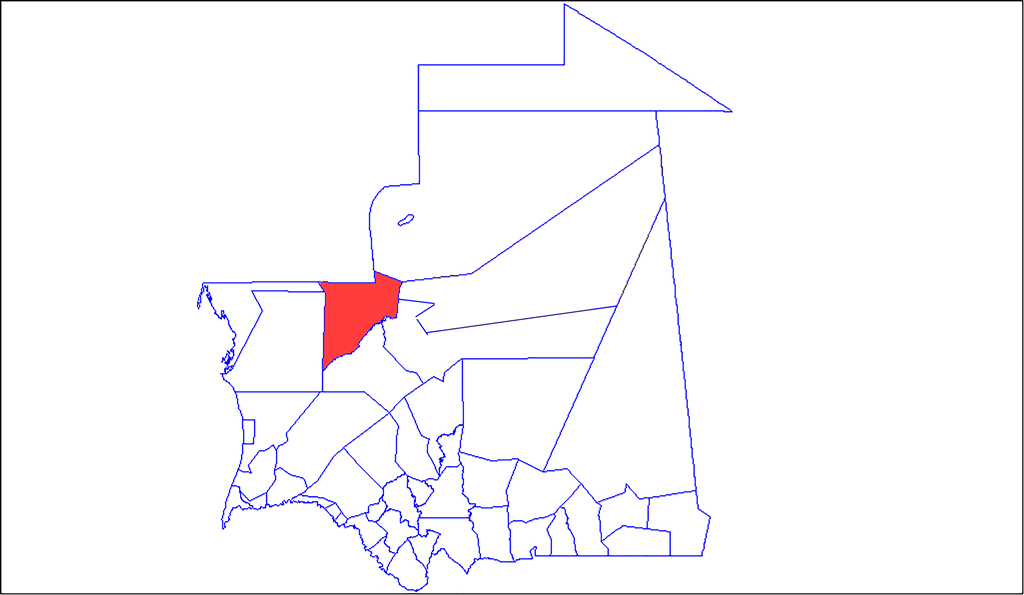
- Country: Mauritania
- Region: Adrar Region
- Capital: Atar

Area
  - Total: 26,250 km^{2} (10,140 sq mi)

Population (2013 census)
  - Total: 38,877
  - Density: 1.481/km^{2} (3.836/sq mi)
- Time zone: UTC+0 (+0)

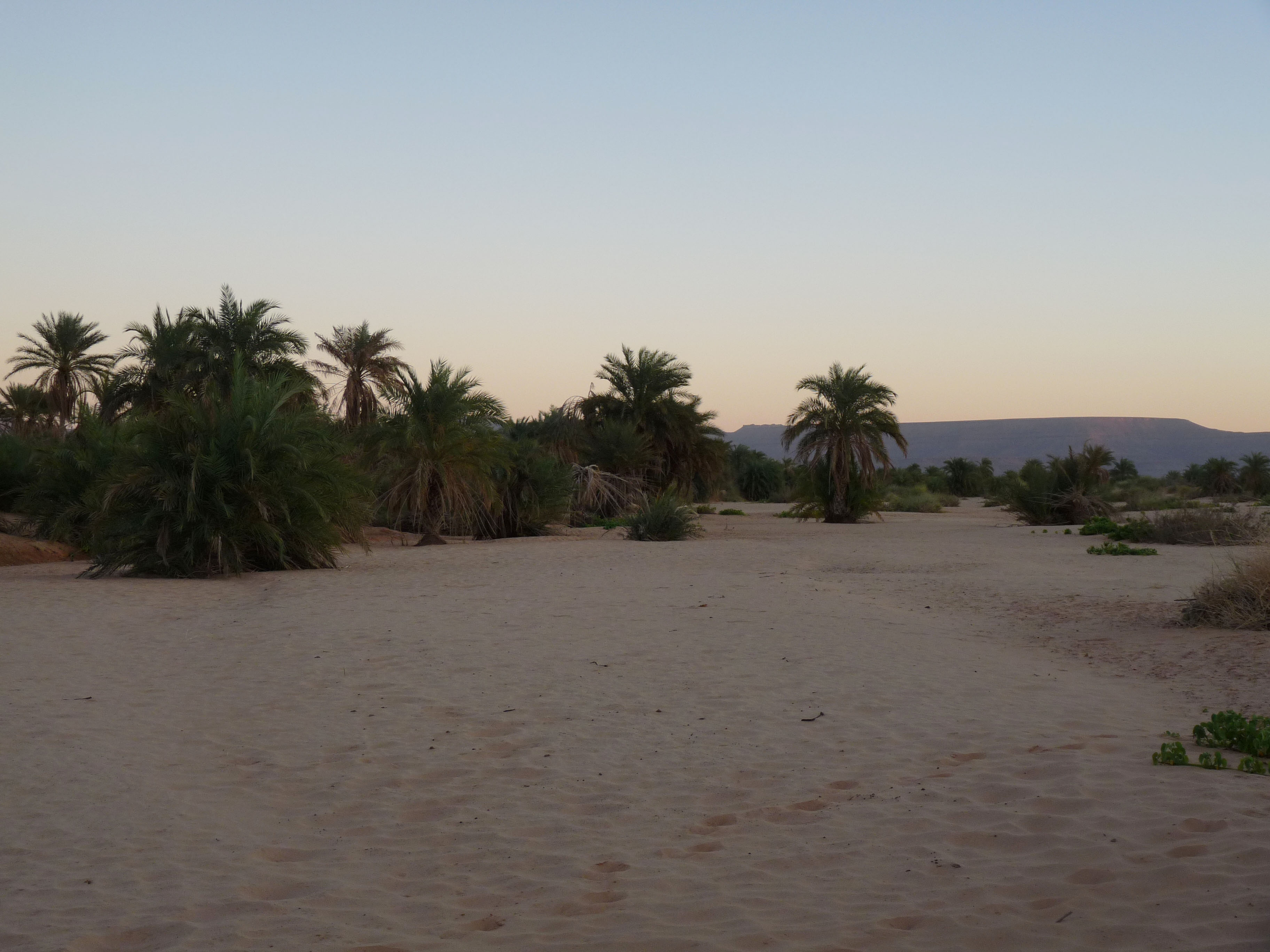
Palm trees near the town of Atar.

Atar is a department of the Adrar Region in western Mauritania. The capital lies at Atar. The other villages in the department are Ain Ehel Taya, Tawaz, Azougui and Choum.

== Constituency ==
The Atar constituency covers the same area as the department. In 2018 there were a total of 25,023 registered voters and they own 2 seats in the Mauritanian congress, It is the only constituency in Adrar region to own more than 1 seat in congress.
