= Boumdeid (department) =

Boumdeid بومديد
- Department
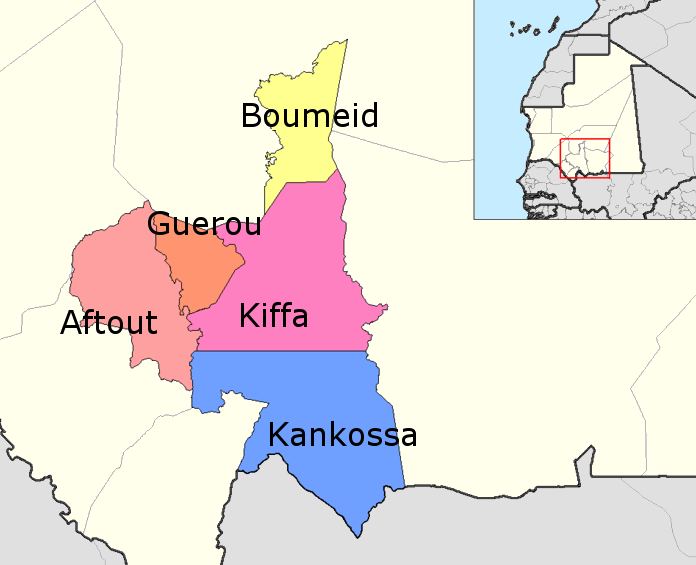

- Location within Mauritania
- Country: Mauritania

Area
  - Total: 4,320 km^{2} (1,670 sq mi)

Population (2013 census)
  - Total: 7,917
  - Density: 1.83/km^{2} (4.75/sq mi)

Boumdeid is a department of Assaba Region in Mauritania.

== List of municipalities in the department ==
The Boumdeid department is made up of following municipalities:

- Boumdeid
- Hsey Tin
- Laftah

In 2013, the entire population of the Boumdeid Department has a total of 7,917 inhabitants (3,860 men and 4,057 women).

== Constituency ==
Boumdeid Constituency occupies less area than the department. In 2018 there were a total of 31,419 registered voters and they have 1 seat in congress.
