= Dionaba =

- Commune and town
- Location in Mauritania
- Coordinates: 16°3′48″N 12°35′42″W
- Country: Mauritania
- Region: Brakna
- Department: Magta-Lahjar

Government
  - Mayor: Mohamed Ahid O/ Bouh Mohamed Bowba (PRDS)

Area
  - Total: 393 sq mi (1,018 km^{2})

Population (2013)
  - Total: 11,019
  - Density: 28.03/sq mi (10.82/km^{2})
- Time zone: UTC+0 (GMT)

Dionaba or Djonaba is a town and commune in the Brakna Region of southern Mauritania.

In 2013, it had a population of 11,019.
