= Monguel (department) =

Coordinates: 16°24′32″N 13°8′10″W

- Department
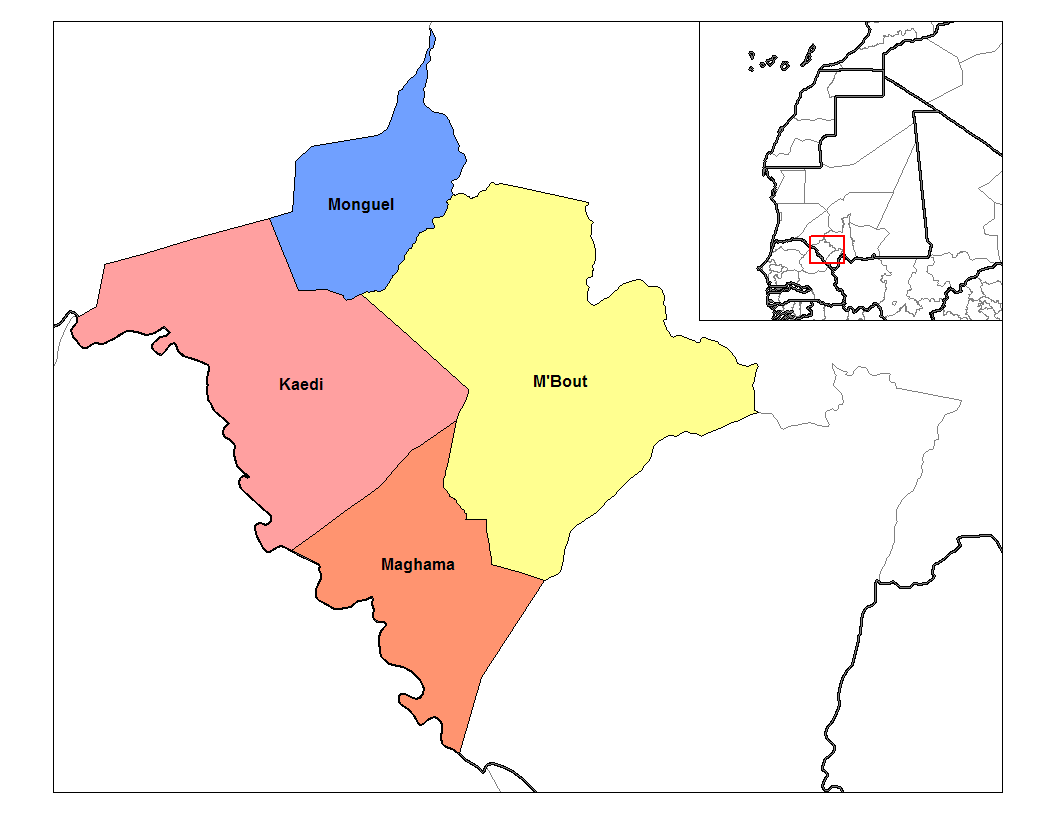

- Location within Mauritania
- Country: Mauritania

Area
  - Total: 1,745 km^{2} (674 sq mi)

Population (2013 census)
  - Total: 43,224
  - Density: 24.77/km^{2} (64.15/sq mi)

Monguel is a department of Gorgol Region in Mauritania.

== List of municipalities in the department ==
The Monguel department is made up of following municipalities:

- Azgueilem Tiyab
- Bethet Meit
- Bokkol
- Melzem Teichett
- Monguel

In 2013, the entire population of the Monguel Department has a total of 43,224 inhabitants (19,962 men and 23,262 women).
