= Magta =

Magta or Maguta may refer to:

- Magta people, or Ticuna, an ethnic group of the Amazon
- Magta language, or Ticuna, their language

== See also ==
- Magta-Lahjar, a town in Mauritania
