= El Ghaire =

Coordinates: 17°11′52″N 12°14′24″W

- Commune and town
- Interactive map of El Ghaire
- Country: Mauritania
- Region: Assaba
- Department: Guerou (department)

Population (2023)
  - Total: 13,279
- Time zone: UTC±00:00 (GMT)

El Ghaire is a town and commune in Mauritania.
