= Terjit =

Coordinates: 20.25°N 13.1°W

Terjit Tergit
- Oasis
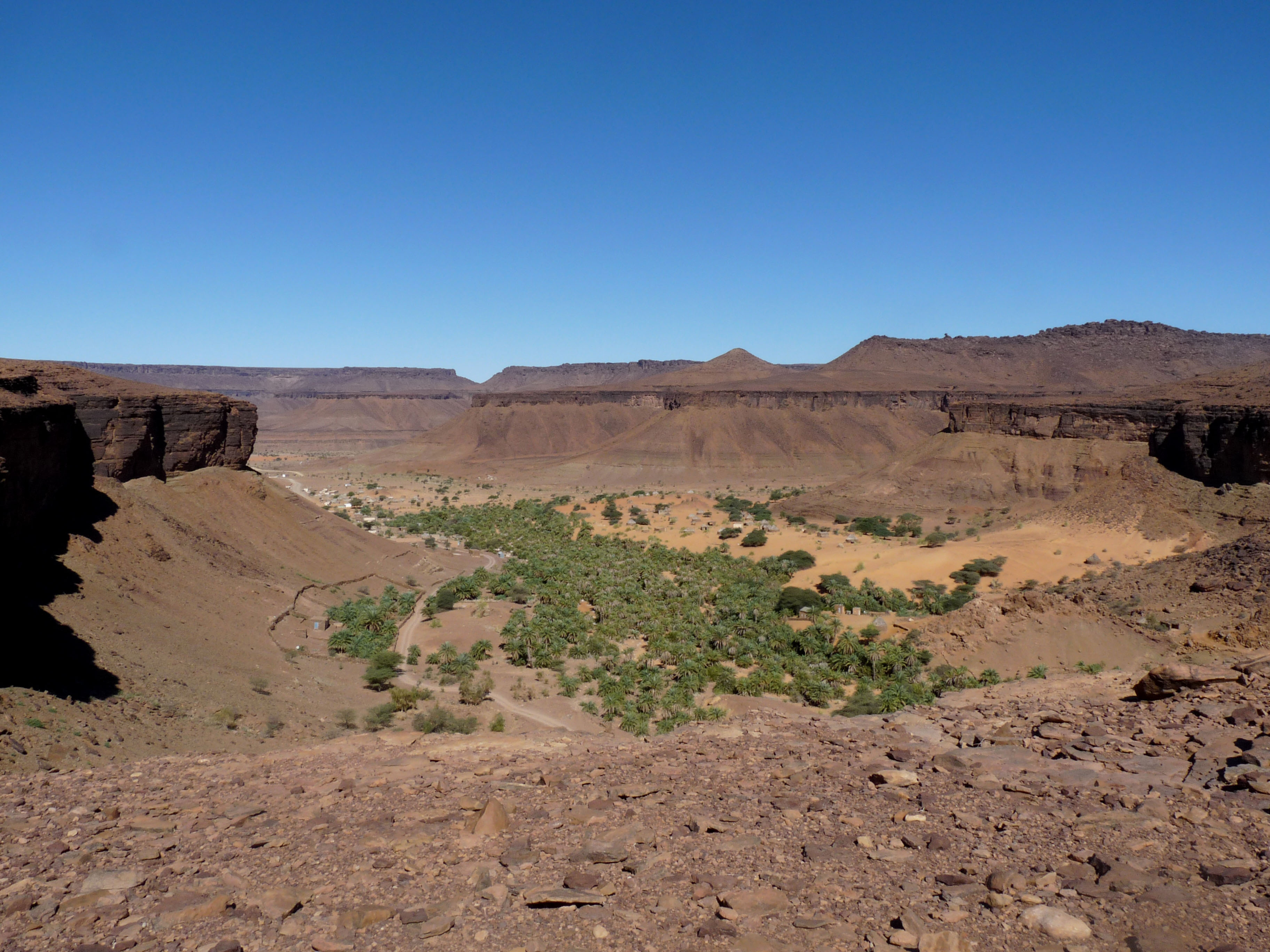
- The oasis of Terjit

- Location in Mauritania
- Country: Mauritania
- Region: Adrar Region
- Time zone: UTC+0 (GMT)

Terjit (Arabic: ترجيت) is an oasis (in the proper sense: a desert spring or other water source), 45km by road south of Atar and popular with tourists in Mauritania. It nestles in a gorge on the western edge of the Adrar plateau with the palm grove stretching a few hundred meters alongside a stream which emerges from a spring. Terjit is part of the commune of Maaden in the Aoujeft Department.

There is a modest fee to enter, and tourists can pay to stay in tents in the palm grove. It is often used for tourism for its charm, fresh water and shade.

Historically, it has been used for religious ceremonies, especially wedding ceremonies, as well as the coronation of a few African princes.

== Gallery ==
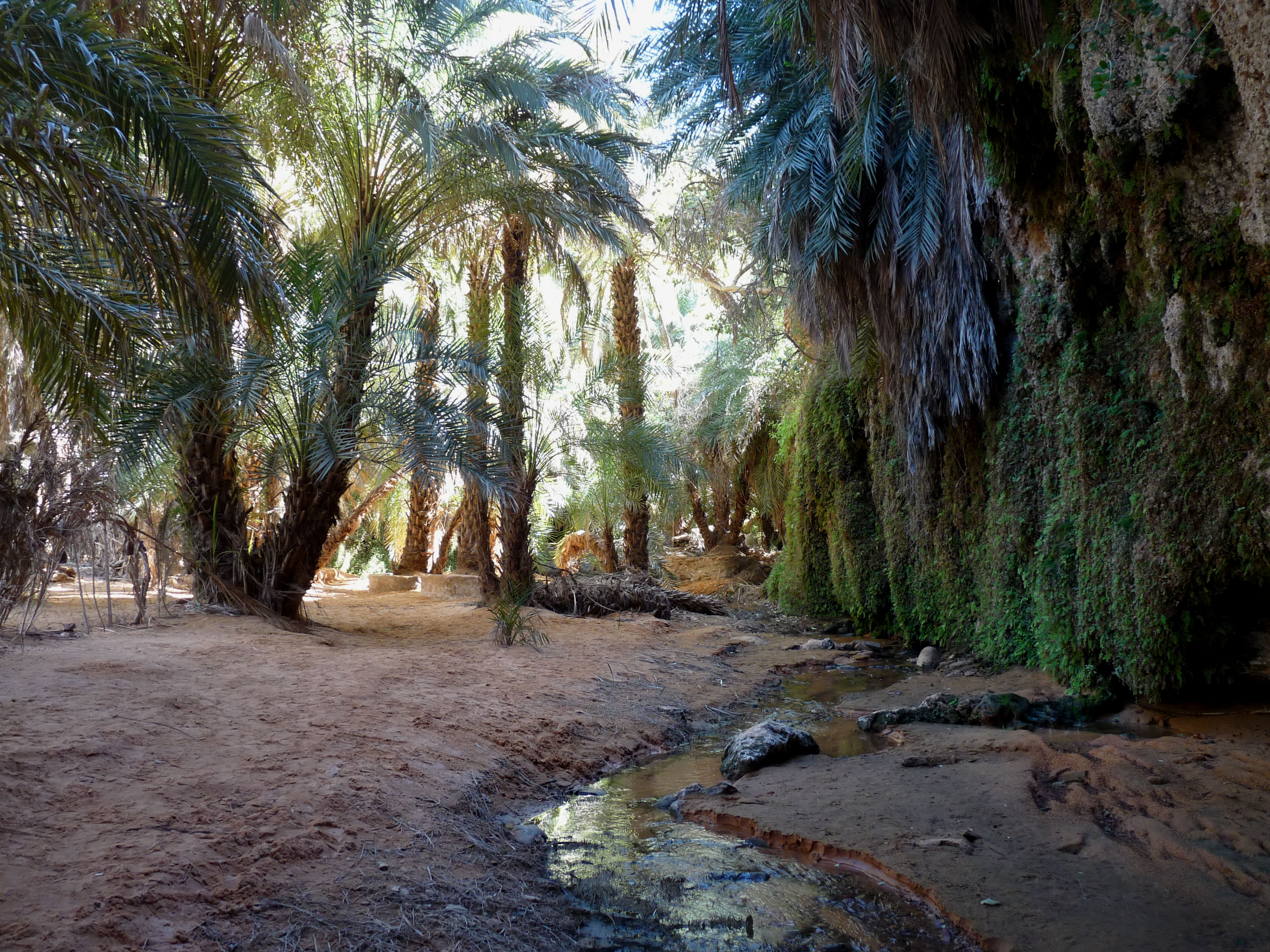
Freshness of the palm grove

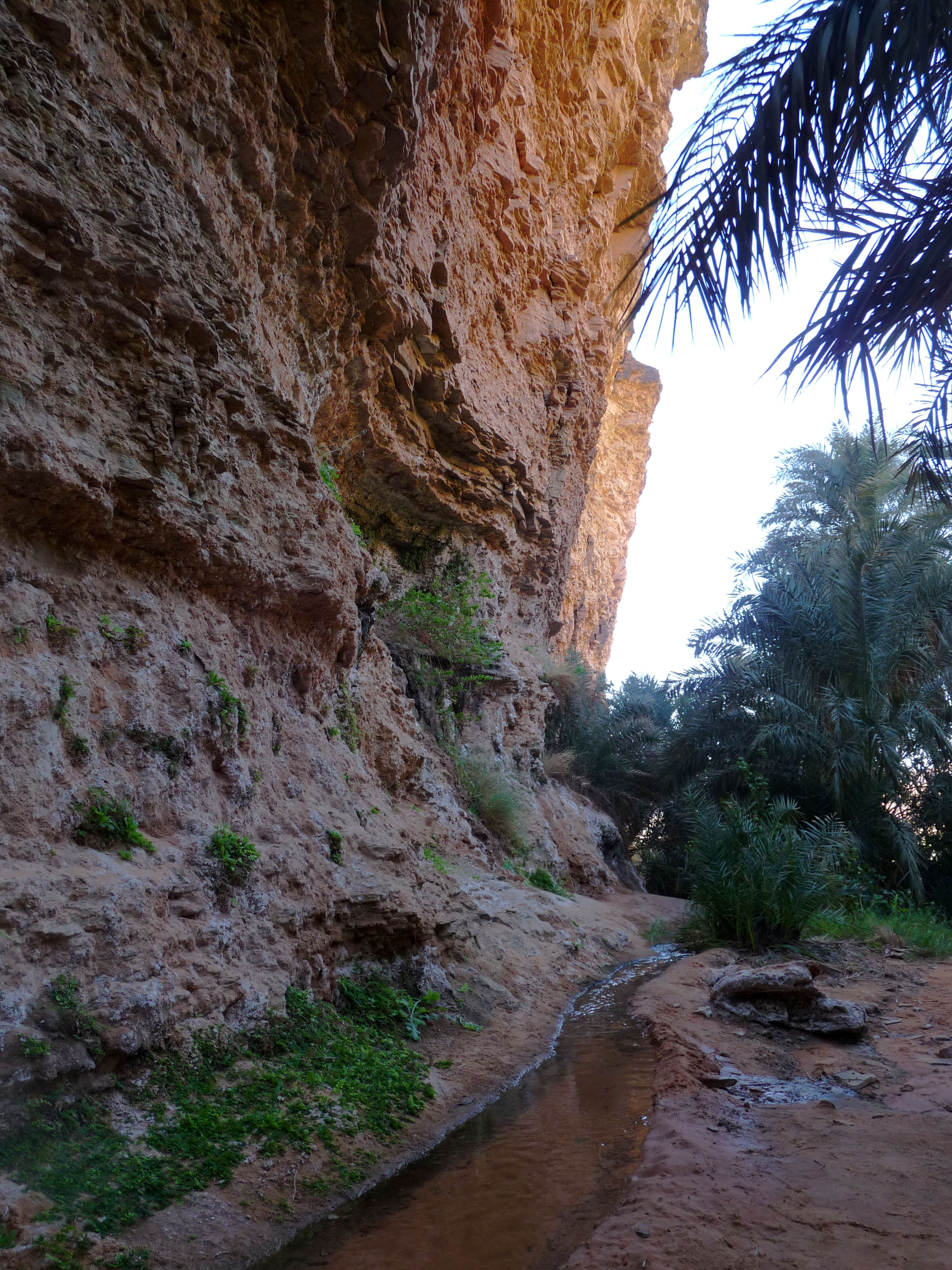
Steep cliffs

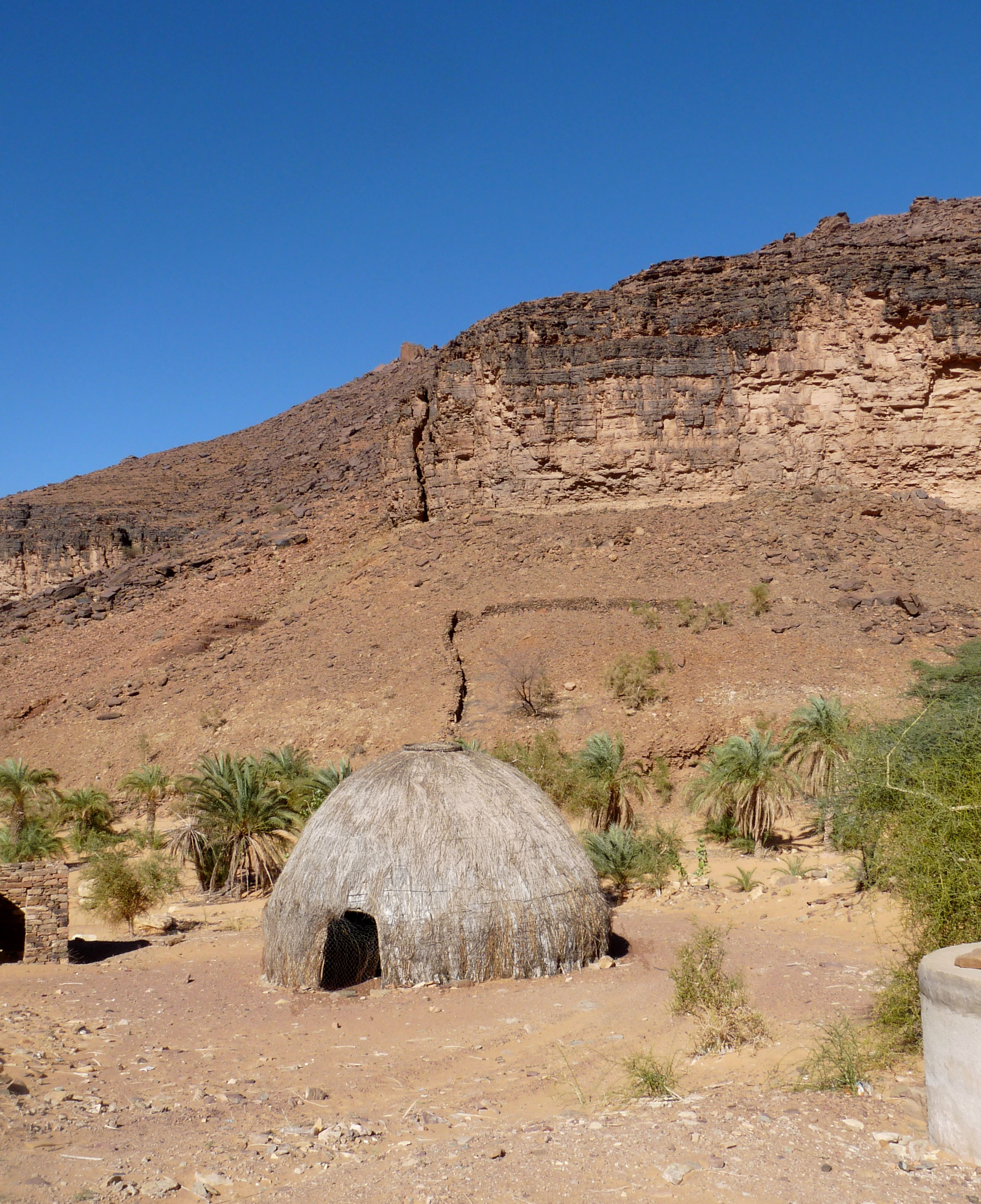
Tikitt

== Climate ==
Climate data for Terjit
Month	Jan	Feb	Mar	Apr	May	Jun	Jul	Aug	Sep	Oct	Nov	Dec	Year
Mean daily maximum °C (°F)	27.2 (81.0)	29.7 (85.5)	31.7 (89.1)	34.2 (93.6)	37.6 (99.7)	41.1 (106.0)	41.3 (106.3)	40.5 (104.9)	39.6 (103.3)	36.9 (98.4)	32.1 (89.8)	27.5 (81.5)	35.0 (94.9)
Mean daily minimum °C (°F)	12.8 (55.0)	14.0 (57.2)	16.2 (61.2)	18.5 (65.3)	21.5 (70.7)	25.5 (77.9)	26.1 (79.0)	26.2 (79.2)	25.4 (77.7)	22.3 (72.1)	17.6 (63.7)	13.4 (56.1)	20.0 (67.9)
Average precipitation mm (inches)	2 (0.1)	2 (0.1)	1 (0.0)	0 (0)	0 (0)	2 (0.1)	7 (0.3)	26 (1.0)	26 (1.0)	5 (0.2)	3 (0.1)	3 (0.1)	77 (3.0)
Source: Climate-data.org
