= Timbédra (department) =

Timbedra
- Department
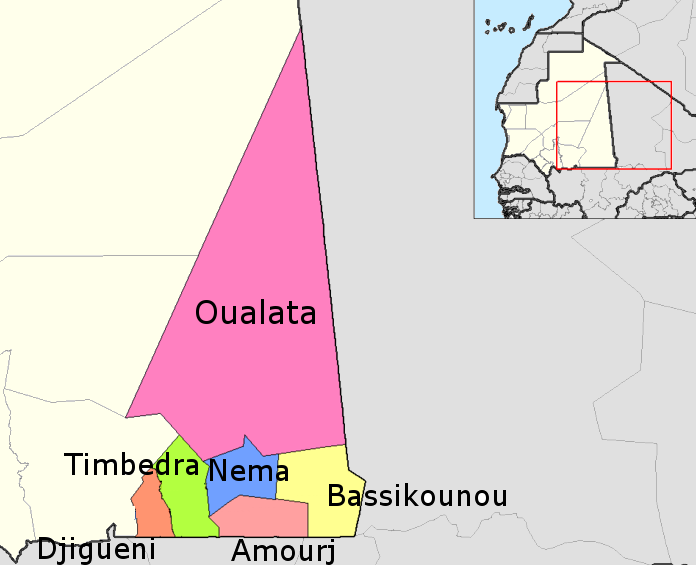

- Location within Mauritania
- Country: Mauritania

Area
  - Total: 11,407 km^{2} (4,404 sq mi)

Population (2013 census)
  - Total: 79,069
  - Density: 6.9316/km^{2} (17.953/sq mi)

Timbedra is a department of Hodh Ech Chargui Region in Mauritania.

== List of municipalities in the department ==
The Boutilimit department is made up of following communes:

- Bousteila
- Hassimhadi
- Koumbi Saleh
- Timbédra
- Touil
