= Mental health in Mauritania =

Up to 35% of Mauritanians may meet the diagnostic threshold for a mental health disorder.

Mental health in Mauritania encompasses the prevalence, treatment, as well as social and economic effects of mental illness in Mauritania. Mental health care is severely constrained in Mauritania by a lack of resources, as well as limited awareness on topics related to mental health. Furthermore, Mauritania does not have any stand-alone policy or legislation for mental health.

== Epidemiology ==
The most recent data on the prevalence of mental health disorders in Mauritania are from a survey conducted by the Ministry of Health, in collaboration with the World Health Organisation (WHO) in 2004, which found that 35% of those surveyed had at least one mental health disorder. Of those with a mental health disorder:

- 20% had an anxiety disorder
- 19% had a mood disorder
- 2.4% had a psychotic disorder

In 2019, the suicide mortality rate in Mauritania was 2.75 per 100,000 people.

== Treatment ==
Treatment options remain severely limited in Mauritania, with only one psychiatric ward in the whole country, located in the Nouakchott Centre for Specialised Medicine. This psychiatric ward only has 20 beds.

== Initiatives ==
In 2008, there was a campaign in Nouadhibou, Mauritania's second largest city, to raise awareness on mental health disorders, through the use of radio broadcasts and newspaper advertisements.

In 2025, a listening and psychosocial support space was opened in Timbédra, where individuals could talk about their problems in a safe environment.
