= Vatimetou Mint Khatry =

Mauritanian politician and economist

- Born: 1964 (age 61–62); Djiguenni

Vatimetou Mint Khatry is a Mauritanian politician and economist.

She was an official of the Ministry of Rural Development, working on various agricultural production study projects.

In 2002 she was appointed Deputy Director of the Ministry.

In 2008 she was appointed Minister responsible for the Promotion of Women, Children and the Family.

Following the coup in August of 2002, she resigned from the acting cabinet in protest at the military action, along with eight other ministers from Yahya Ould Ahmed Waghf's government.
