= Ouad Naga (department) =

Ouad Naga واد الناقة
- Department
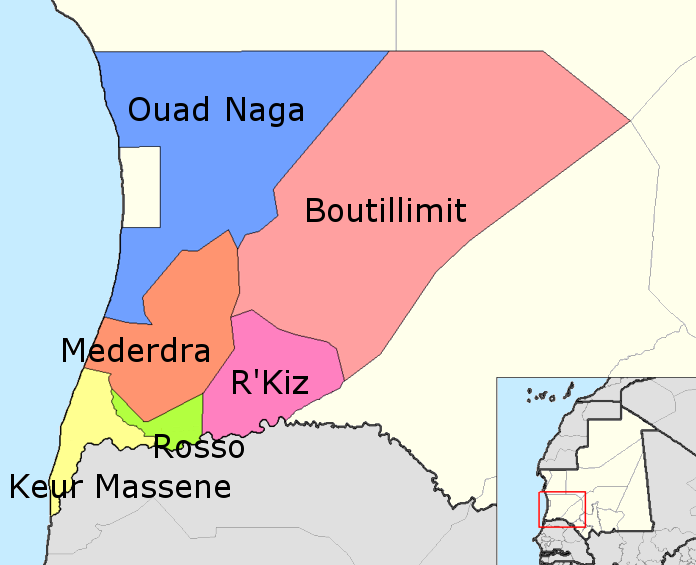

- Location within Mauritania
- Country: Mauritania

Area
  - Total: 21,684 km^{2} (8,372 sq mi)

Population (2013 census)
  - Total: 23,698
  - Density: 1.0929/km^{2} (2.8305/sq mi)

Ouad Naga is a department of Trarza Region in Mauritania.

== List of municipalities in the department ==
The Ouad Naga department is made up of the following communes:

- Aouleiguatt
- El Aria
- Ouad Naga
