= Gasra El Barka =

- Commune and village
- Country: Mauritania
- Time zone: UTC±00:00 (GMT)

Gasra El Barka, also known as Ksar el Barka is a village and rural commune in Mauritania. The town was founded in 1690.
