= Bababe (department) =

Bababe بابابي
- Department
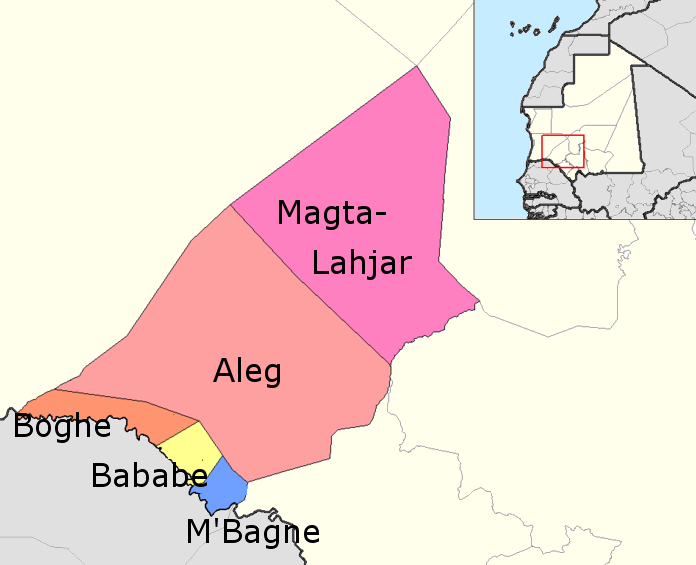

- Location within Mauritania
- Coordinates: 16°20′N 13°56′W
- Country: Mauritania

Area
  - Total: 1,196 km^{2} (462 sq mi)

Population (2013 census)
  - Total: 37,251
  - Density: 31.15/km^{2} (80.67/sq mi)

Bababe is a department of Brakna Region in Mauritania.

== List of municipalities ==
The Bababe department is made up of the following municipalities:

- Aéré M'Bar
- Bababé
- El Verea.

In 2013, the total population of the Bababe Department was 37,251 inhabitants (17,797 men and 19,454 women).
