= Magtar Lahjar (department) =

Magtar Lahjar مكطع لحجار
- Department
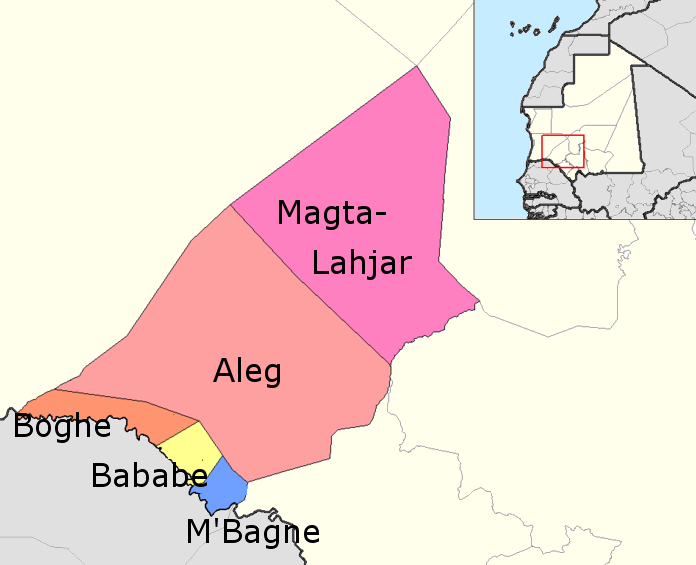
- Map of the departments of Brakna

- Location within Mauritania
- Country: Mauritania

Area
  - Total: 13,829 km^{2} (5,339 sq mi)

Population (2013 census)
  - Total: 57,672
  - Density: 4.1704/km^{2} (10.801/sq mi)

Magtar Lahjar is a department of Brakna Region in Mauritania.

== List of municipalities in the department ==
The Magtar Lahjar department is made up of the following municipalities:

- Djonaba
- Magta-Lahjar
- Ouad Emour
- Sangrave.

In 2000, the entire population of the Magtar Lahjar Department has a total of 47 288 inhabitants (22 338 men and 24 950 women).
