= Beribavatt =

Coordinates: 16.3666°N 7.6488°W

- Commune and village
- Interactive map of Beribavatt
- Country: Mauritania
- Time zone: UTC±00:00 (GMT)

Beribavatt is a village and rural commune in Mauritania. The United Nations High Commissioner for Refugees' staff reported from Beribavatt on the effects of climate change on Mali and Mauritania.
