= Nouamleine =

- Commune and village
- Country: Mauritania
- Time zone: UTC±00:00 (GMT)

Nouamleine , also spelled Nouamline, is a village and rural commune in Mauritania; it has a population of 6,123 as of 2023.
