= Sava, Mauritania =

Coordinates: 17°09′48″N 10°37′29″W

- Commune and village
- Interactive map of Sava, Mauritania
- Country: Mauritania

Area
  - Total: 801 sq mi (2,075 km^{2})

Population (2023)
  - Total: 15,187
- Time zone: UTC±00:00 (GMT)

Sava, Mauritania is a village and rural commune in Mauritania.

In 2013 it had a population of 13,864. In 2023, it had a population of 15,187.
