= Jreif =

Coordinates: 16°30′00″N 7°11′01″W

- Commune and village
- Interactive map of Jreif
- Country: Mauritania
- Region: Hodh Ech Chargui

Government
  - Mayor: Mohamed O/ Bouka (PRDS)

Population (2000)
  - Total: 4,401
- Time zone: UTC+0 (GMT)

Jreif is a village and rural commune in the Hodh Ech Chargui Region of south-eastern Mauritania.

In 2000, it had a population of 4401.
