= Nteichitt =

- Commune and village
- Interactive map of Nteichitt
- Country: Mauritania
- Region: Trarza
- Department: Boutilimit (department)

Population (2023)
  - Total: 10,760
- Time zone: UTC+0 (GMT)

Nteichitt or N' Teichet is a village and rural commune in the Trarza Region of south-western Mauritania.

In 2000, it had a population of 9,717. In 2023, it had a population of 10,760.
