= Beileguet Litama =

Coordinates: 15.6767°N 12.7440°W

- Commune and village
- Interactive map of Beileguet Litama
- Country: Mauritania
- Time zone: UTC±00:00 (GMT)

Beileguet Litama is a village and rural commune in Mauritania.
