= Lekhcheb =

Coordinates: 18°25′N 10°31′W

- Commune and village
- Interactive map of Lekhcheb
- Country: Mauritania
- Time zone: UTC±00:00 (GMT)

Lekhcheb is a village and rural commune in Mauritania. The population according to a census taken in 2013, recorded about 1,942 which consisted of 996 males and 946 females. The land area is 7,427 kilometres² with a population density of 0.2615 per km².
