= Dhar, Mauritania =

Dhar
- Commune and village
- Interactive map of Dhar
- Country: Mauritania
- Region: Hodh Ech Chargui

Government
  - Mayor: Sid’Ahmed O/ Eye O/ M’khaitir (PRDS)

Area
  - Total: 4,427 sq mi (11,466 km^{2})

Population (2013 census)
  - Total: 6,663
  - Density: 1.505/sq mi (0.5811/km^{2})
- Time zone: UTC+0 (GMT)

Dhar is a village and rural commune in the Hodh Ech Chargui Region of south-eastern Mauritania.

In 2013, it had a population of 6,663.
