= Guerou (department) =

Guerou كرو
- Department
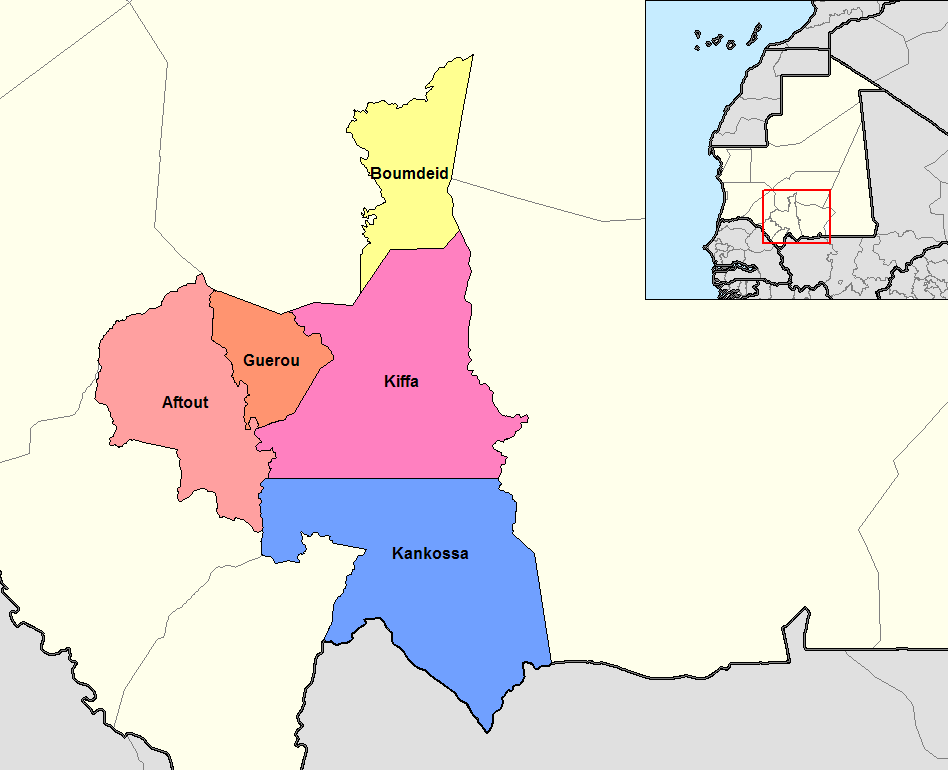

- Location within Mauritania
- Country: Mauritania

Area
  - Total: 2,717 km^{2} (1,049 sq mi)

Population (2013 census)
  - Total: 44,870
  - Density: 16.51/km^{2} (42.77/sq mi)

Guerou is a department of Assaba Region in Mauritania.

== List of municipalities in the department ==
The Guerou department is made up of following municipalities:

- El Ghayra
- Guerou
- Kamour
- Oueid Jrid

In 2013, the entire population of the Guerou Department has a total of 44,870 inhabitants (20,666 men and 24,204 women).

== Constituency ==
Guerou Constituency occupies the same area as the department. In 2018 there were a total of 25,757 registered voters and they have 2 seat in congress.
