= Ould Yenge =

Coordinates: 15.5404°N 11.7147°W

- Commune and town
- Interactive map of Ould Yenge
- Country: Mauritania
- Time zone: UTC±00:00 (GMT)

Ould Yenge is a town and commune in Mauritania.
