= Dodol Cover =

- Commune and village
- Country: Mauritania
- Time zone: UTC±00:00 (GMT)

Dodol Cover is a village and rural commune in Mauritania.
