= Oum Avnadech =

- Commune and village
- Country: Mauritania

Population (2023)
  - Total: 25,059
- Time zone: UTC±00:00 (GMT)

Oum Avnadech is a village and rural commune in Hodh Ech Chargui, Mauritania. In 2023, its population was 25,059.
