= Dielwar =

- Commune and village
- Interactive map of Dielwar
- Country: Mauritania
- Time zone: UTC±00:00 (GMT)

Dielwar is a village and rural commune in Mauritania.
