= Tiguent =

- Commune and town
- Location in Mauritania
- Coordinates: 17°15′N 16°0′W
- Country: Mauritania
- Region: Trarza
- Department: Mederdra (department)

Area
  - Total: 1,041 sq mi (2,696 km^{2})

Population (2023)
  - Total: 17,659
  - Density: 16.96/sq mi (6.550/km^{2})
- Time zone: UTC+0 (GMT)

Tiguent (Arabic: تكنت) is a small town and commune in south-western Mauritania, not far from the coast. In 2013, it had a population of 12,579. In 2023, it had a population of 17,659.

== Transport ==
It is proposed to be served by a new station on railway to serve the phosphate mines at Kaedi.

== See also ==
- Transport in Mauritania
- Railway stations in Mauritania
