= Ganki =

Coordinates: 16°13′N 13°14′W

- Commune and village
- Interactive map of Ganki
- Country: Mauritania
- Region: Gorgol
- Department: Lexeiba (department)

Population (2023)
  - Total: 11,250
- Time zone: UTC±00:00 (GMT)

Ganki is a village and rural commune in Mauritania.
