= Soudoud =

- Commune and town
- Interactive map of Soudoud
- Country: Mauritania
- Time zone: UTC±00:00 (GMT)

Soudoud is a town and commune in Mauritania.
