= Hassi Abdallah, Mauritania =

Hassi Abdallah
- Commune and village
- Country: Mauritania
- Time zone: UTC±00:00 (GMT)

Hassi Abdallah is a village and rural commune in Mauritania.
