= Nbeika =

Coordinates: 17°59′N 12°15′W

- Commune and town
- Interactive map of Nbeika
- Country: Mauritania
- Region: Tagant Region

Population (2013)
  - Total: 20,766
- Time zone: UTC±00:00 (GMT)

Nbeika is a town and commune in Mauritania, located in the Tagant Region.

As of the 2013 census, there were 20,766 inhabitants of Nbeika.
