= Agoueinit =

Coordinates: 16°43′N 7°33′W

- Commune
- Interactive map of Agoueinit
- Country: Mauritania

Population (2023)
  - Total: 12,410
- Time zone: UTC±00:00 (GMT)

Agoueinit is a rural commune in Mauritania. In 2023, its population was 12,410.

It is also the name of a neighbor town (Agounit) in Western Sahara, in the "Liberated Territories", controlled by the Polisario Front.
