= Hassi Attilla =

Coordinates: 16.2667°N 7.1667°W

- Commune and village
- Interactive map of Hassi Attilla
- Country: Mauritania
- Time zone: UTC±00:00 (GMT)

Hassi Attilla is a village and rural commune in Mauritania.
