= Lahraj =

- Commune and town
- Interactive map of Lahraj
- Country: Mauritania
- Time zone: UTC±00:00 (GMT)

Lahraj is a town and commune in Mauritania with a population of 0.
