= Boubacar Ben Amer =

- Commune and village
- Interactive map of Boubacar Ben Amer
- Country: Mauritania
- Region: Tagant
- Department: Tidjikja (department)

Population (2023)
  - Total: 10,469
- Time zone: UTC±00:00 (GMT)

Boubacar Ben Amer is a village and rural commune in Mauritania.
