= Noual =

Coordinates: 16°38′N 7°55′W

- Commune and town
- Interactive map of Noual
- Country: Mauritania
- Time zone: UTC±00:00 (GMT)

Noual is a town and commune in Mauritania.
