= N'Terguent =

N'Terguent نترغنت
- Commune
- Location in Mauritania
- Coordinates: 19°51′28″N 13°01′03″W
- Country: Mauritania

Population (2000)
  - Total: 2,573
- Time zone: UTC±00:00 (GMT)

N'Terguent or N'Teirguent is a rural commune in west-central Mauritania, located in the Adrar Region.

== Geography ==
It is part of the Aoujeft moughataa (department), to the south of Chinguetti and to the north of Moudjeria. The commune covers an area of 12,699 kilometres (7,891 mi).

== Demographics ==
As of 2000, N'Terguent had a population of 2,573 people, and as of 2023 it had a population of 1,636 people.

== Wildlife ==
A rare species of skink, Peters's banded skink (Scincopus fasciatus) has been documented in the communal area.
