= Boumdeid =

Boumdeid بومديد
- Commune and town
- Location in Mauritania
- Coordinates: 17°27′N 11°21′W
- Country: Mauritania
- Region: Assaba Region
- Department: Boumdeid Department

Area
  - Total: 57.5 sq mi (149.0 km^{2})

Population (2013 census)
  - Total: 3,189
  - Density: 55.43/sq mi (21.40/km^{2})
- Time zone: UTC±00:00 (GMT)

Boumdeid (Arabic: بومديد) is a town and commune in Mauritania. It is located in the Aoukar basin, which formerly gave name to the greater region. It has a population of 3,189 at the 2013 census. It is the birthplace of Mauritanian president Mohamed Ould Ghazouani.
