= Bousteila =

Bousteila بوصطيلة
- Commune and town
- Location in Mauritania
- Coordinates: 15°34′40″N 8°04′55″W
- Country: Mauritania
- Region: Hodh Ech Chargui
- Department: Timbedra

Population (2023)
  - Total: 29,067
- Time zone: UTC±00:00 (GMT)

Bousteila (Arabic: بوصطيلة) is a commune and town in Mauritania. It is located in the Timbedra department within the south-eastern region of Hodh Ech Chargui.

Mauritania's southern border with Mali is within 10 kilometers of Bousteila.
