= Ouad Naga =

- Commune and town
- Location in Mauritania
- Coordinates: 18°36′N 16°6′W
- Country: Mauritania
- Region: Trarza
- Department: Ouad Naga Department

Area
  - Total: 145.8 sq mi (377.5 km^{2})

Population (2023 census)
  - Total: 11,987
  - Density: 82.24/sq mi (31.75/km^{2})
- Time zone: UTC+0 (GMT)

Ouad Naga is a town and urban commune in the Trarza Region of south-western Mauritania.

In 2013, it had a population of 9,215. In 2023, it had a population of 11,987.

The biggest village in Ouad Naga other than the commune itself is Al-Agba.
