= Kamour =

Coordinates: 17°04′30″N 12°02′08″W

- Commune and town
- Interactive map of Kamour
- Country: Mauritania
- Region: Assaba
- Department: Guerou (department)

Area
  - Total: 385.9 sq mi (999.4 km^{2})

Population (2023)
  - Total: 10,717
  - Density: 27.77/sq mi (10.72/km^{2})
- Time zone: UTC±00:00 (GMT)

Kamour is a town and commune in Mauritania.
