= Chinguetti Department =

Coordinates: 20°27′N 12°21′W

Chinguetti
- Department
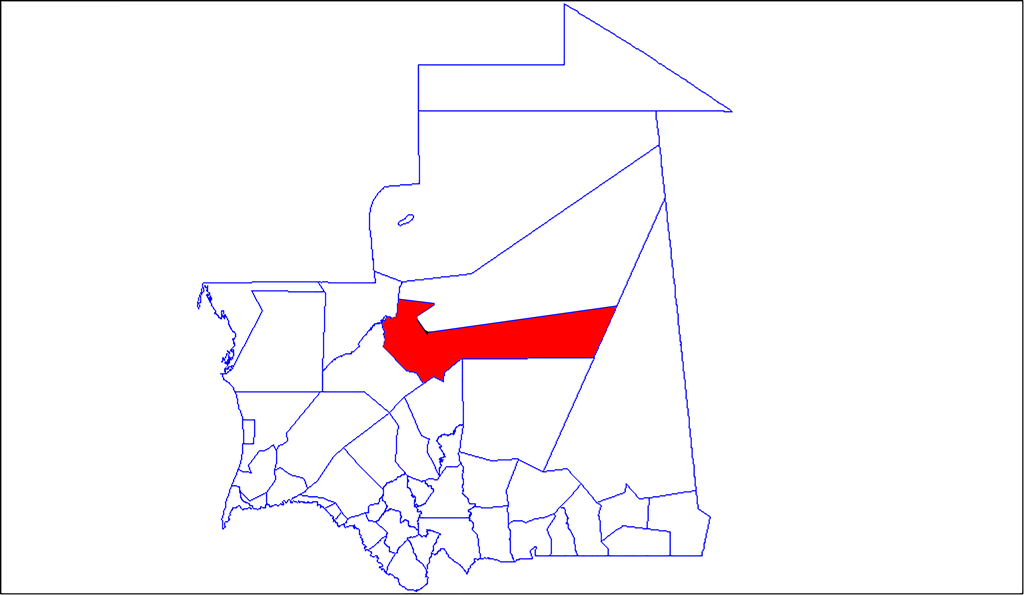
- Country: Mauritania
- Region: Adrar Region

Area
  - Total: 61,815 km^{2} (23,867 sq mi)

Population (2013 census)
  - Total: 6,811
  - Density: 0.1102/km^{2} (0.2854/sq mi)
- Time zone: UTC+0 (+0)

Chinguetti is a department of the Adrar Region in Mauritania. The capital lies at Chinguetti, an ex-Middle Ages center for trade which is considered to be a ghost town. The other village in this mostly desert-area department is Ain Savra.

== Constituency ==
The Chinguetti constituency occupies the same area as the department and is located in the Adrar Region. In 2018 there were a total of 7,577 registered voters and they own 1 seat in congress.
