= Bangou, Mauritania =

Coordinates: 16°17′N 7°00′W

Bangou
- Commune and village
- Interactive map of Bangou
- Country: Mauritania
- Region: Hodh Ech Chargui
- Department: Néma

Population (2023)
  - Total: 13,673
- Time zone: UTC±00:00 (GMT)

Bangou is a village and rural commune in the Hodh Ech Chargui region of Mauritania. As of 2013, its population is 10,157. In 2023, its population was 13,673.
