= El Megve =

- Commune and village
- Interactive map of El Megve
- Country: Mauritania
- Region: Hodh Ech Chargui

Government
  - Mayor: Guejmoul O/ Amar (PRDS)

Population (2023)
  - Total: 15,232
- Time zone: UTC+0 (GMT)

El Megve is a village and rural commune in the Hodh Ech Chargui Region of south-eastern Mauritania.

In 2000, it had a population of 7612. In 2023, it had a population of 15,232.
