= Arr, Mauritania =

Arr
- Commune and town
- Location in Mauritania
- Coordinates: 16°7′N 7°16′W
- Country: Mauritania
- Region: Guidimaka

Government
  - Mayor: Soumaré Hamidou Samba (PRDS)

Area
  - Total: 329.3 sq mi (852.9 km^{2})

Population (2023)
  - Total: 22,144
  - Density: 67.24/sq mi (25.96/km^{2})
- Time zone: UTC+0 (GMT)

Arr is a town and commune in the Guidimaka Region of south-eastern Mauritania.

In 2013, it had a population of 17,085. In 2023, it had a population of 22,144.
