= Boutalhaya =

- Commune and village
- Interactive map of Boutalhaya
- Country: Mauritania
- Region: Trarza

Population (2023)
  - Total: 11,739
- Time zone: UTC+0 (GMT)

Boutalhaya or Boutalhaye is a village and rural commune in the Trarza Region of south-western Mauritania. The commune of Boutalhaya is composed of approximately 18 villages, ranging from small hamlets to larger settlements. All of these villages are distributed in a roughly circular pattern, with the town of Boutalhaya at their center as the administrative capital of the commune. The commune of Boutalhaya, like most areas of Mauritania, is home to various tribes. The main tribe residing in the town of Boutalhaya is Ewlâd El Faghy. Each village within the commune also includes other tribal groups; for example, the village of Ajuer is predominantly inhabited by members of the Tejekanit tribe.

In 2000, it had a population of 10,502. In 2023, it had a population of 11,739.
