= Ghlig Ehel Boye =

- Commune and village
- Country: Mauritania
- Region: Hodh Ech Chargui

Government
  - Mayor: Abderahmane O/ Cheikh Mahfoudh (PRDS)

Population (2000)
  - Total: 4,564
- Time zone: UTC+0 (GMT)

Ghlig Ehel Boye is a village and rural commune in the Hodh Ech Chargui Region of south-eastern Mauritania.

In 2000, it had a population of 4564.
