= Aouleiguatt =

Coordinates: 17.8160°N 15.4227°W

- Commune and village
- Interactive map of Aouleiguatt
- Country: Mauritania
- Region: Trarza

Population (2000)
  - Total: 8,467
- Time zone: UTC+0 (GMT)

Aouleiguatt is a village and rural commune in the Trarza Region of south-western Mauritania.

In 2000, it had a population of 8,467.
