= Barkeol =

- Commune and city
- Location in Mauritania
- Coordinates: 16°6′N 12°5′W
- Country: Mauritania
- Region: Assaba

Population (2023)
  - Total: 12,091
- Time zone: UTC±00:00 (GMT)

Barkeol is a city and commune in Mauritania.

In 1999, 50% of Dracunculiasis cases in Mauritania were reported from Barkeol.
