= El Aria =

- Commune and village
- Country: Mauritania
- Region: Trarza

Population (2000)
  - Total: 7,496
- Time zone: UTC+0 (GMT)

El Aria or El Ariye is a village and rural commune in the Trarza Region of south-western Mauritania.

In 2000 it had a population of 7496.
