= N'Savenni =

N' Savenni
- Commune and village
- Location in Mauritania
- Coordinates: 16.7667654°N 9.7736055°W
- Country: Mauritania
- Region: Hodh El Gharbi
- Department: Aïoun El Atrouss

Population (2000)
  - Total: 5,365
- Time zone: UTC±00:00 (GMT)

N' Savenni is a village and rural commune in Hodh El Gharbi, Mauritania.
