= Boeir Tores =

Coordinates: 17.0167°N 15.7316°W

Boeir Tores ابير التورس Bei Taouress
- Commune and village
- Interactive map of Boeir Tores
- Country: Mauritania

Population (2013)
  - Total: 1,998
- Time zone: UTC±00:00 (GMT)

Boeir Tores is a village and rural commune in Mauritania.
