= Woumpou =

Coordinates: 15°08′N 12°44′W

- Commune and town
- Interactive map of Woumpou
- Country: Mauritania
- Time zone: UTC±00:00 (GMT)

Woumpou is a town and commune in Mauritania. A scientific survey of the water courses was undertaken in 1986.
