= Tawaz =

Tawaz أطواز
- Commune and town
- Location in Mauritania
- Coordinates: 20°39′34″N 12°53′22″W
- Country: Mauritania
- Region: Adrar
- Time zone: UTC±00:00 (GMT)

Tawaz (Arabic: أطواز) is a town and commune in the central Adrar Region of Mauritania.
