= Bareina =

- Commune and village
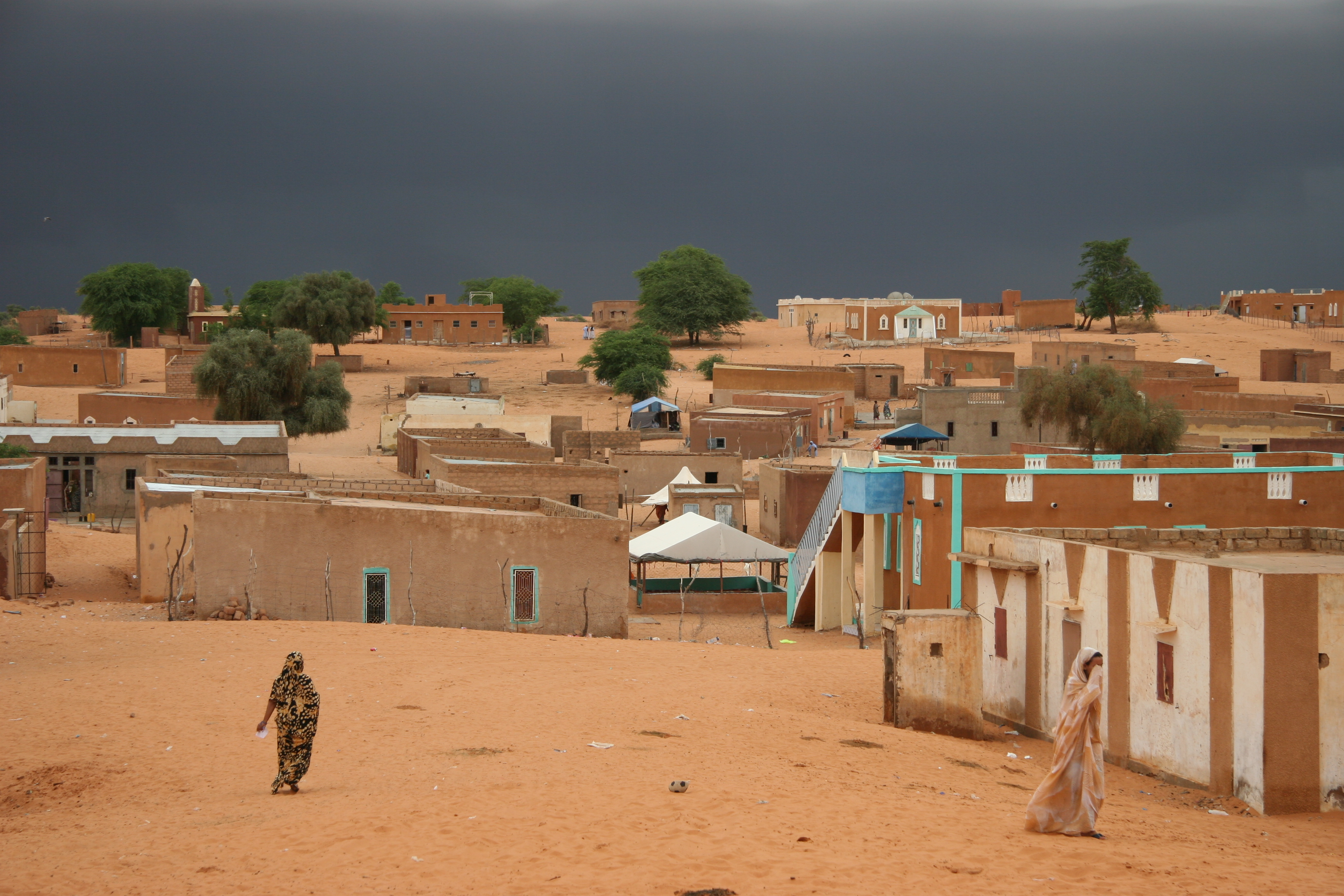
- Bareina, Mauritania

- Location in Mauritania
- Coordinates: 17°10′N 15°11′W
- Country: Mauritania
- Region: Trarza

Government
  - Mayor: Mohamed Abdallahi O/ Hmada O/ Lemrabott (PRDS)

Population (2000)
  - Total: 14,987
- Time zone: UTC+0 (GMT)

Bareina is a Bedouin village and rural commune in the Trarza Region of south-western Mauritania.

In 2000, it had a population of 14,987.
