= Nebaghia =

- Commune and village
- Location in Mauritania
- Coordinates: 17.56589°N 15.04258°W
- Country: Mauritania
- Region: Trarza

Population (2000)
  - Total: 8,165
- Time zone: UTC+0 (GMT)

Nebaghia or Nebaghiya is a village and rural commune in the Trarza Region of south-western Mauritania.

In 2000, it had a population of 8,165.
