= Touil =

Coordinates: 15°32′N 10°07′W

- Commune and town
- Interactive map of Touil
- Country: Mauritania

Population (2023)
  - Total: 12,359
- Time zone: UTC±00:00 (GMT)

Touil (Arabic: الطويل, lit. 'The long') is a town and commune in Touil Department, Hodh El Gharbi, Mauritania. In 2023, its population was 12,359.
