= Lexelba =

Coordinates: 16°13′6″N 13°8′33″W

Lexeiba
- Commune and town
- Location in Mauritania
- Country: Mauritania
- Region: Gorgol Region
- Department: Lexeiba (department)

Population (2023)
  - Total: 17,415
- Time zone: UTC+0 (GMT)

Lexeiba or Lexelba is a town and urban commune in the Gorgol valley Region of southern Mauritania.

In 2000, it had a population of 12,233. In 2023, it had a population of 17,415.

Lake Lexeiba is nearby.
