= Daghveg =

- Commune and town
- Interactive map of Daghveg
- Coordinates: 16°29′16.001″N 12°29′25.79″W
- Country: Mauritania
- Region: Assaba
- Department: Barkeol

Population (2023)
  - Total: 12,978
- Time zone: UTC±00:00 (GMT)

Daghveg is a town and commune in Mauritania.
