= Sori Malé =

- Commune and town
- Location in Mauritania
- Coordinates: 16°12′N 13°54′W
- Country: Mauritania
- Region: Brakna

Government
  - Mayor: Issa Emar Bouhamadi

Area
  - Total: 1,766 sq mi (4,575 km^{2})

Population (2013)
  - Total: 33,301
  - Density: 18.85/sq mi (7.279/km^{2})
- Time zone: UTC+0 (GMT)

Malé or Sori Malé or Mal is a town and commune in the Brakna Region of southern Mauritania on the border with Senegal.

In 2013, it had a population of 33,301.
