= Aoueinat Zbel =

- Commune and town
- Location in Mauritania
- Coordinates: 16.331464°N 8.806299°W
- Country: Mauritania
- Region: Hodh Ech Chargui

Government
  - Mayor: Tar O/ Sidi Mohamed (PRDS)

Population (2023)
  - Total: 14,227
- Time zone: UTC+0 (GMT)

Aoueinat Zbel is a town and commune in the Hodh Ech Chargui Region of south-eastern Mauritania.

In 2000, it had a population of 6,873. In 2023, it had a population of 14,227.
