= Hsey Tine =

Village in Mauritania

- Commune and village
- Interactive map of Hsey Tine
- Country: Mauritania
- Time zone: UTC±00:00 (GMT)

Hsey Tine is a village and rural commune in Mauritania.
