= Monguel =

Coordinates: 16°25′N 13°08′W

Monguel مونكل
- Agricultural Urban Commune
- Interactive map of Monguel
- Country: Mauritania
- Department: Monguel Department

Area
  - Total: 46 sq mi (120 km^{2})

Population (2000)
  - Total: 5,000
  - Density: 130/sq mi (50/km^{2})
- Time zone: UTC±00:00 (GMT)

Monguel is an Urban Agricultural Commune in Mauritania.

== Demographics ==
5000 people lived in Monguel as of 2000, and there were approximately 6000 living there in 2013. 52.5% of its population were females, and 47.5% were males. 67.5% of its population was rural or nomadic, and the remaining 32.5% was urban.
