= Doueirara =

- Commune and village
- Country: Mauritania
- Time zone: UTC±00:00 (GMT)

Doueirara is a village and rural commune in Mauritania with 8119 inhabitants.
