= Gouraye =

Coordinates: 14°54′N 12°27′W

- Commune and town
- Interactive map of Gouraye
- Country: Mauritania
- Time zone: UTC±00:00 (GMT)

Gouraye is a town and commune in Mauritania, located in the Guidimaka Region.

== Climate ==
In Gouraye, there is a Semi-arid climate with little rainfall. The Köppen-Geiger climate classification is BSh. The average annual temperature in Gouraye is 28.6 °C (83.5 °F). About 518 mm (20.39 in) of precipitation falls annually.

Climate data for Gouraye
Month	Jan	Feb	Mar	Apr	May	Jun	Jul	Aug	Sep	Oct	Nov	Dec	Year
Mean daily maximum °C (°F)	33.9 (93.0)	36.3 (97.3)	38.8 (101.8)	40.5 (104.9)	40.7 (105.3)	37.4 (99.3)	33.4 (92.1)	32.1 (89.8)	33.0 (91.4)	35.9 (96.6)	36.3 (97.3)	33.4 (92.1)	36.0 (96.7)
Mean daily minimum °C (°F)	15.9 (60.6)	17.6 (63.7)	20.7 (69.3)	23.9 (75.0)	25.8 (78.4)	25.2 (77.4)	23.5 (74.3)	23.0 (73.4)	22.5 (72.5)	21.8 (71.2)	18.9 (66.0)	16.5 (61.7)	21.3 (70.3)
Average precipitation mm (inches)	0 (0)	1 (0.0)	0 (0)	0 (0)	4 (0.2)	52 (2.0)	124 (4.9)	176 (6.9)	126 (5.0)	31 (1.2)	3 (0.1)	1 (0.0)	518 (20.4)
Source: Climate-Data.org, Climate data
