= Tinghadej =

- Commune and village
- Location in Mauritania
- Country: Mauritania
- Time zone: UTC+0 (GMT)

Tinghadej is a village and rural commune in Mauritania.
