= El Mouyessar =

- Commune and village
- Interactive map of El Mouyessar
- Country: Mauritania
- Time zone: UTC±00:00 (GMT)

El Mouyessar , also spelled El Moyesser, is a village and rural commune in Mauritania; it has a population of 1,625 as of 2013.
