= Bababé =

Bababé بابابي
- Commune and town
- Location in Mauritania
- Coordinates: 16°20′N 13°57′W
- Country: Mauritania
- Region: Brakna

Government
  - Mayor: Amadou Amadou Sall (UDP)

Area
  - Commune and town: 72.10 km^{2} (27.84 sq mi)

Population (2013 census)
  - Commune and town: 12,883
  - Urban: 7,176
- Time zone: UTC+0 (GMT)

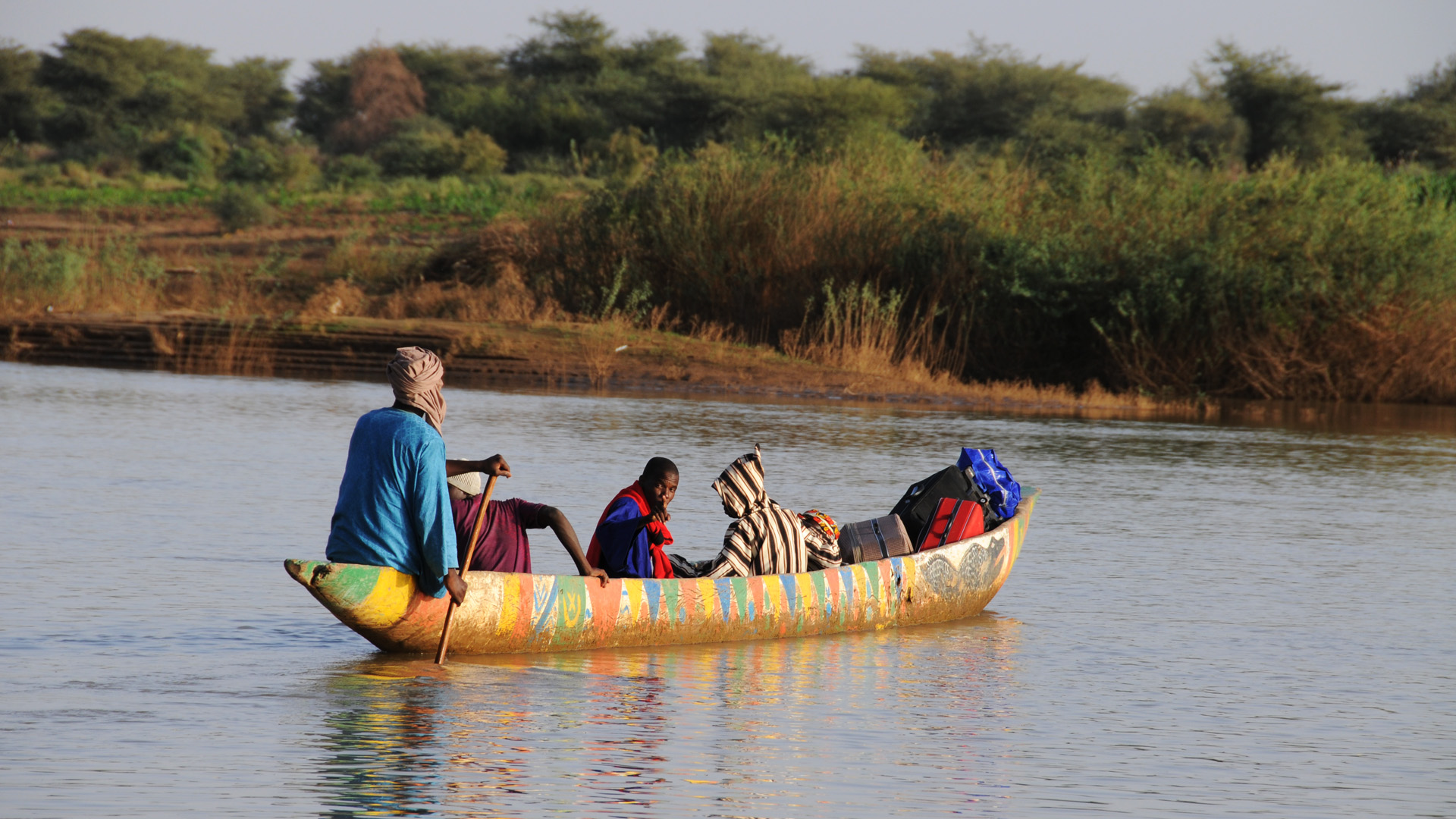
Three people crossing a river in Bababé

Bababé is a town and commune in the Brakna Region of southern Mauritania, located on the border with Senegal.

In 2013, it had a population of 12,883.
