= Tékane =

- Commune and town
- Location in Mauritania
- Coordinates: 16°34′41″N 15°27′34″W
- Country: Mauritania
- Region: Trarza

Population (2023)
  - Total: 15,304
- Time zone: UTC+0 (GMT)

Tékane is a town and urban commune in the Trarza Region of southern Mauritania, near the border of Senegal. It is located east of Rosso.

In 2000, it had a population of 22,041. In 2023, it had a population of 15,304.
