= Ain Savra =

- Commune and village
- Interactive map of Ain Savra
- Country: Mauritania

Area
  - Total: 2,819 sq mi (7,302 km^{2})

Population (2023 census)
  - Total: 1,705
  - Density: 0.6048/sq mi (0.2335/km^{2})
- Time zone: UTC±00:00 (GMT)

Ain Savra is a village and rural commune in Mauritania.
