= El Verea =

- Commune and village
- Interactive map of El Verea
- Country: Mauritania
- Region: Brakna Region
- Time zone: UTC±00:00 (GMT)

El Verea is a village and rural commune in the Brakna Region of Mauritania.

In 2023 municipal elections in the Brakna Region, the El Wiam party elected nine répartition conseillers to UPR's eight for El Verea.

In 2024, the Sahel Gender Fund project reported that two organizations it supported, the Comité de Solidarité avec les Victimes des Violations des Droits Humains (Committee of Solidarity with Victims of Human Rights Violations) and the Association Terre Espoir pour le développement, were active in El Verea and five other municipalities.

A Brakna study under the auspices of the Mauritanian Minister of Agriculture was published in November 2023; El Verea was one of the communities included in the study.
