= Bou Lahrath =

Boulahrath بولحراث Bou Lahrath
- Commune and town
- Interactive map of Boulahrath
- Country: Mauritania
- Region: Assaba
- Department: Barkeol

Population (2023)
  - Total: 12,875
- Time zone: UTC±00:00 (GMT)

Boulahrath is a town and commune in Mauritania.
