= Feireni =

- Commune and town
- Country: Mauritania
- Region: Hodh Ech Chargui

Government
  - Mayor: Ethmane O/ Henoune (PRDS)

Population (2023)
  - Total: 14,526
- Time zone: UTC+0 (GMT)

Feireni is a village and rural commune in the Hodh Ech Chargui Region of south-eastern Mauritania.

In 2000, it had a population of 6427. In 2023, it had a population of 14,526.
