= Hassichegar =

- Commune and town
- Interactive map of Hassichegar
- Country: Mauritania

Area
  - Commune and town: 203.8 sq mi (527.9 km^{2})

Population (2013 census)
  - Commune and town: 20,265
  - Urban: 5,632
- Time zone: UTC±00:00 (GMT)

Hassichegar is a town and commune in Mauritania.

In 2013, it had a population of 20,265.
