= Hassimhadi =

Hassimhadi حاسي امهادي
- Commune and village
- Interactive map of Hassimhadi
- Coordinates: 15°49′23″N 8°22′52″W
- Country: Mauritania

Area
  - Total: 990 sq mi (2,565 km^{2})

Population (2023)
  - Total: 15,624
  - Density: 15.78/sq mi (6.091/km^{2})
- Time zone: UTC±00:00 (GMT)

Hassimhadi is a village and rural commune in Mauritania.

In 2013, it had a population of 13,948. In 2023, it had a population of 15,624.
