= Laftah =

- Commune and village
- Interactive map of Laftah
- Country: Mauritania
- Time zone: UTC±00:00 (GMT)

Laftah is a village and rural commune in Mauritania.
