= Elb Adress =

Elb Adress علب آدرس 'Elb Adres
- Commune and village
- Location in Mauritania
- Coordinates: 17°35′24″N 14°26′53″W
- Country: Mauritania
- Region: Trarza
- Department: Boutilimit
- Commune: Elb Adress

Population (2000)
  - Total: 3,427
- Time zone: UTC+0 (GMT)

Elb Adress or 'Elb Adres (Arabic: عِلْب آدْرِس) is a village and commune of Boutilimit in the Trarza Region of south-western Mauritania.

The commune includes the village of Elb Adress and the smaller satellite villages of El-Muhammediyya (Arabic: المحمدية), Yara (Arabic: يارا), Bou Sdeira (Arabic: بو سْدَيرة), El-Igda (Arabic: العِقدة), Invani or Invéni (Arabic: انْفَنِي), Bou Tleihiyya (Arabic: بو طْلَيحية), and El-Mara'a (Arabic: المرعى).

== Population ==
According to the 2000 Mauritanian census, the commune of Elb Adress had 3,427 residents, of whom 1,816 were male and 1,611 female.

According to the 2006 electoral census, the commune of Elb Adress has 6500 residents, of whom almost half lived in the village of Elb Adress.
