= El Khatt =

Coordinates: 22.6700°N 10.0300°W

- Commune and village
- Interactive map of El Khatt
- Country: Mauritania
- Time zone: UTC±00:00 (GMT)

El Khatt is a village and rural commune in Mauritania.
