= Timbédra =

- Commune and town
- Location in Mauritania
- Coordinates: 16°15′N 8°10′W
- Country: Mauritania
- Region: Hodh Ech Chargui

Area
  - Commune and town: 462.4 km^{2} (178.5 sq mi)

Population (2013 census)
  - Commune and town: 17,832
  - Density: 38.56/km^{2} (99.88/sq mi)
  - Urban: 14,131
- Time zone: UTC+0 (GMT)

Timbédra (Arabic: تمبدغة) is a commune and town in the Hodh Ech Chargui Region of south-eastern Mauritania. Not to be confused with the department of the same name.

In 2013, it had a population of 17,832.

In 2025, the World Health Organization set up a mental health clinic in Timbédra.

== Transport ==
Timbedra Airport (IATA: TMD, ICAO: GQNH) and Dahara Airport (ICAO: GQNM) are nearby.
