= Oueid Jrid =

- Commune and town
- Interactive map of Oueid Jrid
- Country: Mauritania
- Time zone: UTC±00:00 (GMT)

Oueid Jrid is a town and commune in Mauritania.
