= Sangrave =

Coordinates: 17.6000°N 12.8333°W

- Commune and town
- Interactive map of Sangrave
- Country: Mauritania
- Region: Brakna

Government
  - Mayor: Mohamed Abdellahi O/ Isselmou Mohamed Abdellahi (PRDS)

Population (2000)
  - Total: 14,303
- Time zone: UTC+0 (GMT)

Sangrave is a town and commune in the Brakna Region of southern Mauritania.

In 2000, it had a population of 14,303.
