= Egjert =

Coordinates: 16°28′27″N 9°18′55″W

- Commune and village
- Interactive map of Egjert
- Country: Mauritania
- Time zone: UTC±00:00 (GMT)

Egjert is a village and rural commune in Mauritania.
