= Bouanze =

Coordinates: 15°49′N 12°14′W

- Commune and village
- Interactive map of Bouanze
- Country: Mauritania
- Time zone: UTC±00:00 (GMT)

Bouanze is a village and rural commune in Mauritania. It is famous for being one of the last places on Earth that has diabondé, a kind of mural art that is disappearing.
