= Baidiyam =

Coordinates: 15.0573°N 11.8488°W

- Commune and village
- Interactive map of Baidiyam
- Country: Mauritania
- Region: Guidimaka
- Department: Ghabou (department)

Population (2023)
  - Total: 12,693
- Time zone: UTC±00:00 (GMT)

Baidiyam is a village and rural commune in Mauritania.
