= Tektaka =

- Commune and village
- Location in Mauritania
- Coordinates: 15.57658°N 11.95761°W
- Country: Mauritania
- Region: Guidimaka
- Department: Ould Yenge (department)

Population (2023)
  - Total: 12,643
- Time zone: UTC±00:00 (GMT)

Tektaka is a village and rural commune in Mauritania.
