= Bouly =

Coordinates: 15°19′N 11°48′W

- Commune and town
- Interactive map of Bouly
- Country: Mauritania

Area
  - Total: 221.1 sq mi (572.7 km^{2})

Population (2013 census)
  - Total: 14,906
  - Density: 67.41/sq mi (26.03/km^{2})
- Time zone: UTC±00:00 (GMT)

Bouly is a town and commune in Mauritania.

In 2013, it had a population of 14,906.
