= Mabrouk I =

Mabrouk
- Commune and village
- Country: Mauritania
- Region: Hodh El Gharbi

Government
  - Mayor: Bah Ould Jiddou Ould Med Laghdaf (PRDS)

Population (2000)
  - Total: 5,838
- Time zone: UTC+0 (GMT)

Mabrouk is a village and rural commune in the Hodh El Gharbi Region of south-eastern Mauritania.

In 2000, it had a population of 5,838.
