= Taguilalett =

Coordinates: 17.0444°N 15.5205°W

- Commune and village
- Interactive map of Taguilalett
- Country: Mauritania
- Region: Trarza

Population (2000)
  - Total: 2,726
- Time zone: UTC+0 (GMT)

Taguilalett or Taguilalet is a village and rural commune in the Trarza Region of south-western Mauritania.

In 2000 it had a population of 2,726.
