= Gueller =

- Commune and town
- Interactive map of Gueller
- Country: Mauritania
- Time zone: UTC±00:00 (GMT)

Gueller is a town and commune in Mauritania.
