= Lehseira =

- Commune and village
- Interactive map of Lehseira
- Coordinates: 17°20′50″N 11°36′24″W
- Country: Mauritania
- Time zone: UTC±00:00 (GMT)

Lehseira is a village and rural commune in Mauritania.
