= Ghabou =

- Commune and town
- Interactive map of Ghabou
- Coordinates: 14°44′22″N 12°05′14″W
- Country: Mauritania

Area
  - Commune and town: 386 sq mi (1,001 km^{2})

Population (2013 census)
  - Commune and town: 34,924
  - Density: 90.36/sq mi (34.89/km^{2})
  - Urban: 5,038
- Time zone: UTC±00:00 (GMT)

Ghabou is a town and commune in Mauritania.

In 2013, it had a population of 34,924.
