= Leouossy =

- Commune and town
- Interactive map of Leouossy
- Country: Mauritania
- Region: Assaba
- Department: Barkeol

Population (2023)
  - Total: 20,703
- Time zone: UTC±00:00 (GMT)

Leouossy is a town and commune in Mauritania.
