= Ain Ehel Taya =

Coordinates: 20°16′06″N 13°13′17″W

Ain Ehel Taya عین اهل الطایع
- Commune and town
- Interactive map of Ain Ehel Taya
- Country: Mauritania
- Region: Adrar

Government
  - Mayor: Mohamed Ely Cheinoune

Area
  - Total: 4,059 sq mi (10,513 km^{2})

Population (2013)
  - Total: 4,432
  - Density: 1.092/sq mi (0.4216/km^{2})
- Time zone: UTC+0 (GMT)

Ain Ehel Taya (Arabic: عین اهل الطایع) is a town and commune in the Adrar Region of Mauritania. Its current mayor is Mohamed Ely Cheinoune.

In 2013, it had a population of 4,432.
