= Ajoueir =

Coordinates: 17°12′06″N 14°52′55″W

- Commune and village
- Interactive map of Ajoueir
- Country: Mauritania
- Region: Trarza

Population (2000)
  - Total: 4,413
- Time zone: UTC+0 (GMT)

Ajoueir is a village and rural commune in the Trarza Region of south-western Mauritania.

In 2000, it had a population of 4,413.
