= Aoujeft =

Aoujeft اوجفت
- Commune and town
- Location in Mauritania
- Coordinates: 19°58′N 13°04′W
- Country: Mauritania
- Region: Adrar Region

Government
  - Mayor: Mohamed El Moctar Ould Hmoine Amar (PRDS)

Population (2000)
  - Total: 6,019

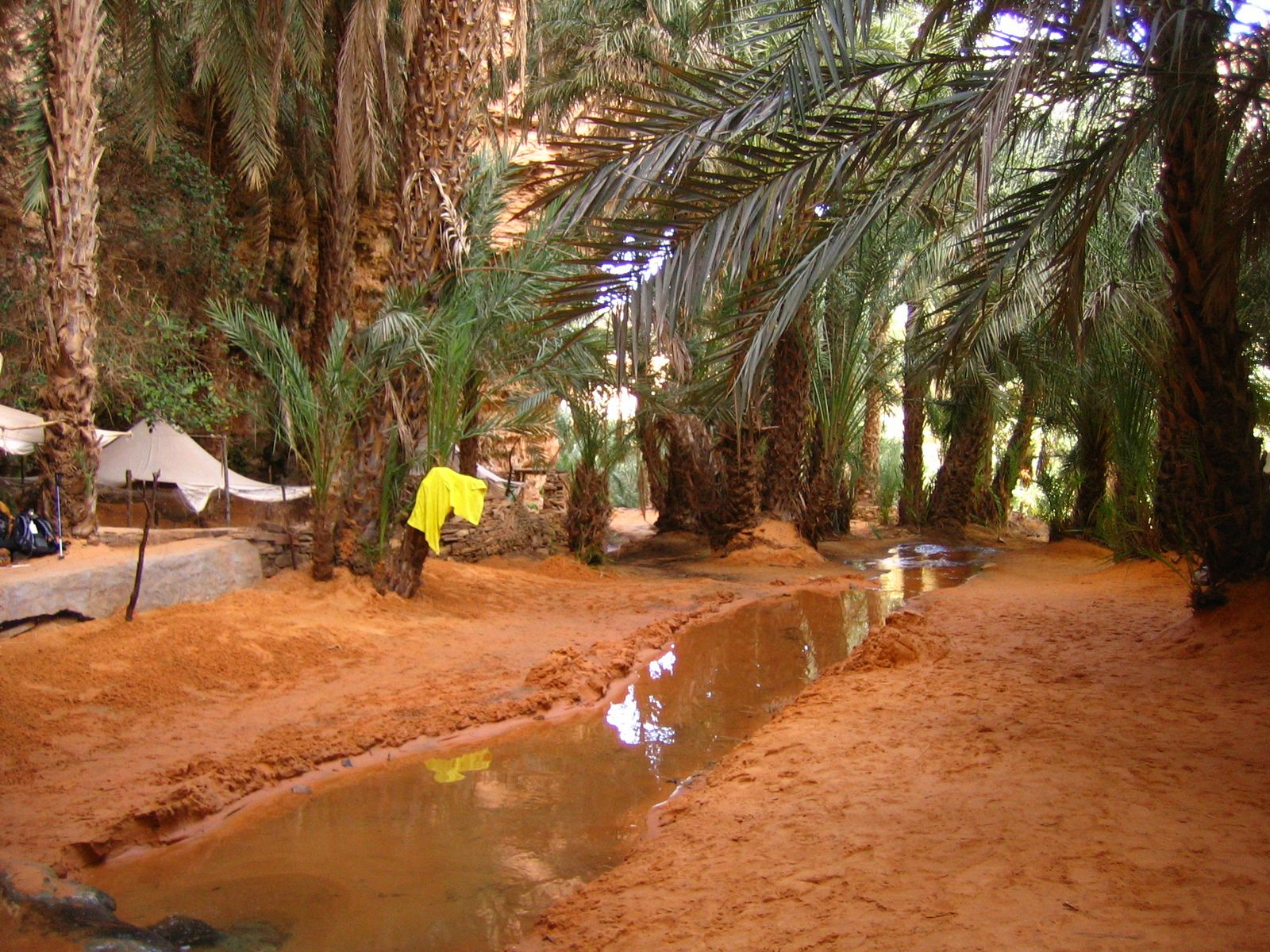
Image of Aoujeft

Aoujeft or Oujeft (Arabic: اوجفت) is a town and commune in the Adrar Region of western Mauritania.

In 2000, it had a population of 6,019.
