= Maaden El-Irvane =

Maaden المعدن
- Commune and village
- Interactive map of Maaden
- Country: Mauritania
- Time zone: UTC±00:00 (GMT)

Maaden El-Irvane, sometimes just Maaden (Arabic: المعدن), is a rural commune, oasis, and intentional community in the Mauritanian region of Adrar. Close to Nouakchott in northern Mauritania, it administratively includes the oasis of Mhaïreth.

The settlement applies Sharia law differently from how much of Mauritania and most Islamic states do, where most Muslims strictly regulate direct contact between men and women from different families and where women are likely to be excluded from certain activities.

Sheikh Mohamed Saleck Ould Mohamed Lemine established Maaden El-Irvane in 1975 as a tolerant Sufi community where men and women work together, mostly in agricultural activities. Residents first built a small dam to retain water, then laid out fields, founded a school and set up a community clinic and visitor centre. Because health and hospitality is a central tenet of the community, it provides accommodation and food for all who pass through the settlement regardless of race or religion.

The community ethos of the oasis is based on a particular understanding of fitra which embraces fraternity, tolerance and hard work. In 2004, Zeinab Mintou Boubou, then-president of the women's farming cooperative noted, "In Maaden, a woman can farm, put on boots, do manual work and wave to a man. It's different from other villages".

The Japanese International Cooperation Agency in association with the Ministere Du Developpement Rural Et De L'Environnement de la Republique Islamique De Mauritanie Project Oasis (2004) entry NoAD15 noted that the total population was 110 and that 85% of the land area was agricultural. 60 people were regularly employed in mixed farming, 34 specialised in crop production, and three in herding animals.

In 2018 Pierre Rabhi, a Muslim convert to Christianity, introduced the concept of agroecosystems to the oasis, which promoted organic farming.

== See also ==
- Aminetou Mint El-Moctar
- Islamic feminism
