= Mabrouk II =

Coordinates: 15.6209°N 8.4159°W

Mabrouk
- Commune and village
- Interactive map of Mabrouk
- Country: Mauritania
- Region: Hodh Ech Chargui

Government
  - Mayor: Teghra O/ Brahim (PRDS)

Population (2023)
  - Total: 12,111
- Time zone: UTC+0 (GMT)

Mabrouk or El Mabrouk is a village and rural commune in the Hodh Ech Chargui Region of south-eastern Mauritania.

In 2000, it had a population of 4248. In 2023, it had a population of 12,111.
