= R'Dheidhi =

- Commune and town
- Interactive map of R'Dheidhi
- Coordinates: 16°48′31″N 12°43′35″W
- Country: Mauritania
- Region: Assaba
- Department: Barkeol

Population (2023)
  - Total: 12,248
- Time zone: UTC±00:00 (GMT)

R'Dheidhi or Rdheidhi is a town and commune in Mauritania.
