= Beneamane =

Coordinates: 16.3684°N 9.6245°W

- Commune and village
- Interactive map of Beneamane
- Country: Mauritania
- Region: Hodh Ech Chargui

Government
  - Mayor: Sidaty Ould Mohamed

Population (2025)
  - Total: 4,490
- Time zone: UTC+0 (GMT)

Beneamane or Benamane is a village and rural commune in the Hodh Ech Chargui Region of south-eastern Mauritania.

In 2000, it had a population of 4446 (Phaedrus people).
