= Ajar, Mauritania =

Ajar
- Commune and town
- Interactive map of Ajar
- Country: Mauritania
- Region: Guidimaka

Government
  - Mayor: Sow Idrissa (UDP)

Area
  - Total: 259.4 sq mi (671.8 km^{2})

Population (2013 census)
  - Total: 14,357
  - Density: 55.35/sq mi (21.37/km^{2})
- Time zone: UTC+0 (GMT)

Ajar is a town and commune in the south-central Assaba region of Mauritania.

In 2013, the city had a population of 14,357.
