= Djiguenni =

Coordinates: 15.7333°N 8.6667°W

Djiguenni جكني
- Commune and town
- Interactive map of Djiguenni
- Country: Mauritania

Population (2023)
  - Total: 22,101
- Time zone: UTC±00:00 (GMT)

Djiguenni (Arabic: جكني) is a town and commune in Mauritania on the border of Mali.

In November 2007, it was the scene of violent riots against food prices.

== Population ==
At the time of the 2000 census, the population stood at 10,862. In 2023, the population was 22,101.
