= Tarenguet Ehel Moul =

- Commune and village
- Interactive map of Tarenguet Ehel Moul
- Country: Mauritania
- Time zone: UTC±00:00 (GMT)

Tarenguet Ehel Moul is a village and rural commune in Mauritania.
