= Tachott =

- Commune and town
- Interactive map of Tachott
- Country: Mauritania
- Region: Guidimaka
- Department: Sélibaby (department)

Area
  - Total: 216.5 sq mi (560.7 km^{2})

Population (2023 census)
  - Total: 19,073
  - Density: 88.10/sq mi (34.02/km^{2})
- Time zone: UTC±00:00 (GMT)

Tachott is a town and commune in southern Mauritania. It is located in the Sélibaby department in the Guidimaka Region.

In 2013, it had a population of 15,099. In 2023, it had a population of 19,073.
