= Magta Lahjar =

- Commune and town
- Location in Mauritania
- Coordinates: 17°26′54″N 13°8′20″W
- Country: Mauritania
- Region: Brakna

Government
  - Mayor: Moussa O/ Cheikh Ahmedou (PRDS)

Area
  - Commune and town: 267.8 sq mi (693.7 km^{2})

Population (2013 census)
  - Commune and town: 18,616
  - Density: 69.50/sq mi (26.84/km^{2})
  - Urban: 12,498
- Time zone: UTC+0 (GMT)

Magta Lahjar is a town and commune in the Brakna Region of southern Mauritania.

In 2013, it had a population of 18,616.
