= El Ghabra =

Coordinates: 16°39′N 12°40′W

- Commune and town
- Interactive map of El Ghabra
- Country: Mauritania
- Region: Assaba
- Department: Barkeol

Area
  - Total: 215.7 sq mi (558.7 km^{2})

Population (2023 census)
  - Total: 21,562
  - Density: 99.96/sq mi (38.59/km^{2})
- Time zone: UTC±00:00 (GMT)

El Ghabra is a town and commune in Mauritania.
