= 2023 Mauritanian census =

Fifth national census of Mauritania

2023 Mauritania census
- 25 December 2023 to 8 January 2024

General information
- Country: Mauritania
- Authority: ANSADE
- Website: ansade.mr

Results
- Total population: 4,927,532 (▲3.37%)
- Most populous region: Nouakchott South (627,415)
- Least populous region: Inchiri (29,484)

The 2023 General Population and Housing Census (Arabic: التعداد العام للسكان والمساكن 2023; French: Recensement Général de la Population et de l’Habitat de 2023, RGPH-5) was the fifth census of the Islamic Republic of Mauritania, taking place between 25 December 2023 and 8 January 2024. It was administered by the National Agency for Statistics, Demographic and Economic Analysis and found the population to be 4,927,532 people.

== Results ==
=== Population by region ===
Regions	Population		
Regions	♂	♀	Total
Adrar	34,710	36,913	71,623
Assaba	203,189	248,615	451,804
Brakna	181,163	210,147	391,310
Dakhlet Nouadhibou	102,944	81,515	184,459
Gorgol	210,612	231,878	442,490
Guidimakha	172,362	190,713	363,075
Hodh Ech Chargui	288,388	337,255	625,643
Hodh El Gharbi	186,877	216,214	403,091
Inchiri	18,466	11,018	29,484
Nouakchott North	303,315	311,150	614,465
Nouakchott South	315,156	312,259	627,415
Nouakchott West	105,167	99,714	204,881
Tagant	54,264	60,496	114,760
Tiris Zemmour	46,899	32,230	79,129
Trarza	151,958	171,945	323,903
Total	2,375,470	2,552,062	4,927,532

=== Fertility rate by region ===
Regions	TFR
Gorgol	5,7
Guidimakha	5,6
Brakna	5,2
Hodh El Gharbi	5,2
Hodh Ech Chargui	5,1
Assaba	4,9
Tagant	4,9
Mauritania	4,7
Inchiri	4,4
Trarza	4,3
Nouakchott South	4,2
Adrar	4,0
Tiris Zemmour	4,0
Dakhlet Nouadhibou	3,9
Nouakchott North	3,9
Nouakchott West	3,5
