= Demographics of Mauritania =

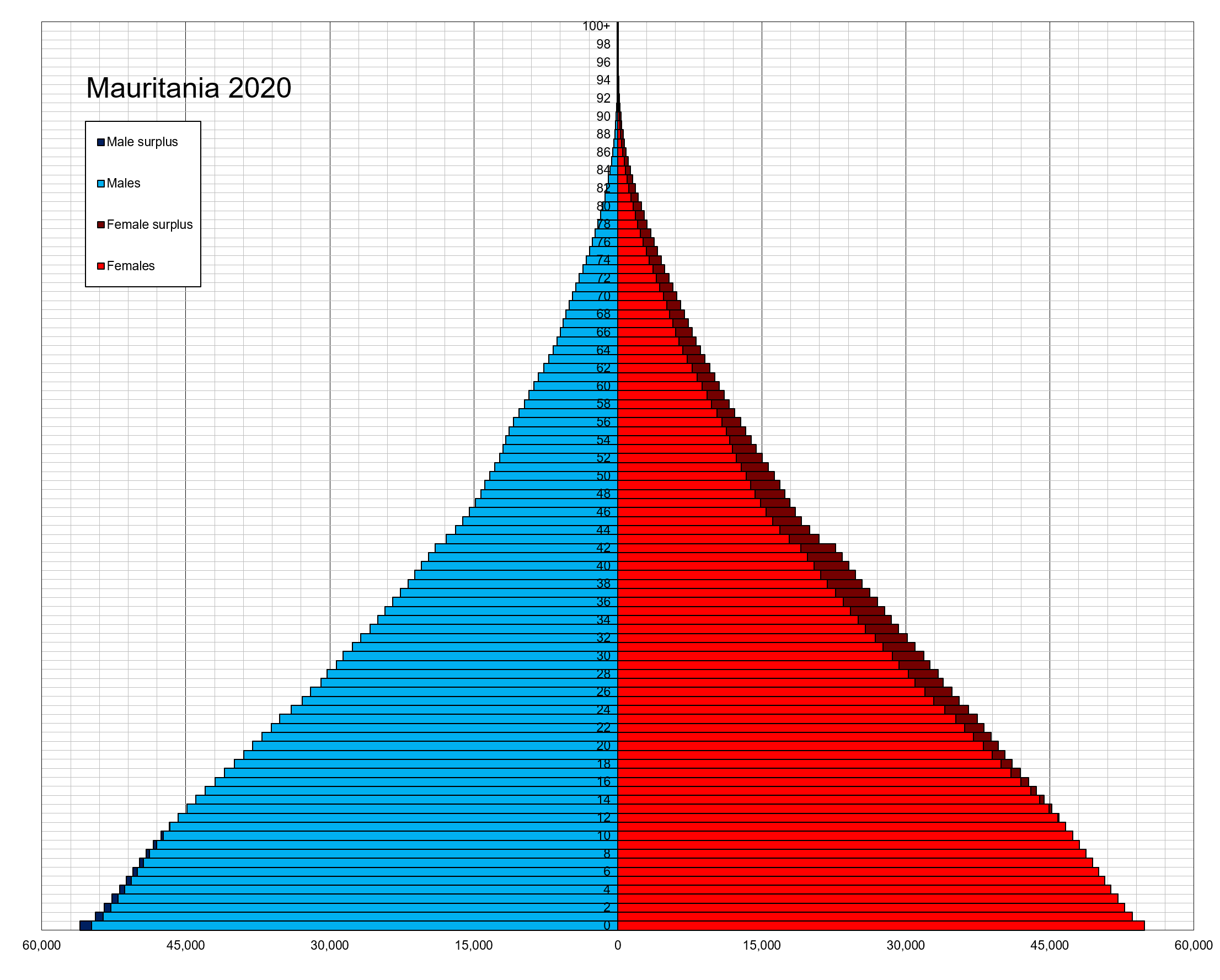
- Population pyramid of Mauritania in 2020
- Population: 5,169,342 (2024 est.)
- Growth rate: 1.99% (2022 est.)
- Birth rate: 28.06 births/1,000 population (2022 est.)
- Death rate: 7.43 deaths/1,000 population (2022 est.)
- Life expectancy: 65.22 years
  - male: 62.77 years
  - female: 67.75 years
- Fertility rate: 4.40 children born/woman (2022 est.)
- Infant mortality: 50.99 deaths/1,000 live births
- Net migration rate: -0.72 migrant(s)/1,000 population (2022 est.)

Age structure
- 0–14 years: 40.92%
- 15–64 years: 55.87%
- 65 and over: 3.21%

Nationality
- Nationality: Mauritanian
- Major ethnic: Beidane; Haratin; Afro-Arabs
- Minor ethnic: Fula; Wolof; Toucouleur; Soninke; Serer; Zenaga; Imraguen

Language
- Official: Arabic (official)
- Spoken: Languages of Mauritania

Demographic features of the population of Mauritania (Arabic: التركيبة السكانية في موريتانيا) include population density, ethnicity, education level, health of the populace, economic status, religious affiliations and other aspects.

== Population ==
Population, fertility rate and net reproduction rate, United Nations estimates

Census population and growth rate
| Year | Pop. | ±% p.a. |
|---|---|---|
| 1977 | 1,338,830 | — |
| 1988 | 1,864,236 | +3.06% |
| 2000 | 2,508,159 | +2.50% |
| 2013 | 3,537,368 | +2.68% |
| 2023 | 4,927,532 | +3.37% |

According to the 2022 revision of the World Population Prospects, the total population was 4,614,974 in 2021, compared to only 657 000 in 1950. The proportion of children below the age of 15 in 2010 was 39.9%, 57.4% was between 15 and 65 years of age, while 2.7% was 65 years or older.

| | Total population (x 1000) | Population aged 0–14 (%) | Population aged 15–64 (%) | Population aged 65+ (%) |
|---|---|---|---|---|
| 1950 | 657 | 43.8 | 54.8 | 1.4 |
| 1955 | 744 | 43.6 | 54.7 | 1.6 |
| 1960 | 854 | 44.3 | 53.8 | 1.8 |
| 1965 | 984 | 45.2 | 52.8 | 2.0 |
| 1970 | 1 134 | 45.8 | 52.1 | 2.2 |
| 1975 | 1 312 | 45.8 | 51.9 | 2.3 |
| 1980 | 1 518 | 45.6 | 51.9 | 2.4 |
| 1985 | 1 748 | 45.3 | 52.2 | 2.5 |
| 1990 | 1 996 | 44.9 | 52.5 | 2.6 |
| 1995 | 2 292 | 44.0 | 53.4 | 2.7 |
| 2000 | 2 643 | 42.7 | 54.6 | 2.7 |
| 2005 | 3 047 | 41.2 | 56.1 | 2.7 |
| 2010 | 3 460 | 39.9 | 57.4 | 2.7 |

=== Structure of the population ===
Structure of the population (Census 24.II.2013):

| Age group | Male | Female | Total | % |
|---|---|---|---|---|
| Total | 1 743 074 | 1 794 294 | 3 537 368 | 100 |
| 0–4 | 316 217 | 298 475 | 614 692 | 17.38 |
| 5–9 | 263 263 | 256 839 | 520 102 | 14.70 |
| 10–14 | 212 838 | 216 667 | 429 505 | 12.14 |
| 15–19 | 176 116 | 185 288 | 361 404 | 10.22 |
| 20–24 | 144 478 | 157 962 | 302 440 | 8.55 |
| 25–29 | 121 586 | 135 767 | 257 353 | 7.28 |
| 30–34 | 99 834 | 113 691 | 213 525 | 6.04 |
| 35–39 | 83 578 | 95 379 | 178 957 | 5.06 |
| 40–44 | 72 108 | 79 228 | 151 336 | 4.28 |
| 45–49 | 60 297 | 64 516 | 124 813 | 3.53 |
| 50–54 | 50 739 | 51 751 | 102 490 | 2.90 |
| 55–59 | 41 075 | 40 645 | 81 720 | 2.31 |
| 60–64 | 31 660 | 30 459 | 62 119 | 1.76 |
| 65–69 | 24 120 | 23 055 | 47 175 | 1.33 |
| 70–74 | 18 167 | 17 129 | 35 296 | 1.00 |
| 75–79 | 12 670 | 12 231 | 24 901 | 0.70 |
| 80–84 | 8 080 | 8 584 | 16 664 | 0.47 |
| 85+ | 6 248 | 6 628 | 12 876 | 0.36 |
| Age group | Male | Female | Total | Percent |
| 0–14 | 792 318 | 771 981 | 1 564 299 | 44.22 |
| 15–64 | 881 471 | 954 686 | 1 836 157 | 51.91 |
| 65+ | 69 285 | 67 627 | 136 912 | 3.87 |

Population by Age Group (Estimates 1.VII.2016) (Data refer to national projections.):

| Age group | Total | % |
|---|---|---|
| Total | 3 782 701 | 100 |
| 0–4 | 579 832 | 15.33 |
| 5–9 | 567 643 | 15.01 |
| 10–14 | 478 293 | 12.64 |
| 15–19 | 396 650 | 10.49 |
| 20–24 | 333 473 | 8.82 |
| 25–29 | 280 531 | 7.42 |
| 30–34 | 236 864 | 6.26 |
| 35–39 | 196 168 | 5.19 |
| 40–44 | 164 707 | 4.35 |
| 45–49 | 137 439 | 3.63 |
| 50–54 | 111 936 | 2.96 |
| 55–59 | 90 008 | 2.38 |
| 60–64 | 68 836 | 1.82 |
| 65–69 | 50 266 | 1.33 |
| 70–74 | 36 188 | 0.96 |
| 75–79 | 24 540 | 0.65 |
| 80+ | 29 328 | 0.78 |
| Age group | Total | Percent |
| 0–14 | 1 625 768 | 42.98 |
| 15–64 | 2 016 611 | 53.31 |
| 65+ | 140 322 | 3.71 |

== Vital statistics ==
Registration of vital events in Mauritania is incomplete. The Population Department of the United Nations prepared the following estimates.

| | Mid-year population | Live births | Deaths | Natural change | Crude birth rate (per 1000) | Crude death rate (per 1000) | Natural change (per 1000) | Total fertility rate (TFR) | Infant mortality (per 1000 live births) | Life expectancy (in years) |
|---|---|---|---|---|---|---|---|---|---|---|
| 1950 | 659,000 | 30,000 | 15,000 | 15,000 | 45.2 | 23.0 | 22.2 | 6.12 | 157.1 | 38.74 |
| 1951 | 673,000 | 31,000 | 15,000 | 15,000 | 45.3 | 22.5 | 22.8 | 6.13 | 155.0 | 39.29 |
| 1952 | 689,000 | 31,000 | 15,000 | 16,000 | 45.2 | 22.1 | 23.1 | 6.13 | 152.8 | 39.77 |
| 1953 | 705,000 | 32,000 | 15,000 | 16,000 | 45.2 | 21.8 | 23.4 | 6.13 | 150.7 | 40.21 |
| 1954 | 721,000 | 33,000 | 15,000 | 17,000 | 45.3 | 21.4 | 23.9 | 6.16 | 148.4 | 40.78 |
| 1955 | 739,000 | 34,000 | 16,000 | 18,000 | 45.4 | 21.0 | 24.4 | 6.18 | 146.1 | 41.41 |
| 1956 | 757,000 | 35,000 | 16,000 | 19,000 | 45.6 | 20.7 | 24.9 | 6.21 | 143.6 | 41.94 |
| 1957 | 776,000 | 36,000 | 16,000 | 20,000 | 45.8 | 20.4 | 25.4 | 6.24 | 141.1 | 42.50 |
| 1958 | 796,000 | 37,000 | 16,000 | 21,000 | 46.0 | 20.0 | 26.0 | 6.28 | 138.4 | 43.16 |
| 1959 | 816,000 | 38,000 | 16,000 | 22,000 | 46.1 | 19.6 | 26.6 | 6.32 | 135.7 | 43.88 |
| 1960 | 838,000 | 39,000 | 16,000 | 23,000 | 46.3 | 19.0 | 27.3 | 6.35 | 133.0 | 44.77 |
| 1961 | 862,000 | 40,000 | 16,000 | 24,000 | 46.6 | 18.6 | 28.0 | 6.40 | 130.1 | 45.44 |
| 1962 | 886,000 | 41,000 | 16,000 | 25,000 | 46.6 | 18.3 | 28.3 | 6.43 | 127.3 | 46.05 |
| 1963 | 911,000 | 43,000 | 16,000 | 26,000 | 46.7 | 17.9 | 28.8 | 6.48 | 124.5 | 46.69 |
| 1964 | 938,000 | 44,000 | 16,000 | 28,000 | 46.8 | 17.4 | 29.4 | 6.53 | 121.7 | 47.45 |
| 1965 | 966,000 | 45,000 | 16,000 | 29,000 | 46.9 | 17.0 | 29.9 | 6.59 | 118.9 | 48.06 |
| 1966 | 995,000 | 47,000 | 17,000 | 30,000 | 47.0 | 16.6 | 30.3 | 6.64 | 116.1 | 48.73 |
| 1967 | 1,025,000 | 48,000 | 17,000 | 31,000 | 46.8 | 16.2 | 30.6 | 6.67 | 113.3 | 49.37 |
| 1968 | 1,056,000 | 49,000 | 17,000 | 32,000 | 46.5 | 15.8 | 30.7 | 6.68 | 110.6 | 50.04 |
| 1969 | 1,089,000 | 50,000 | 17,000 | 34,000 | 46.3 | 15.4 | 30.9 | 6.69 | 108.4 | 50.63 |
| 1970 | 1,122,000 | 52,000 | 17,000 | 35,000 | 46.0 | 15.1 | 30.8 | 6.69 | 107.0 | 51.04 |
| 1971 | 1,156,000 | 53,000 | 17,000 | 36,000 | 45.6 | 14.9 | 30.8 | 6.69 | 106.2 | 51.39 |
| 1972 | 1,191,000 | 54,000 | 18,000 | 37,000 | 45.5 | 14.7 | 30.7 | 6.70 | 105.8 | 51.66 |
| 1973 | 1,227,000 | 56,000 | 18,000 | 38,000 | 45.3 | 14.6 | 30.7 | 6.70 | 105.4 | 51.90 |
| 1974 | 1,264,000 | 57,000 | 18,000 | 39,000 | 45.1 | 14.4 | 30.7 | 6.70 | 104.9 | 52.18 |
| 1975 | 1,302,000 | 59,000 | 18,000 | 40,000 | 44.9 | 14.1 | 30.8 | 6.68 | 104.0 | 52.65 |
| 1976 | 1,342,000 | 60,000 | 19,000 | 41,000 | 44.7 | 13.9 | 30.8 | 6.67 | 102.6 | 52.92 |
| 1977 | 1,381,000 | 62,000 | 19,000 | 43,000 | 44.6 | 13.6 | 30.9 | 6.68 | 100.7 | 53.37 |
| 1978 | 1,422,000 | 63,000 | 19,000 | 44,000 | 44.3 | 13.3 | 31.0 | 6.67 | 98.5 | 53.86 |
| 1979 | 1,464,000 | 64,000 | 19,000 | 45,000 | 43.8 | 12.9 | 30.9 | 6.65 | 96.2 | 54.47 |
| 1980 | 1,507,000 | 66,000 | 19,000 | 47,000 | 43.8 | 12.6 | 31.2 | 6.62 | 94.0 | 55.06 |
| 1981 | 1,552,000 | 68,000 | 19,000 | 49,000 | 43.7 | 12.2 | 31.5 | 6.58 | 91.8 | 55.66 |
| 1982 | 1,598,000 | 69,000 | 19,000 | 50,000 | 43.3 | 11.8 | 31.5 | 6.53 | 89.6 | 56.28 |
| 1983 | 1,646,000 | 71,000 | 19,000 | 52,000 | 42.9 | 11.6 | 31.4 | 6.48 | 87.2 | 56.68 |
| 1984 | 1,696,000 | 72,000 | 19,000 | 53,000 | 42.5 | 11.2 | 31.2 | 6.41 | 84.6 | 57.16 |
| 1985 | 1,746,000 | 73,000 | 19,000 | 54,000 | 41.9 | 10.9 | 31.0 | 6.34 | 81.8 | 57.58 |
| 1986 | 1,798,000 | 74,000 | 19,000 | 55,000 | 41.4 | 10.6 | 30.7 | 6.25 | 79.1 | 57.99 |
| 1987 | 1,851,000 | 76,000 | 19,000 | 57,000 | 41.0 | 10.3 | 30.7 | 6.16 | 76.5 | 58.58 |
| 1988 | 1,906,000 | 78,000 | 19,000 | 59,000 | 40.7 | 10.0 | 30.7 | 6.11 | 74.2 | 59.14 |
| 1989 | 1,955,000 | 80,000 | 19,000 | 61,000 | 40.7 | 9.8 | 30.9 | 6.08 | 72.6 | 59.32 |
| 1990 | 2,006,000 | 82,000 | 19,000 | 62,000 | 40.6 | 9.6 | 31.0 | 6.06 | 71.0 | 59.77 |
| 1991 | 2,066,000 | 84,000 | 20,000 | 64,000 | 40.6 | 9.5 | 31.1 | 6.04 | 70.1 | 59.94 |
| 1992 | 2,148,000 | 87,000 | 20,000 | 67,000 | 40.6 | 9.4 | 31.3 | 6.04 | 69.5 | 60.26 |
| 1993 | 2,237,000 | 93,000 | 21,000 | 72,000 | 41.5 | 9.4 | 32.1 | 6.04 | 69.1 | 60.38 |
| 1994 | 2,315,000 | 95,000 | 22,000 | 73,000 | 40.9 | 9.4 | 31.6 | 5.92 | 68.9 | 60.34 |
| 1995 | 2,380,000 | 97,000 | 22,000 | 75,000 | 40.7 | 9.4 | 31.3 | 5.85 | 68.9 | 60.26 |
| 1996 | 2,429,000 | 97,000 | 23,000 | 74,000 | 39.6 | 9.4 | 30.2 | 5.71 | 69.1 | 60.06 |
| 1997 | 2,484,000 | 97,000 | 23,000 | 74,000 | 39.0 | 9.2 | 29.8 | 5.66 | 68.9 | 60.45 |
| 1998 | 2,551,000 | 98,000 | 23,000 | 75,000 | 38.4 | 9.1 | 29.4 | 5.57 | 68.8 | 60.61 |
| 1999 | 2,621,000 | 100,000 | 24,000 | 77,000 | 38.2 | 9.0 | 29.3 | 5.54 | 68.7 | 60.82 |
| 2000 | 2,695,000 | 102,000 | 24,000 | 78,000 | 37.8 | 8.9 | 28.9 | 5.46 | 68.5 | 61.03 |
| 2001 | 2,762,000 | 104,000 | 24,000 | 80,000 | 37.5 | 8.8 | 28.7 | 5.38 | 68.2 | 61.19 |
| 2002 | 2,822,000 | 105,000 | 25,000 | 80,000 | 37.0 | 8.7 | 28.3 | 5.29 | 68.0 | 61.27 |
| 2003 | 2,883,000 | 106,000 | 25,000 | 81,000 | 36.7 | 8.6 | 28.1 | 5.23 | 67.7 | 61.35 |
| 2004 | 2,947,000 | 109,000 | 25,000 | 84,000 | 36.8 | 8.5 | 28.2 | 5.19 | 67.0 | 61.59 |
| 2005 | 3,012,000 | 112,000 | 26,000 | 86,000 | 36.9 | 8.5 | 28.4 | 5.19 | 66.3 | 61.66 |
| 2006 | 3,081,000 | 115,000 | 26,000 | 89,000 | 37.1 | 8.4 | 30.2 | 5.19 | 65.2 | 61.89 |
| 2007 | 3,154,000 | 117,000 | 26,000 | 91,000 | 37.1 | 8.3 | 30.1 | 5.15 | 64.1 | 62.23 |
| 2008 | 3,233,000 | 121,000 | 27,000 | 94,000 | 37.2 | 8.2 | 29.0 | 5.15 | 62.7 | 62.40 |
| 2009 | 3,323,000 | 123,000 | 27,000 | 95,000 | 36.9 | 8.2 | 28.7 | 5.08 | 61.3 | 62.80 |
| 2010 | 3,419,000 | 126,000 | 28,000 | 97,000 | 36.8 | 8.3 | 28.4 | 5.04 | 59.8 | 63.11 |
| 2011 | 3,524,000 | 129,000 | 30,000 | 99,000 | 36.7 | 8.5 | 28.3 | 5.03 | 58.5 | 63.35 |
| 2012 | 3,636,000 | 132,000 | 31,000 | 101,000 | 36.4 | 8.6 | 27.8 | 4.99 | 57.2 | 63.58 |
| 2013 | 3,743,000 | 134,000 | 32,000 | 102,000 | 35.8 | 8.7 | 27.2 | 4.94 | 55.8 | 63.91 |
| 2014 | 3,843,000 | 137,000 | 32,000 | 105,000 | 35.5 | 8.3 | 27.2 | 4.89 | 54.4 | 64.16 |
| 2015 | 3,946,000 | 139,000 | 32,000 | 107,000 | 35.2 | 8.0 | 27.2 | 4.81 | 53.0 | 64.49 |
| 2016 | 4,052,000 | 141,000 | 31,000 | 110,000 | 34.8 | 7.7 | 27.1 | 4.74 | 51.7 | 64.77 |
| 2017 | 4,160,000 | 143,000 | 31,000 | 112,000 | 34.4 | 7.4 | 27.0 | 4.66 | 50.3 | 65.08 |
| 2018 | 4,271,000 | 146,000 | 31,000 | 115,000 | 34.2 | 7.2 | 26.9 | 4.61 | 49.1 | 65.31 |
| 2019 | 4,384,000 | 148,000 | 31,000 | 117,000 | 33.7 | 7.0 | 26.7 | 4.52 | 47.8 | 65.69 |
| 2020 | 4,533,000 | 164,000 | 29,000 | 135,000 | 35.7 | 6.4 | 29.3 | 4.91 | 33.7 | 66.8 |
| 2021 | 4,667,000 | 167,000 | 30,000 | 138,000 | 35.3 | 6.3 | 29.1 | 4.85 | 32.7 | 66.8 |
| 2022 | 4,803,000 | 170,000 | 27,000 | 142,000 | 34.8 | 5.6 | 29.2 | 4.77 | 31.7 | 64.53 |
| 2023 | 4,948,000 | 173,000 | 28,000 | 145,000 | 34.4 | 5.5 | 28.9 | 4.70 | 30.8 | 68.5 |

View source data.
View source data.
View source data.
View source data.

=== Demographic and Health Surveys ===
Total Fertility Rate (TFR) (Wanted Fertility Rate) and Crude Birth Rate (CBR):

| Year | Total | | Urban | | Rural | |
| Year | CBR | TFR | CBR | TFR | CBR | TFR |
|---|---|---|---|---|---|---|
| 2000–2001 | 32.1 | 4.7 (4.3) | 31.9 | 4.3 (3.9) | 32.1 | 5.0 (4.7) |
| 2003–2004 | | 4.6 | | 4.1 | | 5.1 |
| 2019–2021 | 35.5 | 5.2 (4.5) | 30.3 | 4.1 (3.6) | 40.2 | 6.4 (5.5) |

Fertility data as of 2010 (DHS Program):

| Zone | Total fertility rate | Percentage of women age 15-49 currently pregnant | Mean number of children ever born to women age 40–49 |
|---|---|---|---|
| Nouakchott | 4.3 | 8.0 | 5.7 |
| Sud-Est | 5.0 | 10.4 | 5.2 |
| Fleuve | 5.1 | 8.5 | 6.0 |
| Nord | 4.6 | 7.1 | 6.5 |
| Centre | 4.0 | 6.7 | 6.1 |

=== Life expectancy ===
| Period | Life expectancy in Years |
|---|---|
| 1950–1955 | 41.72 |
| 1955–1960 | ▲45.19 |
| 1960–1965 | ▲47.93 |
| 1965–1970 | ▲50.28 |
| 1970–1975 | ▼52.73 |
| 1975–1980 | ▲55.76 |
| 1980–1985 | ▲57.77 |
| 1985–1990 | ▲58.89 |
| 1990–1995 | ▲59.84 |
| 1995–2000 | ▲60.27 |
| 2000–2005 | ▲61.32 |
| 2005–2010 | ▲62.64 |
| 2010–2015 | ▲63.43 |

== Religion ==
Religion in Mauritania (ARDA 2020 est.)
1. Sunni (99.2%)
2. Ethnic Religion (0.46%)
3. Christianity (0.21%)
4. None (0.11%)

Official census figures identify 100% of Mauritanian citizens as Muslim.

In practice, approximately 99.2% of the population is Sunni Muslim following the Maliki school, with very small minorities, about 0.8%, made up of foreign residents practicing Christianity, Judaism, or other faiths.

== Ethnic groups ==
40% Black Moors (Haratin), 30% White Moors (Beidane), and Sub-Saharan Mauritanians (non-Arabic speaking, largely resident in or originating from the Senegal River Valley, including Zenaga, Fula, Soninke, Wolof, Bambara, and Serer ethnic groups.

== Languages ==
Arabic, Pulaar, Soninke and Wolof are the four national languages of Mauritania while Arabic, particularly spoken in the Hassaniya Arabic dialect, remains the sole official language. Other languages, such as Serer and French are also spoken. French is widely used in media and among educated classes.
