= Languages of Mauritania =

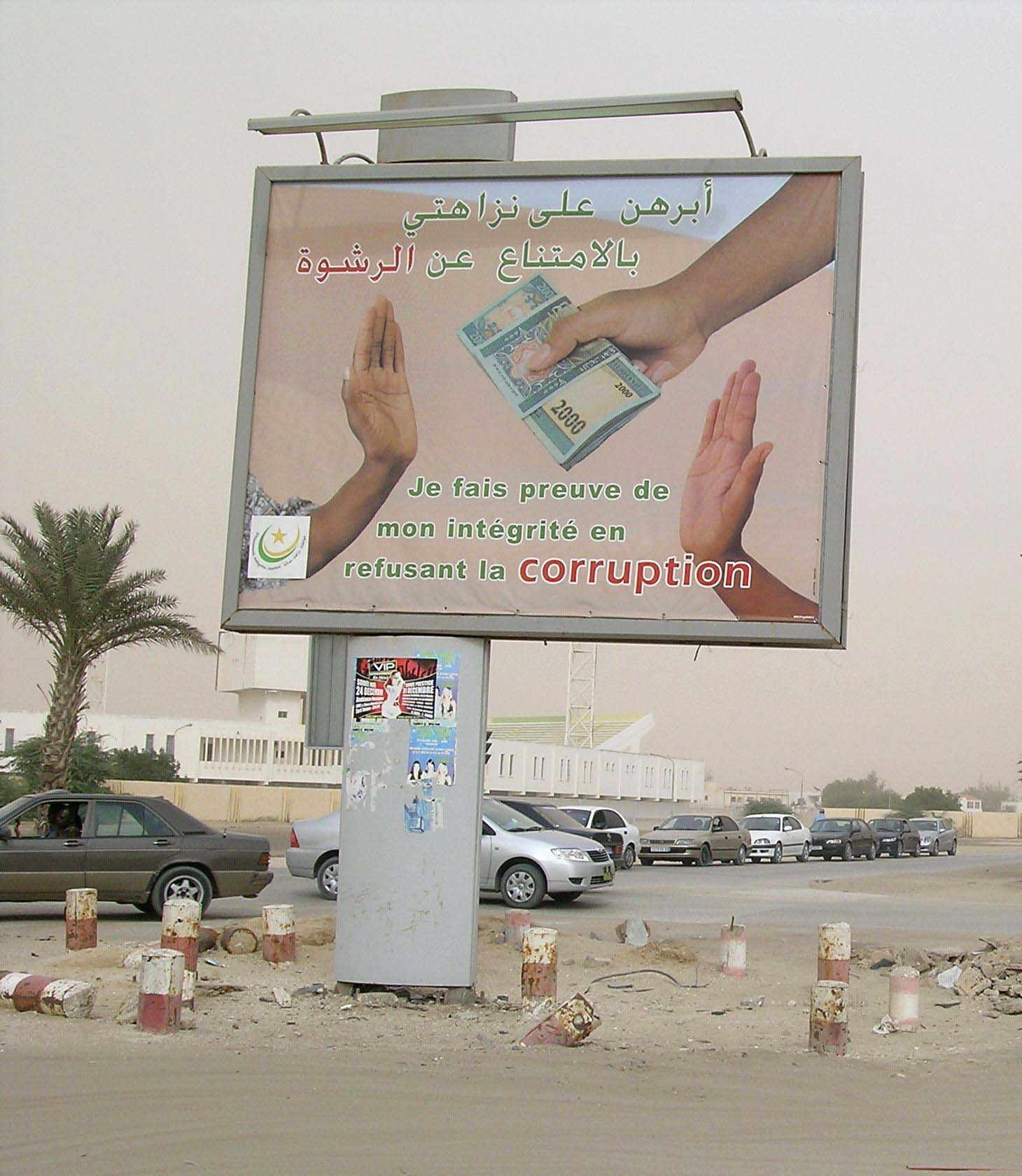
- Anti-corruption campaign in Nouakchott, in Arabic and French
- Official: Arabic (Modern Standard)
- National: Arabic, Pulaar, Soninke, Wolof
- Vernacular: Hassaniya Arabic
- Minority: Zenaga, Bambara, Tamasheq, Serer
- Signed: Francophone African Sign Language
- Keyboard layout: Arabic keyboard / AZERTY

The languages of Mauritania include the four national languages, Arabic, Pulaar, Soninke and Wolof while Arabic is the sole official language. French, a former official language, is sometimes used for working, education and administration.

The languages fall into two families: Afroasiatic languages, namely Hassaaniya Arabic and Standard written Arabic; and Niger-Congo languages, principally Pulaar, Soninke and Wolof.

== Arabic ==
- Arabic
  - Modern Standard Arabic is the official language of the government of Mauritania.
  - Hassaniyya Arabic (70–80% of the population) is the colloquial spoken variety of Arabic. Its name is derived from the tribe of the Bänū Ḥassān. The language serves as a lingua franca in the country. It is also the language of the Imraguen who also use elements of Soninke.

== Niger–Congo languages ==
The speakers of the Niger–Congo languages make up 20–30% of the population. There have been efforts by some Mauritanians to elevate the status of these languages as official languages, similar to Arabic.

- Pulaar (15%–20%) is spoken in Mauritania by the Fula and the Toucouleur.
- Soninke (7%–10%)
- Wolof(1%–3%)

== Other languages ==
=== French ===
According to Ethnologue, there are 705,500 speakers of French in Mauritania. It serves as a de facto national working language. Mauritania is a member of the International Organisation of La Francophonie (La Francophonie).

Sometimes French is used for certain speeches by parliamentarians in the Senate and the National Assembly, and they are broadcast on radio and television in this language. In certain areas of administration, it has undeniably established itself as the working language. For example, all structures of the Ministry of Finance (Customs, Taxes, Budget, Treasury, Domains, etc.) work in this language; at the Ministry of Health, it’s the same thing. The only exception that could be cited is the Ministry of Justice where Arabic undeniably predominates; the Ministry of the Interior and that of National Education are almost equal in terms of the use of the two languages which depends mainly on the training of the user.

However, here too, there are exceptions: for example, at the Ministry of the Interior, encrypted messages and at the Ministry of National Education, Baccalaureate transcripts are exclusively in French.

=== Berber ===
- Zenaga is a Berber language that was more widely spoken in the past, but is still used in the south of the country, close to the River Senegal. The speakers of the Zenaga language are eponymously known as Zenaga Berbers. Islamisation and Arabisation of the population have reduced the number of Berber speakers.
- Tamasheq is a Berber language spoken by Tuaregs in the extreme south-east of the country, who have moved into Mauritania from Mali.

== See also ==
- Hassaniya Arabic
- Mauritania
- Moors
