= Telephone numbers in Mauritania =

- Country: Mauritania
- Continent: Africa
- NSN length: 8
- Format: XXXX XXXX
- Country code: +222
- International access: 00
- Long-distance: n/a

The following are the telephone codes in Mauritania.

== Calling formats ==
- xxxx xxxx: Calls within Mauritania
- +222 xxxx xxxx: Calls from outside Mauritania

Prior to 2011, Mauritanian phone numbers consisted of seven digits; starting in 2011, the NSN length is 8 digits.

== List of area codes in Mauritania ==
List of area codes
Area Code	Area/City
250	Fixed line
258	Fixed line
45	Nouakchott
4513	Néma
4515	Aîoun
452	Fixed line
45000	Kaédi
4534	Sélibaby
4537	Aleg
4544	Zouérat
4546	Atar
4550	Boghé
4563	Kiffa
4569	Rosso/Tidjikja
457	Fixed line
4574	Nouadhibou

Mobile Telephone Numbers

Each mobile operator are assigned prefixes by blocks. The assignment varies by the operator.

Numbers are followed as the first two are prefixes followed by 6 digits.

eg. 24XXXXXX

List of Mobile Network Operators
Operator	Prefixes
Chinguitel	20,21,22,23,24,26,27,28,29
Mauritel	40,41,42,43,44,46,47,48,49
Mattel	30,31,32,33,34,36,37,38,39

List of service numbers
Service	Number
Fire brigade	18
Police	17
Speaking clock	16
Telephone inquiries	12
