= Azougui =

Azougui آزوكي Azuggi
- Site of medieval town
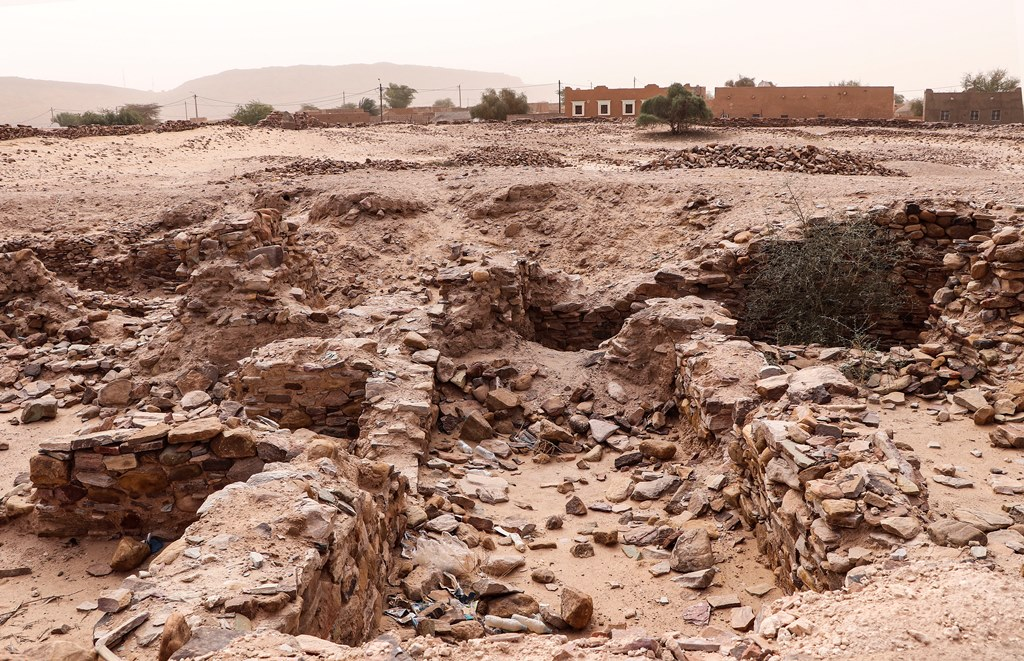
- Archaeological site

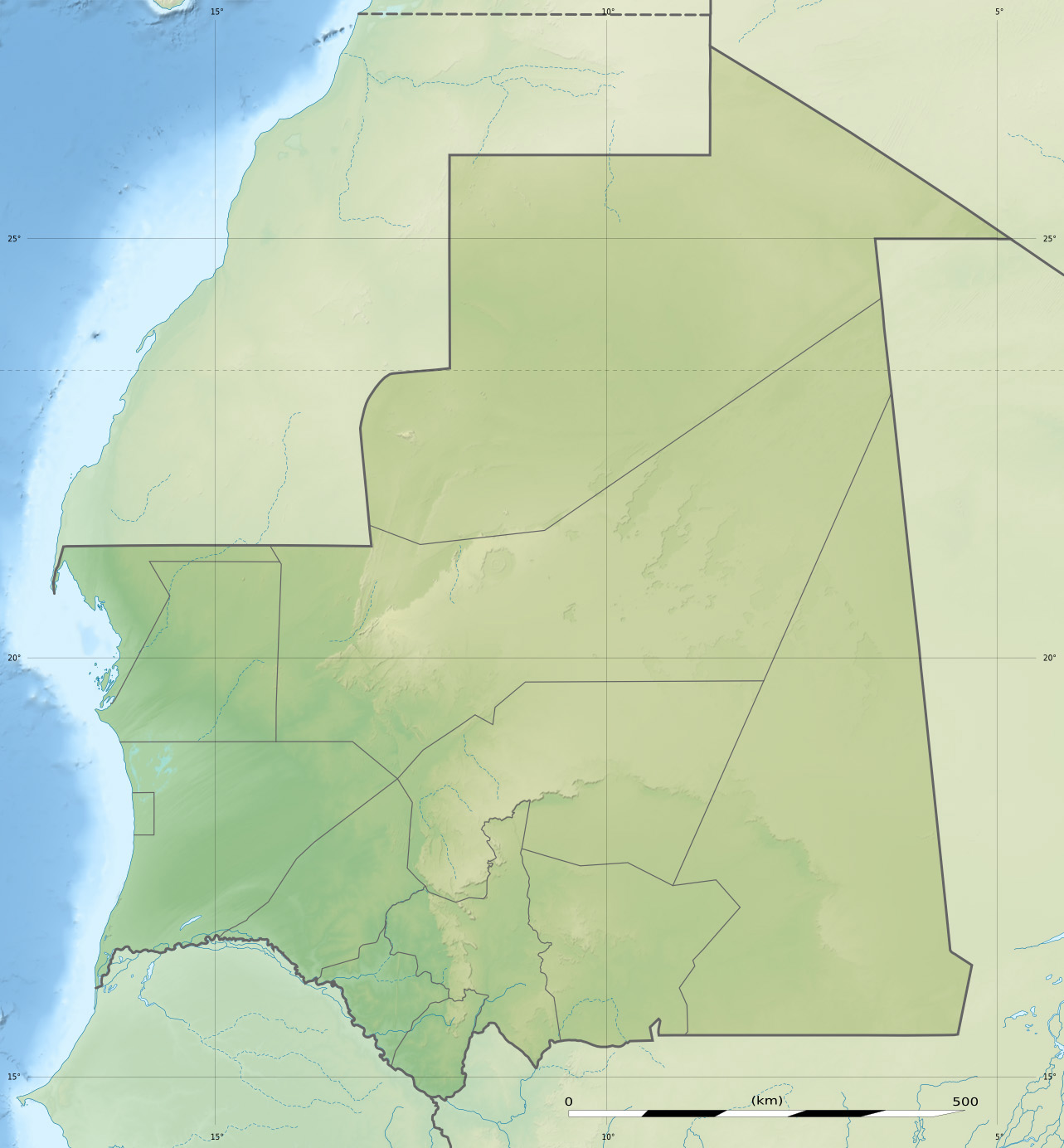
- Location within Mauritania
- Coordinates: 20°24′19″N 13°6′40″W
- Country: Mauritania
- Region: Adrar Region

Azougui (or Azuggi, Arabic: آزوكي, romanized: āzūkī, Hassaniyya: آزوگي, romanized: āzūgī) was a town in north-western Mauritania, lying on the Adrar Plateau, north-west of Atar. In the eleventh century it was the first capital of the Almoravid dynasty, who conquered a territory stretching from the Ghana Empire to Morocco and the Iberian Peninsula.

The chronicler al-Bakri (c. 1040–1094) claims a fortress "surrounded by 20,000 palms" was built here by Yannu ibn Umar, a brother of the first Almoravid chieftains, Yahya ibn Umar al-Lamtuni and Abu Bakr ibn Umar, and marked the frontier between the dominions of the Lamtuna and the Gudala. Both of them Berber Sanhaja desert tribes and one-time allies, the Lamtuna formed the core of the Almoravids after the Gudala broke away. It was near this location, at a place called Tabfarilla, that the early Almoravids suffered their first significant defeat, when the Gudala crushed an Almoravid Lamtuna army based in Azougui and killed their leader Yahya ibn Umar in 1056. Azougui and the nearby battlefield subsequently became a revered site for the Almoravids. Both al-Bakri and al-Zuhri, another chronicler writing in the 1150s, regarded Azougui as the capital of the Almoravids.

Al-Idrisi identified Azuggi as an essential stop on the trans-Saharan trade route between Morocco and Ghana ("Whoever wants to go to the countries of Sila, Takrur and Ghana in the land of the Sudan cannot avoid this town"). He also notes that the "Guineans" (prob. Soninke) called it "Quqadam".

The site is even older, as seventh century rock carvings attest. Parts of the citadel and the necropolis of al-Imam al-Hadrami survive.
