= Firawa mine =

Uranium mine in Mauritania

- Location: Mauritania
- Products: uranium

The Firawa mine is a large open pit mine located in the western part of Mauritania. Firawa represents one of the largest uranium reserves in Mauritania having estimated reserves of 30 million tonnes of ore grading 0.025% uranium.
