= Imam al-Hadrami =

Al-Imam al-Hadrami
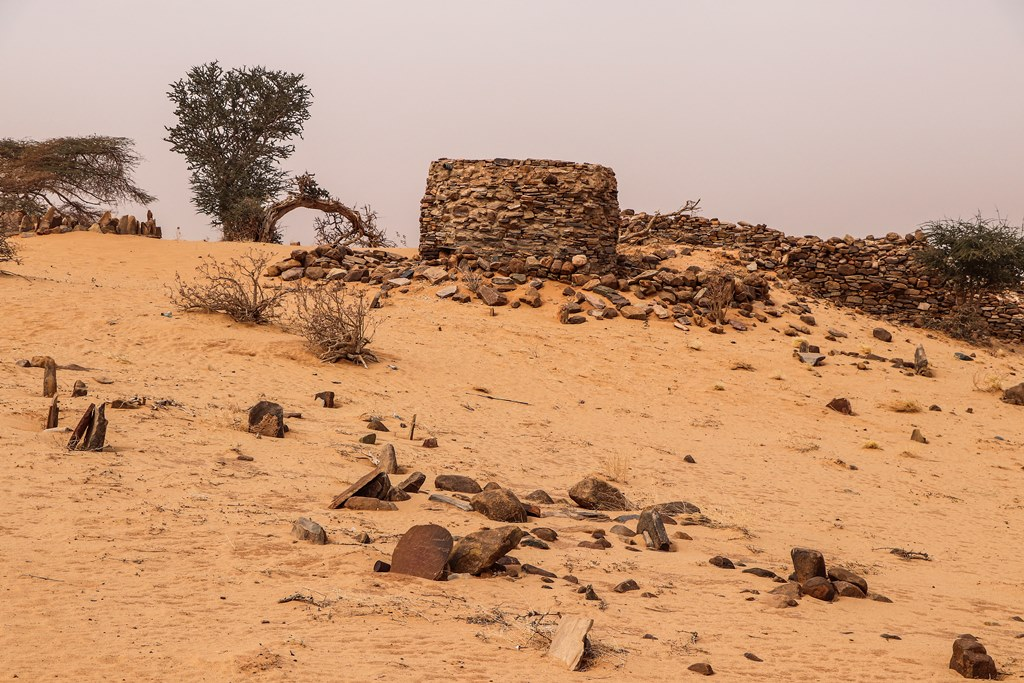
- The cenotaph of al-Hadrami at Azougui

Personal life
- Born: Kairouan
- Died: 1095 Azougui, Almoravid Dynasty
- Main interests: Theology; political science
- Notable work: Kitâb al-Ishâra

Religious life
- Religion: Islam

Abū Bakr Muḥammad ibn al-Ḥasan al-Murādī al-Ḥaḍramī (Arabic: أبو بكر محمد بن الحسن المرادي الحضرمي) or el Mûradi Al Hadrami or al-shaykh al imâm Al Hadrami was an 11th-century North African Islamic theologian and jurist. He died in 1095.

== Biography ==
Al-Hadrami was born in the city of Kairouan in present-day Tunisia to an Arab family with origins in the Hadramawt region of southern Arabia. In his native town he received his education, studying with a number of scholars, including Abu Imran al-Fasi. Ibn Bashkuwāl reports, that al-Hadrami stayed in 1094 for a brief of study in Córdoba.

After the Almoravid conquest of Azougui, close to Atar in present-day Mauritania by Abu Bakr ibn Umar, al-Hadrami followed him to that city. In Azougui he served as Qadi until his death in 1095.

He wrote several political and theological treatises.

From the second half of the 17th century, the memory of al-Hadrami began to reappear in Mauritanian local oral tradition, launched by the “rediscovery” of his grave at Azougui. In these folktales he is portrayed as a mystic Marabout and thaumaturgist.

== Works ==
Al-Hadrami has written several treatises in the field of theology and politics. His sole surviving work is Kitâb al-Ishâra (Book of politics or guidance on the administration of the principality), an ethical treatise of the mirrors for princes genre. It provides guidance on a range of topics such as good governance, the selection of advisers and companions, leadership on the battlefield, and occasions for clemency and pardon.

== Post-mortem recovery of the character of al-Hadrami ==
Launched by the “rediscovery” of his grave in the second half of the 17th century at Azougui by an individual of the Smasside tribe, the memory of al-Hadrami began to reappear and miracles have been attributed to him. Local oral tradition holds, that he played a decisive role in the Almoravid siege of Azougui. So, the primitive inhabitants of Azougui, the Bafour, hunted antelopes with packs of dogs, which were also used against their enemies. For this reason, the town was known as Madinat al-Kilab, the City of Dogs. According to oral tradition, al-Hadrami neutralized the dogs, allowing the Almoravids to conquer the region, although he died during the battle. Local tradition reports a second, "rediscovery" of al-Hadrami's tomb in the 18th century.

Beyond the eschatological significance of the “rediscovery”, scholars believe a strategy of legitimation in a territorial conquest, which pitted against each other the Smasside who had arrived from Chinguetti, and the local Idaysilli tribes.

In the cemetery, located about 300 m from the ruins of the Almoravid enclosure of Azougui, the cenotaph of al-Hadrami is still venerated. It is a small cubic volume of dry masonry without any decoration.

== Sources ==
- Paulo de Moraes Farias, The Almoravids: Some Questions Concerning the Character of the Movement During its Period of closest Contact with the Western Sudan, Bulletin IFAN, série B,29, nº 3-4 (1967):794-878.
- Mustapha Naïmi, La dynamique des alliances ouest-sahariennes, (in French) ISBN 978-2735110605.
- Pierre Bonté, Figures historiques de sainteté dans la société maure (in French) Retrieved 12 April 2020.
