= National Agency for Statistics, Demographic and Economic Analysis =

Mauritania's principal government institution in charge of statistics and census data

- Arabic: الوكالة الوطنية للإحصاء والتحليل الديموغرافي والاقتصادي; French: Agence Nationale de la Statistique, de l'Analyse Démographique et Economique
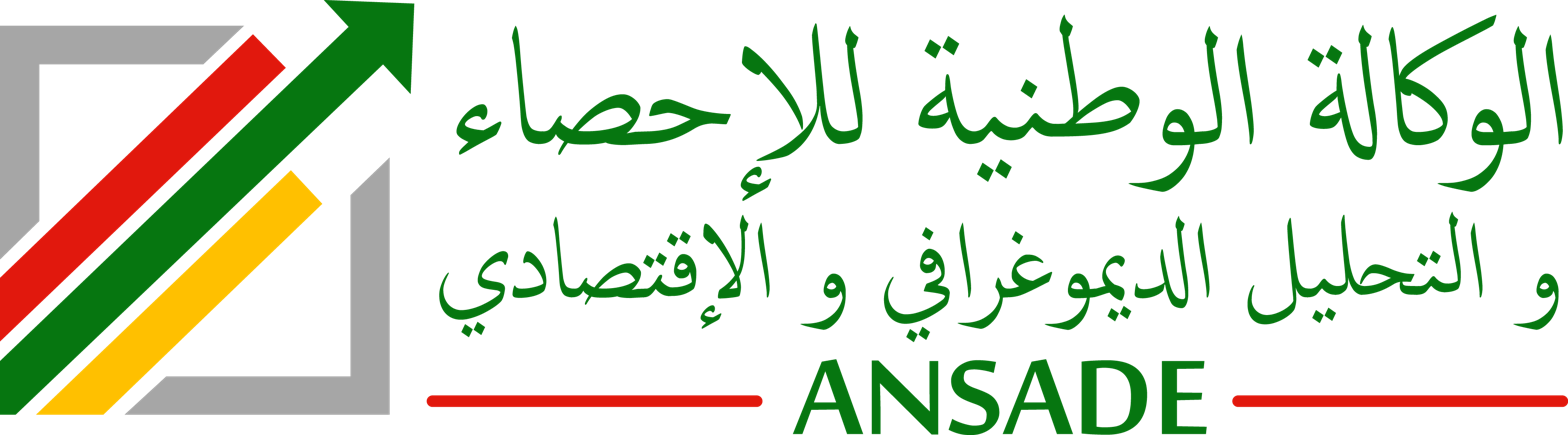

Agency overview
- Formed: 10 February 2021; 4 years ago
- Preceding agencies: National Office of Statistics; Mauritanian Center for Policy Analysis
- Type: Public establishment of an administrative nature
- Jurisdiction: Mauritania
- Headquarters: Tevragh Zeina, Nouakchott-Ouest; 18°6′49″N 15°58′54″W
- Minister responsible: Abdessalam Ould Mohamed Saleh, Minister of Economy and Sustainable Development
- Agency executives: Director General, Mohamed Moctar Ould Ahmed Sidi; Deputy Director General, Ba Omar
- Key document: Decree nº2021-027 (in Arabic and French)
- Website: ansade.mr

The National Agency for Statistics, Demographic and Economic Analysis (Arabic: الوكالة الوطنية للإحصاء والتحليل الديموغرافي والاقتصادي, French: Agence Nationale de la Statistique, de l'Analyse Démographique et Economique), abbreviated ANSADE, is the national statistics service of Mauritania, dependant on the Minister of Economy and Sustainable Development.

The agency, structured as an établissement public à caractère administratif, was created on 10 February 2021 through the merger of the former National Office of Statistics (ONS) and the Mauritanian Center for Policy Analysis, created with the intention of both improving the work of the former ONS and centralising data analysis conducted by other agencies into a single establishment.

The agency is responsible for establishing an integrated national system for collecting, processing, analysing and disseminating economic, demographic, social and environmental statistics, using either censuses, surveys or documents from the public or private sector.

The agency has been headed since its creation by Mohamed Moctar Ould Ahmed Sidi as Director General, who was the Director of the disestablished ONS. His Deputy Director General is Ba Omar.

ANSADE is a member of the Economic and Statistical Observatory of Sub-Saharan Africa (AFRISTAT).

== Purpose ==
According to the decree creating the agency, ANSADE is in charge of the following:

- The collection of data from households, businesses, administrations and all other statistical units;
- The recording and processing of this data according to criteria commonly used internationally and according to the needs expressed by all users;
- Conducting analytical studies on the basis of available statistical information, in relation to the different economic, demographic, social, cultural and environmental areas, in support of decision-making, by highlighting the causes of phenomena, their interrelations and their predictable evolution, in particular by using their modelling;
- The publication and dissemination of statistical information and analytical studies to all users, while ensuring its development through the use of new information and communication technologies;
- The coordination of the National Statistics System (SNS) in accordance with the provisions of paragraph 1 of Article 15 of Law nº2005-017 of 27 January 2005, relating to official statistics, and in particular the coordination of activities of the various organizations and structures responsible for statistics, the programming of statistical activities, the definition of concepts, nomenclatures, standards and the adoption of internationally recognized statistical methods;
- The organization of consultation between producers and users of statistical information in order to meet data needs and guarantee the availability of the requested statistics;
- The search for and establishment of mutually beneficial cooperative relations with national and foreign statistical institutions, particularly with regional and sub-regional statistical institutions with a view to the harmonization and improvement of the methodologies used;
- Contributing to the national effort in scientific research through specialized studies and the development of survey methodologies adapted to the context of the country;
- Support for the organization of initial and continuing training for personnel working in the field of statistics and demography, the promotion of research and the dissemination of statistical culture.
