= Mauritania =

Country in West Africa

Islamic Republic of Mauritania الجمهورية الإسلامية الموريتانية (Arabic) al-Jumhūriyyah al-Islāmiyyah al-Mūrītāniyyah
- Flag Seal
- Motto: شرف، إخاء، عدل "Honor, Fraternity, Justice"
- Anthem: النشيد الوطني الموريتاني "National Anthem of Mauritania"
- Capital and largest city: Nouakchott; 18°09′N 15°58′W
- Official languages: Arabic
- Recognized national languages: Arabic; Pulaar; Soninke; Wolof
- Ethnic groups: 40% Haratin; 30% Beidane; 30% Halpulaar, Fulani, Soninké, and Wolof
- Religion: Sunni Islam (official)
- Demonym: Mauritanian
- Government: Unitary semi-presidential Islamic republic
  - President: Mohamed Ould Ghazouani
  - Prime Minister: Mokhtar Ould Djay
  - President of the National Assembly: Mohamed Ould Meguett
- Legislature: National Assembly

Independence from France
  - Republic established: 28 November 1958
  - Independence from France: 28 November 1960
  - Current constitution: 12 July 1991

Area
  - Total: 1,030,000 km^{2} (400,000 sq mi) (28th)

Population
  - 2026 estimate: ▲5,461,319 (123rd)
  - Density: 3.4/km^{2} (8.8/sq mi) (231st)
- GDP (PPP): 2025 estimate
  - Total: ▲$40.060 billion (143rd)
  - Per capita: ▲$8,650 (130th)
- GDP (nominal): 2025 estimate
  - Total: ▲$11.470 billion (149th)
  - Per capita: ▲$2,480 (144th)
- Gini (2014): ▼32.6 medium inequality
- HDI (2023): ▼0.563 medium (163rd)
- Currency: Ouguiya (MRU)
- Time zone: UTC±00:00 (GMT)
- Calling code: +222
- ISO 3166 code: MR
- Internet TLD: .mr
- 1. According to Article 6 of the Constitution: "The national languages are Arabic, Pulaar, Soninke, and Wolof; the official language is Arabic."

Mauritania, (Note: /ˌmɒrɪˈteɪniə/; Arabic: موريتانيا, romanized: Mūrītānyā) officially the Islamic Republic of Mauritania, (Note: Arabic: الجمهورية الإسلامية الموريتانية, romanized: al-Jumhūriyyah al-Islāmiyyah al-Mūrītāniyyah) is a country in the Maghreb region of West Africa. It is bordered by the Atlantic Ocean to the west, Western Sahara to the north and northwest, Algeria to the northeast, Mali to the east and southeast, and Senegal to the southwest. By land area Mauritania is the 11th-largest country in Africa and the 28th-largest in the world; 90% of its territory is in the Sahara desert. Most of its population of 5.4 million live in the temperate south of the country; roughly a third of the population is concentrated in the capital and largest city, Nouakchott, on the Atlantic coast.

The country's name derives from Mauretania, the Latin name for a region, to the north, in the ancient Mediterranean Maghreb. Mauretania extended from central present-day northern Algeria to the Atlantic, in Morocco. Berbers occupied what is now Mauritania by the beginning of the 3rd century CE. Groups of Arab tribes migrated to this area in the late 7th century, bringing with them Islam, Arab culture, and the Arabic language. In the early 20th century, Mauritania was colonized by France as part of French West Africa. It achieved independence in 1960. The country has since experienced recurrent coups and periods of military dictatorship. The 2008 Mauritanian coup d'état was led by General Mohamed Ould Abdel Aziz, who won subsequent presidential elections in 2009 and 2014. He was succeeded by General Mohamed Ould Ghazouani following the 2019 elections, in what was considered the country's first peaceful transition of power since independence. Mauritania has a poor human rights record, particularly because of its perpetuation of slavery; the 2023 Global Slavery Index estimates there are about 149,000 slaves in the country (or 32 per 1,000 people).

Despite an abundance of natural resources, Mauritania remains poor; its economy is based primarily on agriculture and fishing. Mauritania is culturally and politically part of the Arab world as a member of the Arab League. Arabic is the official language, while Pulaar, Soninke and Wolof are recognized as national languages. The state religion is Islam, and almost all inhabitants are Sunni Muslims. Despite its prevailing Arab identity, Mauritanian society is multiethnic. The Haratin make up 40% of the population, while the Bidhan make up 30%. The remaining 30% consists of various sub-Saharan ethnic groups.

== Etymology ==
Mauritania takes its name from the ancient Berber kingdom that flourished beginning in the third century BC and later became the Roman province of Mauretania, which flourished into the seventh century AD. The two territories do not overlap, though; historical Mauretania was considerably farther north than modern Mauritania, as it was spread out along the entire western half of the Mediterranean coast of Africa. The term "Mauretania", in turn, derives from the Greek and Roman exonym for the Berber peoples of the kingdom, the Mauri people. The word "Mauri" is also the root of the name for the Moors.

It was more commonly known to Arab geographers as Bilad Chinqit (Arabic: بلاد شنقيط), "the land of Chinguetti". The term "Mauritanie occidentale" was officially used in a ministerial circular in 1899; it is based on a proposal by Xavier Coppolani, a French military and colonial administrator, who was instrumental in the colonial occupation and creation of modern-day Mauritania. This term, employed by the French, gradually replaced other designations previously used for referring to the country.

== History ==
=== Early history ===
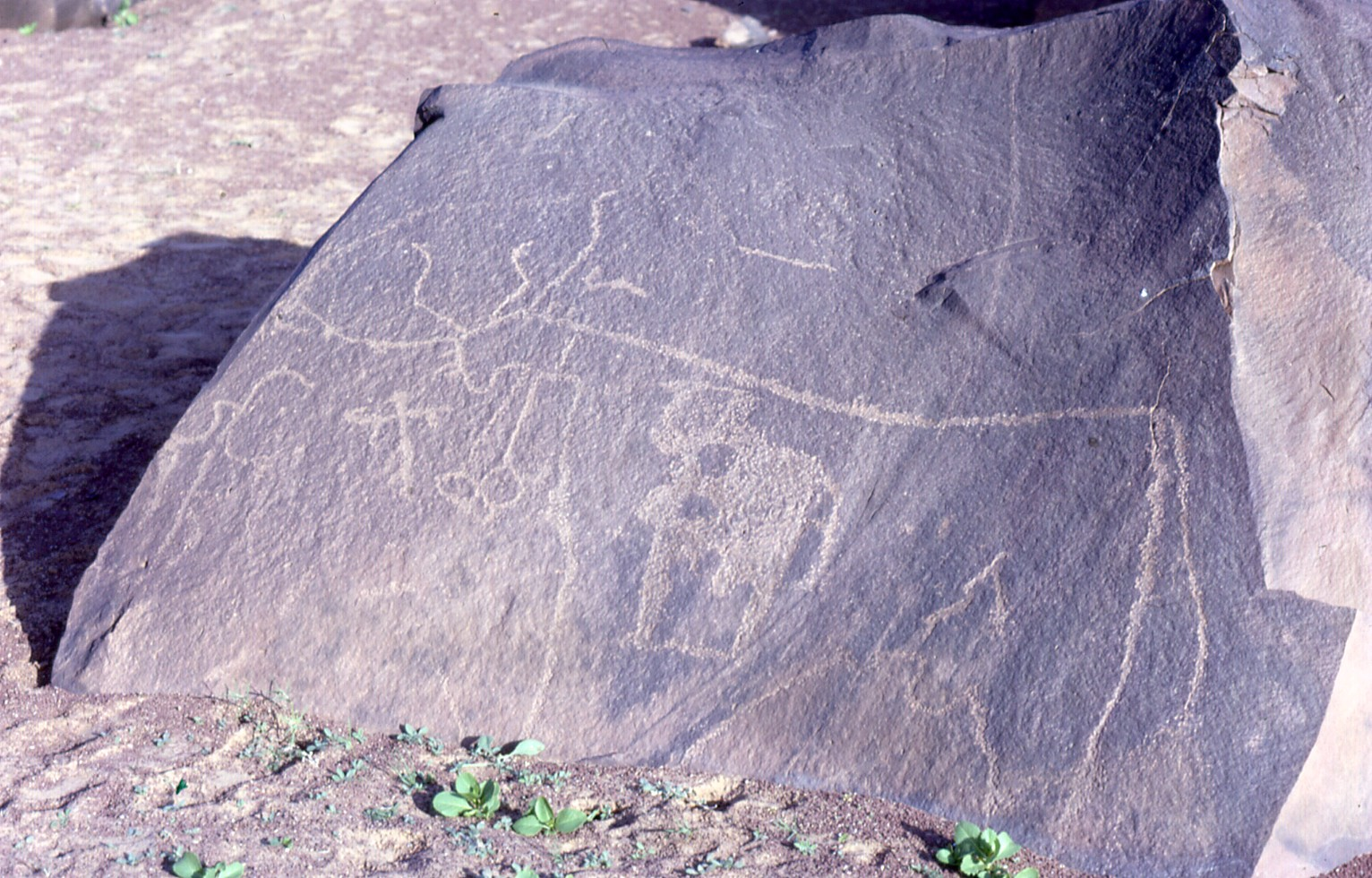
Rock art in the Sahara Desert

The ancient tribes of Mauritania were the Niger-Congo, and Bafour peoples. The Bafour were among the first Saharan peoples to abandon their previously nomadic lifestyle and adopt a primarily agricultural one. In response to the gradual desertification of the Sahara, they eventually migrated southward. The Bafour peoples were displaced by the Berber people when that group arrived in the 3rd to 7th centuries. Many of the Berber tribes have claimed to have Yemeni (and sometimes other Arab) origins. Little evidence supports those claims; however, a 2000 DNA study of the Yemeni people suggested that some ancient connection might exist between the peoples.

The Umayyads were the first Arab Muslims to enter Mauritania. During the Islamic conquests, they made incursions into Mauritania and were established in the region by the end of the seventh century. Many Berber tribes in Mauritania fled the arrival of the Arabs to the Gao region in Mali.

Other peoples also migrated south past the Sahara and into West Africa. In the 11th century, several nomadic Berber confederations in the desert regions overlapping present-day Mauritania joined to form the Almoravid movement. They expanded north and south, spawning an important empire that stretched from the Sahara to the Iberian Peninsula in Europe. According to a disputed Arab tradition, the Almoravids traveled south and conquered the ancient and extensive Ghana Empire around 1076.

The history of writing in Mauritania dates back to the Almoravid period. Al-Ḥaḍramī served as qadi in Azougui in the late 11th century, and was known for his great skill in elegant writing and speaking. He wrote a book on good princely conduct (Kitāb al-Išāra ilā Adab al-Imāra), with the first chapter devoted to the importance of reading and learning. Manuscript copies of this book can still be found in libraries in Mauritania today, where the lack of local paper production and the infrequent use of parchment may explain the absence of other surviving written works before the 16th century.

From 1644 to 1674, the indigenous peoples of the area that is modern Mauritania made what became their final effort to repel the Maqil Arabs who were invading their territory. This effort, which was unsuccessful, is known as the Char Bouba War. The invaders were led by the Beni Hassan tribe. The descendants of the Beni Hassan warriors became the upper stratum of Moorish society. Hassaniya, a bedouin Arabic dialect named for the Beni Hassan, became the dominant language among the largely nomadic population.

=== Colonial history ===
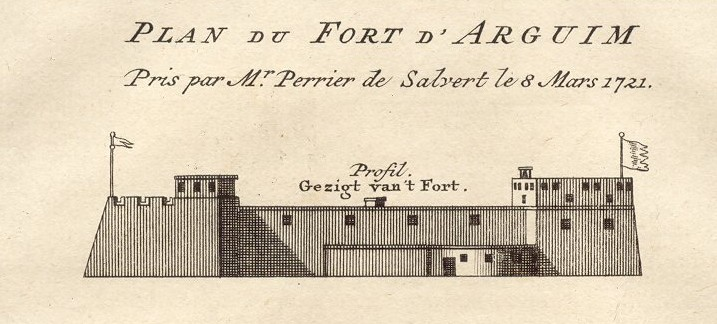
The Portuguese Empire ruled Arguin (Portuguese: Arguim) from 1445, after Prince Henry the Navigator set up a feitoria, until 1633.

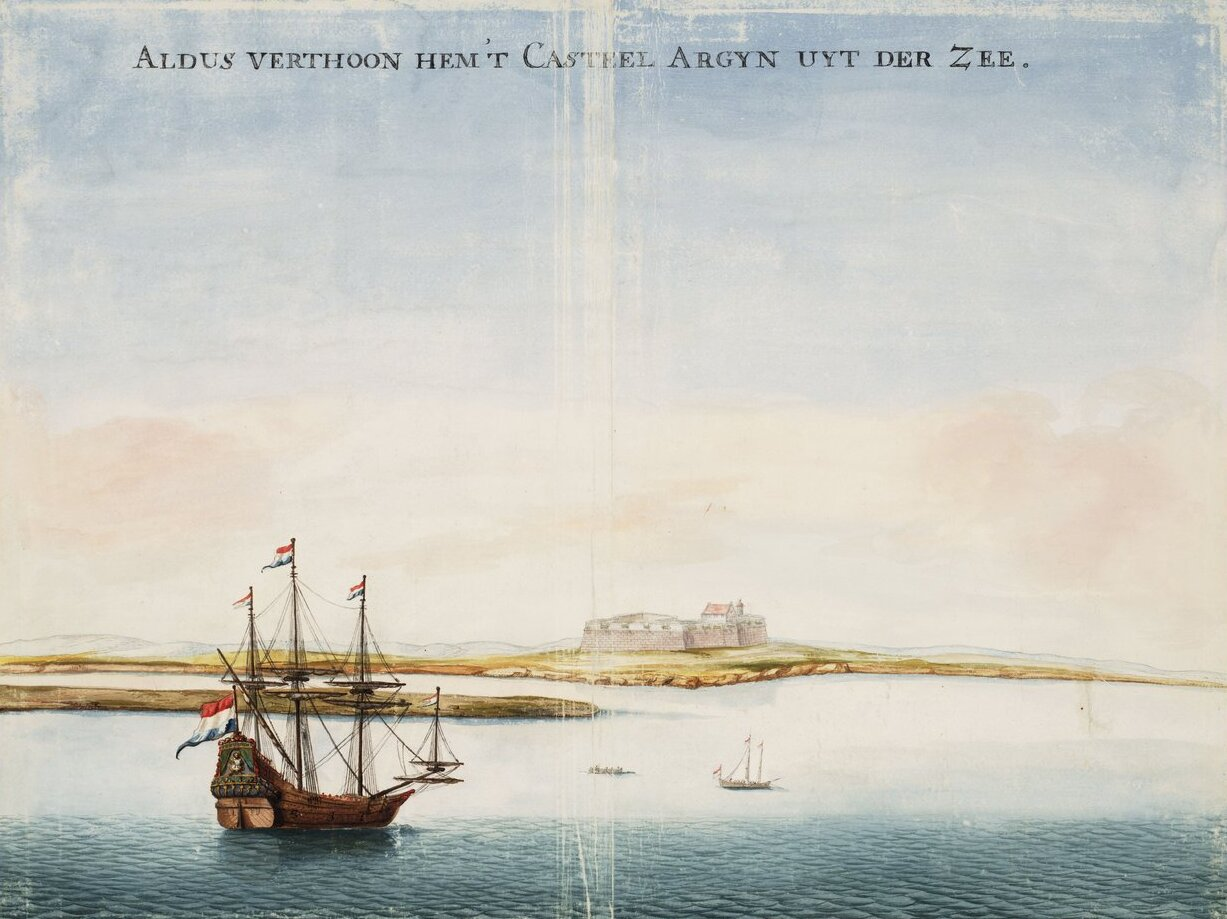
After the Portuguese, the Dutch, and then the French, took control of Arguin until abandoning it in 1685.

Starting in the late 19th century, France laid claim to the territories of present-day Mauritania, from the Senegal River area northwards. In 1901, Xavier Coppolani took charge of the imperial mission. Through a combination of strategic alliances with Zawaya tribes and military pressure on the Hassane warrior nomads, he managed to extend French rule over the Mauritanian emirates. Beginning in 1903 and 1904, the French armies succeeded in occupying Trarza, Brakna, and Tagant. However the northern emirate of Adrar held out longer; the emirate was aided by the anticolonial rebellion (or jihad) of shaykh Maa al-Aynayn and by insurgents from Tagant and the other occupied regions. In 1904, France organized the territory of Mauritania, and it became part of French West Africa, first as a protectorate and later as a colony. In 1912, the French armies defeated Adrar, and incorporated it into the territory of Mauritania.

French rule brought legal prohibitions against slavery and an end to interclan warfare. During the colonial period 90% of the population remained nomadic. Gradually many individuals belonging to sedentary peoples, whose ancestors had been expelled centuries earlier, began to migrate into Mauritania. Until 1902, the capital of French West Africa was in modern-day Senegal. It was first established at Saint-Louis and later, from 1902 to 1960, in Dakar. When Senegal gained its independence that year, France chose Nouakchott as the site of the new capital of Mauritania. At the time, Nouakchott was little more than a fortified village (or ksar).

After Mauritanian independence, larger numbers of indigenous sub-Saharan African peoples (Haalpulaar, Soninke, and Wolof) immigrated, with most of them settling in the area north of the Senegal River. Many of these new arrivals had been educated in the French language and customs, and became clerks, soldiers, and administrators in the new state. At the same time, the French were militarily suppressing the most intransigent Hassane tribes in the north. French pressure on those tribes altered the existing balance of power, and new conflicts arose between the southern populations and the Moors.

The great Sahel droughts of the early 1970s caused massive devastation in Mauritania, exacerbating problems of poverty and conflict. The arabized dominant elites reacted to changing circumstances, and to Arab nationalist calls from abroad, by increasing pressure to arabize many aspects of Mauritanian life, such as law and the education system. This was also a reaction to the consequences of the French domination under the colonial rule. Various models for maintaining the country's cultural diversity have been suggested, but none have been successfully implemented.

This ethnic discord was evident during intercommunal violence that broke out in April 1989 (the "Mauritania–Senegal Border War"); the conflict has since subsided. Mauritania expelled some 70,000 sub-Saharan African Mauritanians in the late 1980s. Ethnic tensions and the sensitive issue of slavery – past and, in some areas, present – are still powerful themes in the country's political debate. A significant number from all groups seek a more diverse, pluralistic society.

=== Conflict with Western Sahara ===
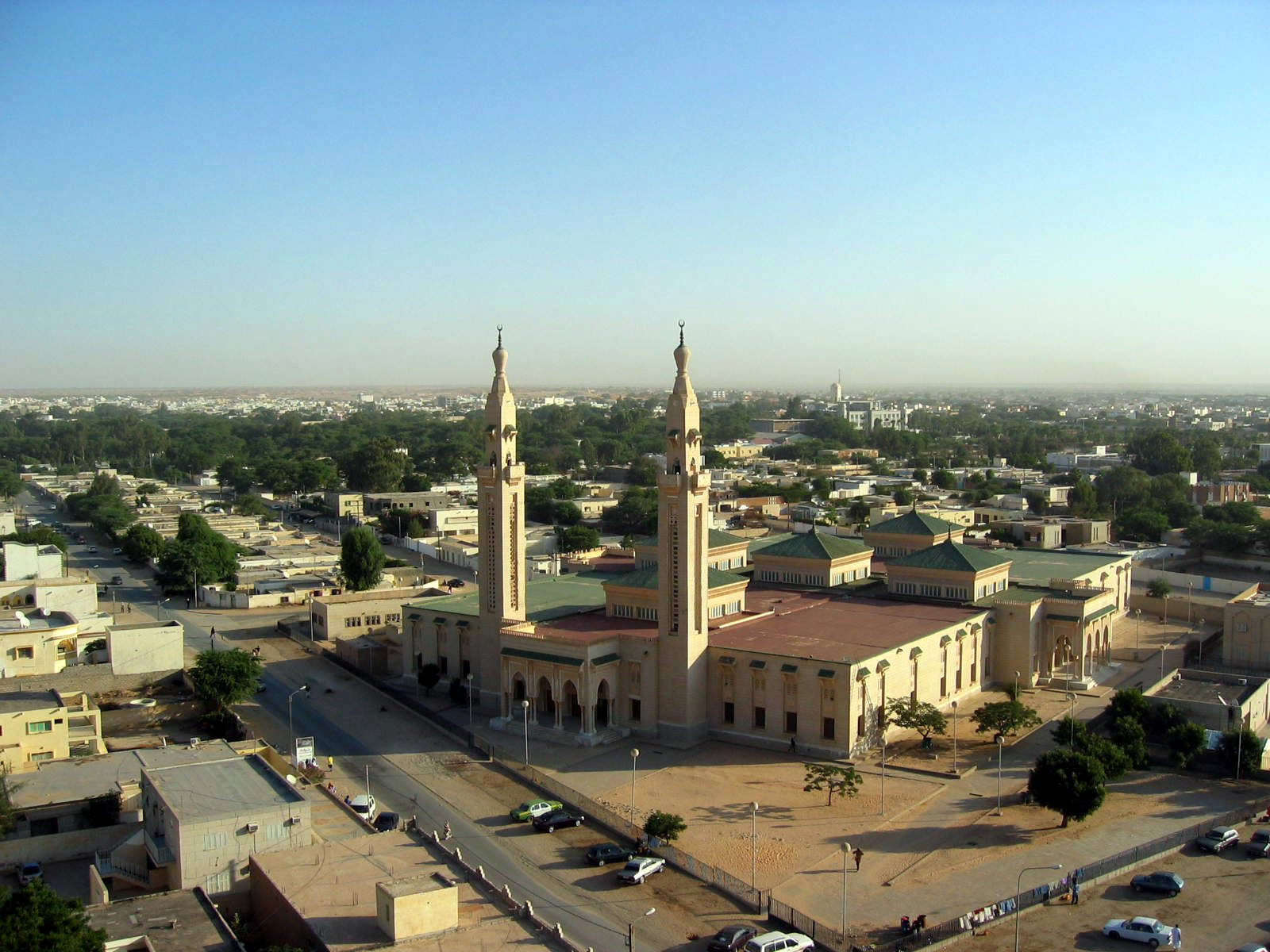
Nouakchott is the capital and largest city of Mauritania. It is one of the largest cities in the Sahara.

The International Court of Justice concluded that in spite of some evidence of both Morocco's and Mauritania's legal ties prior to Spanish colonization, neither set of ties was sufficient to affect the application of the UN General Assembly Declaration on the Granting of Independence to Colonial Countries and Peoples to Western Sahara.

In 1976, Mauritania, along with Morocco, annexed the territory of Western Sahara. After several military losses to the Polisario–heavily armed and supported by Algeria, the regional power and rival to Morocco–Mauritania withdrew in 1979. Its claims were taken over by Morocco. Due to economic weakness, Mauritania has been a negligible player in the territorial dispute, with its official position being that it wishes for an expedient solution that is mutually agreeable to all parties.

While most of Western Sahara has been occupied by Morocco, the UN still considers the Western Sahara a territory that needs to express its wishes with respect to statehood. A referendum, originally scheduled for 1992, is still supposed to be held at some point in the future, under UN auspices, to determine whether or not the indigenous Sahrawis wish to be independent, as the Sahrawi Arab Democratic Republic, or to be part of Morocco.

=== Ould Daddah era (1960–1978) ===
In 1960, Mauritania became an independent nation. In 1964, President Moktar Ould Daddah, originally installed by the French, formalized Mauritania as a one-party state with a new constitution, setting up an authoritarian presidential regime. Daddah's own Parti du Peuple Mauritanien became the ruling organization in a one-party system. The President justified this on the grounds that Mauritania was not ready for western style multiparty democracy. Under this one-party constitution, Daddah was re-elected in uncontested elections in 1976 and 1978.

Daddah was ousted in a bloodless coup on 10 July 1978. He had brought the country to near-collapse through the disastrous war to annex the southern part of Western Sahara; this potential annexation was framed as an attempt to create a "Greater Mauritania".

=== CMRN and CMSN military governments (1978–1984) ===
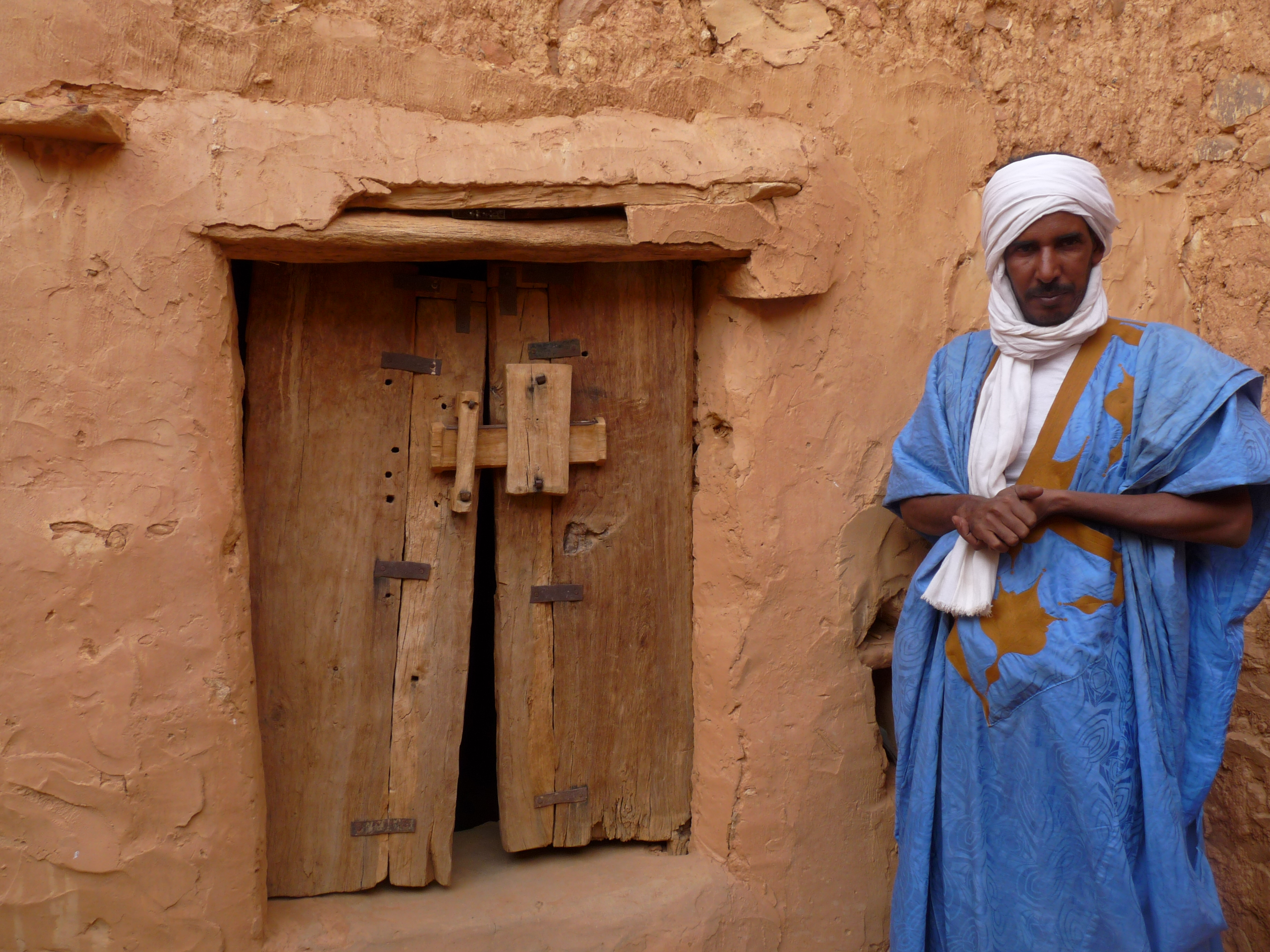
Chinguetti was a center of Islamic scholarship in West Africa.

Mustafa Ould Salek's Military Committee for National Recovery proved incapable of either establishing a strong base of power or extracting the country from its destabilizing conflict with the Sahrawi resistance movement, the Polisario Front. It quickly fell, to be replaced by another military government, the Military Committee for National Salvation.

Colonel Mohamed Khouna Ould Haidallah soon emerged as its strongman. By giving up all claims to Western Sahara, he found peace with the Polisario and improved relations with its main backer, Algeria; however, relations with Morocco, the other party to the conflict, and its European ally France, deteriorated. Instability continued, and Haidallah's ambitious reform attempts foundered. His regime was plagued by attempted coups and intrigue within the military establishment. It became increasingly contested due to his harsh and uncompromising measures against opponents; many dissidents were jailed, and some executed.

Slavery in Mauritania still exists, despite being officially abolished three times: in 1905, 1981, and again in August 2007. Anti-slavery activists are persecuted, imprisoned and tortured.

In 1981, United States newspapers mistakenly reported that the Central Intelligence Agency planned a covert operation to overthrow the government of Mauritania as part of the U.S. Cold War strategy. Journalist Bob Woodward later wrote that the mistake was made by "White House aides unfamiliar with the world" who meant to leak news about an operation planned for Mauritius.

=== Ould Taya's rule (1984–2005) ===
In December 1984, Haidallah was deposed by Colonel Maaouya Ould Sid'Ahmed Taya, who, while retaining tight military control, relaxed the political climate. Ould Taya moderated Mauritania's previous pro-Algerian stance, and re-established ties with Morocco during the late 1980s. He deepened these ties during the late 1990s and early 2000s, as part of Mauritania's drive to attract support from Western states and Western-aligned Arab states. Its position on the Western Sahara conflict has been, since the 1980s, one of strict neutrality.

The Mauritania–Senegal Border War started as a result of a conflict in Diawara between Moorish Mauritanian herders and Senegalese farmers over grazing rights. On 9 April 1989, Mauritanian guards killed two Senegalese.

Following the incident, several riots erupted in Bakel, Dakar and other towns in Senegal, directed against the mainly Arabized Mauritanians who dominated the local retail business. The rioting, adding to the already existing tensions, led to a campaign of terror against black Mauritanians; black Mauritanians are often seen as "Senegalese" by the Bidān (White Moors), regardless of their nationality. As low scale conflict with Senegal continued into 1990–91, the Mauritanian government engaged in and encouraged acts of violence and seizures of property directed against the Halpularen ethnic group. The tension culminated in an international airlift agreed to by Senegal and Mauritania under international pressure to prevent further violence. The Mauritanian Government expelled thousands of black Mauritanians. Most of these so-called "Senegalese" had few or no ties with Senegal, and many have been repatriated from Senegal and Mali after 2007. The exact number of expulsions is not known; however, the United Nations High Commissioner for Refugees (UNHCR) estimated that, as of June 1991, 52,995 Mauritanian refugees were living in Senegal and at least 13,000 in Mali.

Opposition parties were legalized, and a new Constitution approved in 1991 which put an end to formal military rule. But President Ould Taya's election wins were dismissed as fraudulent by some opposition groups.

In the late 1980s, Ould Taya had established close co-operation with Iraq, and pursued a strongly Arab nationalist line. Mauritania grew increasingly isolated internationally; tensions with Western countries grew dramatically after it took a pro-Iraqi position during the 1991 Gulf War.

During the mid-to late 1990s, Mauritania shifted its foreign policy to one of increased co-operation with the United States and Europe. It was rewarded with diplomatic normalization and aid projects. On 28 October 1999, Mauritania joined Egypt, Palestine, and Jordan as the only members of the Arab League at that time to officially recognize Israel.

President Ould Taya began to clamp down on Islamic extremists in the country, and to co-operate with the U.S. in anti-terrorism activities.

Under Ould Taya’s leadership, Mauritania developed economically, oil was discovered in 2001 by the Woodside Company.

=== August 2005 military coup ===
On 3 August 2005, a military coup led by Colonel Ely Ould Mohamed Vall ended President Maaouya Ould Sid'Ahmed Taya's 21 years of rule. Taking advantage of Ould Taya's attendance at the funeral of Saudi King Fahd, the military, including members of the presidential guard (BASEP), seized control of key points in the capital Nouakchott. The coup proceeded without loss of life. Calling themselves the Military Council for Justice and Democracy, the officers released the following statement:

The national armed forces and security forces have unanimously decided to put a definitive end to the oppressive activities of the defunct authority, which our people have suffered from during the past years.

The Military Council later issued another statement naming Colonel Ould Mohamed Vall as president and director of the national police force, the Sûreté Nationale. Vall, once regarded as a firm ally of the now-ousted president, had aided Ould Taya in the coup that had originally brought him to power, and had later served as his Security Chief. Sixteen other officers were listed as members of the council.

Though cautiously watched by the international community, the coup came to be generally accepted, with the military junta organizing elections within a promised two-year timeline. In a referendum on 26 June 2006, 97% of Mauritanians approved a new constitution that limited the duration of a president's stay in office. The leader of the junta, Col. Vall, promised to abide by the referendum and relinquish power peacefully. Mauritania's establishment of relations with Israel – it was one of only three Arab states to recognize Israel – was maintained by the new regime, despite widespread criticism from the opposition. Parliamentary and municipal elections in Mauritania took place on 19 November and 3 December 2006.

=== 2007 presidential elections ===
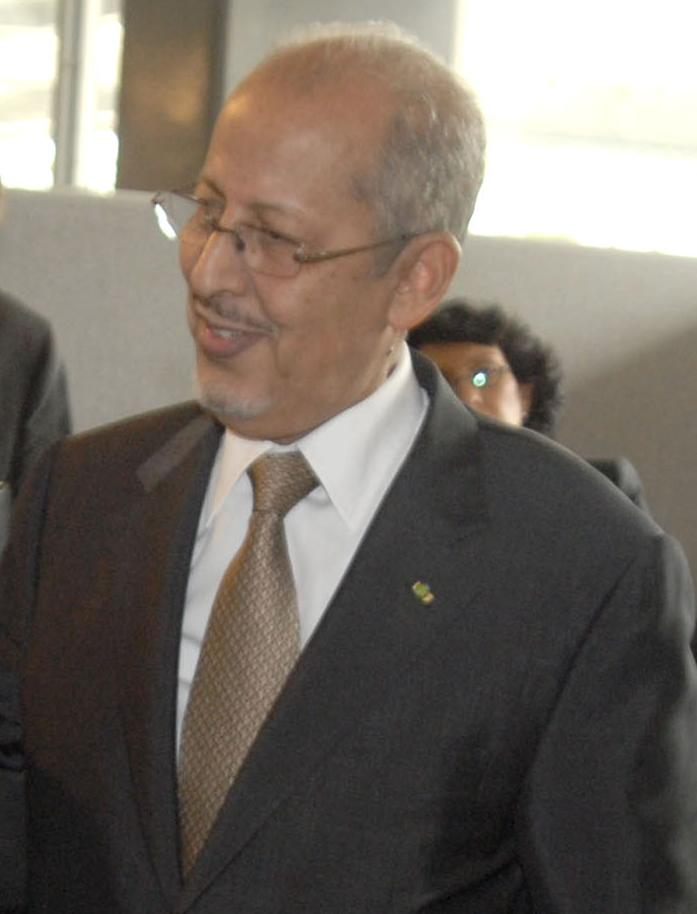
Sidi Ould Cheikh Abdallahi

Mauritania's first fully democratic presidential elections took place on 11 March 2007. The elections effected the final transfer from military to civilian rule following the military coup in 2005. This was the first time since Mauritania gained independence in 1960 that it elected a president in a multi-candidate election.

The elections were won in a second round of voting by Sidi Ould Cheikh Abdallahi.

=== 2008 military coup ===
On 6 August 2008, the head of the presidential guards took over the president's palace in Nouakchott, a day after 48 lawmakers from the ruling party resigned in protest of President Abdallahi's policies. The Army surrounded key government facilities, including the state television building, after the president fired senior officers, one of them the head of the presidential guards. The President, Prime Minister Yahya Ould Ahmed Waghef, and Mohamed Ould R'zeizim, Minister of Internal Affairs, were arrested.

The coup was coordinated by General Mohamed Ould Abdel Aziz, former chief of staff of the Mauritanian Army and head of the presidential guard, who had recently been fired. Mauritania's presidential spokesman, Abdoulaye Mamadouba, said the President, Prime Minister, and Interior Minister had been arrested by renegade senior Mauritanian army officers and were being held under house arrest at the presidential palace in the capital.

In the apparently successful and bloodless coup, Abdallahi's daughter, Amal Mint Cheikh Abdallahi, said: "The security agents of the BASEP (Presidential Security Battalion) came to our home and took away my father." The coup plotters, all dismissed in a presidential decree shortly beforehand, included Ould Abdel Aziz, General Muhammad Ould Al-Ghazwani, General Philippe Swikri, and Brigadier General (Aqid) Ahmed Ould Bakri.

=== 2008–2018 ===
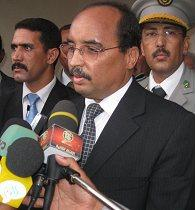
Mohamed Ould Abdel Aziz in his hometown, Akjoujt, on 15 March 2009.

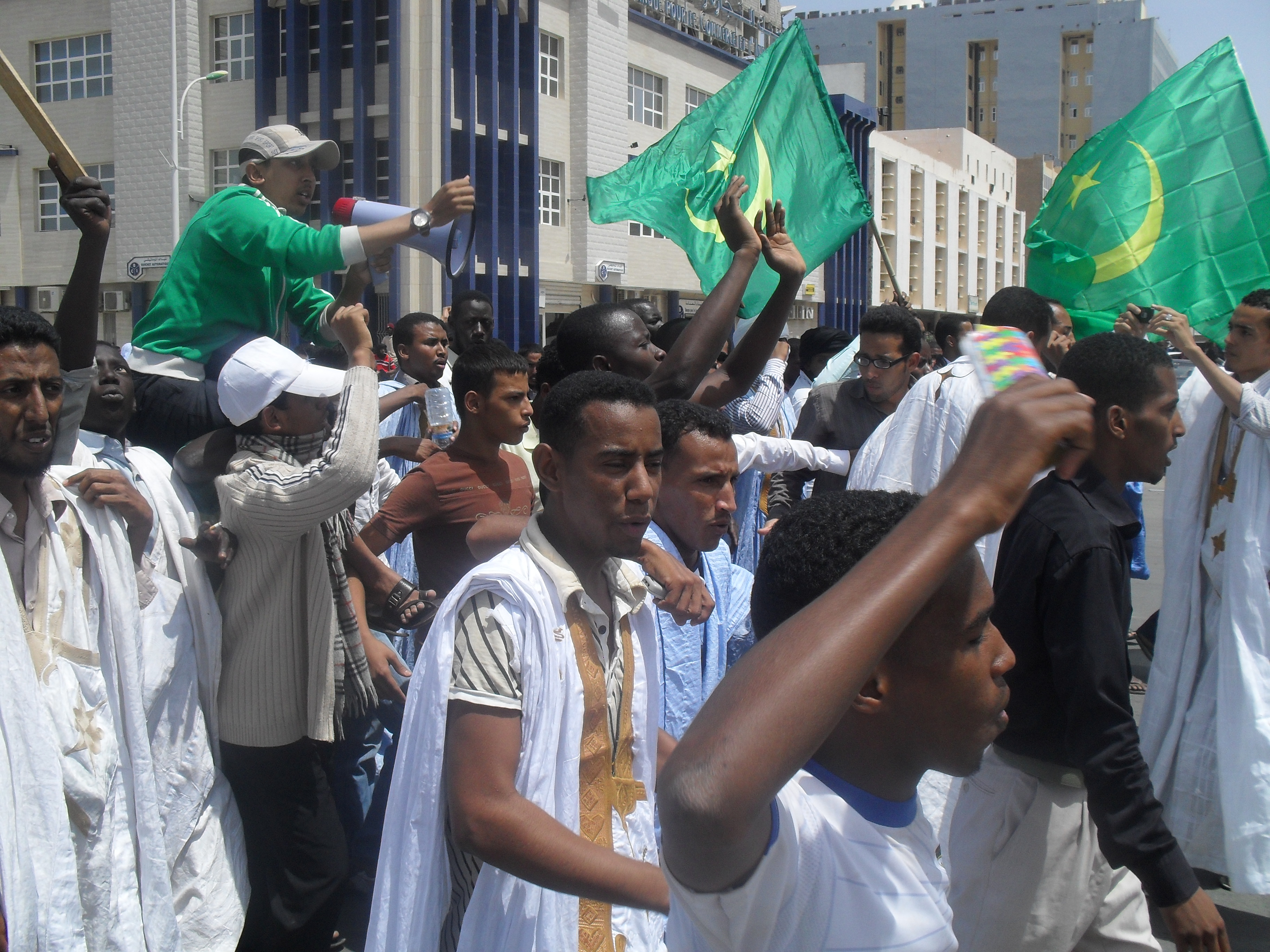
2011–2012 Mauritanian protests.

A Mauritanian lawmaker, Mohammed Al Mukhtar, claimed that many of the country's people supported the takeover of a government that had become "an authoritarian regime" under a president who had "marginalized the majority in parliament". However, Abdel Aziz's regime was isolated internationally, and became subject to diplomatic sanctions and the cancellation of some aid projects. Domestically, a group of parties coalesced around Abdallahi to continue protesting the coup, which caused the junta to ban demonstrations and crack down on opposition activists. International and internal pressure eventually forced the release of Abdallahi, who was instead placed under house arrest in his home village. The new government broke off relations with Israel.

After the coup, Abdel Aziz insisted on holding new presidential elections to replace Abdallahi; however, Aziz was forced to reschedule them due to internal and international opposition. During the spring of 2009, the junta negotiated an understanding with some opposition figures and international parties. As a result, Abdallahi formally resigned under protest, as it became clear that some opposition forces had defected from him and most international players, notably including France and Algeria, now aligned with Abdel Aziz. The United States continued to criticize the coup, but did not actively oppose the elections.

Abdallahi's resignation allowed the election of Abdel Aziz as civilian president, on 18 July, by a 52% majority.

Many of Abdallahi's former supporters criticized this as a political ploy and refused to recognize the results. Despite complaints, the elections were almost unanimously accepted by Western, Arab and African countries, which lifted sanctions and resumed relations with Mauritania. By late summer, Abdel Aziz appeared to have secured his position and to have gained widespread international and internal support. Some figures, such as Senate chairman Messaoud Ould Boulkheir, continued to refuse the new order and call for Abdel Aziz's resignation.

In February 2011, the waves of the Arab Spring spread to Mauritania, where thousands of people took to the streets of the capital.

In November 2014, Mauritania was invited as a non-member guest nation to the G20 summit in Brisbane.

The national flag of Mauritania was changed on 5 August 2017. Two red stripes were added as a symbol of the country's sacrifice and defense. In late 2018, Mauritania bribed members of the EU parliament (Antonio Panzeri) to "not speak ill of Mauritania" in what became known as the Qatar corruption scandal at the European Parliament.

=== 2019–present ===
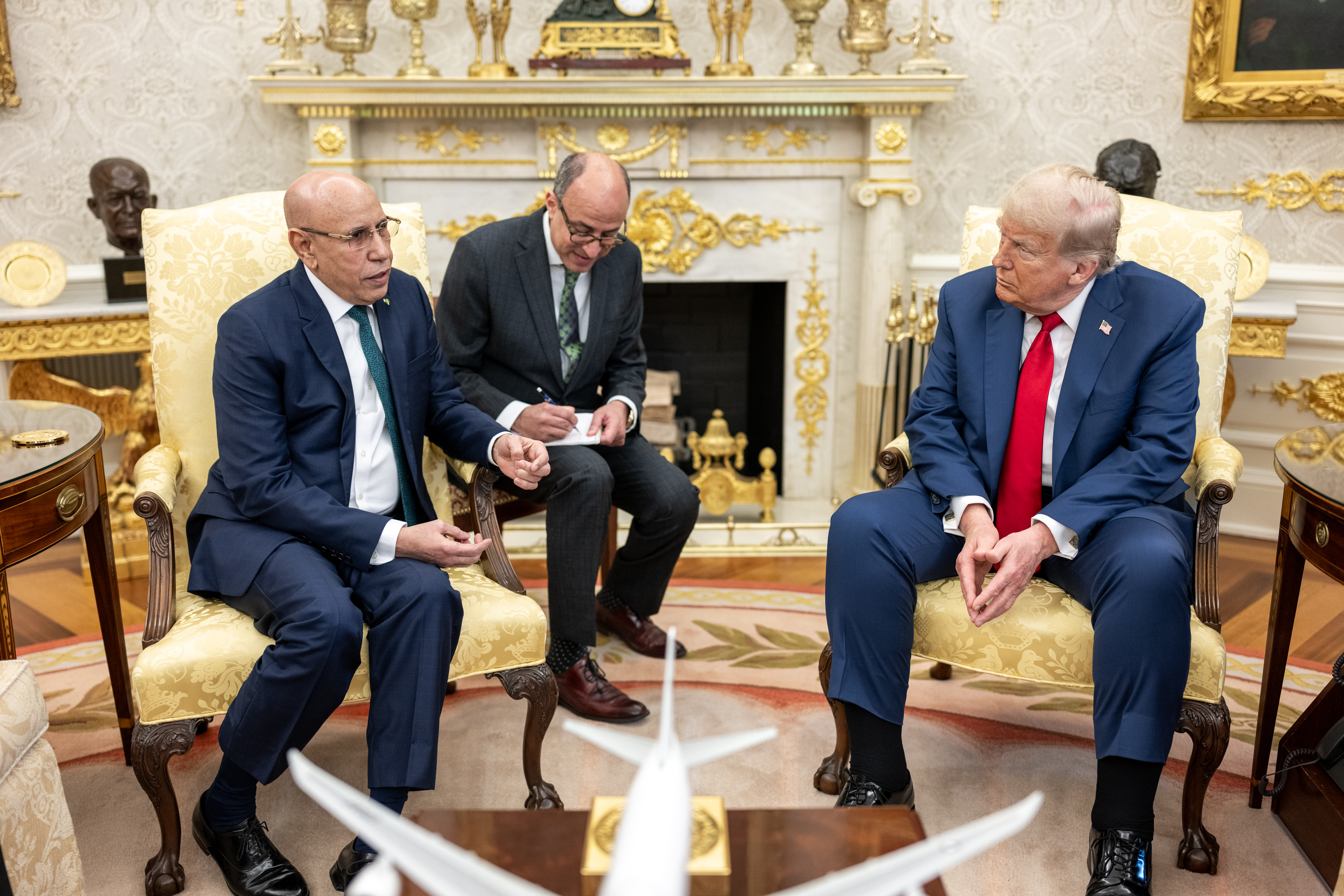
Mauritania's President Mohamed Ould Ghazouani with US President Donald Trump, 9 July 2025

In August 2019, Mohamed Ould Ghazouani was sworn in as president after the 2019 elections, which were considered Mauritania's first peaceful transition of power since independence.

In June 2021, former president Mohamed Ould Abdel Aziz was arrested amidst a corruption probe into allegations of embezzlement. In December 2023, Aziz was sentenced to 5 years in prison for corruption.

In early 2024, a sudden increase of the number of refugees arriving on the Canary Islands by boat prompted a visit from European Commission president Ursula von der Leyen and Spanish prime minister Pedro Sánchez. The EU subsequently signed a €210M deal with Mauritania to reduce passage of African migrants through its territory towards the Canary Islands. The UN estimates that 150,000 people from Mali have fled to Mauritania.

In June 2024, President Ghazouani was re-elected for a second term.

== Geography ==
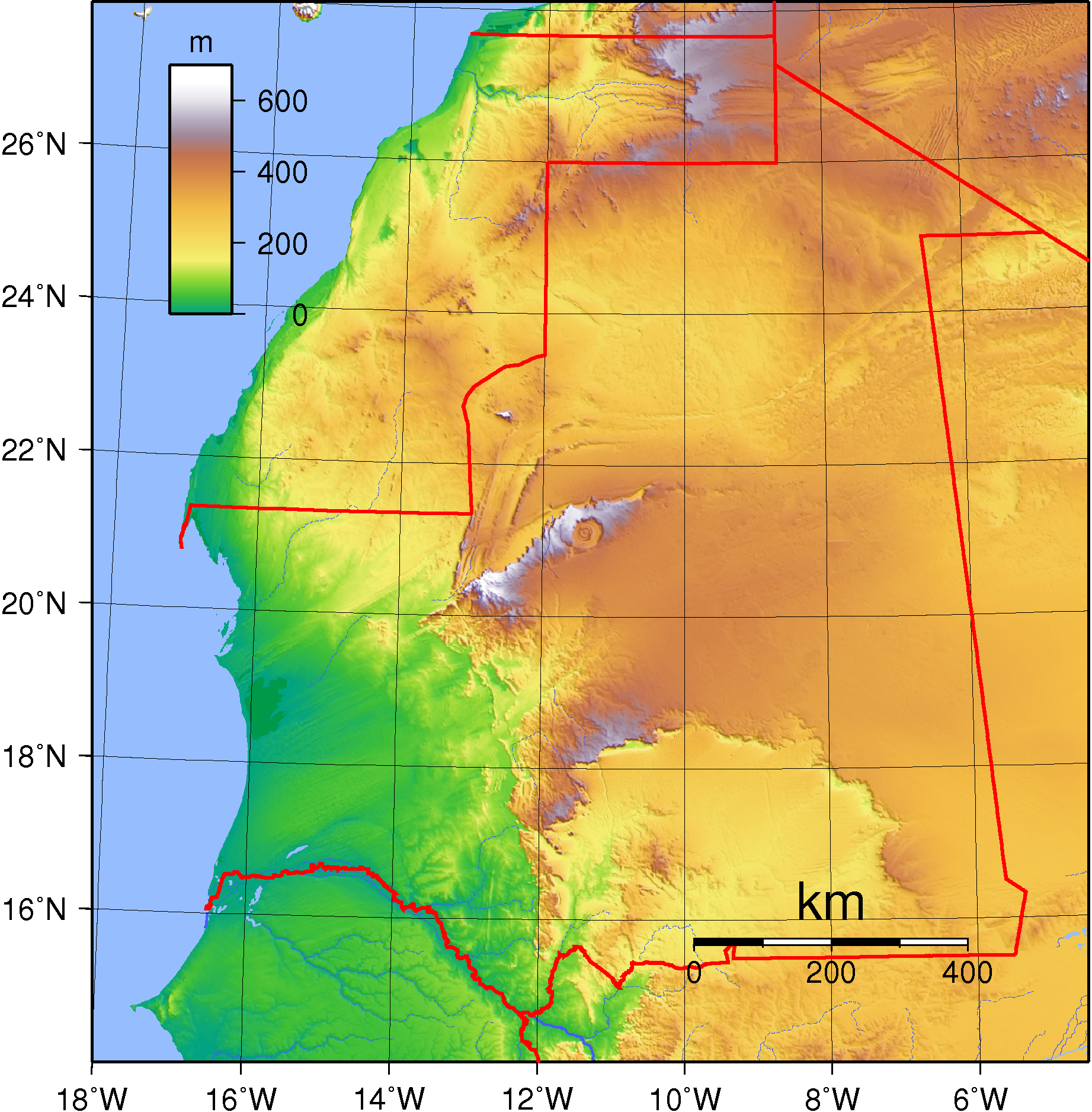
Topography of Mauritania

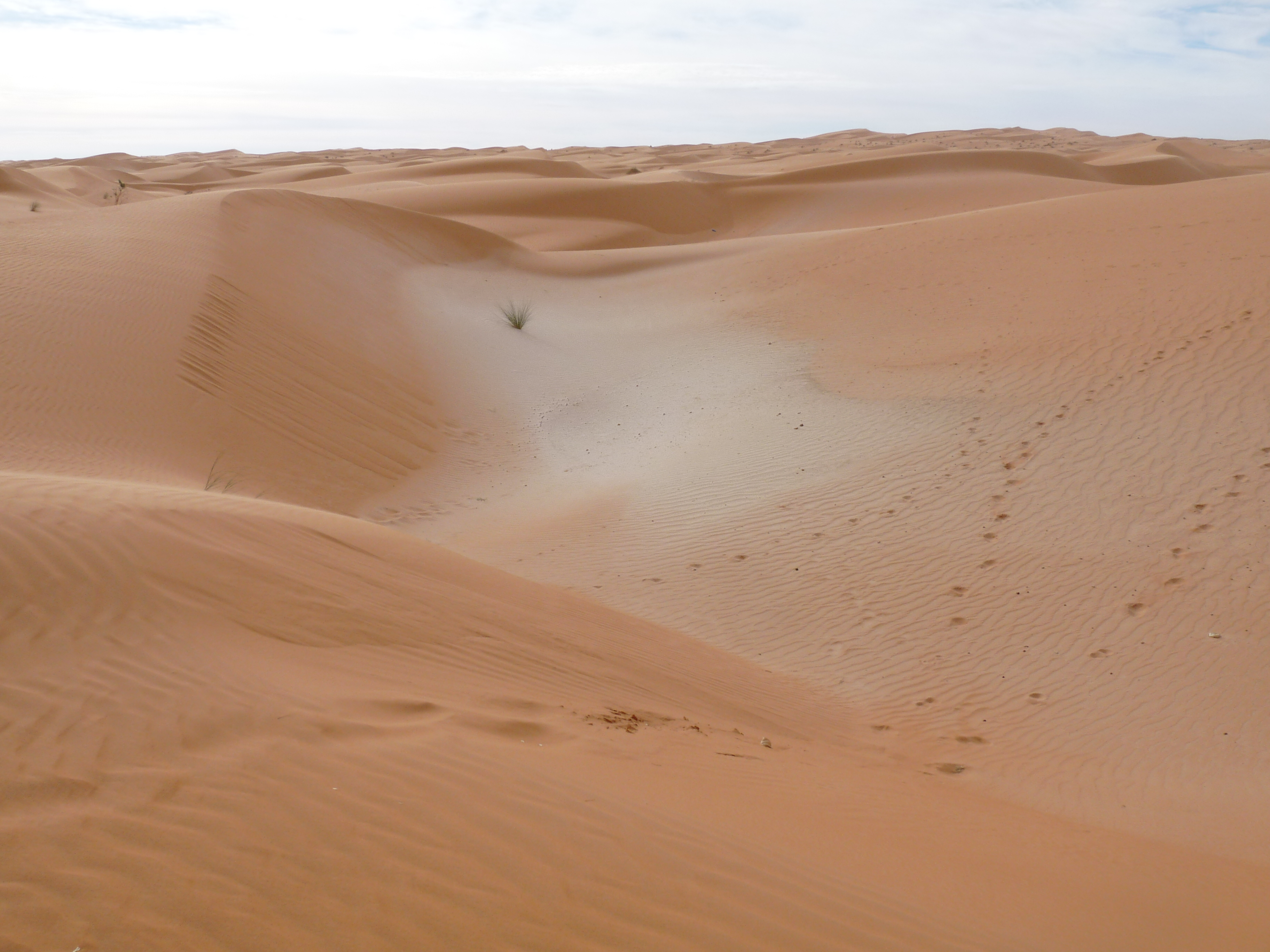
Sandy area west of Chinguetti

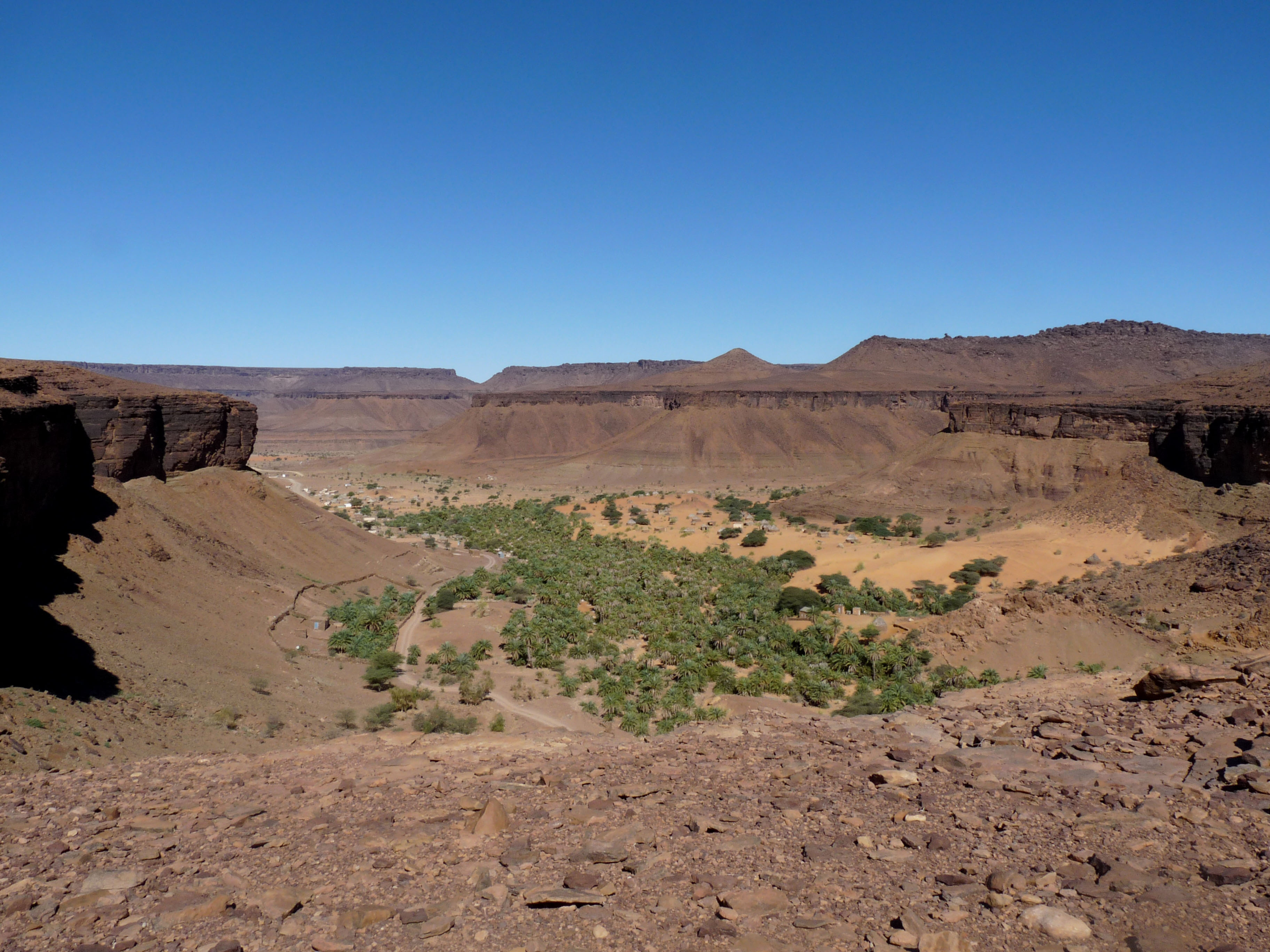
Terjit oasis in the Adrar Region

Mauritania lies in the western region of the continent of Africa, and is generally flat, its 1,030,000 km^{2} (400,000 sq mi) forming vast, arid plains broken by occasional ridges and clifflike outcroppings. It borders the North Atlantic Ocean to the west, Senegal to the southwest, Mali to the east and southeast, Algeria to the northeast, and Western Sahara to the north and northwest. It is considered part of both the Sahel and the Maghreb. Approximately three-quarters of Mauritania is desert or semidesert. As a result of extended, severe drought, the desert has been expanding since the mid-1960s.

A series of scarps face southwest, longitudinally bisecting these plains in the center of the country. The scarps also separate a series of sandstone plateaus, the highest of which is the Adrar Plateau, reaching an elevation of 500 meters (1,640 ft). Spring-fed oases lie at the foot of some of the scarps. Isolated peaks, often rich in minerals, rise above the plateaus; the smaller peaks are called guelbs and the larger ones kedias. The concentric Guelb er Richat is a prominent feature of the north-central region. Kediet ej Jill, near the city of Zouîrât, has an elevation of 915 meters (3,000 ft) and is the highest peak. The plateaus gradually descend toward the northeast to the barren El Djouf, or "Empty Quarter," a vast region of large sand dunes that merges into the Sahara Desert. To the west, between the ocean and the plateaus, are alternating areas of clayey plains (regs) and sand dunes (ergs), some of which shift from place to place, gradually moved by high winds. The dunes generally increase in size and mobility toward the north.

Belts of natural vegetation, corresponding to the rainfall pattern, extend from east to west and range from traces of tropical forest along the Senegal River to brush and savanna in the southeast. Only sandy desert is found in the center and north of the country. Mauritania is home to seven terrestrial ecoregions: Sahelian Acacia savanna, West Sudanian savanna, Saharan halophytics, Atlantic coastal desert, North Saharan steppe and woodlands, South Saharan steppe and woodlands, and West Saharan montane xeric woodlands.

The Richat Structure, dubbed the "Eye of the Sahara", is a formation of rock resembling concentric circles in the Adrar Plateau, near Ouadane, west–central Mauritania.

=== Wildlife ===
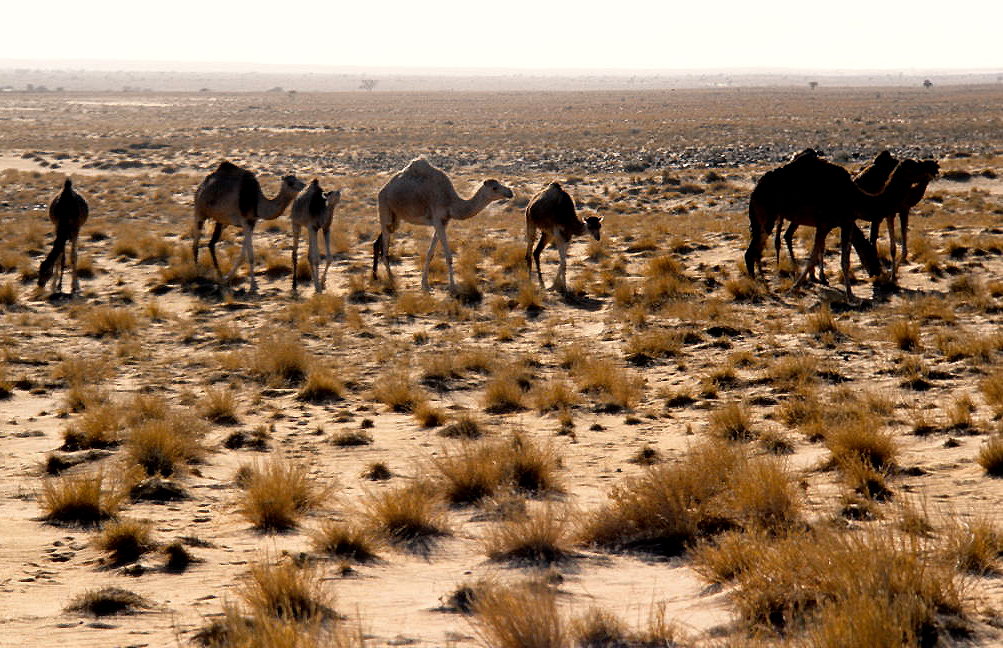
Semi-desert in Mauritania

Mauritania's wildlife has two main influences as the country lies in two biogeographic realms; the north sits in the Palearctic which extends south from the Sahara to roughly 19° north, and the south in the Afrotropic realms. Additionally Mauritania is important for numerous birds which migrate from the Palearctic to winter there.

Most of the north to about 19° north is regarded as being in the Palearctic, and is largely made up of the Sahara Desert and adjacent littoral habitats. South of this is regarded as being in the Afrotropical biogeographic realm, which means that species of a predominantly Afrotropical distribution dominate the fauna. South of the Sahara is the South Saharan steppe and woodlands ecoregion which integrates into the Sahelian acacia savanna ecoregion. The southernmost part of the country lies in the West Sudanian savanna ecoregion.

Mauritania includes wetlands, including two main protected areas: the Banc d'Arguin National Park, which protects shallow coastal and marine ecosystems integrating with the arid Sahara Desert, and the Diawling National Park, which forms the northern part of the delta of the Senegal River. Elsewhere in Mauritania, wetlands are normally ephemeral and rely on the seasonal rainfall.

== Government and politics ==
The Mauritanian Parliament is composed of a single chamber, the National Assembly. Composed of 176 members, representatives are elected for a five-year term in single-seat constituencies.

Until August 2017, the parliament had an upper house, the Senate. The Senate had 56 members, 53 members elected for a six-year term by municipal councilors with a third renewed every two years and three elected by Mauritanians abroad. It was abolished in 2017 after a referendum. President Mohamed Ould Abdel Aziz called for the referendum in August 2017 after the Senate rejected his proposals to change the constitution.

Mauritanian President Mohamed Ould Ghazouani and Russian President Vladimir Putin at the Third Russia–Africa Summit in Moscow, 28 October 2026

Mauritania is a semi-presidential republic, where the President of Mauritania is directly elected by absolute majority popular vote in two rounds if needed for a five-year term (eligible for a second term). The last presidential election was held on 29 June 2024, with President Mohamed Ould Ghazouani winning re-election. The Prime Minister is appointed by the President.

=== Military ===
The Armed Forces of Mauritania are the defense force of the Islamic Republic of Mauritania, having an army, navy, air force, gendarmerie, and presidential guard. Other services include the National Guard and national police, though they both are subordinated to the Ministry of the Interior. As of 2018, the Mauritanian armed forces budget constituted 3.9% of the country's GDP.

Ba Ousmane is the current Defense Minister, and General Mohamed Val Ould Rayess Rayess is the current Chief of National Army Staff. Despite the small size it has participated in numerous conflicts in the past including Western Sahara War and Mauritania–Senegal Border War and is currently involved in Operation Enduring Freedom – Trans Sahara.

Mauritania was ranked 95th of 163 most peaceful country in the world, according to the 2024 Global Peace Index.

=== Administrative divisions ===
The government bureaucracy is composed of traditional ministries, special agencies, and parastatal companies. The Ministry of Interior spearheads a system of regional governors and prefects modeled on the French system of local administration. Under this system, Mauritania is divided into 15 regions (wilaya or régions).

Control is tightly concentrated in the executive branch of the central government, but a series of national and municipal elections since 1992 have produced limited decentralization. These regions are subdivided into 44 departments (moughataa).

The regions and capital district and their capitals are:

A clickable map of Mauritania exhibiting its twelve regions and one capital district.

Region	Capital	#
Adrar	Atar	1
Assaba	Kiffa	2
Brakna	Aleg	3
Dakhlet Nouadhibou	Nouadhibou	4
Gorgol	Kaédi	5
Guidimaka	Sélibaby	6
Hodh Ech Chargui	Néma	7
Hodh El Gharbi	Ayoun el Atrous	8
Inchiri	Akjoujt	9
Nouakchott-Nord	Dar-Naim	10
Nouakchott-Ouest	Tevragh-Zeina	10
Nouakchott-Sud	Arafat	10
Tagant	Tidjikdja	11
Tiris Zemmour	Zouérat	12
Trarza	Rosso	13

== Economy ==
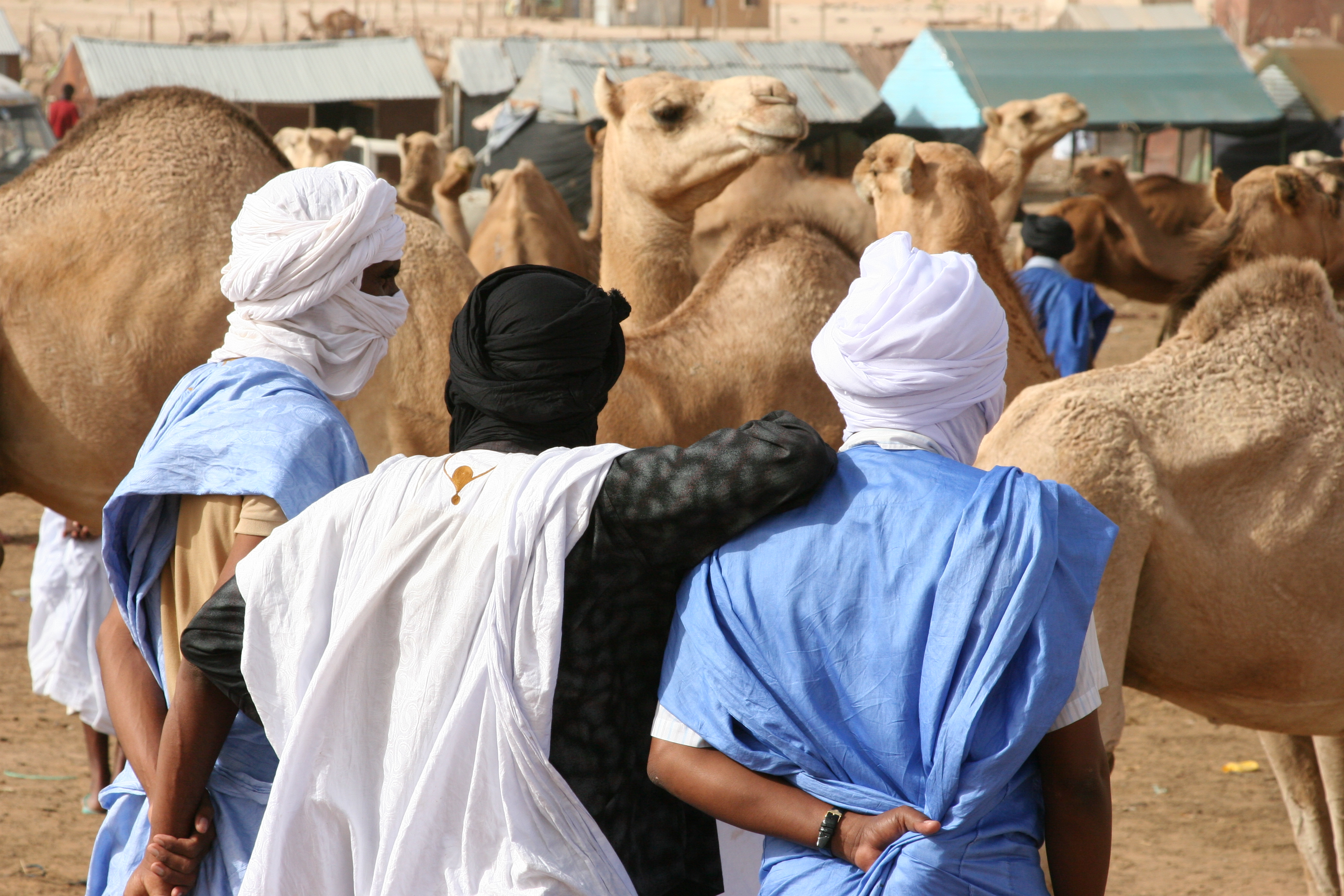
Camel market in Nouakchott

Despite being rich in natural resources, Mauritania has a low GDP. A majority of the population still depends on agriculture and livestock for a livelihood, even though most of the nomads and many subsistence farmers were forced into the cities by recurrent droughts in the 1970s and 1980s. Mauritania has extensive deposits of iron ore, which account for almost 50% of total exports. Gold and copper mining companies are opening mines in the interior such as Firawa mine. The country's gold production in 2015 was 9 metric tons.

The country's first deepwater port opened near Nouakchott in 1986.

In recent years, drought and economic mismanagement have resulted in a buildup of foreign debt. In March 1999, the government signed an agreement with a joint World Bank-International Monetary Fund mission on a $54 million enhanced structural adjustment facility (ESAF). Privatization remains one of the key issues. Mauritania is unlikely to meet ESAF's annual GDP growth objectives of 4–5%.

Oil was discovered in Mauritania in 2001 in the offshore Chinguetti Field. Although potentially significant for the Mauritanian economy, its overall influence is difficult to predict. Mauritania has been described as a "desperately poor desert nation, which straddles the Arab and African worlds and is Africa's newest, if small-scale, oil producer". There may be additional oil reserves inland in the Taoudeni Basin, although the harsh environment will make extraction expensive.

== Demographics ==
Population
Year	Million
1950	0.7
2000	2.7
2021	4.6

As of 2021, Mauritania had a population of about 4.6 million, with roughly a third concentrated in the capital and largest city, Nouakchott, on the Atlantic coast. The local population is composed of three main ethnicities: Bidhan or white Moors, Haratin or black Moors, and Sub-Saharans. The population is 40% Haratin, 30% Bidhan, and 30% others (mostly Black Sub-Saharans). Local statistics bureau estimations indicate that the Bidhan represent around 30% of citizens. The majority of the country speaks Hassaniya Arabic. The Bidhan are of mixed Arab-Berber descent while the Haratin are a distinct ethnic group believed to be descended from ancient Saharans. They are descendants of the original inhabitants of the Tassili n'Ajjer and Acacus Mountain sites from the Epipalaeolithic era. The remaining 30% of the population largely consists of various ethnic groups of West African descent, such as the Niger-Congo-speaking Halpulaar (Fulbe), Soninke, Bambara and Wolof.

=== Largest cities ===
Largest cities or towns in Mauritania National Agency for Statistics, Demographic and Economic Analysis (2023 census)
Rank	Name	Region	Pop.	Rank	Name	Region	Pop.
1	Nouakchott	Nouakchott	1,446,761	11	Adel Bagrou	Hodh Ech Chargui	37,048
2	Nouadhibou	Dakhlet Nouadhibou	173,525	12	Aïoun el Atrous	Hodh El Gharbi	36,517
3	Kiffa	Assaba	84,101	13	Hamed	Assaba	36,448
4	Vassala	Hodh Ech Chargui	79,508	14	Tintane	Hodh El Gharbi	35,995
5	Kaédi	Gorgol	62,790	15	Atar	Adrar	35,171
6	Zouérat	Tiris Zemmour	62,380	16	Néma	Hodh Ech Chargui	35,042
7	Rosso	Trarza	61,156	17	Gouraye	Guidimagha	35,021
8	Boghé	Brakna	50,205	18	Timbédra	Hodh Ech Chargui	34,244
9	Sélibaby	Guidimagha	44,966	19	Voum Legleita	Gorgol	33,314
10	Guerou	Assaba	40,315	20	Boutilimit	Trarza	32,347

=== Religion ===
Mauritania Religions
Islam	99.9%
Christianity	0.1%

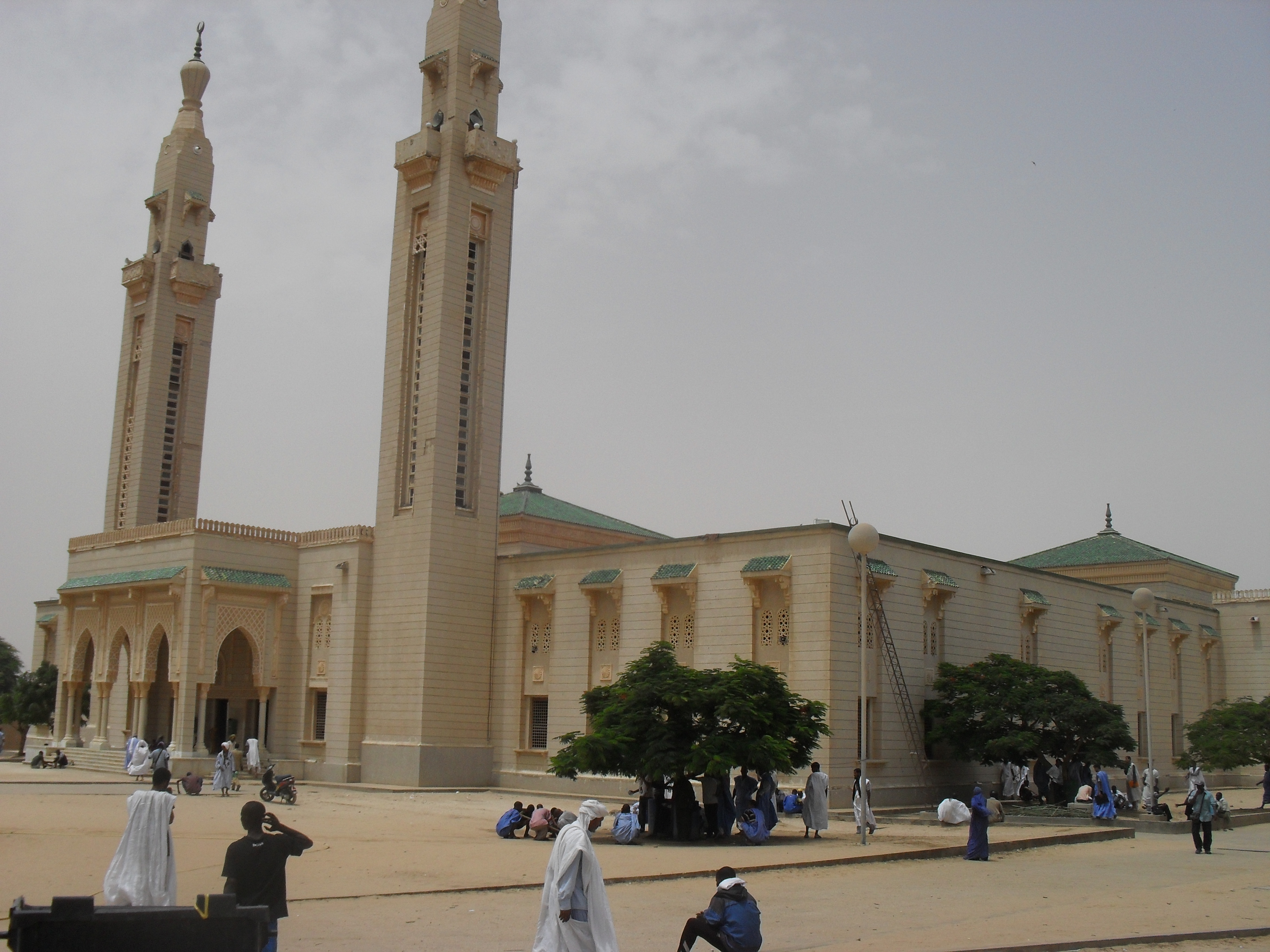
Saudi Mosque in Nouakchott

Mauritania is almost 100% Muslim, with most inhabitants adhering to the Sunni denomination. The Sufi orders, the Tijaniyah and the Qadiriyyah, have great influence not only in the country, but in Morocco, Algeria, Senegal, and other neighboring countries as well. The Roman Catholic Diocese of Nouakchott, founded in 1965, serves the 4,500 Catholics in Mauritania (mostly foreign residents from West Africa and Europe). In 2020, the number of Christians in Mauritania was estimated at 10,000.

There are extreme restrictions on freedom of religion and belief in Mauritania; it is one of the few countries in the world that criminalize and punish atheism with capital punishment. The state religion is Islam, which is reflected in the country's socio-cultural norms.

On 27 April 2018, the National Assembly passed a law that makes the death penalty mandatory for anyone convicted of "blasphemous speech" or acts deemed "sacrilegious". The new law eliminates the possibility, under article 306, of substituting prison terms for the death penalty for certain apostasy-related crimes if the offender promptly repents. The law also provides for a sentence of up to two years in prison and a fine of up to 600,000 Ouguiyas (about €14,600) for "offending public indecency and Islamic values" and for "breaching Allah's prohibitions" or assisting in their breach.

=== Languages ===
Arabic is the official language of Mauritania. The local spoken variety, known as Hassaniya, contains many Berber words and significantly differs from the Modern Standard Arabic that is used for official communication. Arabic, Pulaar, Soninke and Wolof are the four national languages. Despite no longer having official status, French is often used in administration, schools, media, and business.

=== Health ===
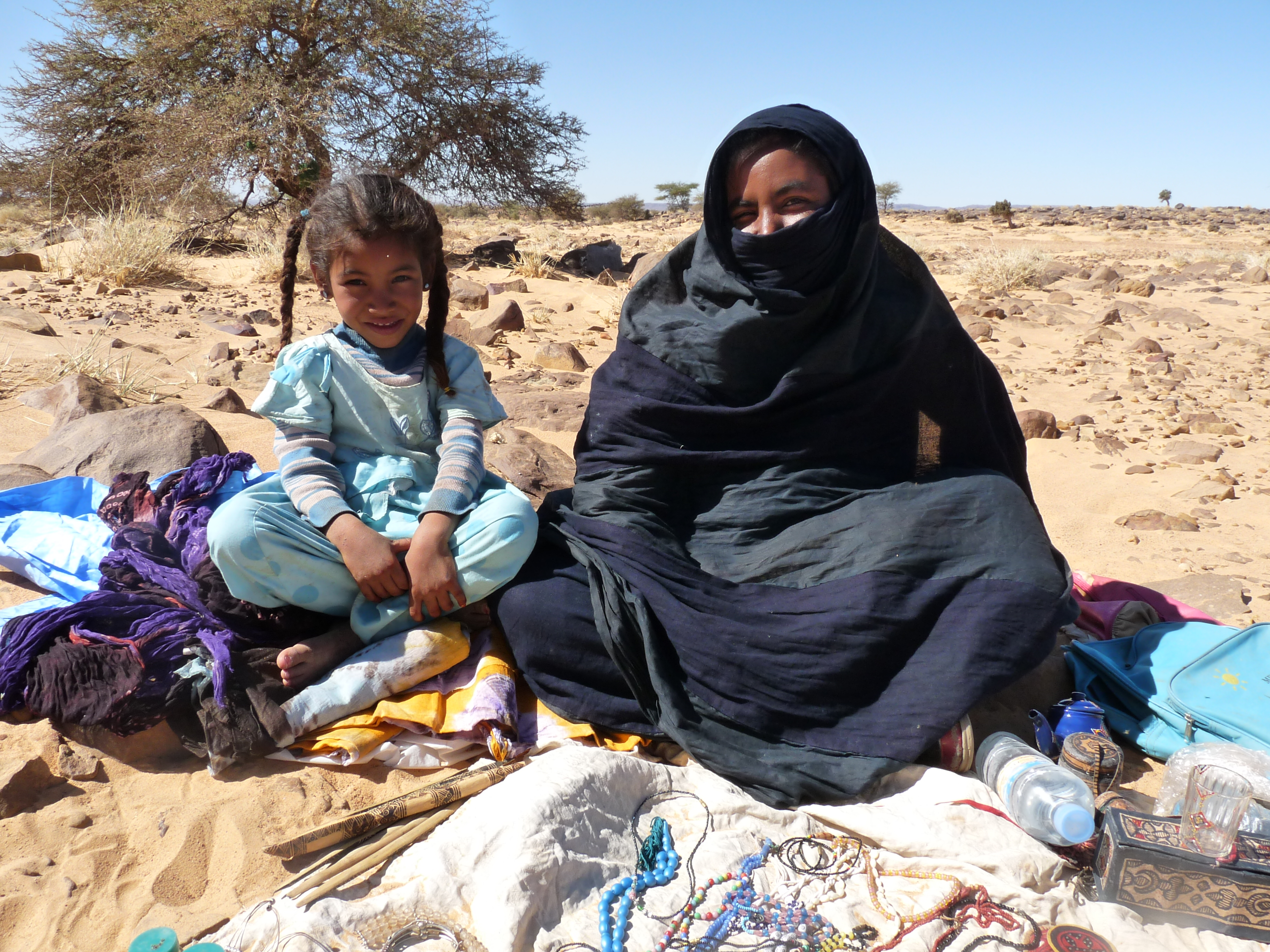
A family in the Adrar Plateau.

As of 2011, life expectancy at birth was 61.14 years. Per capita expenditure on health was US$43 (PPP) in 2004. Public expenditure was 2% of the GDP in 2004 and private 0.9% of the GDP in 2004. In the early 21st century, there were 11 physicians per 100,000 people. Infant mortality is 60.42 deaths/1,000 live births (2011 estimate).

The obesity rate among Mauritanian women is high, in part due to the traditional standards of beauty in some regions, where forced feeding practices such as the leblouh (gavage in French) encourage weight gain, and obese women are considered beautiful while thin women are considered sickly.

=== Education ===
Since 1999, all teaching in the first year of primary school is in Modern Standard Arabic; French is introduced in the second year, and is used to teach all scientific courses. The use of English is increasing.

Mauritania has the University of Nouakchott and other institutions of higher education, but the majority of highly educated Mauritanians have studied outside the country. Public expenditure on education was at 10.1% of 2000–2007 government expenditure. Mauritania was ranked 131st out of 139 in the Global Innovation Index in 2025.

=== Human rights ===
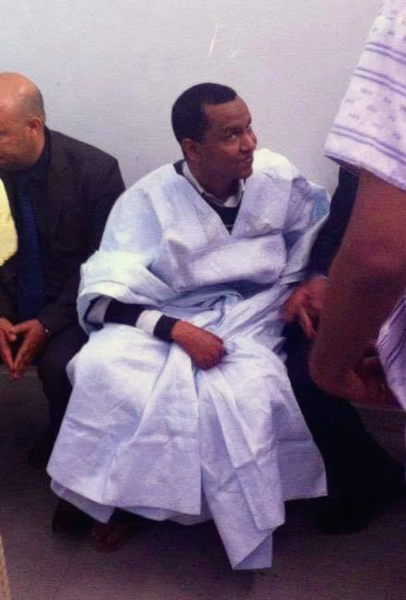
Mauritanian blogger and political prisoner Mohamed Cheikh Ould Mkhaitir.

The Abdallahi government was widely perceived as corrupt, restricting access to information. Sexism, racism, female genital mutilation, child labor, human trafficking, and the political marginalization of largely southern-based ethnic groups continued to be problems.

Homosexuality is illegal and a capital offense in Mauritania.

Following the 2008 coup, the military government of Mauritania faced severe international sanctions and internal unrest. Amnesty International accused it of practicing coordinated torture of criminal and political detainees. Amnesty has accused the Mauritanian legal system, both before and after the 2008 coup, of functioning with complete disregard for legal procedure, fair trial, or humane imprisonment. The organization has said that the Mauritanian government has practiced institutionalized and continuous use of torture throughout its post-independence history, under all its leaders.

Amnesty International in 2008 alleged that torture was common in Mauritania, stating that its usage is "deeply anchored in the culture of the security forces", which use it "as a system of investigation and repression". Forms of torture employed include cigarette burns, electric shocks and sexual violence, stated Amnesty International. In 2014, the United States Department of State identified torture by Mauritanian law enforcement as one of the "central human rights problems" in the country. Juan E. Méndez, an independent expert on human rights from the United Nations, reported in 2016 that legal protections against torture were present but not applied in Mauritania, pointing to an "almost total absence of investigations into allegations of torture".

According to the U.S. State Department 2010 Human Rights Report, abuses in Mauritania include:

mistreatment of detainees and prisoners; security force impunity; lengthy pretrial detention; harsh prison conditions; arbitrary arrest and detentions; limits on freedom of the press and assembly; corruption; discrimination against women; female genital mutilation (FGM); child marriage; political marginalization of southern-based ethnic groups; racial and ethnic discrimination; slavery and slavery-related practices; and child labor.

Initiatives such as the United Nations Development Programme (UNDP) aim to address these human rights violations in line with the Sustainable Development Goals. Through the improvements to the blue economy and green energy transition, the UNDP strives to create employment opportunities, particularly for youth and women, who are underrepresented in the Mauritanian job market.

=== Modern slavery ===
Slavery persists in Mauritania, despite it being outlawed. It is a holdover from a historical caste system, resulting in descent-based slavery. It is estimated that those enslaved are generally darker-skinned Haratin, with their owners often being lighter-skinned Moors. However, slavery also exists among the Sub-Saharan part of the population, with some Sub-Saharan Mauritanians owning slaves of the same skin color as them, and some estimates even stating that slavery is currently more widespread in the south of the country.

In 1905, the French colonial administration declared an end of slavery in Mauritania, to very little effect. Mauritania ratified in 1961 the Forced Labour Convention, having already enshrined abolition of slavery, albeit implicitly, in its 1959 constitution; although nominally abolished in 1981 by presidential decree, a criminal law against the ownership of slaves was enacted only in 2007.

The U.S. State Department 2010 Human Rights Report states, "Government efforts were not sufficient to enforce the antislavery law. No cases have been successfully prosecuted under the antislavery law despite the fact that de facto slavery exists in Mauritania."

In 2012, it was estimated by a CNN documentary that 10% to 20% of the population of Mauritania (between 340,000 and 680,000 people) live in slavery. Modern-day slavery still exists in different forms in Mauritania. According to some estimates, thousands of Mauritanians are still enslaved. A 2012 CNN report, "Slavery's Last Stronghold", documents the ongoing slave-owning cultures. This social discrimination is applied chiefly against the "black Moors" (Haratin) in the northern part of the country, where tribal elites among "white Moors" (Bidh'an, Hassaniya-speaking Arabs and Arabized Berbers) hold sway. Slavery practices exist also within the Sub-Saharan African ethnic groups of the south.

In 2012, a government minister stated that slavery "no longer exists" in Mauritania. However, according to the Walk Free Foundation's Global Slavery Index, there were an estimated 90,000 enslaved people in Mauritania in 2018, or around 2% of the population.

Obstacles to ending slavery in Mauritania include:

- The difficulty of enforcing any laws in the country's vast desert.
- Poverty that limits opportunities for slaves to support themselves if freed.
- Belief that slavery is part of the natural order of society.

== Culture ==
Mauritania's culture reflects a blend of Arab-Berber, African, and Islamic influences shaped by centuries of trans-Saharan exchange. Daily life and social customs vary across ethnic groups. Islam forms a unifying cultural foundation.

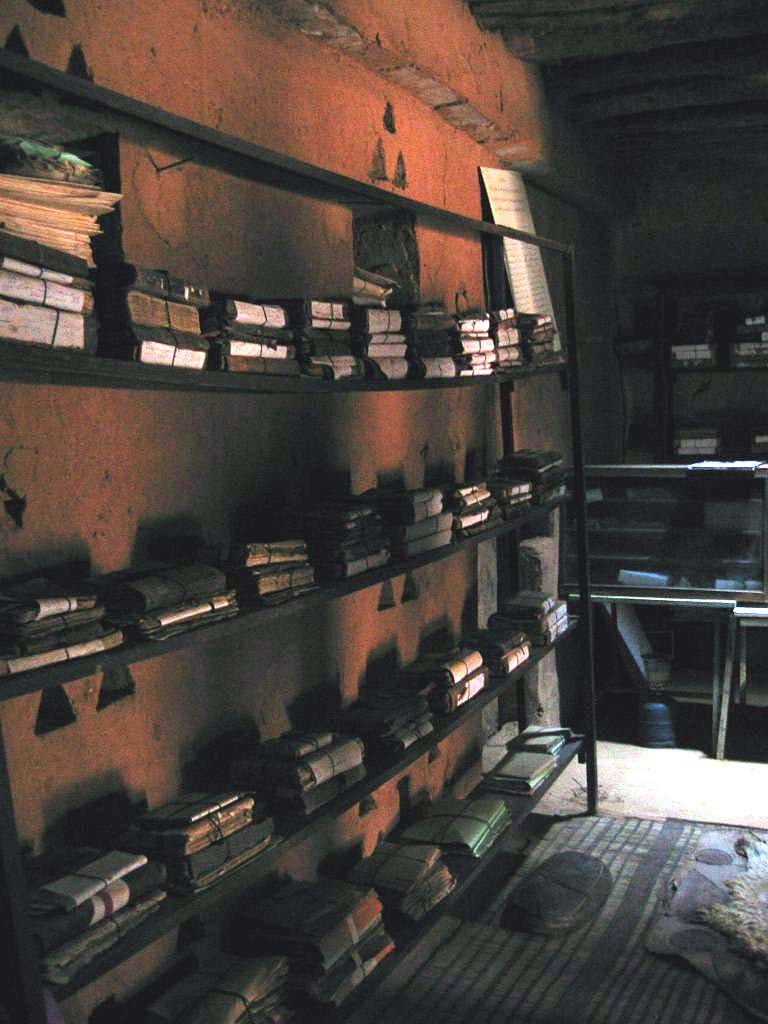
Qur'an collection in a library in Chinguetti

=== Traditional arts and handicrafts ===
Mauritanian craftsmanship is renowned for its metalwork, leatherwork, and textiles. Tuareg and Mauritanian silversmiths maintain long-standing traditions of Berber jewelry design, producing ornate pieces worn by both men and women.

Leatherwork—including bags, saddles, cushions, and tent decorations—remains an important nomadic craft, traditionally produced by women. Loom-woven fabrics, especially the melfa (a long cloth worn by women), are also culturally significant.Tuareg and Mauritanian silversmiths have developed traditions of traditional Berber jewelry and metalwork that have been worn by Mauritanian women and men. According to studies of Tuareg and Mauritanian jewelry, the latter are usually more embellished and may carry typical pyramidal elements.

=== Music ===
Music in Mauritania is structured around modal systems known as al-’igga, performed by hereditary musicians called iggāwen. The tidinit (a lute), ardin (a harp-like instrument played by women), and various percussion instruments form the core of Mauritanian musical ensembles.

Contemporary musicians blend these traditions with modern styles; artists such as Dimi Mint Abba played a major role in introducing Mauritanian music to international audiences.

=== Cinema and media ===
Filming for several documentaries, films, and television shows have taken place in Mauritania, including Fort Saganne (1984), The Fifth Element (1997), Winged Migration (2001), Timbuktu (2014), and The Grand Tour (2024).

The TV show Atlas of Cursed Places (2020) that aired on the Discovery Channel and National Geographic Channel had an episode that mentions Mauritania as a possible location for the lost city of Atlantis. The location they consider is a geological formation consisting of a series of rings known as the Richat Structure, which is located in Western Sahara.

=== Literature ===
Mauritania has one of the richest oral traditions in the Sahara. Poetry in classical Arabic and in Hassaniya Arabic has historically enjoyed high prestige, with poets holding respected social roles. The T'heydinn, a cycle of epic poems preserved within Moorish oral heritage, forms a central component of traditional storytelling and musical performance. Many non-Arab communities also maintain their own oral literatures, including the epic narratives of the Soninké and the praise-song traditions of Halpulaar griots (géwél).

However, there's also a tradition of written literature, especially in the form Islamic manuscripts; for example, Ulrich Rebstock's three-volume study of Arabic literature by Mauritanian authors, Maurische Literaturgeschichte (2001), documents approximately 10,000 works by around 5,000 authors from the sixth to the eighteenth centuries. The libraries of Chinguetti contain thousands of medieval manuscripts.

=== Sports ===
Sports in Mauritania are influenced by its desert terrain and its location on the Atlantic coast. Football is the most popular sport in the country, followed by athletics and basketball. The country has several football stadiums, such as the Stade Municipal de Nouadhibou in Nouadhibou. Despite being ranked as the fourth-worst team in the world in 2012, Mauritania qualified for the 2019 Africa Cup of Nations. In 2023, Mauritania made headlines by defeating Sudan in the AFCON 2023 qualifiers.

Mauritania has been the recipient of international support for sports infrastructure. Morocco has committed to building a sports complex in the country.

=== Cuisine ===
Mauritanian cuisine blends North African, Sahelian, and nomadic culinary traditions. Staple dishes include thieboudienne, méchoui, couscous, and yassa.

Green tea with mint, also known as "atay", is prepared and served in three rounds and symbolizes hospitality.

== See also ==
- Outline of Mauritania
- The Mauritanian—2021 legal drama film
- Telephone numbers in Mauritania
