= Amourj (department) =

Amourj امرج
- Department
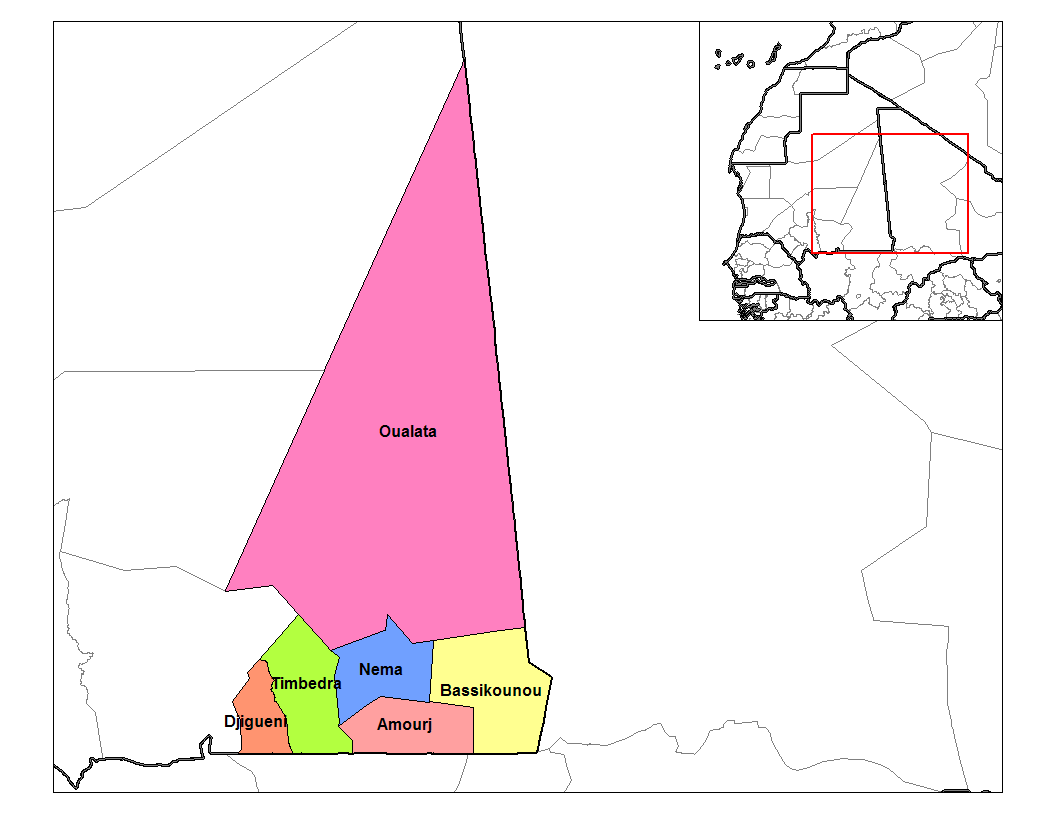

- Location within Mauritania
- Coordinates: 16°06′33″N 7°12′50″W
- Country: Mauritania

Area
  - Total: 3,516 sq mi (9,106 km^{2})

Population (2013)
  - Total: 94,559
  - Density: 26.90/sq mi (10.38/km^{2})

Amourj is a department of Hodh Ech Chargui Region in Mauritania. It shares a border to its south with Mali and to the north, east and west are the departments of Timbedra, Néma and Bassikounou.

== List of municipalities in the department ==
The Amourj department is made up of following communes:

- Adel Bagrou
- Amourj
- Bougadoum
