= Adel Bagrou attack =

2011 attack on a Mauritanian gendarmerie post by Al-Qaeda in the Islamic Maghreb

- Part of the Insurgency in the Maghreb (2002–present)
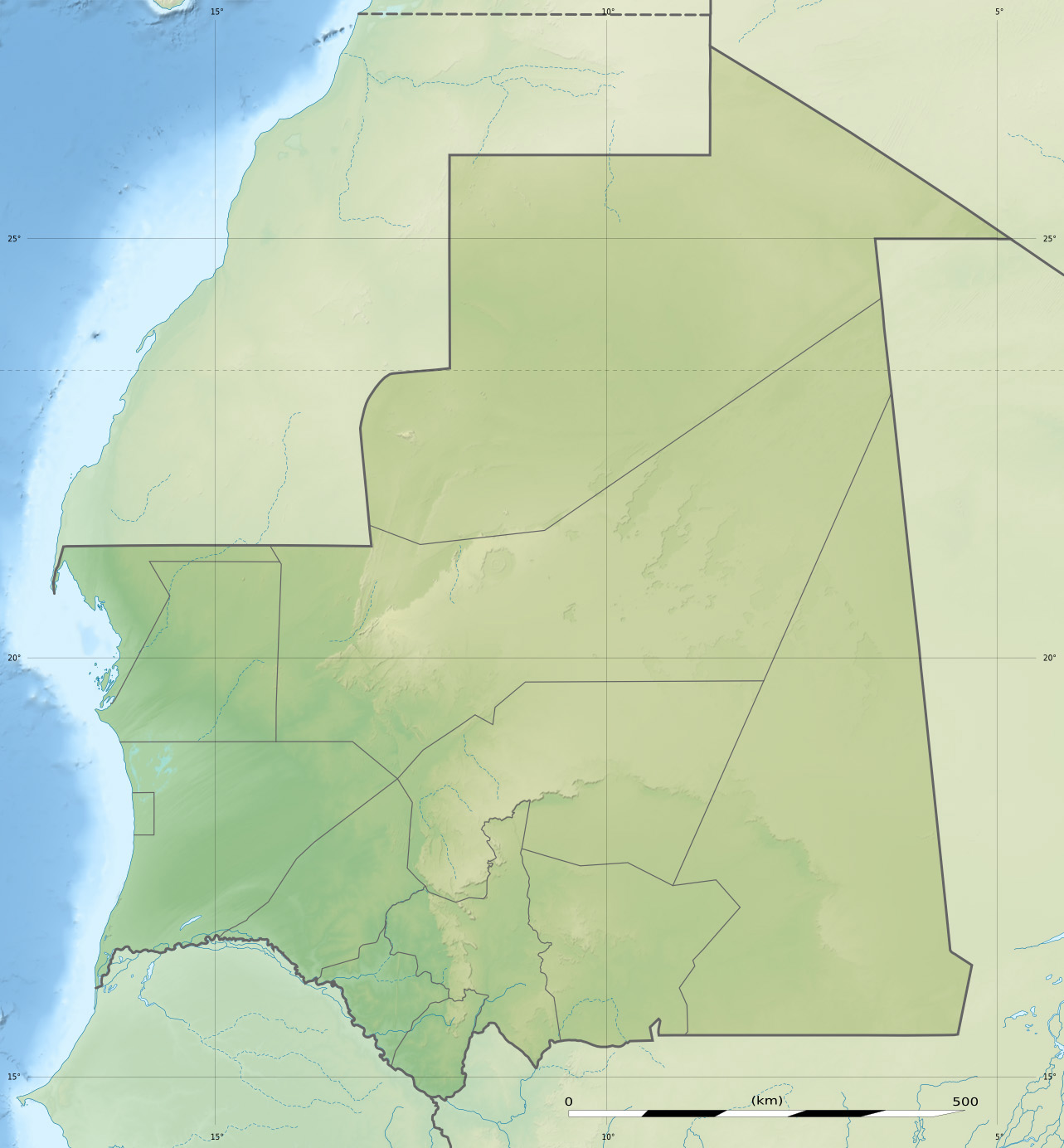
- Attack location (Mauritania)
Date	December 20, 2011; 14 years ago 18:00 (UTC)
Location	Adel Bagrou, Hodh Ech Chargui, Mauritania 15°29′51″N 6°57′2″W
Result	AQIM victory

Belligerents
Mauritania	AQIM

Strength
1 man	5 men

Casualties and losses
1 captured	None

On 20 December 2011, militants affiliated with al-Qaeda in the Islamic Maghreb (AQIM) attacked a Mauritanian gendarmerie post in Adel Bagrou, a town in the Hodh Ech Chargui region near the Malian border.

== Background ==
The attack occurred during a period of heightened militant activity in the Sahel. In the months leading up to the incident, Mauritanian forces had conducted several successful operations against AQIM, including a joint raid with Malian forces in the Wagadou Forest and a major confrontation in Bassikounou in July 2011. These operations significantly weakened AQIM cells operating along the Mauritania–Mali frontier and were widely seen as increasing pressure on the group.

== Attack ==
Around 18:00 local time, five armed men in a pickup truck attacked the Adel Bagrou gendarmerie post, located approximately 4 km from the Malian border. Only one gendarme was present at the post. The attackers opened fire, disabled his vehicle by shooting its tires, and abducted the gendarme, Ely Ould Mokhtar. Mauritanian authorities subsequently ordered a pursuit of the attackers.

== Aftermath ==
On 11 February 2012, AQMI threatened to execute the kidnapped gendarme unless Mauritanian authorities released imprisoned AQMI members within a 20-day ultimatum; he was eventually released through a prisoner exchange on 10 March 2012, in which Mauritania transferred Abderrahmane Ould Meddou, a Malian national serving a five-year sentence for assisting in the 2009 kidnapping of an Italian couple.

This incident is considered the last successful terrorist attack on Mauritanian soil, as the country has managed to prevent similar incidents for more than a decade.
