= Battle of the Wagadou Forest =

The Battle of the Wagadou Forest may refer to:

- Battle of the Wagadou Forest (2011)
- Battle of the Wagadou Forest (2019)
- Battle of the Wagadou Forest (2024)
