= Casbah des Ait Maouine =

Casbah des Ait Maouine قصبة آيت معين
- Location in Mauritania
- Coordinates: 19°39′N 12°19′W
- Country: Mauritania
- Region: Adrar Region
- Department: Chinguetti

Casbah des Ait Maouine (Arabic: قصبة آيت معين) is a town in central-western Mauritania. It is located in the Chinguetti Department in the Adrar Region.

Nearby towns and villages include Tentane (40.4 nm), Chinguetti (48.1 nm), Ksar el Khali (86.5 nm), Ouadane (86.5 nm), Ksar el Barka (75.2 nm) and Rachid (62.4 nm).
