= Tidjikja =

Tidjikja تجكجة
- Commune and town
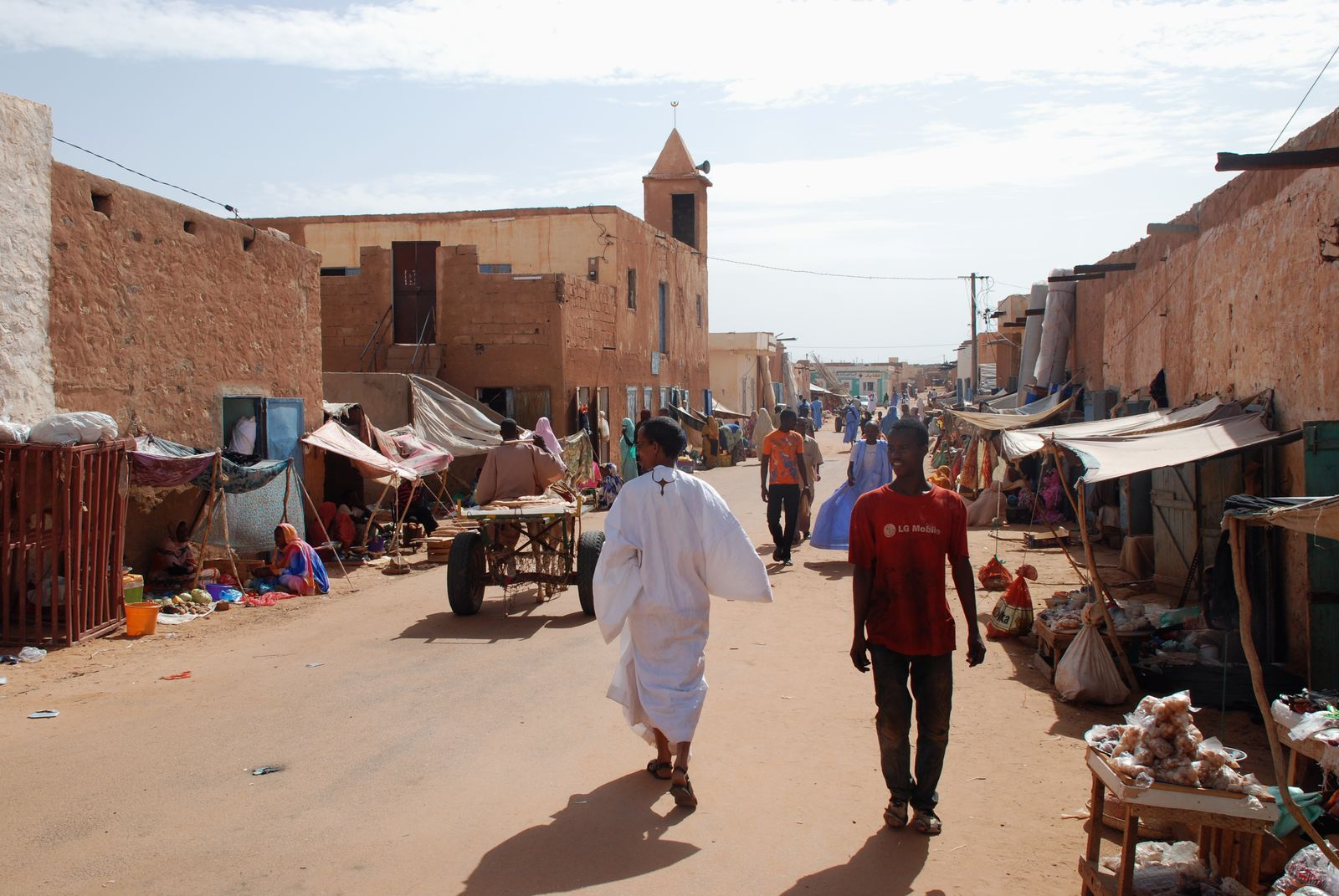
- A market street in the old town

- Location in Mauritania
- Coordinates: 18°33′N 11°26′W
- Country: Mauritania
- Region: Tagant
- Established: 1602
- Elevation: 321 m (1,053 ft)

Population (2015 estimate)
  - Total: 15,532
- Time zone: 0 GMT

Tidjikja (Arabic: تجكجة) is the capital of the Tagant region of central Mauritania, lying on the Tagant plateau. Founded in 1680, it has a population of around 11,000 people.

The town is known for its palm trees and its vernacular architecture. The town is also home to an airport.

It is the birthplace of former President of Mauritania Mohamed Mahmoud Ould Louly.

The city annually welcomes hundreds of tourists from all over Mauritania for the Date Festival. It is marked by its stands, concerts and recreational evenings. Several tents are set up in the large Bathaa of Tidjidkja, each of which is reserved for a theme linked to oasis life (agricultural popularization, traditional medicine of Ehel Maghary, exhibition of dates ...). The city is famous for its dates. An NGO called 'Association for the Safeguarding of the Ghadima' (ASG) was approved by the Ministry of the Interior by decree n° 230 MID of August 30, 2017, and is working on the restoration of the heritage and the conservation of the old Ksar.

Nearby towns and villages include Moudjeria (65.8 nm), Ksar el Barka (46.4 nm), Rachid (21.3 nm), Ksar el Khali (143.4 nm), Ouadane (143.4 nm), Boumdeid (67.1 nm) and Serotandi (46.0 nm).

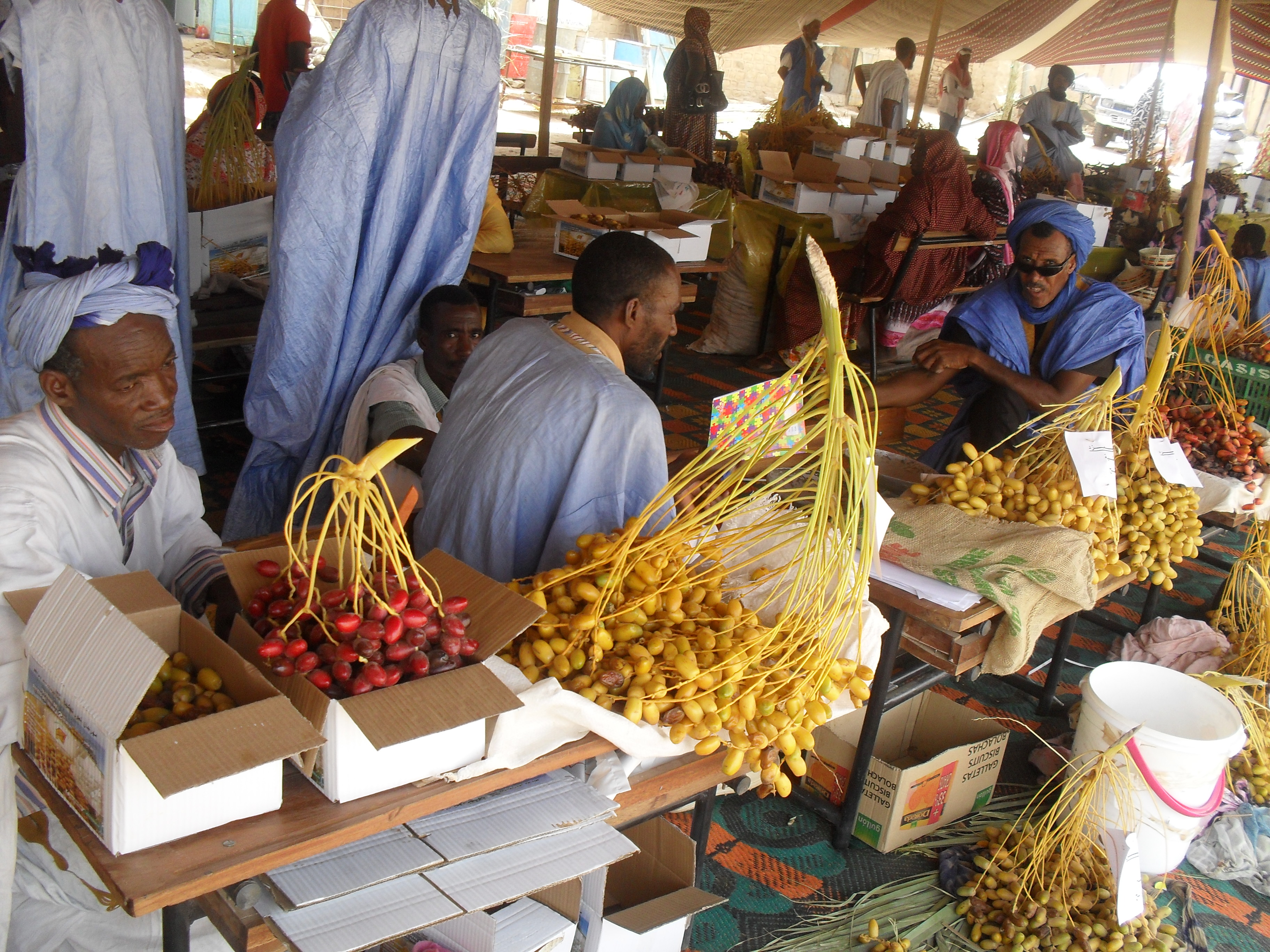
The market during the date festival

== Climate ==
Tidjikja has a hot desert climate (BWh) according to the Köppen climate classification.

Climate data for Tidjikja
Month	Jan	Feb	Mar	Apr	May	Jun	Jul	Aug	Sep	Oct	Nov	Dec	Year
Mean daily maximum °C (°F)	27.8 (82.0)	30.7 (87.3)	33.9 (93.0)	36.0 (96.8)	39.8 (103.6)	41.1 (106.0)	39.0 (102.2)	37.3 (99.1)	37.8 (100.0)	36.6 (97.9)	32.9 (91.2)	27.7 (81.9)	35.1 (95.2)
Daily mean °C (°F)	19.6 (67.3)	21.8 (71.2)	26.6 (79.9)	29.9 (85.8)	33.3 (91.9)	34.7 (94.5)	33.9 (93.0)	32.5 (90.5)	32.5 (90.5)	31.2 (88.2)	25.7 (78.3)	21.7 (71.1)	28.6 (83.5)
Mean daily minimum °C (°F)	12.2 (54.0)	14.4 (57.9)	16.9 (62.4)	19.4 (66.9)	23.8 (74.8)	26.5 (79.7)	25.9 (78.6)	24.8 (76.6)	24.5 (76.1)	22.0 (71.6)	17.5 (63.5)	12.8 (55.0)	20.1 (68.2)
Average precipitation mm (inches)	2 (0.1)	3 (0.1)	1 (0.0)	0 (0)	4 (0.2)	10 (0.4)	21 (0.8)	56 (2.2)	37 (1.5)	10 (0.4)	4 (0.2)	1 (0.0)	149 (5.9)
Average relative humidity (%)	36	31	29	28	27	29	32	44	42	38	40	37	34
Mean monthly sunshine hours	272.8	262.7	310.0	324.0	313.1	264.0	300.7	297.6	270.0	279.0	264.0	251.1	3,409
Mean daily sunshine hours	8.8	9.3	10.0	10.8	10.1	8.8	9.7	9.6	9.0	9.0	8.8	8.1	9.3
Source: Arab Meteorology Book
