= Rachid, Mauritania =

Rachid الرشيد
- Location in Mauritania
- Coordinates: 18°41′45″N 11°40′47″W
- Country: Mauritania
- Region: Tagant
- Department: Tidjikja

Rachid (Arabic: الرشيد) is a town in central Mauritania at the foot of the Tagant Plateau. It is located in the Tidjikja Department in the Tagant region. It is located 39 kilometres (21 nmi) from the department capital of Tidjikja.

Nearby towns and villages include Barka (72 km or 39 nmi), Casbah des Ait Maouine (115 km or 62 nmi), Ksar el Khali (237 km or 128 nmi), and Ouadane (237 km or 128 nmi).

Rachid was founded by Kunta people coming from the Adrar Plateau in either 1722/3 or 1765, in response to desertification. Two Fula communities had previously occupied the site but had been driven out by raiders.
