= Jraif =

Jraif جريف
- Location in Mauritania
- Coordinates: 20°50′N 12°26′W
- Country: Mauritania
- Region: Adrar Region
- Department: Chinguetti

Jraif (Arabic: جريف, romanized: Jurayf) is a town in central-northwestern Mauritania. It is located in the Chinguetti Department in the Adrar Region.

Nearby towns and villages include Benibafat (19.2 nm), Néma (8.0 nm), Puits des Boradda (31.6 nm), Amerj Arr (23.5 nm) and Kataouane (35.4 nm).
