= Tagant =

Tagant may refer to:

- Tagant Region, a region in south-central Mauritania
- Tagant Plateau, a land area in eastern Mauritania
