= Diade =

- Location in Mauritania
- Coordinates: 16°14′N 7°25′W
- Country: Mauritania
- Region: Hodh Ech Chargui Region
- Department: Néma

Diade is a town in south-eastern Mauritania. It is located in the Néma Department in the Hodh Ech Chargui Region.
