= Battle of Bassikounou =

2011 conflict in Mauritania

- Part of the Insurgency in the Maghreb (2002–present)
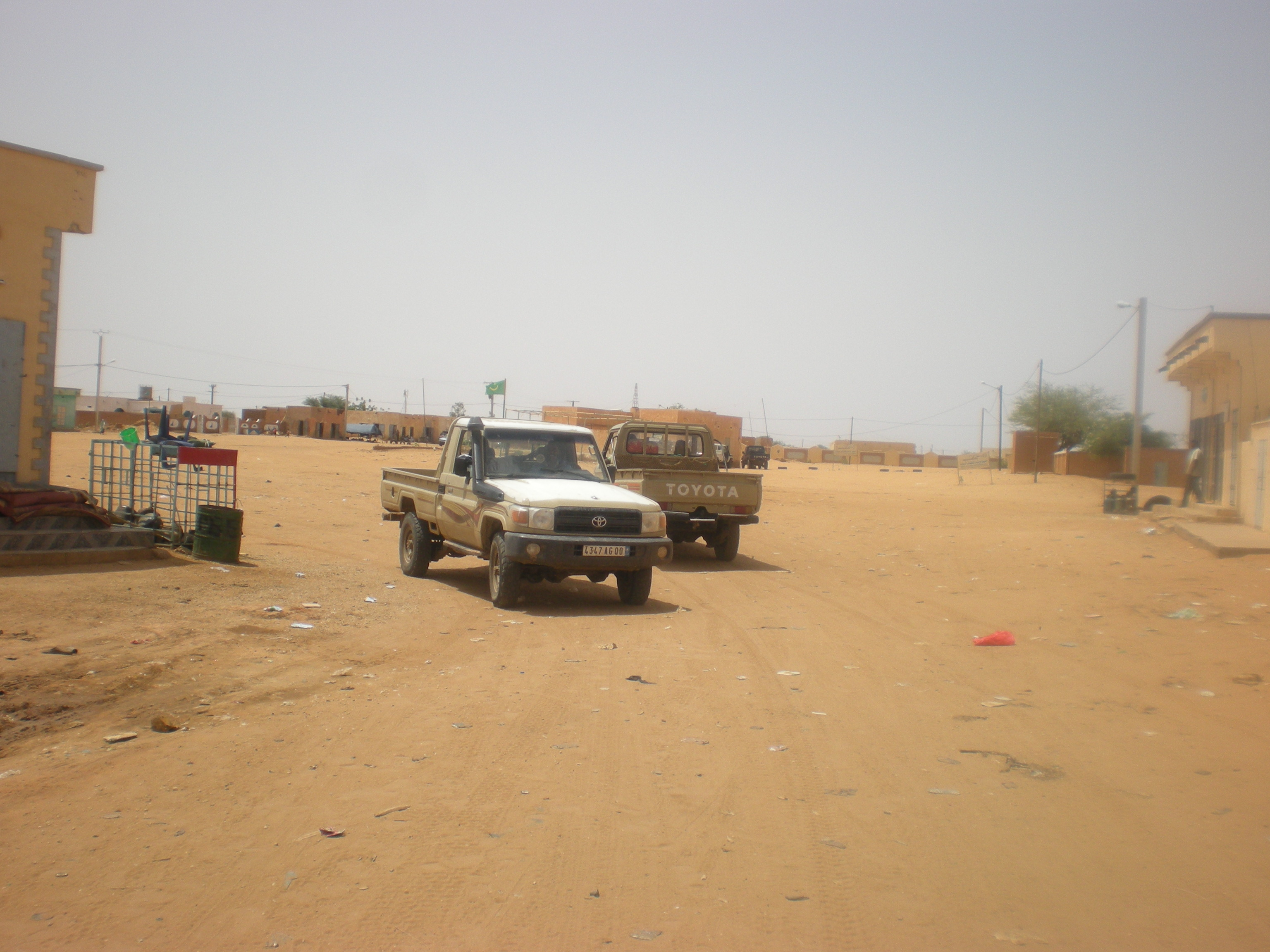
- Mauritanian pickup in Bassikounou, July 2011
Date	July 5, 2011; 15 years ago 16:30 UTC
Location	near Bassikounou, Hodh Ech Chargui, Mauritania 15°51′56″N 5°57′12″W
Result	Mauritanian victory

Belligerents
Mauritania	AQIM

Casualties and losses
3–4 injured	15–20 killed (per military and medical sources); 9 captured 6 killed (per Mauritanian Army); 2 killed (per AQIM)

On July 5, 2011, clashes broke out between Al-Qaeda in the Islamic Maghreb (AQIM) and Mauritanian forces in Bassikounou, Mauritania.

== Background ==
Between 2005 and 2011, Al-Qaeda in the Islamic Maghreb (AQIM) had a stronghold in the Wagadou forest on the border between Mali and Mauritania. On June 24, 2011, Malian and Mauritanian forces launched an offensive on AQIM in the forest to finally dislodge the group, killing several jihadists.

== Battle ==
According to a resident of Bassikounou, occupants of a car on the way to Fassala raised the alarm about an imminent jihadist incursion. The car was stopped by an AQIM checkpoint about ten kilometers outside of the city but were released. Mauritanian soldiers were then dispatched to confront the checkpoint. Clashes broke out between the two groups at 4 p.m. They exchanged artillery and heavy weapons fire for an hour, with the jihadists withdrawing before Mauritanian airpower arrived. Mauritanian forces set out in pursuit of the jihadists, with the air force shooting several jihadists.

Fighting ended around 7 p.m., with a city official stating he saw three vehicles destroyed. In a statement, AQIM stated that the attack was in retaliation for the raid on Wagadou.

== Aftermath ==
The Mauritanian Army announced in a press release that six jihadists were killed. The release clarified that "around 4:30 p.m., an enemy column made up of over 20 vehicles was surrounded by heavy fire from our units. Six fighters were killed during the clash; one left on the battlefield, two burned in their vehicle, and three others near Gataa El Gam. There are strong indications a large number of terrorists were injured. Alhamdulillah, no material or human losses were in our ranks."

A local official in Bassikounou stated fifteen jihadists were killed, nine were taken prisoner, and two vehicles were destroyed. The same source stated that three Mauritanian soldiers were injured. AQIM claimed only two deaths within their ranks, and that none of their men were captured. A military source contacted by AFP stated that twenty jihadists were killed, and four soldiers were injured.

In a 2017 interview, General Mohamed Ould Ghazouani stated that at Bassikounou, the Algerian emir of AQIM was killed, and the battle also marked the first time that AQIM left their dead on the ground.
