= Bassikounou meteorite =

Meteorite that fell in 2006 in Mauritania

Bassikounou
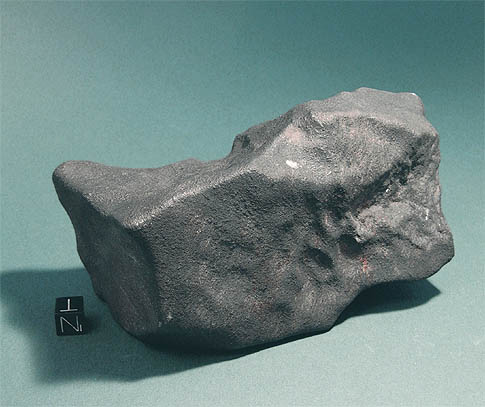
- Bassikounou fragment
- Type: Chondrite
- Class: Carbonaceous chondrite
- Country: Mauritania
- Region: Hodh Ech Chargui Region
- Coordinates: 15°47′N 05°54′W
- Observed fall: Yes
- Fall date: 04:00 local time (07:05 GMT) on 2006 October 16
- Strewn field: Yes

Bassikounou meteorite is a chondrite meteorite whose fall was observed on October 16, 2006, near the town of Bassikounou, in the Hodh Ech Chargui Region, south-east of Mauritania, near the border with Mali.
