= Ouadane Department =

Coordinates: 18°41′34″N 7°3′26″W

Ouadane
- Department
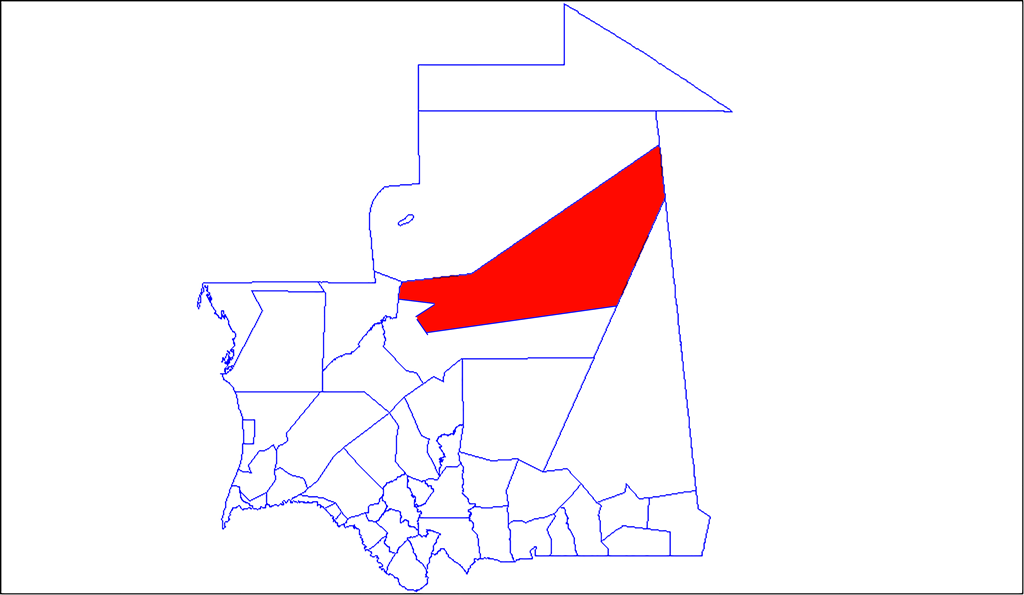
- Country: Mauritania
- Region: Adrar Region

Area
  - Total: 120,778 km^{2} (46,633 sq mi)

Population (2013 census)
  - Total: 3,974
  - Density: 0.03290/km^{2} (0.08522/sq mi)
- Time zone: UTC+0 (+0)

Ouadane is a department of the Adrar Region in Mauritania. This mostly desert-area department is made up of the single Ouadane town.
