= El Medah =

El Medah المداح
- Commune and village
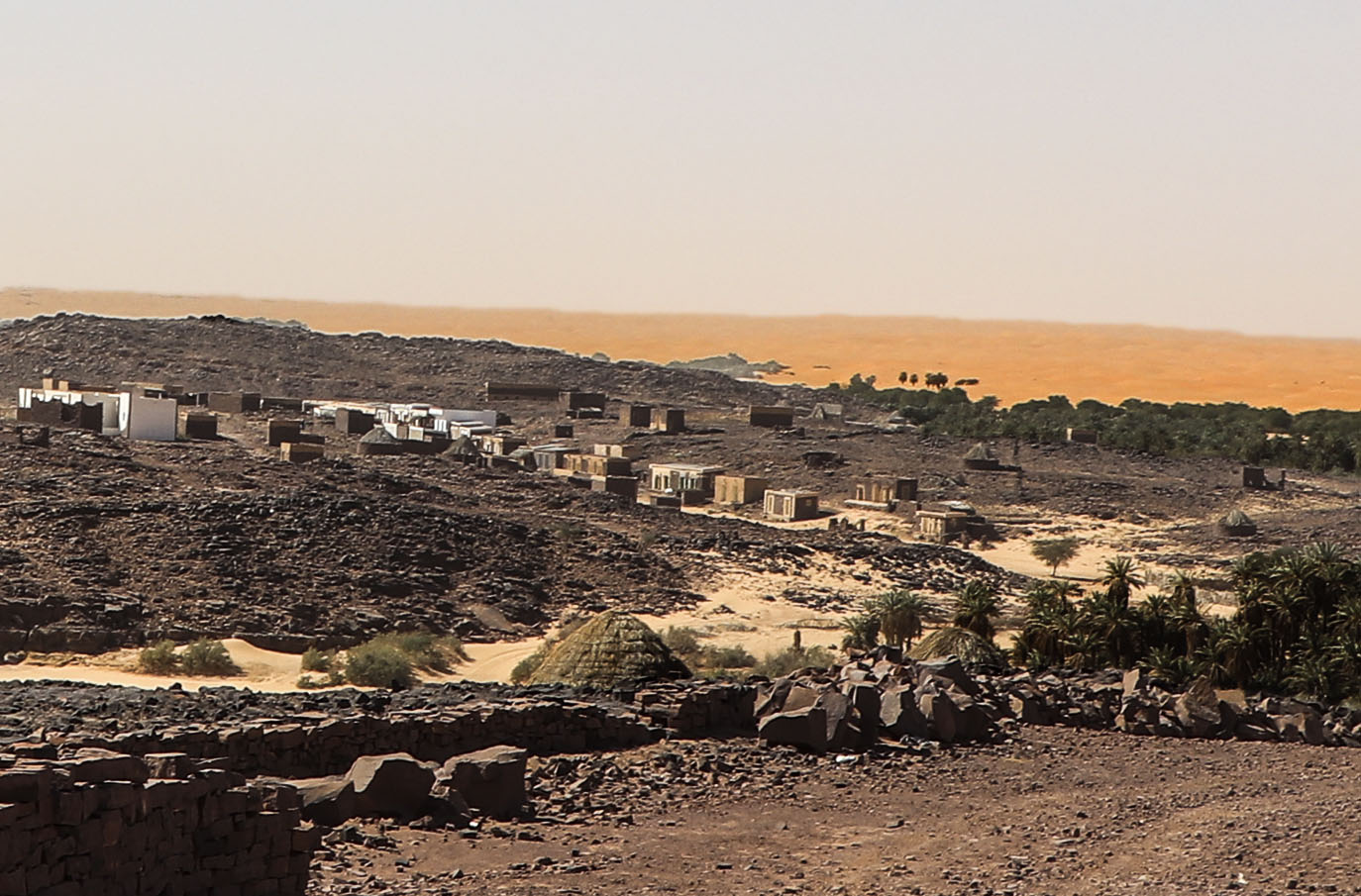
- El Medah and its palm grove

- Location in Mauritania
- Coordinates: 19°54′9″N 13°19′6″W
- Country: Mauritania
- Region: Adrar Region

Population (2013)
  - Total: 3,900
- Time zone: UTC±00:00 (GMT)

El Medah is a village and rural commune in central-western Mauritania, located in the Adrar Region. It is part of the Aoujeft Department. The village has a date palm grove.

The population in the 2013 census was 3,900.
