= Kataouane =

- Location in Mauritania
- Coordinates: 16°4′8″N 6°29′56″W
- Country: Mauritania
- Region: Adrar Region
- Department: Bassikounou

Kataouane is a town in southeastern Mauritania. It is located in the Bassikounou Department in the Hodh Ech Chargui region.
