= Néma =

Néma النعمه
- Commune and town
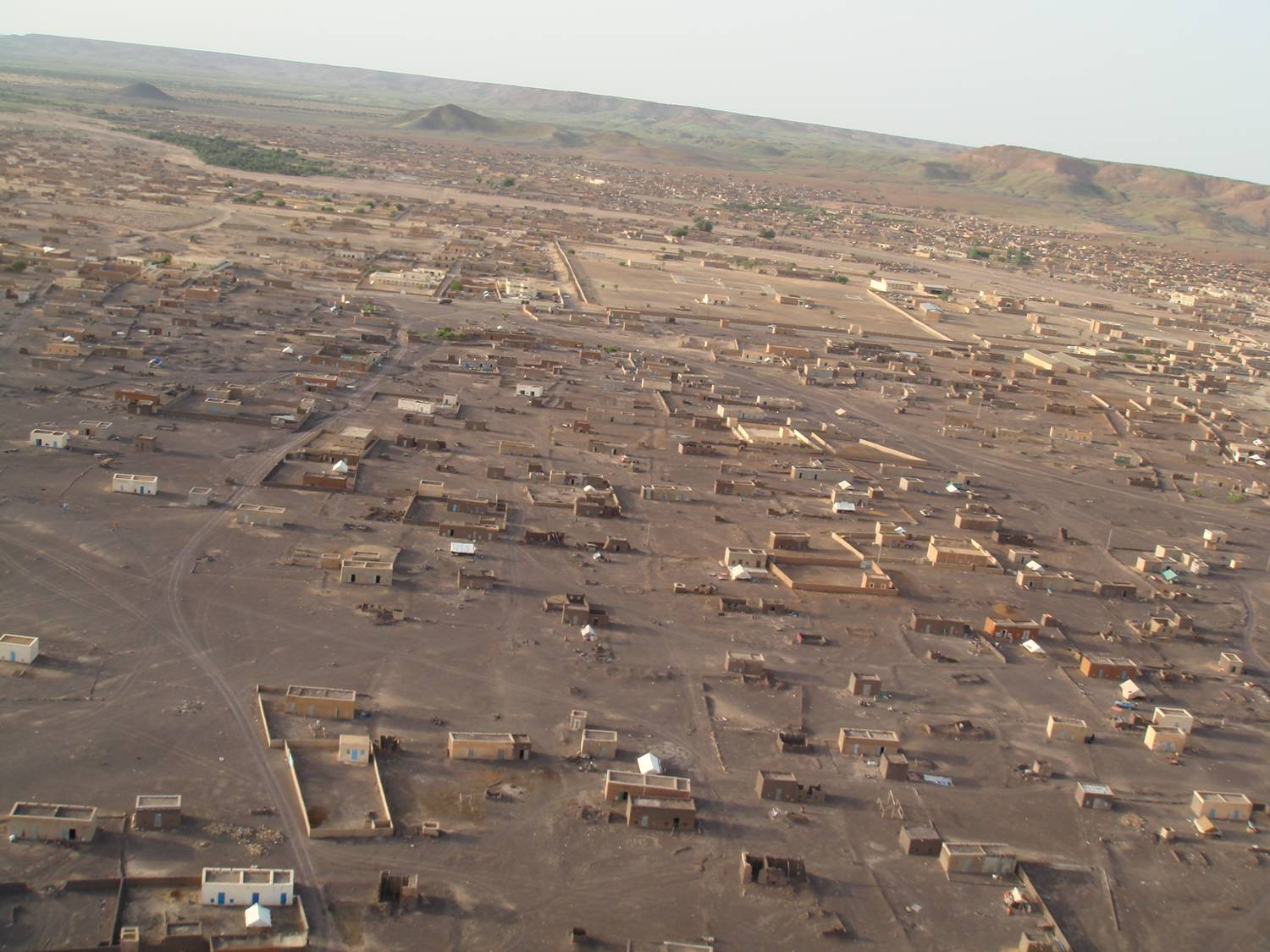

- Location in Mauritania
- Coordinates: 16°37′N 7°15′W
- Country: Mauritania
- Region: Hodh Ech Chargui Region
- Elevation: 280 m (920 ft)

Population (Census 2013)
  - Commune and town: 21,979
  - Metro: 87,048

Néma (Arabic: النعمه) is a town in southeastern Mauritania, close to the border with Mali. It is located at around 16°37′0″N 7°15′0″W at the eastern end of the Aoukar. It is the capital of Hodh Ech Chargui Region and of the Néma Department.

While the urban population of Nema is approximately 20,000, the surrounding rural sites served by the city make it closer to 100,000 in the whole Department.

Mauritanians value brousse, or country living, as a throwback to their nomadic roots. "The Road of Hope", which stretches from the capital, Nouakchott, ends in Nema near the market quartier. There are ten quartiers, sections, of the city, the oldest being Edelibu Quartier, northeast of the road, Shovia Quartier, dating from the 1950s, is the only section south of the road.

== Climate ==
Néma has a hot arid climate (Köppen climate classification BWh). Although there is a clearly defined rainy season from July to September during which 220 millimetres (9 in) of the annual rainfall of 280 millimetres (11 in) falls, even in these months evaporation clearly exceeds rainfall.

Climate data for Nema (altitude 269 metres or 883 feet)
Month	Jan	Feb	Mar	Apr	May	Jun	Jul	Aug	Sep	Oct	Nov	Dec	Year
Mean daily maximum °C (°F)	30.0 (86.0)	33.0 (91.4)	37.0 (98.6)	40.0 (104.0)	42.0 (107.6)	42.0 (107.6)	38.0 (100.4)	35.0 (95.0)	37.0 (98.6)	39.0 (102.2)	36.0 (96.8)	31.0 (87.8)	36.7 (98.1)
Daily mean °C (°F)	23.0 (73.4)	26.2 (79.2)	30.4 (86.7)	33.3 (91.9)	37.0 (98.6)	35.8 (96.4)	33.4 (92.1)	31.8 (89.2)	32.3 (90.1)	33.7 (92.7)	29.2 (84.6)	23.5 (74.3)	30.7 (87.3)
Mean daily minimum °C (°F)	17.0 (62.6)	19.0 (66.2)	23.0 (73.4)	26.0 (78.8)	29.0 (84.2)	28.0 (82.4)	26.0 (78.8)	24.0 (75.2)	25.0 (77.0)	26.0 (78.8)	23.0 (73.4)	18.0 (64.4)	23.7 (74.7)
Average precipitation mm (inches)	1 (0.0)	1 (0.0)	1 (0.0)	4 (0.2)	9 (0.4)	27 (1.1)	62 (2.4)	105 (4.1)	55 (2.2)	12 (0.5)	1 (0.0)	1 (0.0)	279 (11.0)
Average relative humidity (%)	18	16	14	14	22	39	58	68	59	30	20	22	32
Mean monthly sunshine hours	275.9	265.6	303.8	297.0	288.3	267.0	269.7	263.5	261.0	272.8	273.0	257.3	3,294.9
Mean daily sunshine hours	8.9	9.4	9.8	9.9	9.3	8.9	8.7	8.5	8.7	8.8	9.1	8.3	9.0
Source: Arab Meteorology Book

== Facilities ==
There is a hospital with fewer than ten doctors but the women's services section is well-staffed and efficient. It is overseen by the DRAS, or regional medical director.

As it is the capital of the Hodh-el-Shargi Region, Nema has a Wali (regional governor), Maire (mayor for municipal affairs), and Hakim (deals with civil matters), in descending order of influence. There are eleven madrasas (primary schools), two colleges (middle schools), and a lycée (high school). These are overseen by the DREN, or regional education director. There is a Condition Feminine, or Women's Ministry, overseen by a woman appointed by the National government.

In addition, there are numerous NGOs (non-governmental organizations) present including Sante Sud, a French health organization. The Peace Corps (American) was present 2007–2008.

== Demographics ==
The cultural demographic is predominantly Moor, but there are Pulaar and Bambara present.

== Transport ==
Nema is close to the Malian border and there is constant traffic, either heading south to Mali via Adel Bagrou, East to Bassikounou and Léré (Mali) or north to the ancient town of Oualata (pronounced Walata).

Tourism from Europe picks up in November and December when the temperatures become bearable.

The city is served by the Néma Airport. The former carrier Mauritania Airways had flights from Néma to Nouakchott, Abidjan and Las Palmas. These destinations were served from October 2009 until December 2012.

The most common form of transport into and out of Nema is via car, though donkey cart, camel, and foot are always available. There is one hotel, Hotel Deraha, on the west side of the city right off the road.

Nema is bounded on the north and east sides by small mountain plateaus and provides many opportunities for hiking.

== Recent history ==
Al-Qaeda in the Islamic Maghreb (AQIM) became active in the desert regions of Mauritania, including Hodh El Chargui, in the summer of 2008. The area is considered dangerous to Western foreigners.
