= Tamdoult =

Tamdoult ⵜⴰⵎⴷⴷⵓⵍⵜ
- Site of medieval town
- Location within Morocco
- Coordinates: 29.296101°N 8.32481°W
- Country: Morocco
- Region: Souss-Massa
- Province: Tata
- Foundation date: 2nd century BC
- Founder: Berbers
- Time zone: UTC+0 (GMT)

Tamdult (also Tamedoult, Tamdlt; Arabic: تامدولت; Berber languages: ⵜⴰⵎⴷⴷⵓⵍⵜ) was a medieval city located near the Draa river south-east of Akka, Morocco. It was an important and flourishing stop in the Trans-Saharan trade route, linking Nul (Asrir), Ouadane, and Awdaghust to Sijilmasa, Massa and N'fis. The city was founded in the second century BC by the Berbers Shilha. In the ninth century one the sons of Idriss II, founder of the Idrisid dynasty, who had been given a principality in the Sous to reign over the Lamta tribe.

The city and its fortress were allegedly destroyed in the 14th century by a king of the Marinid dynasty. Today, the shrine of Sidi Mohamed ben Abdallah Ichanaoui is the only surviving structure in the ruins site.

The Shrine of Sidi Shanawil is one of a number of shrines in the Anti-Atlas honoring, according to local narratives, Jewish prophets who died on their way to these communities coming from Palestine.

== See also ==
- Akka
- Sijilmasa
- Sous
