= Ksar el Barka =

Ksar el Barka قصر البركة
- Commune and town
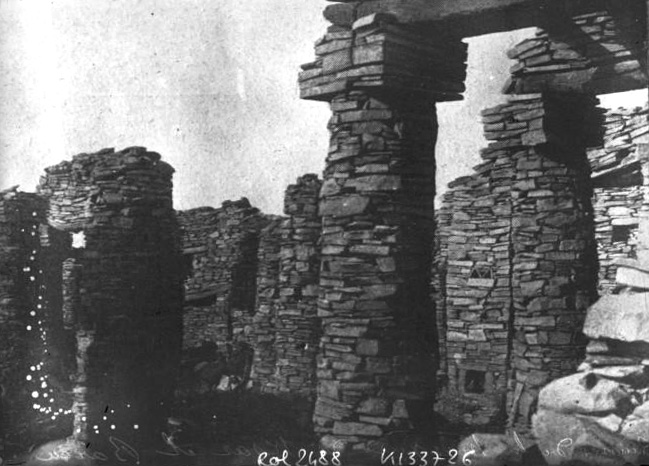
- Ksar-el-Barka in 1908

- Location in Mauritania
- Coordinates: 18°24′0″N 12°13′0″W
- Country: Mauritania
- Region: Tagant

Area
  - Total: 332.8 km^{2} (128.5 sq mi)

Ksar el Barka (Arabic: قصر البركة, Fula: Laaci-Wendu) is a ruined town in Mauritania.

== Geography ==
Ksar el Barka is located approximately 50km north of Moudjeria in the Tammourt en Naaj, a basin that collects runoff from the Tagant Plateau into Lake Gabou. The area has been an important center for pastoralism and agriculture for thousands of years.

== History ==
The Tagant Plateau was for centuries inhabited by Fula pastoralists and Soninke farmers. The Fula Jaawbe clan built their capital, Laaci-Wendu on the shores of Lake Gabou, a strategic location from which they could control the passes through the Assaba mountains. This town would later become Ksar el Barka. The Jaawbe were frequently raided by the Moors of Oualata. In the early 1100s they repulsed an invasion by the Lamtuna dynasty ruling Takrur, then invaded themselves and ruled Futa Toro from Laaci-Wendu as the Laam Termess dynasty. They would eventually be defeated by the Jolof Empire in 1456.

In 1690 the Kounta, who were from Ouadane and fleeing increasingly desertification, came to the area. There was still a Black African farming community there that the Kounta leader Muhammad Talib Wuld Bajid taxed to support religious scholars and warriors.

== See also ==
- Ksar
- Takrur
