= Bougadoum =

Bougadoum بوكادوم
- Commune and town
- Location in Mauritania
- Coordinates: 15°52′N 7°20′W
- Country: Mauritania
- Region: Hodh Ech Chargui

Government
  - Mayor: Mohamed Limam O/ Mohamed Vadel (PRDS)
- Elevation: 253 m (830 ft)

Population (2013 census)
  - Total: 40,341
- Time zone: UTC+0 (GMT)

Bougadoum is a town and commune in the Hodh Ech Chargui Region of south-eastern Mauritania.

In 2013, it had a census population of 40,341.
