= Museum of Ouadane =

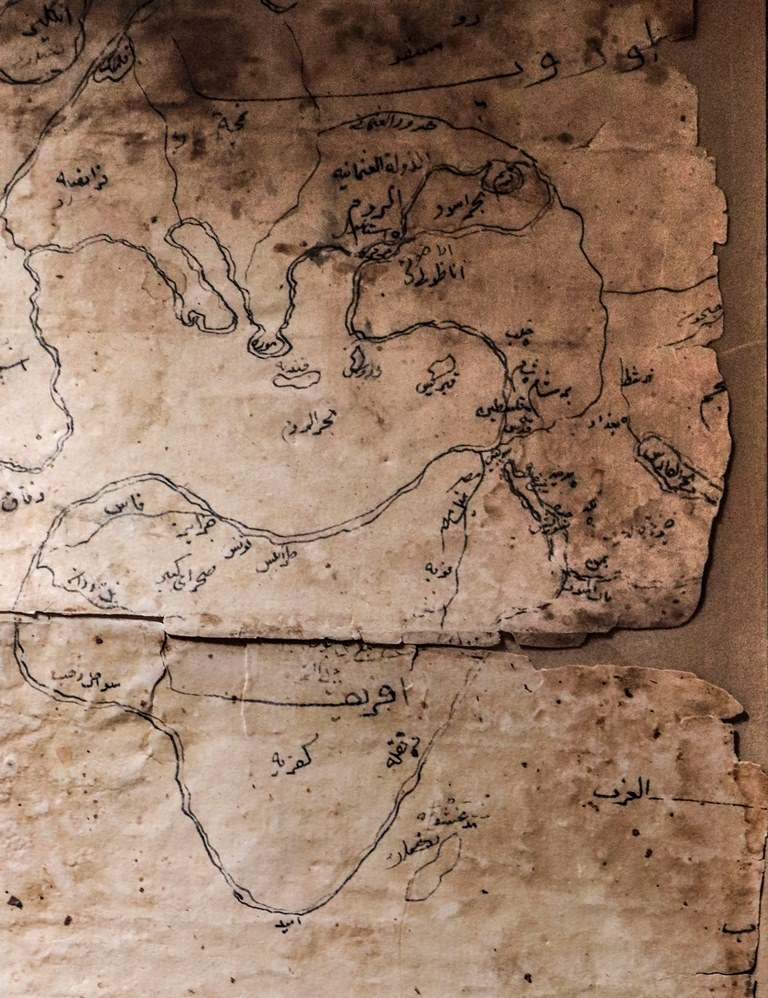
- Ancient Arabic World map
- Location: Ouadane, Mauritania
- Coordinates: 20°55′N 11°37′W
- Type: local museum
- Collections: Lithic tools, sherds, Arabic manuscripts

The Museum of Ouadane is a local museum in Ouadane, Mauritania. It is located in the old town of the World Heritage Site of Ouadane in a building called Maison des Armes.

== The collections of the museum ==
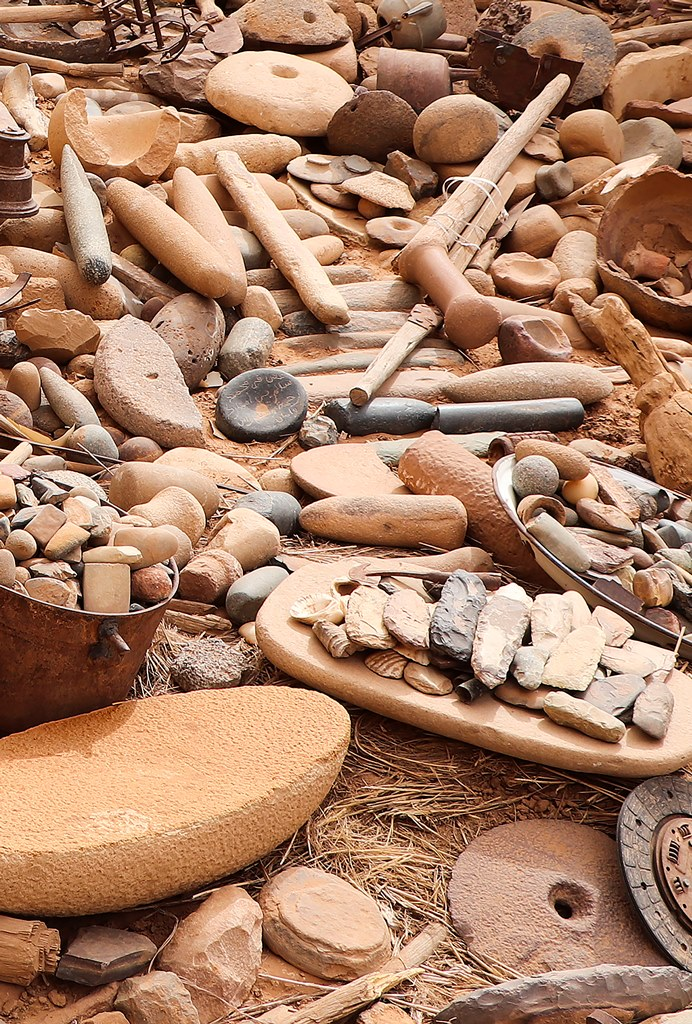
Cylinder-shaped rock gongs and quern-stones

Its collections present elements from the Neolithic to the colonial period, with lithic materials, ceramics, Arabic manuscripts and maps, and rockets fired at Ouadane during the Western Sahara conflict as well as assorted ethnographic odds and ends.

The museum is maintained by the Fondation Abidine Sidi pour la culture, le savoir et la protection du patrimoine Ouadane. At this time the museum is in disarray.
