= Ksar el Khali =

Ksar el Khali كصر الخالي
- Location in Mauritania
- Coordinates: 20°56′0″N 11°37′0″W
- Country: Mauritania
- Region: Adrar Region
- Department: Chinguetti

Ksar el Khali (Arabic: كصر الخالي) is a town in central-northern Mauritania. It is located in the Chinguetti Department in the Adrar Region.

Nearby towns and villages include Jraif (46.2 nm), Chinguetti (51.1 nm), and Casbah des Ait Maouine (86.5 nm).
