= Lake Gabou =

Lake and wetlands in Mauritania

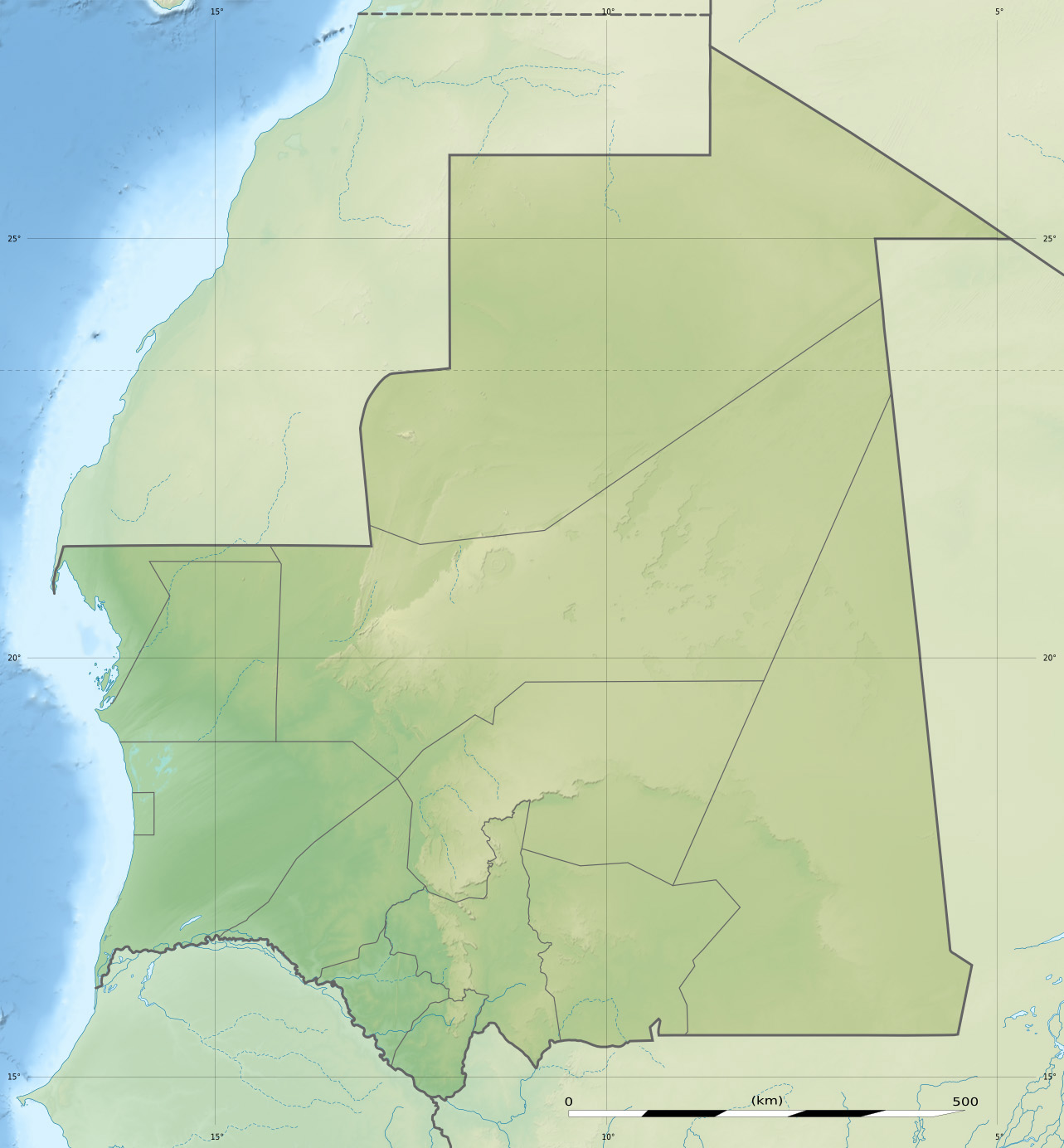
- Location within Mauritania
- Coordinates: 17°55′N 11°53′W
- Basin countries: Mauritania
- Surface area: 9,500 ha (37 sq mi)
- Settlements: Ksar el Barka

Ramsar Wetland
- Official name: Lac Gabou et le réseau hydrographique du Plateau du Tagant
- Designated: 13 February 2009
- Reference no.: 1854

Lake Gabou (Arabic: بحيرة كب, French: Lac Gabou, Fula: Hoorewendu) is a lake and wetlands area in the Tagant Region of Mauritania.

== History ==
Historically, the lake and the basin around it were also known as Tammourt en Naaj (Arabic: تمورت والنجا) or Hoorewendu, meaning 'head of the swamp' in Pulaar, and sheltered a population of hippopotami.

== Environment ==
The lake captures runoff from the Tagant plateau and supports a range of indigenous flora and fauna, including date and doum palms, two economically important palm species, as well as African baobabs and desert roses. It is also a refuge for West African crocodiles and migrating birds. It was designated a Ramsar site in 2009. The lake has been designated an Important Bird Area (IBA) by BirdLife International because it supports a significant population of wintering ruffs.
