= Battle of the Wagadou Forest (2024) =

Battle in the Mali War

- Part of Mali War
Date	April 5, 2024
Location	Wagadou Forest, Mali
Result	Indecisive: Non-aggression pact signed between both groups

Belligerents
CSP-DPA: MNLA; HCUA; MAA	Jama'at Nasr al-Islam wal Muslimin

Casualties and losses
- 10–20 killed on both sides

The battle of the Wagadou Forest occurred on April 5, 2024, when clashes broke out between the Strategic Framework for the Defense of the People of Azawad (CSP-DPA) against Jama'at Nasr al-Islam wal-Muslimin (JNIM) in the Wagadou forest, on the border between Mali and Mauritania. The clashes ended in a non-aggression pact between the two groups, allowing them to coordinate future attacks against the Malian Army and Wagner Group.

== Background ==
The Wagadou forest, located on the Malian-Mauritanian border, has been a hub of JNIM and previously Al-Qaeda in the Islamic Maghreb (AQIM) activity since the early 2000s. After the initial Tuareg rebellion of 2012 that saw jihadist Tuaregs and separatist Tuaregs attack the Malian government, the separatist groups signed the Algiers Accords in 2015 with the Malian government to combat the jihadist groups, eventually forming the CSP-DPA as a military-political coalition. The accords were broken by the Malian Army in mid-2023, and the Malian forces launched an offensive against the separatists.

== Battle ==
The battle began on April 5, 2024, between the CSP and JNIM in the forest, with the CSP claiming that JNIM was attempting to stop the CSP from establishing a foothold in the forest. The goal of the CSP's foothold was to plan an attack on a Malian military camp nearby, but these plans were broken when JNIM ambushed their encampment. RFI reported that around ten to twenty people were killed on both sides, and exact tolls are unknown. Many of the fighters killed on the CSP's side were from the MNLA.

Following the battle, HCUA secretary-general Alghabass Ag Intalla reached out to JNIM on behalf of the CSP to propose a non-aggression agreement. A message circulated on May 17 within JNIM ranks to not oppose the agreement. The agreement allowed for the free movement of fighters on both sides and the sharing of intelligence regarding the Malian Army and the Wagner Group, although did not permit joint CSP-JNIM attacks.
