= Battle of the Wagadou Forest (2019) =

Battle during the Mali War

- Part of the Mali War
Date	December 20–21, 2019
Location	Wagadou, Mali 15°18′N 7°28′W
Result	French victory

Belligerents
France	Katibat Macina

Casualties and losses
None	40 killed 4 trucks captured 4 motorcycles captured

Between December 20 and 21, 2019, French forces under Operation Barkhane launched an attack on Katibat Macina fighters in rural parts of the Wagadou forest near Wagadou, Mali.

== Attack ==
After having obtained information regarding the location of the militants in the days prior to the attack, French forces launched an operation on the night of December 20 and 21 to clear out a Katiba Macina camp. A helicopter assault with the aid of an MQ-9 Reaper was carried out against a camp in the densely wooded area, and then backed up by several dozen ground forces with helicopters for air defense. Clashes ended on the morning of December 21.

Clashes broke out again on December 21, when a group of commandos were ambushed by Katiba Macina militants while cleaning up the combat area. Two aircraft, a Reaper and a Mirage 2000, then struck the attackers. This was the first drone strike carried out by French forces.

== Aftermath ==
French president Emmanuel Macron stated that 33 jihadists were "neutralized" during the operation and one more had been captured, while two Malian gendarmes had been freed. Four pick-ups, including one equipped with an anti-aircraft gun, four motorcycles, and weaponry were seized.

In a second press release, the French Armed Forces announced seven more jihadists were killed, bringing the total to 40.
