= Néma (department) =

- Department
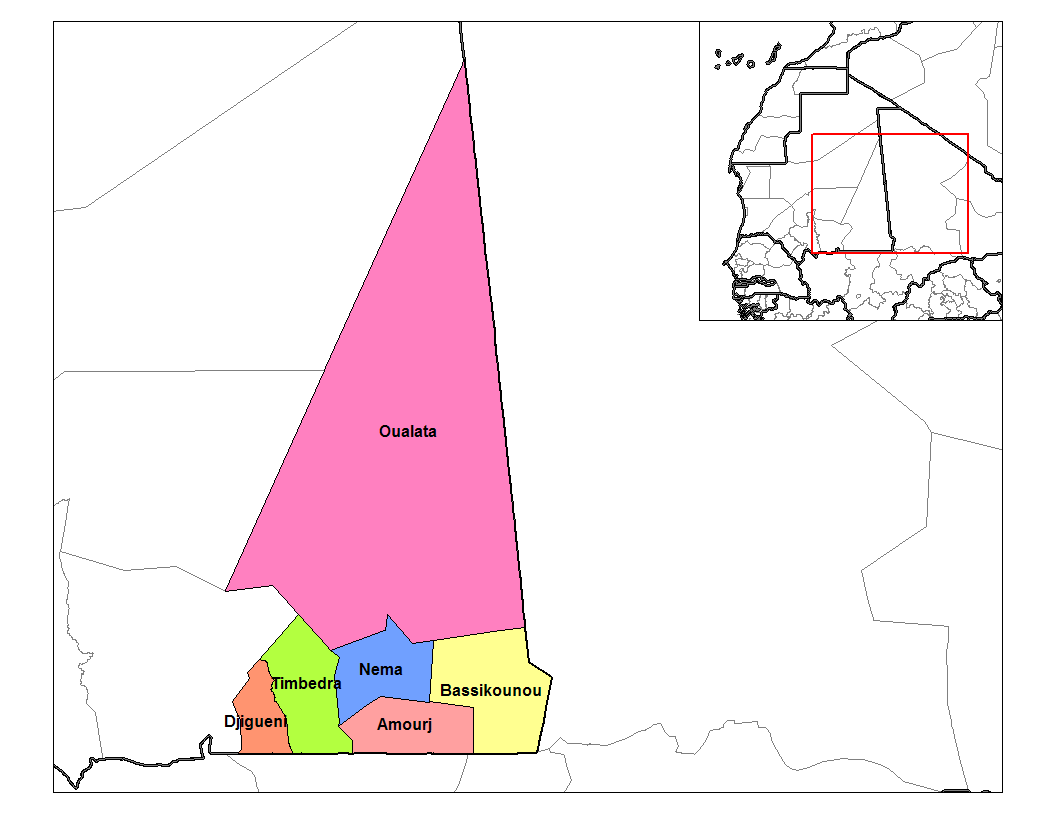

- Location within Mauritania
- Country: Mauritania

Area
  - Total: 9,601 km^{2} (3,707 sq mi)

Population (2013 census)
  - Total: 87,048
  - Density: 9.067/km^{2} (23.48/sq mi)

Néma is a department of Hodh Ech Chargui Region in Mauritania.

== See also ==
- Diade
