= Amourj =

- Commune and town
- Location in Mauritania
- Coordinates: 16°04′N 7°08′W
- Country: Mauritania
- Region: Hodh Ech Chargui Region

Area
  - Total: 65.10 km^{2} (25.14 sq mi)

Population (2013)
  - Total: 6,389
  - Density: 98.14/km^{2} (254.2/sq mi)

Amourj is a town in the Hodh Ech Chargui Region of eastern Mauritania near the frontier of Mali.

In 2013, it had a population of 6,389.
