= Bassiknou =

Bassiknou Bassikounou
- Commune and town
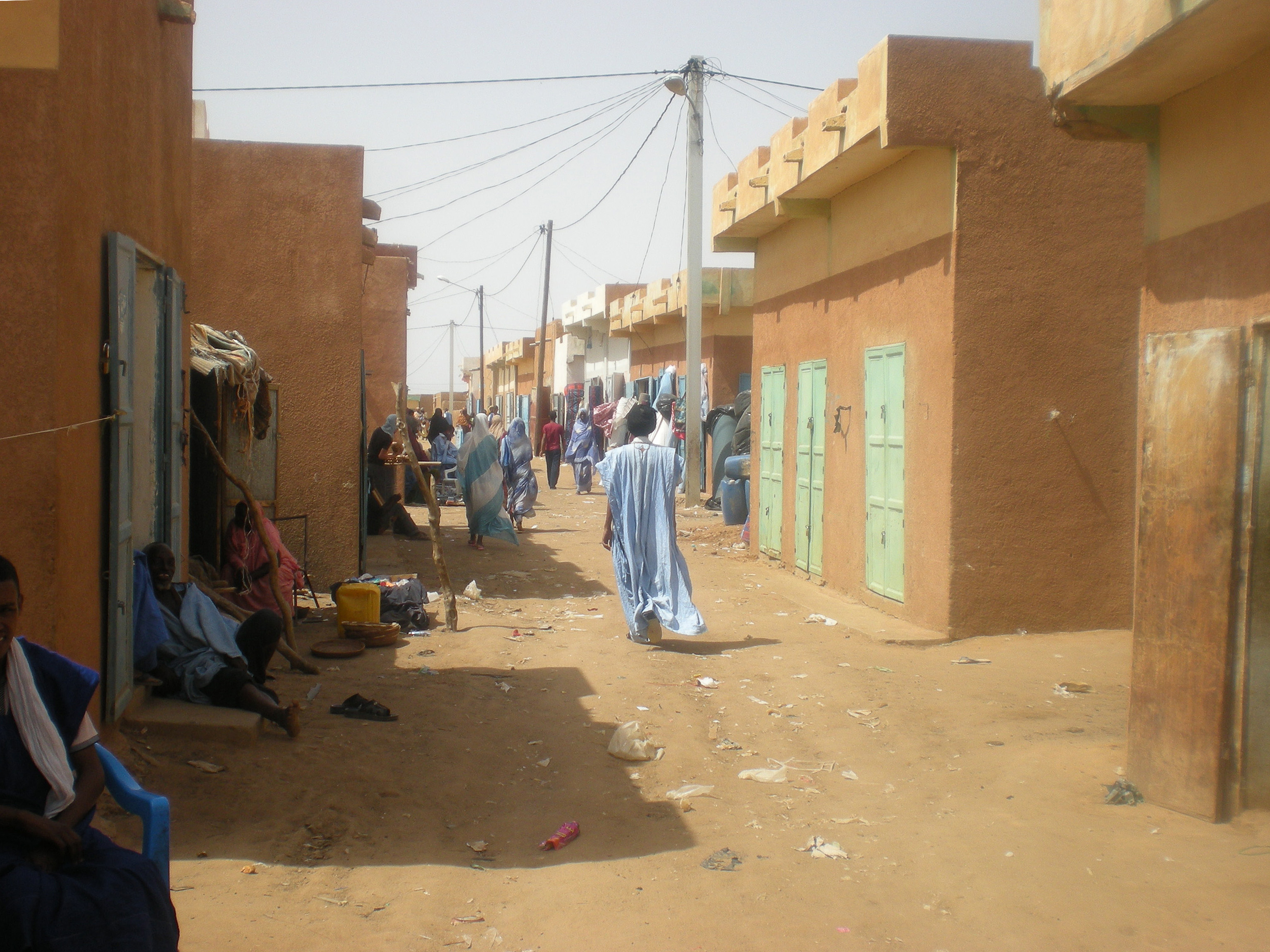
- A street in Bassikounou
- Interactive map of Bassiknou
- Location in Mauritania
- Coordinates: 15°51′54″N 5°57′13″W
- Country: Mauritania
- Region: Hodh Ech Chargui
- Department: Bassikounou (department)

Government
  - Mayor: Mohamed Sidi Hanena

Population (2023)
  - Total: 21,252
- Time zone: UTC+0 (GMT)

Bassiknou or Bassikounou is a town and commune in the Hodh Ech Chargui Region of south-eastern Mauritania.

In 2013, it had a population of 10,561. In 2023, it had a population of 21,252.

== History ==
The region around Bassikounou was a part of the Tichitt culture area. Oral traditions record that the founders of the city of Dia in the Inland Niger Delta originated from there.

On October 16, 2006 Bassikounou meteorite fall near the town of Bassikounou.

In July 2011, the town was the site of the Battle of Bassikounou, where Mauritanian armed forced defeated the jihadist AQIM group.

== Mbera refugee camp ==
Bassikounou and its surroundings have hosted tens of thousands of Malian refugees since the conflict there began in 2012, on top of other refugees who have lived there since the 1990s. This influx has stressed limited local resources of food, water, firewood, and grazing land.

Refugees in the 92,000-person refugee camp Mbera are supported by World Food Programme for more than 10 years.
