= Adel Bagrou =

Adel Bagrou عدل بكرو
- Commune and town
- Location in Mauritania
- Coordinates: 15°29′51″N 6°57′2″W
- Country: Mauritania
- Region: Hodh Ech Chargui

Government
  - Mayor: El Moctar Yoube Abdellahi

Area
  - Total: 396.3 km^{2} (153.0 sq mi)
- Elevation: 257 m (843 ft)

Population (2013 census)
  - Total: 37,048
  - Density: 93.48/km^{2} (242.1/sq mi)
- Time zone: UTC+0 (GMT)

Adel Bagrou is a town and commune in the Hodh Ech Chargui Region of south-eastern Mauritania. It is located near the border with Mali.

In 2023, it had a population of 37,048.
