= Bassikounou (department) =

Bassikounou باسكنو
- Department
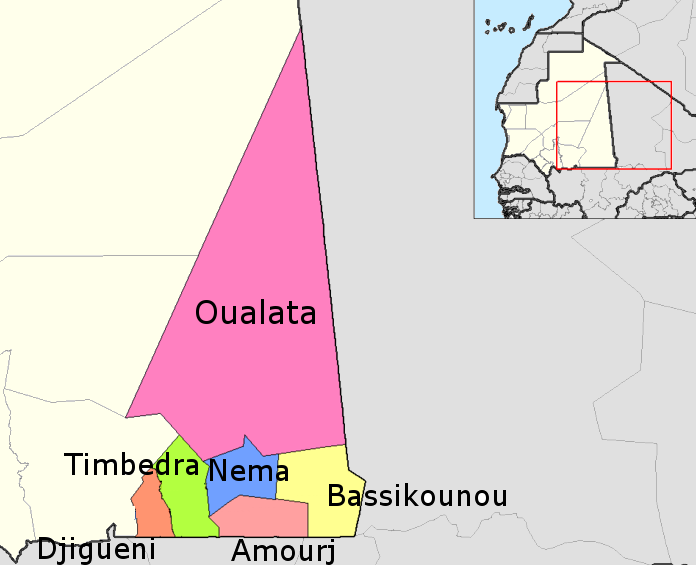

- Location within Mauritania
- Coordinates: 15°58′N 5°38′W
- Country: Mauritania

Area
  - Total: 6,617 sq mi (17,137 km^{2})

Population (2013 census)
  - Total: 88,432
  - Density: 13.365/sq mi (5.1603/km^{2})

Bassikounou is a department of Hodh Ech Chargui Region in Mauritania.
