= Tagant Plateau =

Coordinates: 18.4692°N 11.0522°W

Tagant Plateau الهضبة تكانت
- Natural region
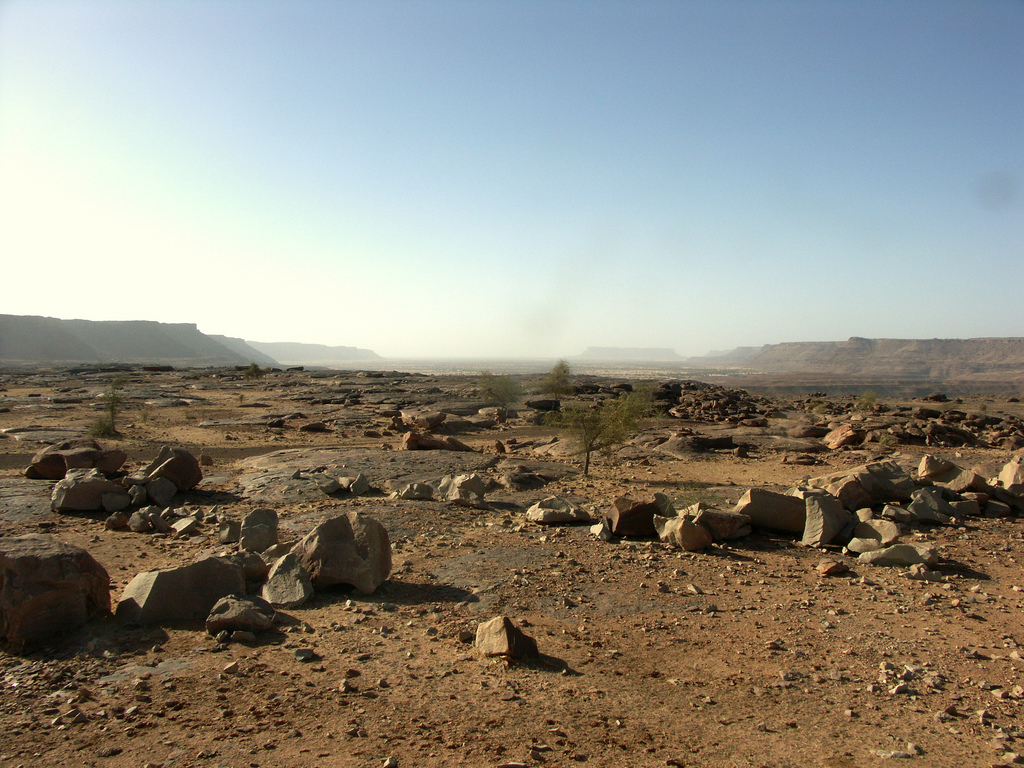
- Landscape of the Tagant region in Djouk

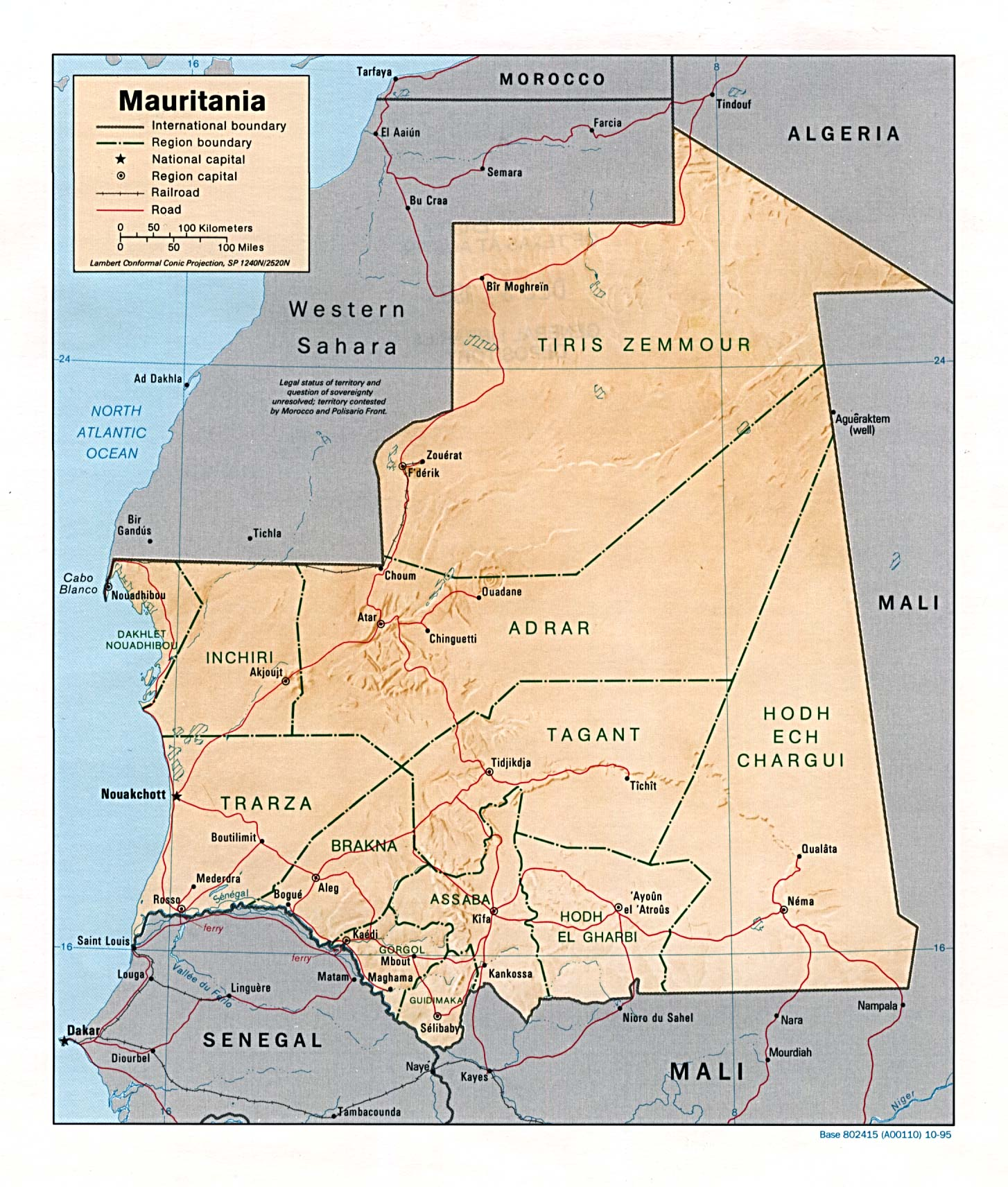
- Location of the Tagant plateau in Mauritania
- Country: Mauritania
- Elevation: 400 m (1,300 ft)

The Tagant Plateau is located in eastern Mauritania, forming a stony part of the Sahara Desert. The Tagant Region, a national administrative division, is named after the plateau.

== Geography ==
Some towns are located at the foot of the Tagant Plateau's slopes, which form cliffs in some places. Among these areas are Tichit, Moudjéria and Rachid. Tidjikdja lies on the Tagant itself. The Assaba Massif, where Late Ordovician glacial formations have been identified, is a southward prolongation of the Tagant Plateau. The Aoukar, the dry basin of a former lake lies beyond the southern escarpments of the Tagant Plateau.

== History ==
Beginning in mid-17th century, migrants from the Adrar Plateau region moved in and displaced the native population of the Tagant Plateau, the Toucouleur people, who now inhabit Futa Toro along the Senegal River.

The Tartega Gueltas oasis is one of the few wetlands in the region where there were still desert crocodiles in 1976. The population was reported to be extinct in 1996, but as of 2011 was still present, particularly in the Lake Gabou area.

== See also ==
- Dhar Tichitt
- Geography of Mauritania
