= Battle of the Wagadou Forest (2011) =

2011 battle on the Malian-Mauritanian border

- Part of the Insurgency in the Maghreb (2002–present)
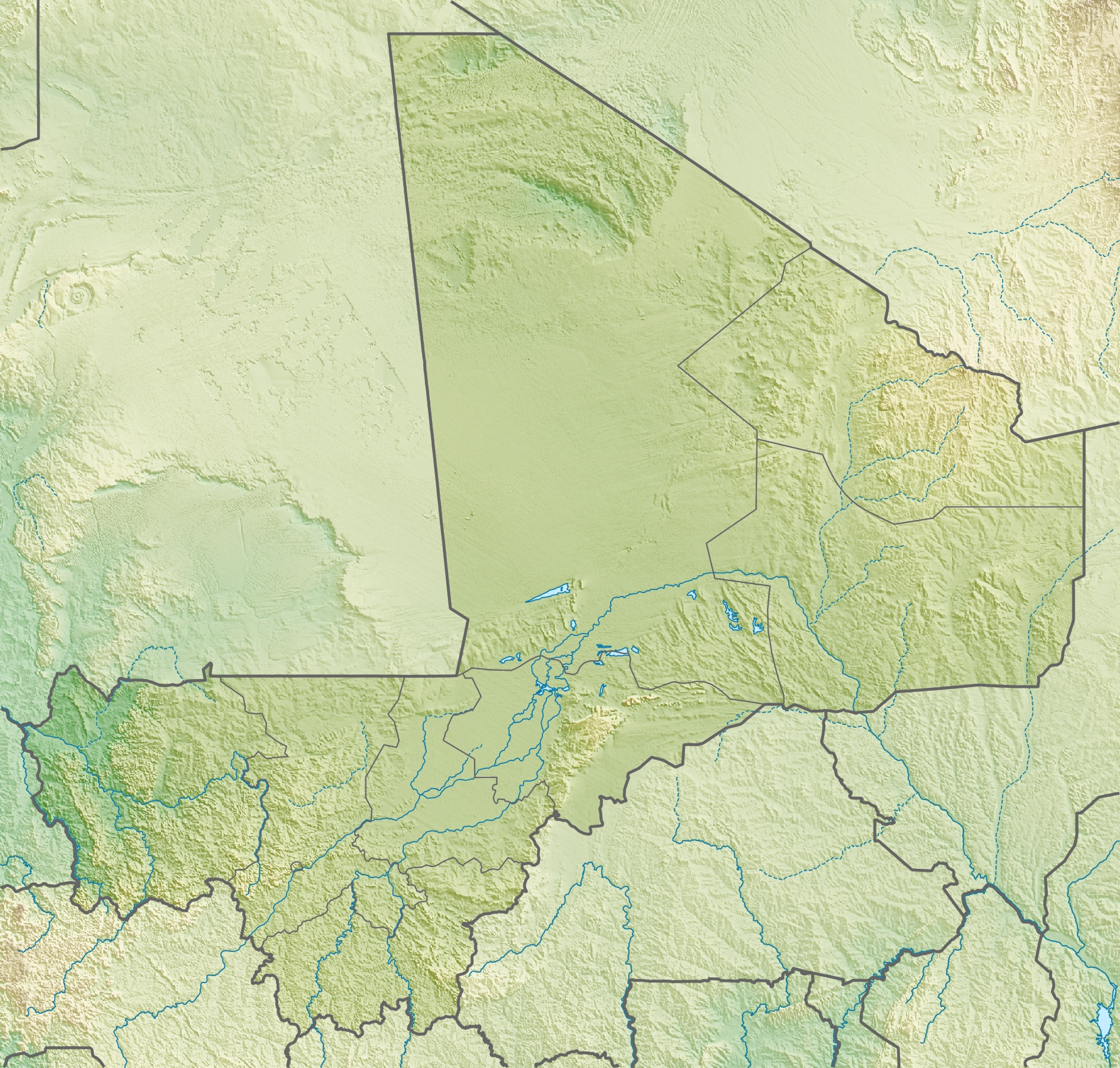
- Battle location (Mali)
Date	June 24, 2011; 15 years ago 17:45 UTC
Location	Wagadou Forest, near Nara, Mali 15°18′00″N 7°28′00″W
Result	Mauritanian-Malian victory

Belligerents
Mauritania; Mali	AQIM

Commanders and leaders
	Abdallah al-Chinguetti

Strength
Unknown; 2 Tucano aircraft Unknown	~15 men (per AQIM)

Casualties and losses
2 killed, 5 injured (per Mauritania); 20 killed (per AQIM); Unknown	15 killed, several dozen injured, 11 captured (per Mauritania); 2 missing (per AQIM)

On June 24, 2011, Malian and Mauritanian forces launched an offensive, codenamed Operation Benkan (meaning "unity" in Bambara), into the Wagadou Forest, an area on the Malian-Mauritanian border known as a hideout for Al-Qaeda in the Islamic Maghreb. While the joint forces were able to destroy the camp, some jihadists escaped.

== Background ==
The Wagadou Forest in northern Mali was a hub for Al-Qaeda in the Islamic Maghreb (AQIM) during the early 2010s and late 2000s, and the group launched multiple raids against Malian and Mauritanian forces from the forest between 2005 and 2011. The killing of al-Qaeda emir Osama bin Laden in Pakistan by American forces in May 2011 emboldened the Mauritanian and Malian governments to launch an offensive that would defeat al-Qaeda's affiliate AQIM.

== Battle ==
Malian and Mauritanian forces launched the joint offensive at 5:45 p.m. into the forest. AQIM jihadists were protected by deep trench networks and antipersonnel mines surrounding their base in the forest. Mauritanian special intervention groups, created to fight jihadist incursions, were supported by attack aircraft. A Malian commander on the ground stated that fighting was "very fierce." While Malian and Mauritanian forces were able to destroy the AQIM base, combing operations continued in the days following the battle for jihadists that had fled.

The Mauritanian Army released a statement announcing the deaths of two soldiers and seven injured, and that fifteen jihadists had been killed. The statement also claimed the injuries of several dozen jihadists, and that eleven more were captured by the Malian Army. AQIM claimed only fifteen of their fighters were present during the battle, and claimed the deaths of twenty Mauritanian soldiers and destruction of twelve vehicles. They also claimed that they had "no news" from two of their fighters.
