= Adrar region =

Region of Mauritania

Adrar ولاية أدرار
- Region
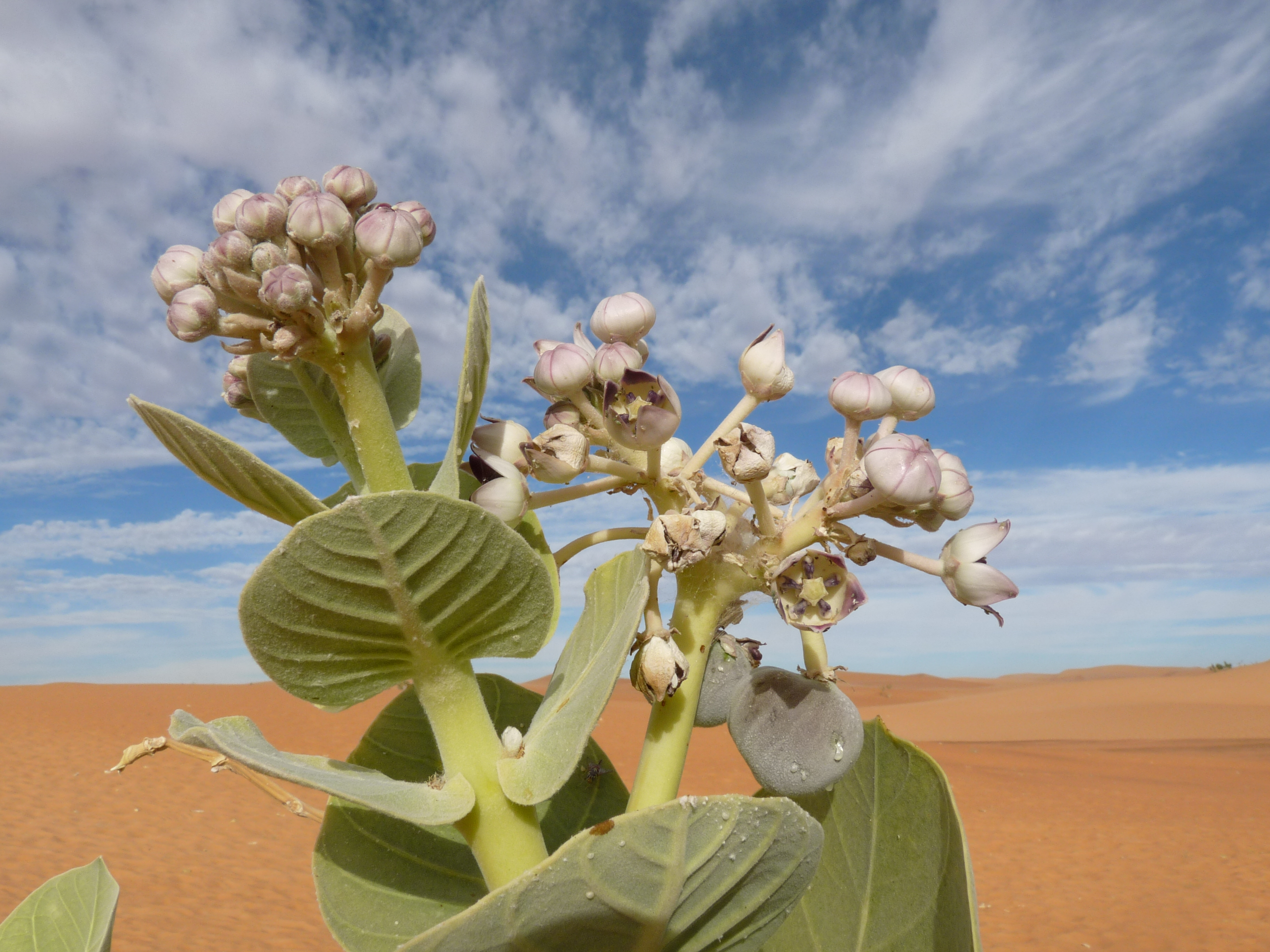
- Calotropis procera, Adrar desert

- Coordinates: 20°30′N 10°04′W
- Country: Mauritania
- Departments: 4: Aoujeft; Atar; Chinguetti; Ouadane
- Capital: Atar

Area
  - Total: 222,107 km^{2} (85,756 sq mi)

Population (2023 census)
  - Total: 71,623
  - Density: 0.32247/km^{2} (0.83520/sq mi)
- Time zone: UTC+0
  - Summer (DST): not observed
- ISO 3166 code: MR-07
- HDI (2017): 0.552 medium

Adrar (Arabic: ولاية أدرار, romanized: Wilāyat Adrār) is a large administrative region in Mauritania, named for the Adrar Plateau. The capital is Atar. Other major towns include Choum, Chinguetti and Ouadane. The region borders Western Sahara and the Mauritanian region of Tiris Zemmour to the north, Mali and the Mauritanian region of Hodh Ech Chargui to the east, the Mauritanian regions of Trarza and Tagant to the south and the Mauritanian region of Inchiri to the west.

As of 2013, the population of the region was 62,658, compared to 77,812 in 2011. There were 49.19 per cent females and 50.81 per cent males. As of 2008, the literacy rate for people aged 15 years and over was 50.30%. The total net enrolment ratio at secondary level was 7.10%. As of 2008, the activity rate was 48.20% and economic dependency ratio was 0.84.

== Demographics ==
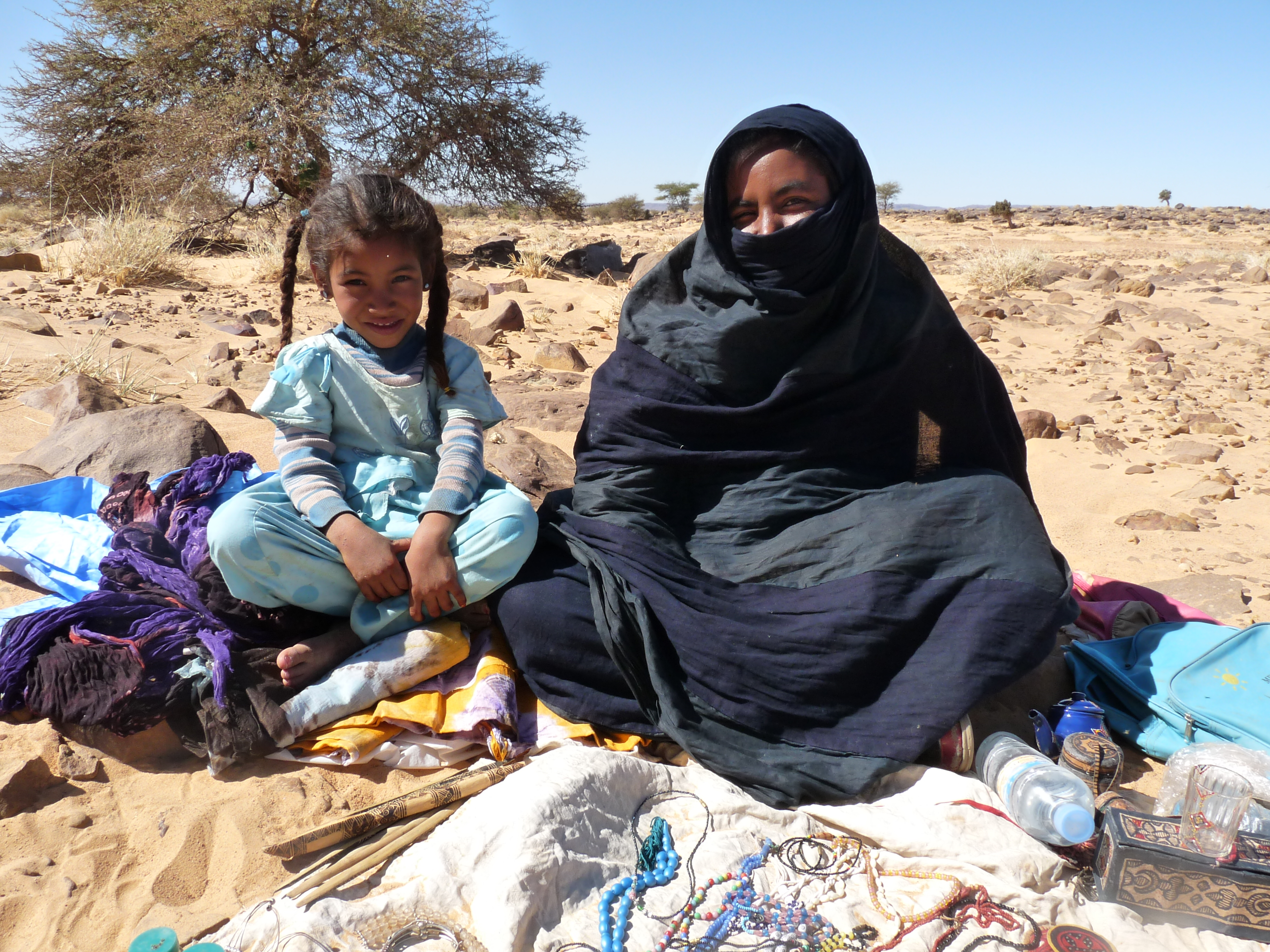
Mother and daughter selling handicrafts, Adrar Region.

Historical population
Year	Pop.	±% p.a.
1977	55,354	—
1988	61,043	+0.89%
2000	69,542	+1.09%
2013	62,658	−0.80%
2023	71,623	+1.35%

As of 2013, the population of the region was 62,658, compared to 77,812 in 2011. There were 49.19% females and 50.81% males. As of 2008, the activity rate was 48.20 and economic dependency ratio was 0.84. The fraction of people working in government was 19.20%, individual / household private was 12.60%, other was 61.00%, para public was 2.60%, and private enterprise was 4.60%. The Grand Total as of 2008 was 737.74. As of 2007, the number of tourist establishments in the region was 5.

As of 2008, the Couples with children was 37.30 and Couples without children was 3.10. The proportion with extended family was 26.00% and extended single-parent was 12.10%, one-person was 6.60%, and single-parent nuclear was 15.00%.

== Economy and health ==
As of 2008, the literacy rate for people aged 15 years and over was 50.30. The net enrollment ratio of girls for secondary level was 7.00 per cent, net enrollment ratio of boys for secondary level was 7.20 per cent, and total net enrollment ratio at secondary level was 7.10 per cent. As of 2013, the coverage rate of DPT3 Children From 0 to 11 Months in the region was 49.80 per cent, BGC vaccination was 52.60 and polio vaccination coverage was 49.80.

As of 2008, the rate of household confirming the existence of public telephone in their neighborhood or village was 69.24, rate of households benefiting from electricity post in their neighborhood was 3.08 per cent, rate of households benefiting from health center or health post in their neighborhood was 2.29 per cent, and rate of households receiving the services public telephone was 2.68 per cent.

== Geography ==
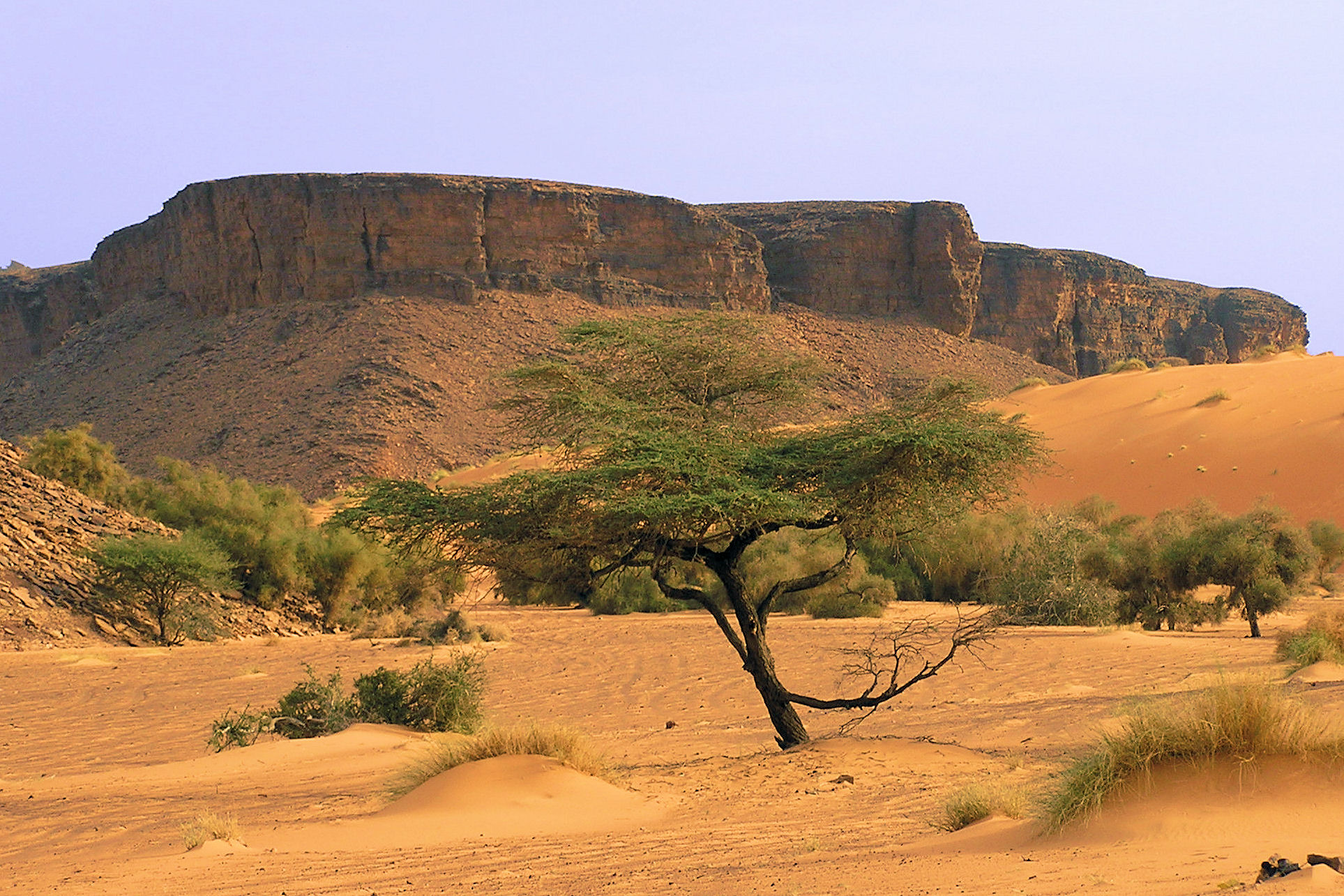
Adrar Plateau

Mauritania is mostly covered with desert, with only its western regions around the coast of Atlantic Ocean having some vegetation. There are some oasis in the desert regions. Since it is a desert, there are large shifting dunes forming temporary ranges. The average elevation is around 460 m (1,510 ft) above the mean sea level. The rainfall in the northern regions closer to the Tropic of Cancer receives around 100 mm (3.9 in) of annual rainfall compared to the southern portions that receives around 660 mm (26 in). The average temperature is 37.8 °C (100.0 °F), while during the night it reaches 0 °C (32 °F).

Due to the geography, the inhabitants historically, have been nomadic. In modern times, people have migrated to urban centers during the drought in the 1970s and the early 1980s. There are a few sedentary cultivators, who are located only in the Southern regions of the country. Research has indicated that the Saharan movement has resulted in reduction of rains in the region from the 1960s, when it received close to 250 mm (9.8 in) of rainfall.

== Local administration ==
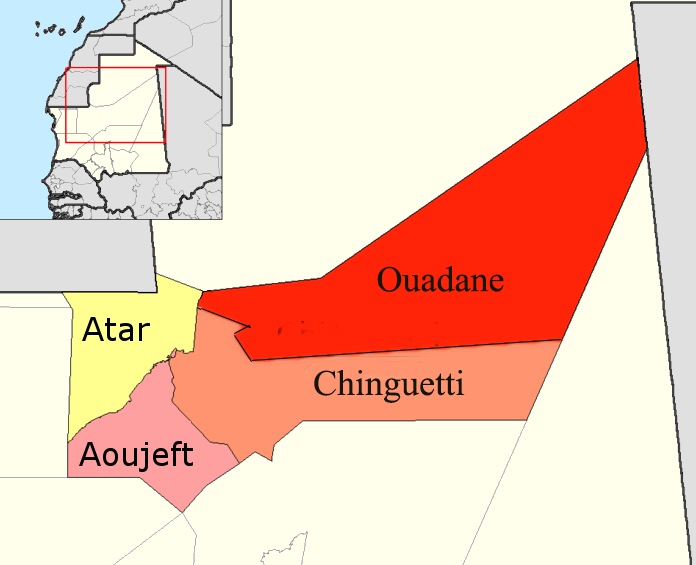
Departments of Adrar

The local administration is adopted from French local administration framework with a Ministry of Internal Control governing the local bodies. The original administration was held by Governors of each district, but after the municipal elections in 1994, the powers has been decentralized from the district bodies. Mauritania has been divided into 13 wilayas (regions), including the Nouakchott Capital District. The smallest administrative division in the country is the commune and the country has 216 of them. A group of communes form a moughataa (department) and the group of moughataa form a district. There are total of 53 moughataa for the 13 districts in the country. The executive power of the district is vested on a district chief, while it is on hakem for moughataa. Out of the 216 communes, 53 classified as urban, and the remaining 163 are rural.

The communes are responsible for overseeing and coordinating development activities and are financed by the state. The Local Governments have their own legal jurisdiction, financial autonomy, an annual budget, staff, and an office. The elections for the local government are conducted every five years along with Regional and Parliamentary elections. On account of the political instability, the last elections were held in 2023.

Adrar is divided into four departments, namely, Aoujeft Department, Atar Department, Chinguetti Department and Ouadane Department.

== See also ==
- Regions of Mauritania
- Departments of Mauritania
- Communes of Mauritania
