= Ouadane =

Ouadane Arabic: وادان
- Commune and town
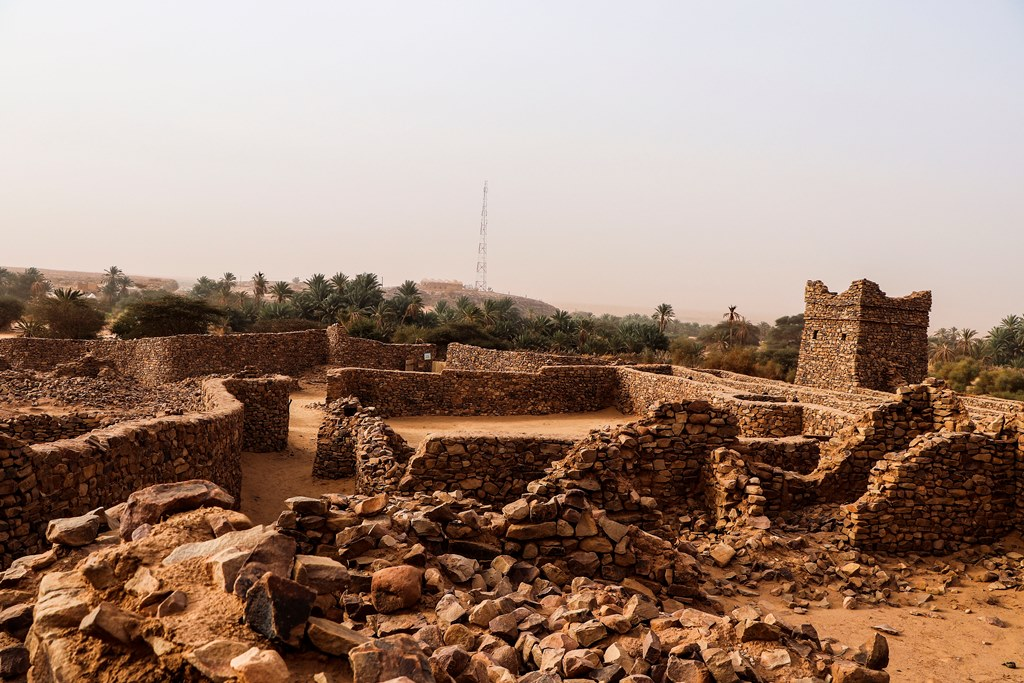
- Old tower, Ouadane

- Location in Mauritania
- Coordinates: 20°55′N 11°37′W
- Country: Mauritania
- Region: Adrar Region

Area
  - Total: 118,210 km^{2} (45,640 sq mi)
- Elevation: 407 m (1,335 ft)

Population (2023 census)
  - Total: 3,833
  - Density: 0.03243/km^{2} (0.08398/sq mi)

UNESCO World Heritage Site
- Official name: Ancient Ksour of Ouadane, Chinguetti, Tichitt and Oualata
- Type: Cultural
- Criteria: iii, iv, v
- Designated: 1996 (20th session)
- Reference no.: 750
- Region: Arab States

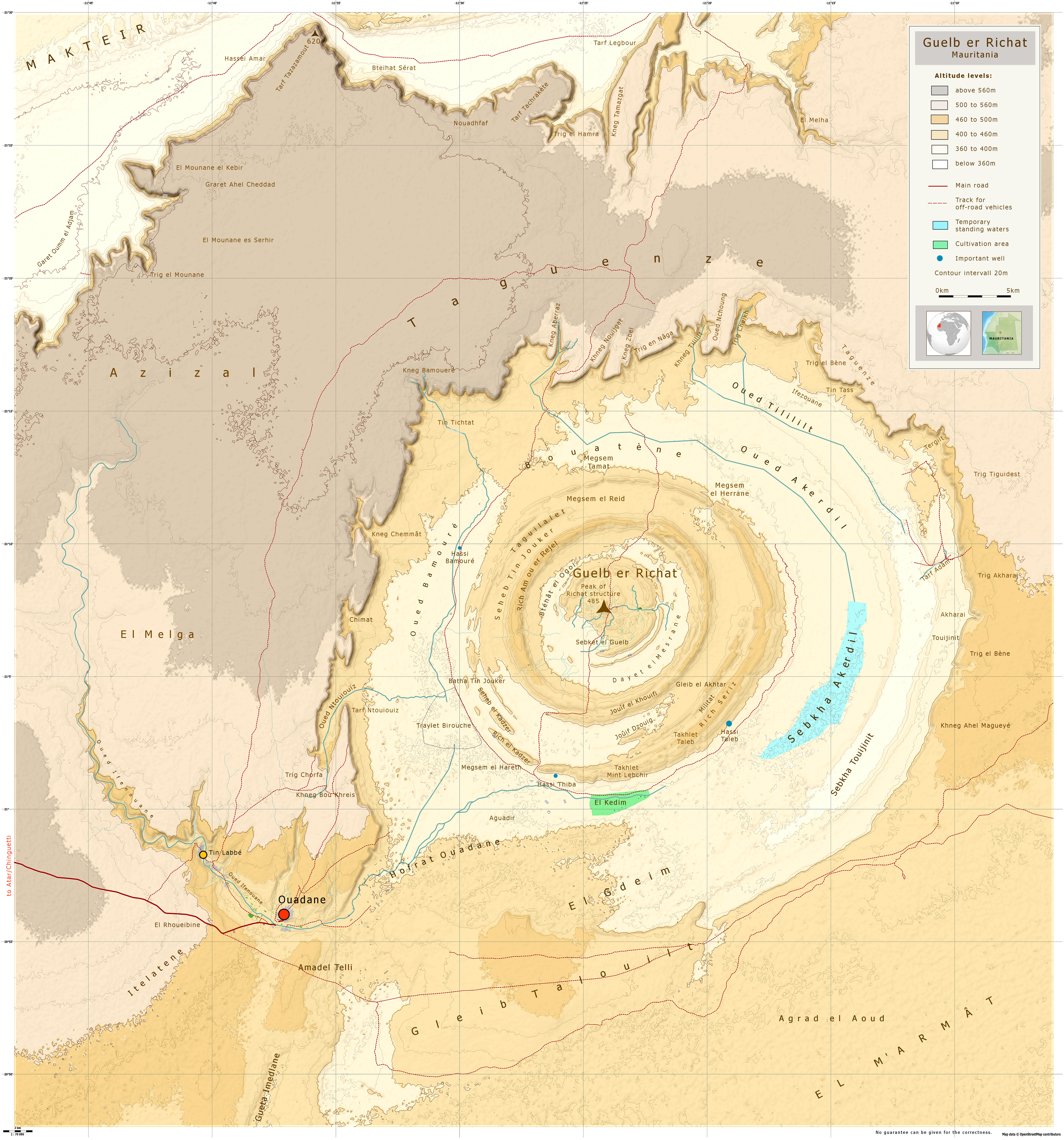
Topographic map of Ouadane and the Richat Structure

Trade routes of the Western Sahara desert c. 1000–1500. Goldfields are indicated by brown shading.

Ouadane or Wādān (Arabic: وادان) is a small town in the desert region of central Mauritania, situated on the southern edge of the Adrar Plateau, 93 kilometres (58 mi) northeast of Chinguetti. The town was a staging post in the trans-Saharan trade and for caravans transporting slabs of salt from the mines at Idjil.

The old town, a World Heritage Site, though in ruins, is still substantially intact, while a small modern settlement lies outside its gate.

Ouadane is the closest town to the Richat Structure, a massive circular landmark visible from space.

The whole Ouadane commune has a total size of 118,210 square kilometres (45,640 sq mi), mostly consisting of desert. The main town is located in the south-west of the commune.

== History ==
The early history of Ouadane is uncertain but it is possible that the town prospered from the trans-Saharan gold trade. In the middle of the 11th century, the Arabic geographer al-Bakri described a trans-Saharan route that ran between Tamdoult near Akka in Morocco to Aoudaghost on the southern edge of the Sahara. This route was used for the transport of gold during the time of the Ghana Empire. In his account al-Bakri mentioned a series of place names but these have not been identified and historians have suggested several possible routes. In 1961 the French historian Raymond Mauny proposed a route that passed through Ouadane but Suzanne Daveau later argued in favour of a more direct route that crossed the Adrar escarpment to the east of the town. The volume of caravan traffic would have declined from the beginning of the 13th century when the oasis town of Oualata located 360 kilometres (220 mi) to the east replaced Aoudaghost as the southern terminus of the trade route.

The first written reference to the town is in Portuguese by Ca' de Mosto in middle of the 15th century in a muddled account that confused the salt mines of Idjil with those of Taghaza. At about the same date Gomes Eanes de Zurara described Ouadane as the most important town of the Adrar region and the only one with a surrounding wall. Fifty years later Valentim Fernandes wrote a detailed account of the trade in slabs of salt from the Idjil mines and role of Ouadane as an entrepôt. He described Ouadane as a 'town' with a population of 400 inhabitants. By contrast Duarte Pacheco Pereira in his Esmeraldo de situ orbis (written in 1505-1508) described the town as having approximately "300 hearths" which would suggest between 1,500 and 1,800 people. The Idjil sebkha lies roughly 240 kilometres (150 mi) northwest of Ouadane, to the west of the town of Fderîck. The date when salt was first extracted from the sebkha is unknown. It is usually assumed that exploitation of the Idjil mines began after the mid 11th century as al-Bakri did not mention them. Instead he described a salt mine at a place that he called 'Tatantal'. Historians have usually assumed this corresponds to Tegahza but his description could possibly also apply to the mines at Idjil.

According to Pereira, in 1487 the Portuguese built an entrepôt in Ouadane in an attempt to gain access to the trans-Saharan gold, salt and slave trade. The entrepôt was probably short lived and is not mentioned in the detailed description provided by Fernandes.

In the 16th century the Moroccans made various attempts to take control of the trans-Saharan trade in salt and especially that in gold from the Sudan. They organised military expeditions to occupy Ouadane in 1543-44 and again in 1584. Then in 1585 they occupied Taghaza and finally in 1591 their victory in the Battle of Tondibi led to the collapse of the Songhay Empire.

Tegherbeyat, the upper ruined section of the town, is almost certainly the oldest. It would have originally contained a mosque but nothing has survived. The ruins of the lower section of the town include a mosque that was probably built in the 15th century when the town expanded. Some of the horseshoe arches are still standing and some walls still have the remains of clay plaster, suggesting that the mosque was abandoned sometime in the 19th century.

The mosque measured 24 metres (79 ft) north–south at its eastern end and 17 metres (56 ft) north–south at its western end where the minaret would have stood. From east to west it would have measured 15 metres (49 ft). The terrace was supported by five rows of horseshoe arches. At the eastern end are the remains of an external mirhab and a courtyard measuring 13 by 12 metres (43 by 39 ft) that would have been used in hot weather.

== Gallery ==
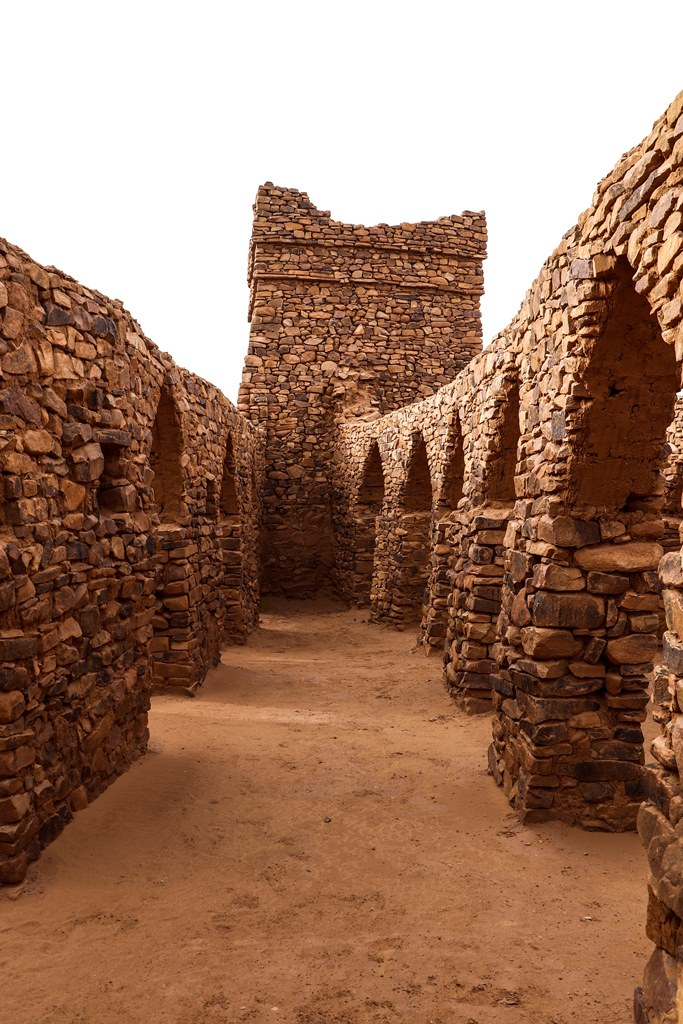
Mosque of old Ouadane

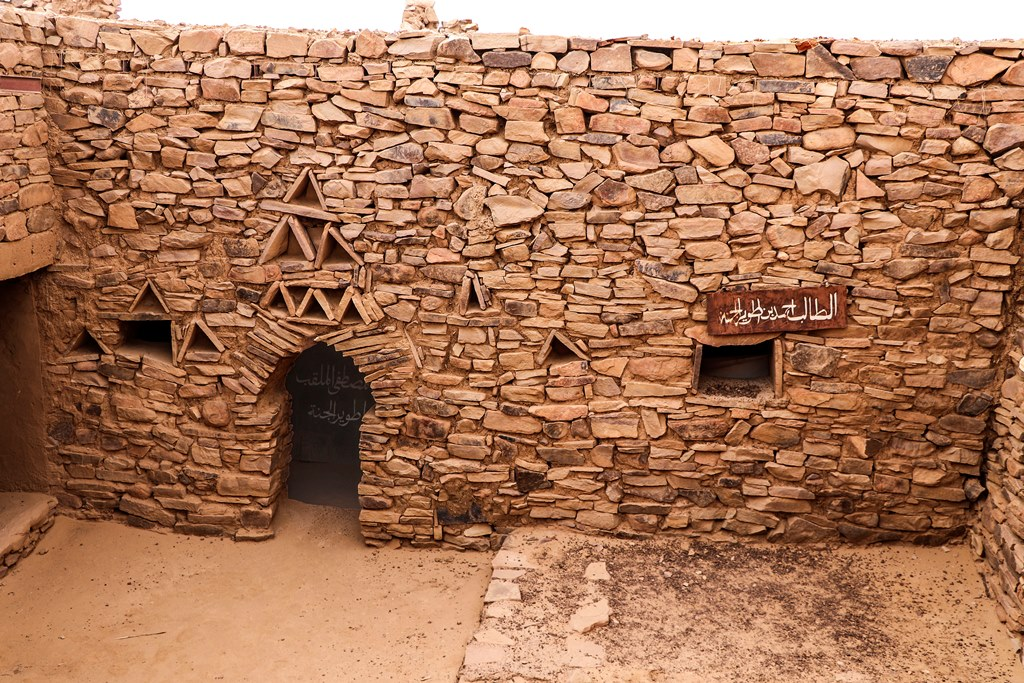
Reconstructed house of el-Hadj Ethmane, one of the founders of Ouadane

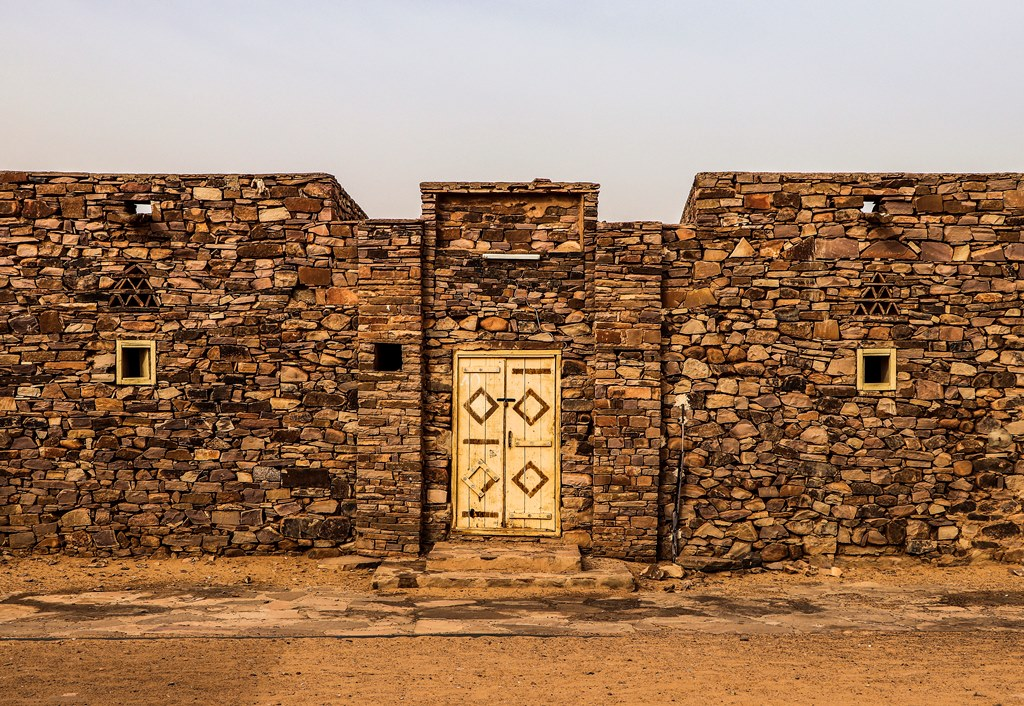
New town of Ouadane: Building constructed in traditional style

== See also ==
- Ancient Ksour of Ouadane, Chinguetti, Tichitt and Oualata
- Museum of Ouadane

== Sources ==
- Daveau, Suzanne (1970), "Itinéraire de Tamadalt à Awdaghast selon al-Bakri", in Robert, Denise; Robert, Serge; Devisse, Jean (eds.), Tegdaoust I: Researches sur Aoudaghost (in French), Paris: Arts et Métiers Graphiques, pp. 33–38.
- Fernandes, Valentim (1938), Description de la côte d'Afrique, de Ceuta au Sénégal: par Valentim Fernandes (1506-1507) (in Portuguese and French), Cénival, Pierre de; Monod, Théodore eds. and trans., Paris: Larose.
- Levtzion, Nehemia (1973), Ancient Ghana and Mali, London: Methuen, ISBN 0-8419-0431-6. Reprinted by Holmes & Meier in 1980.
- Levtzion, Nehemia; Hopkins, John F.P., eds. (2000) [1981], Corpus of Early Arabic Sources for West Africa, New York, NY: Marcus Weiner Press, ISBN 1-55876-241-8.
- Mauny, Raymond (1961), Tableau géographique de l'ouest africain au moyen age, d'après les sources écrites, la tradition et l'archéologie (in French), Dakar: Institut français d'Afrique Noire.
- McDougall, E. Ann (1990), "Salts of the Western Sahara: myths, mysteries, and historical significance", International Journal of African Historical Studies, 23 (2): 231–257, JSTOR 219336.
- Pereira, Duarte Pacheco (1937), Esmeraldo de situ orbis, Kimble, George H.T., trans. and ed., London: Hakluyt Society. The Portuguese text is available online from the Internet Archive.
- Prudhomme, (Commandant) (1925), "La sebkha d'Ijil (Mauritanie)" (PDF), Bulletin du Comité de'études historiques et scientifiques de l'Afrique occidentale française (in French), 8 (2): 212–216.
- Robert, Denise; Robert, Serge (1972), "Douze années de recherches archéologique en république islamique de Mauritanie", Annales de la faculté de lettres et sciences humaines (in French), 2, Université de Dakar: 195–233.
- Schefer, M. Charles, trans. (1895), Relation des voyages à la côte occidentale d'Afrique d'Alvise de Ca' da Mosto, 1445-1457 (in French), Paris: E. Leroux.
- Zurara, Gomes Eanes de (1960), Chronique de Guinée (1453) (in French), Bourdon, Léon, trans., Dakar: Institut français d'Afrique noire.
