= Hodh Ech Chargui region =

Region of Mauritania

Hodh ech Chargui ولاية الحوض الشرقي
- Region of Mauritania
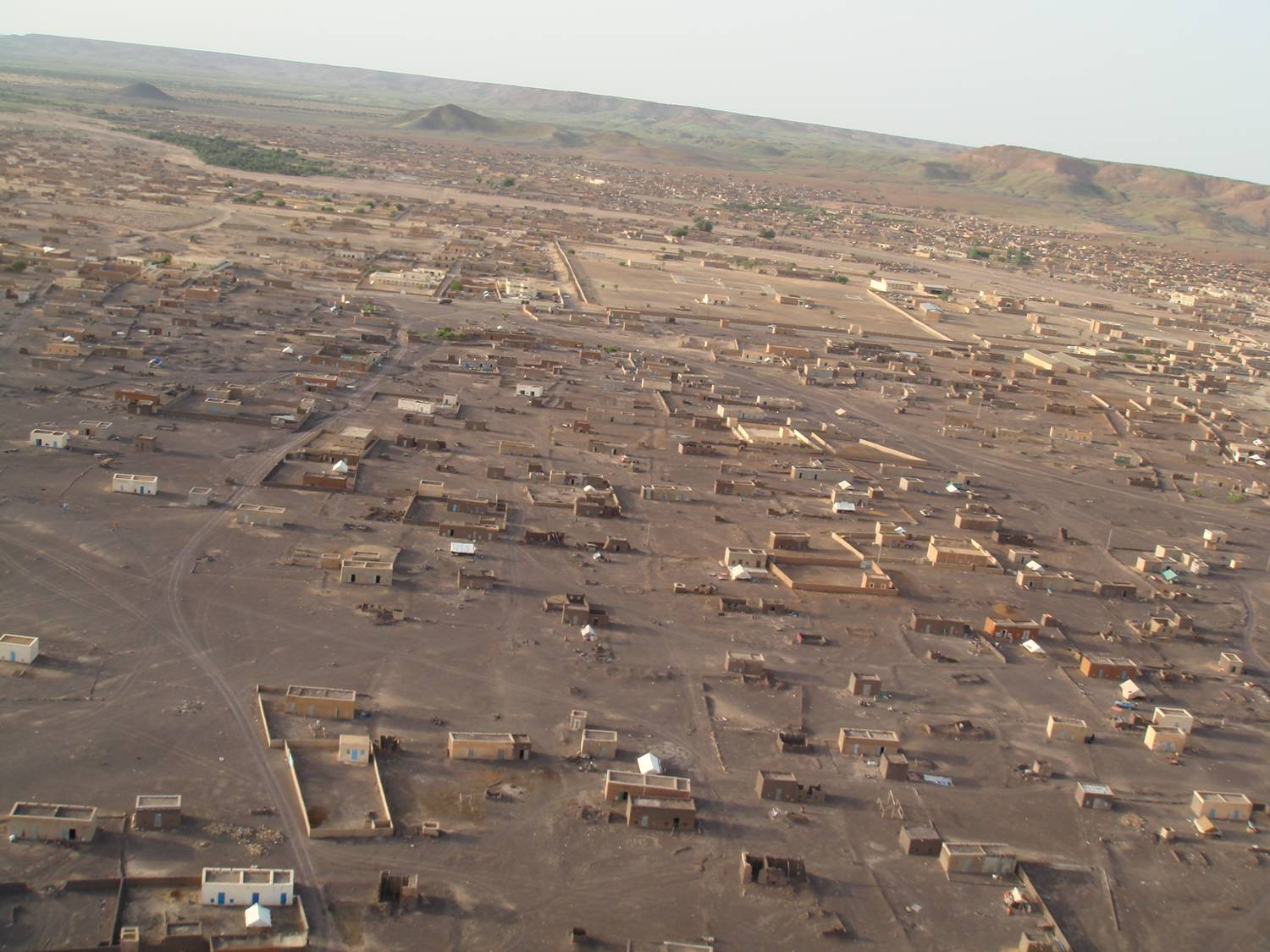

- Coordinates: 19°00′N 7°15′W
- Country: Mauritania
- Departments: 7: Amourj; Bassiknou; Djiguenni; Néma; Oualata; Timbédra; N'Beiket Lahwach
- Capital: Néma

Area
  - Total: 182,700 km^{2} (70,500 sq mi)

Population (2023 census)
  - Total: 625,643
  - Density: 3.424/km^{2} (8.869/sq mi)
- Time zone: UTC+0
  - Summer (DST): not observed
- ISO 3166 code: MR-01
- HDI (2017): 0.457 low

Hodh Ech Chargui (Arabic: ولاية الحوض الشرقي, romanized: Wilāyat al-Ḥawḍ al-Sharqī, lit. 'Eastern Basin Region') is a large region in eastern Mauritania, with an area of 182,700 km^{2}. Its capital is Néma, but the largest town, in Bassiknou Department, is Fassala (or Vassale) at the extreme southeast of Mauritania, with 65,927 inhabitants at the 2013 census. The region borders the Mauritanian regions of Adrar, Tagant and Hodh El Gharbi to the west and Mali to the east and south. The Aoukar basin, which formerly gave name to a greater region, is located in the western part of Hodh Ech Chargui.

As of 2013, the population of the region was 430,668, compared to 363,071 in 2011. There were 47.71 percent females and 52.29 percent males. As of 2008, the activity rate was 61.50 and economic dependency ratio was 1.11. As of 2008, the literacy rate for people aged 15 years and over was 53.90.

The local government is headed by an elected district representative, while the elections for the local government are conducted every five years. The last elections were held in 2023.

== Geography ==
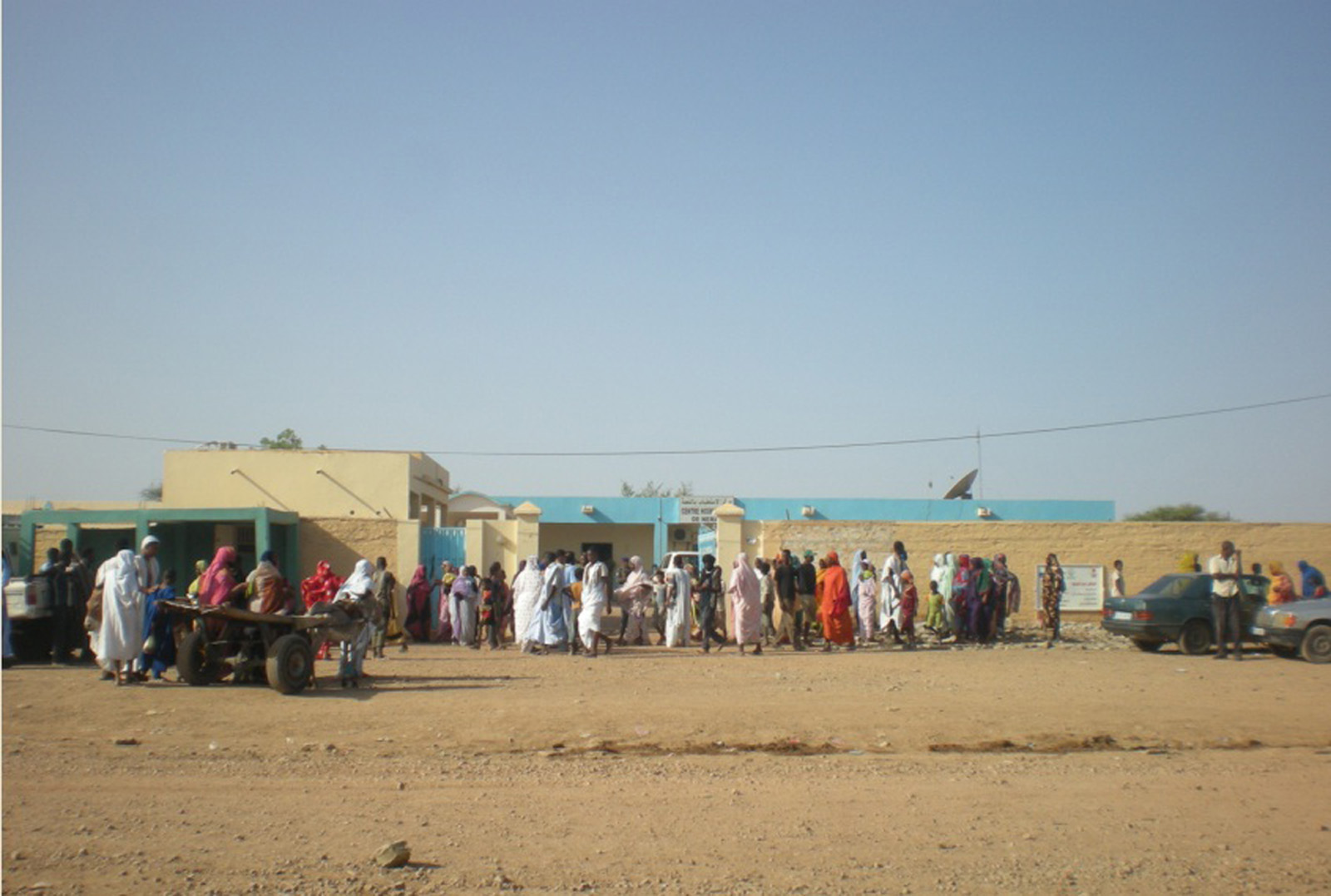
A settlement in Néma

Mauritania is mostly covered with desert, with only its western regions around the coast of Atlantic Ocean having some vegetation. There are some oasis in the desert regions. Since it is a desert, there are large shifting dunes forming temporary ranges. The average elevation is around 460 m (1,510 ft) above the mean sea level. The northern regions closer to the Tropic of Cancer receive around 100 mm (3.9 in) of annual rainfall compared to the southern portions that receive around 660 mm (26 in). The average temperature is 37.8 °C (100.0 °F), while during winter nights it may even reach 0 °C (32 °F).

Due to the geography, the inhabitants historically, have been nomadic. In modern times, people have migrated to urban centres during the drought in the 1970s and the 1980s. There are a few sedentary cultivators, who are located only in the Southern regions of the country. Research has indicated that the Saharan movement has resulted in reduction of rains in the region from the 1960s, when it received close to 250 mm (9.8 in) of rainfall.

From 1 September to 8 September 2020, torrential rains topping 100mm fell near the border with Mali, causing widespread damage, particularly in the Bassiknou department.

== Demographics ==
Historical population
Year	Pop.	±% p.a.
1977	156,721	—
1988	212,203	+2.79%
2000	281,600	+2.39%
2013	430,668	+3.32%
2023	625,643	+3.81%

As of 2013, the population of the region was 430,668, compared to 363,071 in 2011. There were 47.71 per cent females and 52.29 per cent males.

As of 2008, the rate of household confirming the existence of public telephone in their neighbourhood or village was 57.70, rate of households benefiting from electricity post in their neighbourhood was 1.99 per cent, rate of households benefiting from health center or health post in their neighbourhood was 13.62 per cent, and rate of households benefiting from sanitary services was 0.40 per cent. As of 2008, the couples with children was 45.60 and couples without children was 5.10. The proportion with extended family was 19.90 per cent and extended single-parent was 7.80 per cent, one-person was 2.80 per cent, and single-parent nuclear was 18.80 per cent.

== Economy, health and education ==
As of 2008, the activity rate was 61.50 and economic dependency ratio was 1.11. The fraction of people working in government was 2.40 percent, individual / household private was 34.00 percent, other was 58.50 percent, para public was 0.30 percent, and private enterprise was 4.80 percent. The Grand Total as of 2008 was 566.31.

As of 2013, the coverage rate of DPT3 Children From 0 to 11 Months in the region was 78.90 percent, BGC vaccination was 87.40 and polio vaccination coverage was 75.30. As of 2007, there were 5 total tourist establishments. As of 2008, the literacy rate for people aged 15 years and over was 53.90. The net enrollment ratio of girls for secondary level was 6.60 per cent, net enrollment ratio of boys for secondary level was 7.70 per cent, and total net enrollment ratio at secondary level was 7.00 percent.

== Local Administration ==
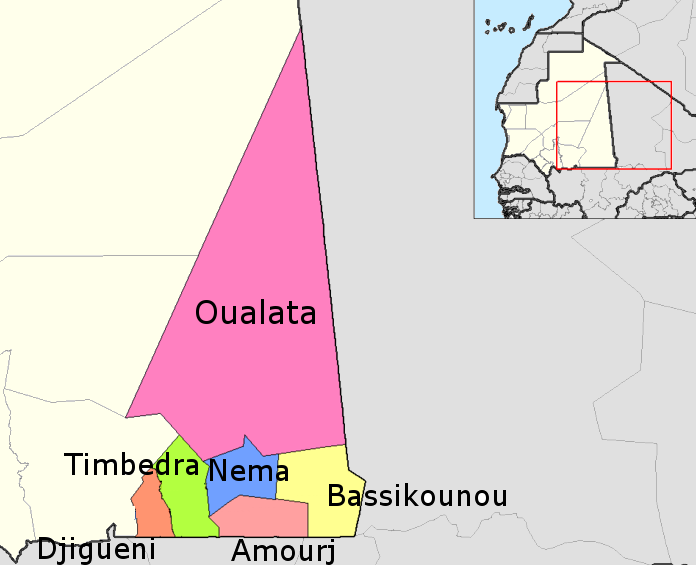
Departments of Hodh Ech Chargui

Name	Area (km^{2})	Population at Census 25 March 2013
Amourj	9,200	94,559
Bassiknou	16,500	88,432
Djiguenni	3,900	59,614
Néma	10,000	87,048
Oualata	134,000	13,086
Timbédra	9,100	79,069

The local administration is adopted from French local administration framework with a Ministry of Internal Control governing the local bodies. The original administration was held by Governors of each district, but after the municipal elections in 1994, the powers has been decentralized from the district bodies. Mauritania has been divided into 13 wilayas (regions), including the Nouakchott Capital District. The smallest administrative division in the country is the commune and the country has 216 of them. A group of communes form a moughataa (department) and the group of moughataa form a district. There are total of 53 moughataa for the 13 districts in the country. The executive power of the district is vested on a district chief, while it is on hakem for moughataa. Out of the 216 communes, 53 classified as urban and rest 163 are rural.

The communes are responsible for overseeing and coordinating development activities and are financed by the state. The Local Governments have their own legal jurisdiction, financial autonomy, an annual budget, staff, and an office. The elections for the local government are conducted every five years along with Regional and Parliamentary elections. On account of the political instability, the last elections were held in 2023.

Hodh Ech Chargui is divided into seven departments, listed below with their area and populations at the 2013 Census.

== See also ==
- Regions of Mauritania
- Departments of Mauritania
