= List of airports in Mauritania =

This is a list of airports in Mauritania, sorted by location.

== Airports ==
Airport names shown in bold indicate the airport has scheduled service on commercial airlines.

City served	ICAO	IATA	Airport name
Aioun el Atrouss	GQNA	AEO	Aioun el Atrouss Airport
Akjoujt	GQNJ	AJJ	Akjoujt Airport
Atar	GQPA	ATR	Atar International Airport
Bir Moghrein	GQPT		Bir Moghrein Airport
Boghé	GQNE	BGH	Abbaye Airport
Boutilimit	GQNB	OTL	Boutilimit Airport
Fderik	GQPF	FGD	Fderik Airport
Kaédi	GQNK	KED	Kaédi Airport
Kiffa	GQNF	KFA	Kiffa Airport
Moudjeria	GQNL	MOM	Letfotar Airport
Néma	GQNI	EMN	**Néma Airport**
Nouadhibou	GQPP	NDB	**Nouadhibou International Airport**
Nouakchott	GQNN		Nouakchott International Airport
Nouakchott	GQNO	NKC	**Nouakchott–Oumtounsy International Airport**
Sélibaby	GQNS	SEY	Sélibaby Airport
Tamchekett	GQNT	THT	Tamchakett Airport
Tichitt	GQNC	THI	Tichitt Airport
Tidjikja	GQND	TIY	Tidjikja Airport
Timbedra	GQNM		Dahara Airport
Timbedra	GQNH	TMD	Timbedra Airport
Zouérat	GQPZ	OUZ	**Tazadit Airport**

== See also ==
- Transport in Mauritania
- List of airports by ICAO code: G#GQ - Mauritania
- Wikipedia: WikiProject Aviation/Airline destination lists: Africa#Mauritania
