= Transport in Mauritania =

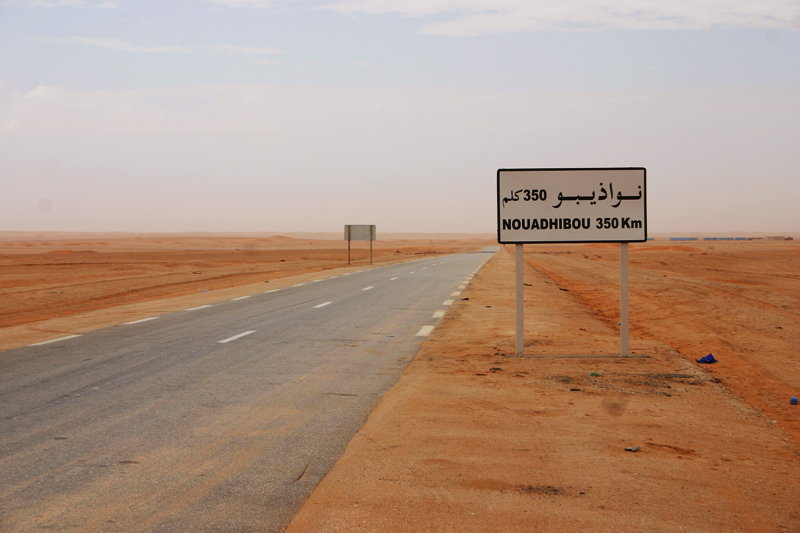
Photograph of the Cairo–Dakar Highway taken near Nouadhibou

Citizens of Mauritania have limited access to transportation. The single-line railroad serves mining interests with very occasional ad hoc passenger services. Apart from two infrastructural road developments there are few paved roads.

== Railways ==
Railways in Mauritania.

- 717 km total of single track 1,435 mm (4 ft 8 1/2 in) (standard gauge), owned and operated by a government mining company, Société Nationale Industrielle et Minière (National Mining and Industrial Company, SNIM). The railway goes from the mines at Zouérat and El Rhein, passes another mine at Fderik, and ends at the port of Nouadhibou/Cansado.
- One of the world's longest trains (up to 2.5 km long) runs here, with more than 200 wagons mainly transporting iron ore, and some carriages for passengers; alternatively, people sit on top of the iron piles.

There are no rail links with adjacent countries.

In 2008, a railway was proposed that would link Nouakchott with Tiguint, Mederdra, R'Kiz, Leguatt, Leeleibatt, Menjem Boffal, Kaedi, and Bofal.

=== Maps ===
- "Map of Sahara Occidental". sahara-occidental.com (in French).
- "General Map of Mauritania". Central Intelligence Agency. 1 Jan 1995.

=== Timeline ===
==== 2007 ====
- Sunday, August 5, 2007 - Sudan, China to Build $630 Mln Mauritania Railway.

Sudan's Danfodio Holding and China's Transtech Engineering have signed an agreement to build a 460-million-euro ($634 million) railway linking Mauritania's capital Nouakchott with southern phosphate deposits at Bofal. The 430 km (270 mi) line would run close to the southern frontier with Senegal. It is hoped that the new line would link with existing lines just across the border in Senegal, Mali. There is no through link to Burkina Faso. There are problems of choice of gauge.

==== 2008 ====
- May - 8 new EMD locomotives.

==== 2013 ====
- Proposed line for phosphate traffic - 430 km long railway line, Nouakchott and Kaedi, Mauritania's third city, through Tiguint, Mederdra, R'Kiz, Leguatt, Leeleibatt and Menjem Boffal, is to be constructed in three years' time.

==== 2014 ====
- Glencore Xstrata proposes branch lines to new mines at Askaf and Guelb El Aouj sharing infrastructure of SNIM.

== Motorway ==
There are 450 km of paved roads in Mauritania (as of 2010), connecting Nouakchott to Nouadhibou along a coastal route. A motorway linking Nouakchott to Rosso is under construction (due for completion in 2012).

== Highways ==
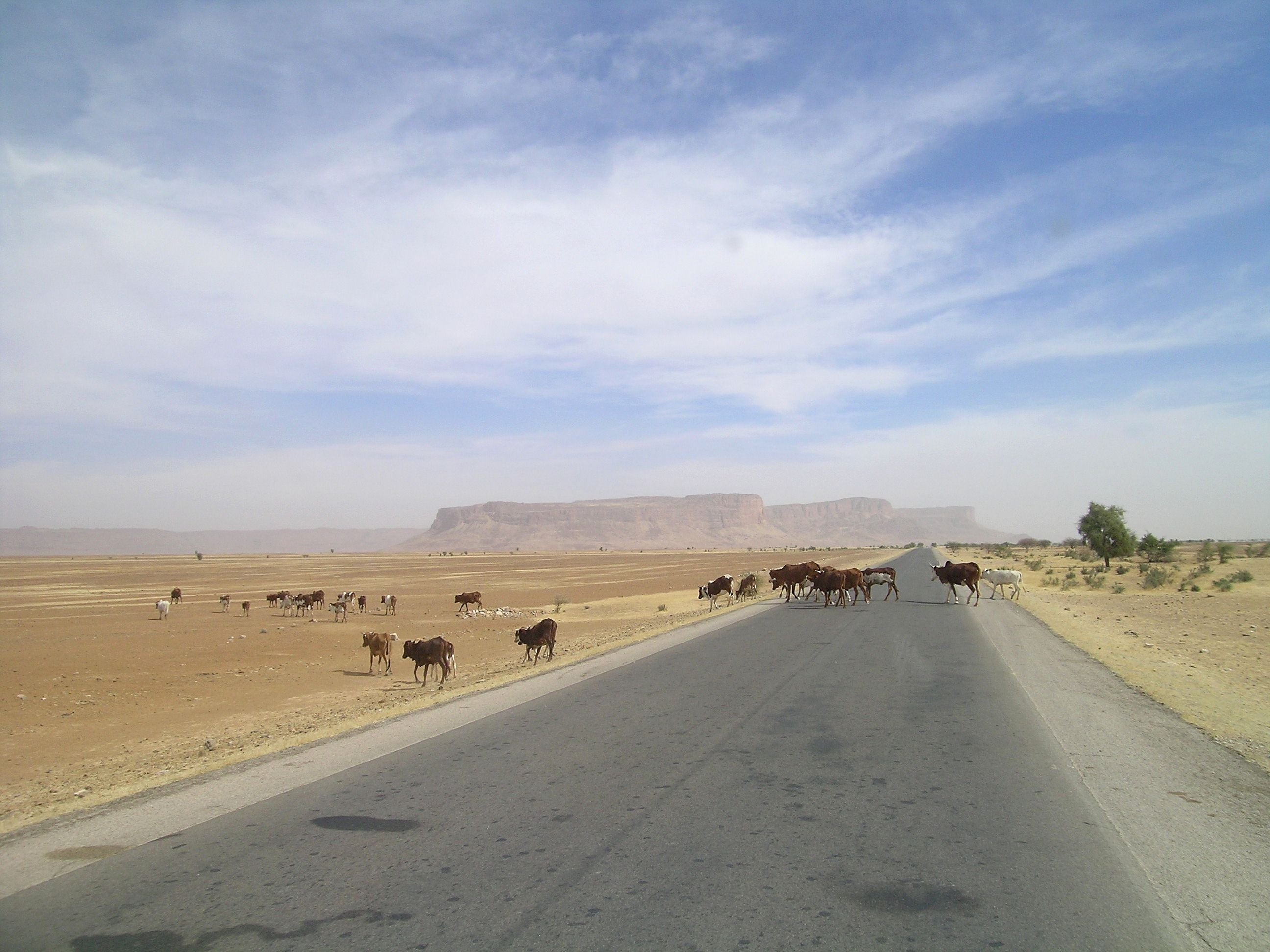
The Road of Hope in Mauritania

Mauritania has only about 3,000 km (1,900 mi) of surfaced roads, 710 km (440 mi) of unsurfaced roads, and 5,140 km (3,190 mi) of unimproved tracks.

The country's size and harsh climate make road maintenance and repair especially problematic. Overland travel is difficult and roadside assistance is almost nonexistent. Public transportation is not safe and road conditions in Mauritania are poor, particularly in the interior. Driving in Mauritania can be treacherous, and many Mauritanians drive without regard to traffic signs or rules. Roadway obstructions and hazards caused by drifting sand, animals, and poor roads often plague motorists.

=== International highways ===
The Cairo-Dakar Highway in the Trans-African Highway network passes through Mauritania, linking Nouakchott to Rabat, Tangiers, Algiers, and Tripoli. The section between the capital Nouakchott and the port of Nouadhibou was paved by 2018; only a few kilometers remain unpaved at the Moroccan border fr:Transport en Mauritanie. From Dakar there are links throughout western Africa.

The north-western end of the Trans–West African Coastal Highway is considered by the Economic Community of West African States (ECOWAS) to originate in Nouakchott.

== Waterways ==
- Mostly ferry traffic on the Senegal River.

== Ports and harbors ==
=== Atlantic Ocean ===
(from north to south)

- Nouadhibou
- Nouakchott

=== Senegal River ===
- Rosso
- Kaedi
- Bogue

== Merchant marine ==
- None as of 2002.

== Airports (paved) ==
See Airports in Mauritania

- 9 in total (2002)
- 3 are of length 2,438 to 3,047 m
- 6 are of length 1,524 to 2,437 m

By city:

- Aioun el Atrouss
- Akjoujt
- Atar International
- Bir Moghrein
- Abbaye
- Boutilimit
- Dahara Airport
- Fderik
- Kaédi
- Kiffa
- Néma
- Nouadhibou International
- Nouakchott (former airport)
- Nouakchott–Oumtounsy International
- Sélibaby
- Tamchakett
- Tichitt
- Tidjikja
- Timbedra
- Tazadit.

== Airports (unpaved) ==
See Airports in Mauritania

- 17 in total (2002)
- 2 are of length 2,438 to 3,047 m
- 5 are of length 1,524 to 2,437 m
- 7 are of length 915 to 1,523 m
- 3 are of length under 914 m

== See also ==
- Mauritania
- Longest trains
- National railway passing through foreign territory
- Mauritania Airlines
