= Air Mauritanie =

National airline of Mauritania (1962–2007)

IATA	ICAO	Call sign
MR	MRT	MIKE ROMEO
- Founded: September 1962
- Commenced operations: October 1962
- Ceased operations: 2007
- Hubs: Nouakchott International Airport
- Headquarters: Nouakchott, Mauritania
- Website: airmauritanie.mr

Air Mauritanie was the national airline of Mauritania from 1962 until it ceased operations in 2007 due to financial difficulties. It was based at Nouakchott International Airport, from where it operated domestic services, as well as flights to African destinations and Paris. The carrier had its headquarters in Nouakchott.

== History ==
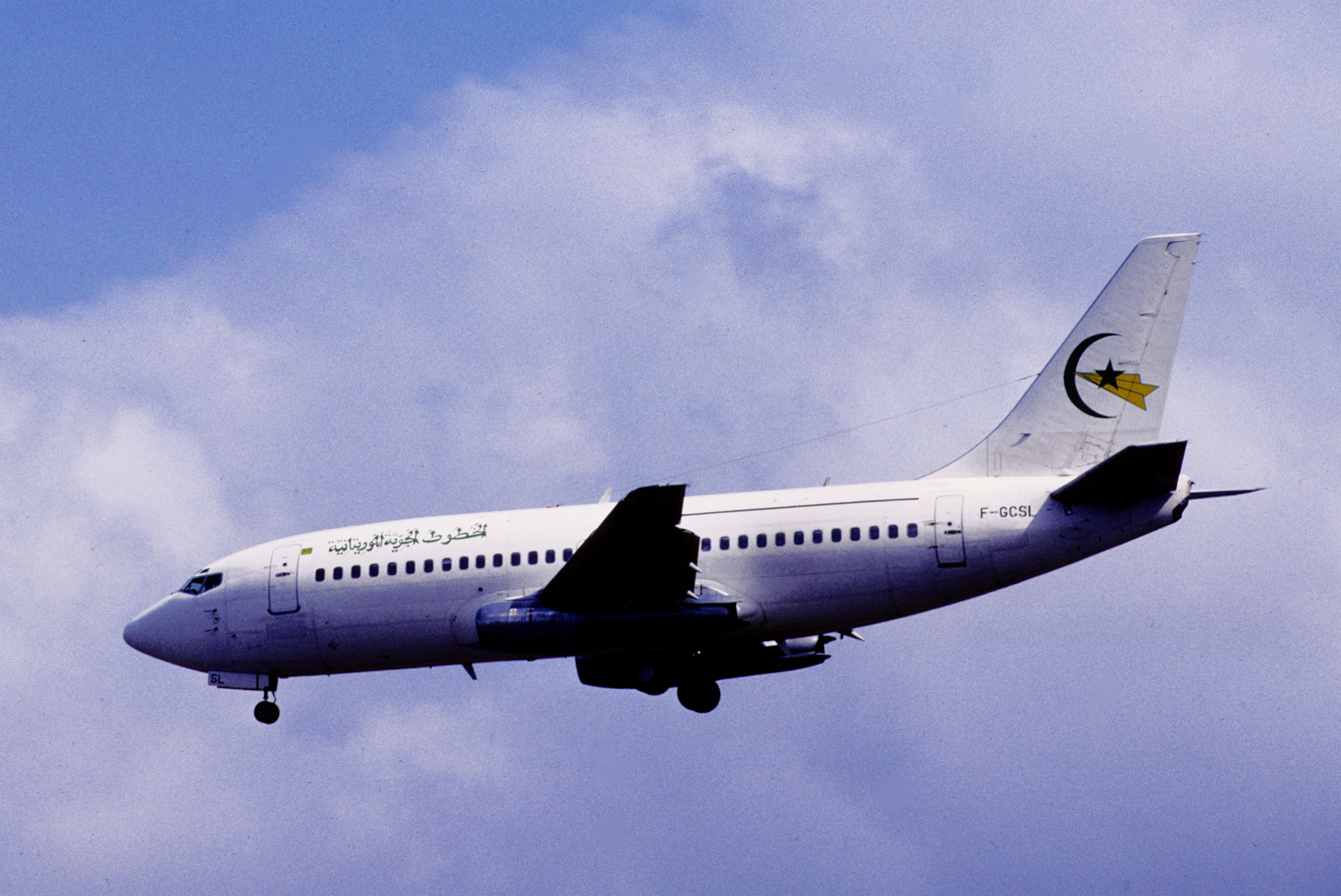
Air Mauritanie Boeing 737-200

Air Mauritanie was established in September 1962 as the national airline of the country. Operations started in October the same year, with Spantax leasing DC-3 equipment, and also providing technical assistance. A Nord 262 was ordered in 1965. The airline was reorganised in 1967, and shareholding was divided between the government of Mauritania (60%), Air Afrique (20%) and Union de Transports Aériens (UTA) (20%). Two Ilyushin Il-18s were bought in 1969, with the Soviets providing training and technical assistance; these aircraft were flown to Dakar, Nouadhibou and Las Palmas.

At March 1970, the airline had 120 employees and operated a domestic network plus international services to the Canary Islands and Mali using one DC-3, one DC-4, and an Il-18. In February 1974, a five-year contract was signed with Hughes Airwest for the provision of capacity building of the pilots and mechanics. The number of employees had grown to 170 by March the same year, with a fleet comprising one DC-3, two DC-4s and one Navajo. At this time, Casablanca, Dakar and Las Palmas were part of the airline's list of international destinations, as well as domestic services radiating from Nouakchott and Nouadhibou. That year, the carrier acquired two 40-seater F-227As valued at US$1,100,000 (equivalent to $7,181,174 in 2025) million. In July 1974, the company was reorganised again and renamed Société d'Economie Mixte Air Mauritanie. By March 1975, the government of Mauritania was the major shareholder of the company (60%), with the balance evenly split between Air Afrique and UTA.

Two Fokker F28-4000s entered the fleet in November 1983. These two aircraft made up the fleet in late March 1985; at this time, there were 259 employees. On 1 July 1994, a Fokker F28 was lost in an accident while landing at Tidjikja Airport during a sandstorm. Two ATR 42s were ordered in 1996 for replacement of the Fokker F28 aircraft. These two aircraft were delivered to the company in June and September 1996. Aimed at promoting African integration, Air Mauritanie extended its Nouakchott–Bamako route to the Ivory Coast in November 1999.

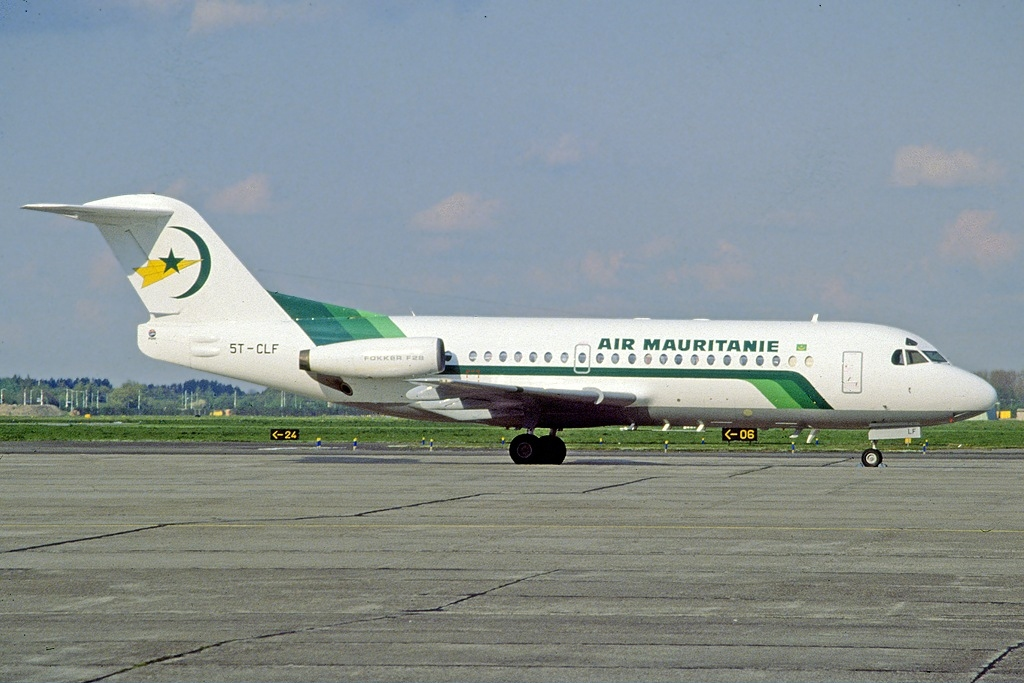
Air Mauritanie Fokker F-28 Fellowship

At April 2000, the staff stood at 259. The fleet comprised a single Fokker F28-4000 that served Abidjan, Aioun el Atrouss, Atar, Bamako, Banjul, Casablanca, Dakar, Kiffa, Las Palmas, Nema, Nouadhibou, Nouakchott, Tidjikja and Zouerate. At this time, Air Afrique had a 20% participation in the airline. In mid-2000, the Pan-African carrier boosted its shareholding in the company to 32%.

Citing security concerns, the United Kingdom banned Air Mauritanie from flying into the country airspace in January 2004. Among other carriers, Air Mauritanie was blacklisted because of the failure of the Mauritanian civil aviation authority to comply with ICAO standards. The economic situation of the carrier entered a steep decline in mid-2005, when the crisis forced the government to replace the airline's Director. It was reported in August 2006 that Royal Air Maroc would take a majority stake (51%) in the airline and to effectively take over its management; at this time, the major stockholders were the Nationale d'assurances et réassurance (40%), the Banque Mauritanienne de Commerce International, Établissements Noueigued, and Star Oil Mauritanie. However, in December 2006, the government of Mauritania created another carrier, Mauritania Airways, with the aid of private Mauritanian investors and Tunisair, which became the major shareholder (51%) of the newly created airline.

By 2007, Air Mauritanie was so indebted that in September two aircraft were seized for debts with the leasing company, the International Lease Finance Corporation, followed by the impoundment of the presidential aircraft, a Boeing 727-200. Debts for leasing these three aircraft had risen to US$2,700,000 (equivalent to $4,192,345 in 2025) million. Air Mauritanie ceased operations in September 2007 and was liquidated. Two months later, Mauritania Airways started operations.

== Destinations ==
Air Mauritanie was based at Nouakchott International Airport. The airline served the following destinations all through its history:

Country	City	Airport	Notes	Refs
Cape Verde	Praia	Praia International Airport	—	
France	Paris	Orly Airport	—	
Gambia	Banjul	Banjul International Airport	—	
Guinea-Bissau	Bissau	Osvaldo Vieira International Airport	—	
Mali	Bamako	Bamako–Sénou International Airport	—	
Mauritania	Atar	Atar International Airport	—	
Mauritania	Aioun el Atrouss	Aioun el Atrouss Airport	—	
Mauritania	Kiffa	Kiffa Airport	—	
Mauritania	Nema	Néma Airport	—	
Mauritania	Nouadhibou	Nouadhibou Airport	—	
Mauritania	Nouakchott	Nouakchott International Airport	Hub	
Mauritania	Selibaby	Sélibaby Airport	—	
Mauritania	Tidjikja	Tidjikja Airport	—	
Mauritania	Zouerate	Tazadit Airport	—	
Morocco	Casablanca	Mohammed V International Airport	—	
Senegal	Dakar	Léopold Sédar Senghor International Airport	—	
Spain	Las Palmas	Gran Canaria International Airport	—	

== Historical fleet ==
Air Mauritanie operated the following aircraft along the years:

- ATR 42
- Boeing 727-200 (VIP-configured, flown for the Mauritanian government)
- Boeing 737-700
- DC-3
- DC-4
- Fairchild F-27
- Fokker F28-4000
- Fokker F28-6000
- Il-18

== Accidents and incidents ==
As of January 2014, Air Mauritanie experienced five accidents or incidents, according to Aviation Safety Network. The only event that lead to fatalities occurred on July 1st 1994 during a landing accident. Following is the list of these events.

Date	Location	Aircraft	Tail number	Aircraft damage	Fatalities	Description	Refs
6 July 1965	(Mauritania) Nouakchott	Douglas C-47-DL	Unknown	W/O	0	Unknown	
14 March 1979	(Mauritania) Nouakchott	Fairchild F-27A	5T-CJY	W/O	0	Damaged beyond repair on landing at Nouakchott International Airport.	
1 July 1994	(Mauritania) Tidjikja	Fokker F28-4000	5T-CLF	W/O	80/93	The aircraft was completing a domestic Nouackchott–Tidjikja scheduled passenger service as Flight 625; the undercarriage failed on landing at Tidjikja Airport, causing the airframe to skid off the runway, crashing into a rock and bursting into flames.	
9 August 1996	(Mauritania) Nouakchott	Fokker F28-4000	5T-CLG	None	0	Hijacking episode.	
15 February 2007	(Spain) Las Palmas	Boeing 737-700	Unknown	None	0	The aircraft was hijacked by Mohamed Abderraman on a flight from Nouakchott to Las Palmas in the Spanish Canary Islands. The hijacker was allegedly seeking political asylum in France. Spain had identified him as a Mauritanian, while Mauritania said he was a Moroccan from the Western Sahara. The aircraft had 71 passengers and 8 crew on board. While explaining to Abderraman that the plane did not have enough fuel to reach France, the captain, Ahmedou Mohamed Lemine, discovered Abderraman did not speak French. When the Moroccan government denied the plane's request to land and refuel at Dakhla in the Western Sahara, the pilot decided to continue on to Las Palmas as planned. Afterwards the captain spoke to the first officer Satvinder Virk who was travelling as safety pilot in French, warning him that upon landing he was going to brake hard, to throw the hijacker off balance and give the crew a chance to overpower him. On landing, the captain did so, and the hijacker fell to the floor, dropping one of his pistols. First officer Virk and steward Thiam (entering first and immobilising the hijacker) poured boiling water from the coffee machine on him and beat him until they considered him sufficiently subdued. The hijacker was tied with life-jacket straps and handed over to the Guardia Civil. About twenty passengers were slightly injured when evacuating from the port aft escape slide.	

== See also ==
- Transport in Mauritania
- List of defunct airlines of Mauritania

== Bibliography ==
- Guttery, Ben R. (1998). Encyclopedia of African Airlines. Jefferson, North Carolina: Mc Farland & Company, Inc. ISBN 0-7864-0495-7.
