= Legat =

Coordinates: 16°45′0″N 14°50′0″W

Legat is a small town in southern Mauritania near the Senegal River.

== Transport ==
It is a station on a proposed railway to carry phosphate from mines near Kaedi.

== See also ==
- Legat (surname)
- Transport in Mauritania
