= Mederdra =

- Commune and town
- Location in Mauritania
- Coordinates: 16°55′N 15°39′W
- Country: Mauritania
- Region: Trarza

Area
  - Total: 101.8 sq mi (263.7 km^{2})

Population (2013)
  - Total: 7,421
  - Density: 72.89/sq mi (28.14/km^{2})
- Time zone: UTC+0 (GMT)

Mederdra (Arabic: المذرذرة) is a small town and commune in south-west Mauritania, near the border of Senegal.

In 2013, it had a population of 7,421.

== Transport ==
It lies on the route of a proposed railway line to connect phosphate mines at Kaédi with the capital and port of Nouakchott.

== Famous citizens ==
- Malouma Mint El Meidah (born 1960 in Mederdra), popular singer and politician
- Horma Ould Babana (born 1912 in Mederdra), politician
- Sidi Ould Tah (born 1964 in Mederdra), economist and 9th president of the African Development Bank

== See also ==
- Transport in Mauritania
- Railway stations in Mauritania
