= FGD =

FGD may refer to:

- Familial glucocorticoid deficiency
- Fderik Airport, in Mauritania
- Flue-gas desulfurization
- Focus group discussion
- Functional generative description, a linguistic framework
- FYVE, RhoGEF and PH domain containing
