= TIY =

TIY may refer to:

- Tidjikja Airport (IATA airport code TIY), Tagant, Mauritania
- Tin Yiu stop (MTR station code TIY), Hong Kong
