= ASC Assaba =

Assaba
- Full name: ASC Assaba
- Ground: Stade Olympique (Nouakchott); Nouakchott, Mauritania
- Capacity: 40000
- League: Mauritanean Premier League

ASC Assaba is a Mauritanian football club based in Kiffa the capital of Assaba Region. The club plays in the Mauritanean Premier League.

== Stadium ==
Currently the team plays at the 40000 capacity Stade Olympique (Nouakchott).
