= Tolani Alli =

Tolani Alli MFR (born 3 June 1992) is a documentary photographer who served in the Nigerian presidency as the Special Assistant Documentary Photography to the President of Nigeria, and personal photographer to Vice President Yemi Osinbajo. She was appointed by President Muhammadu Buhari. Before her appointment she served as Special Assistant on visual communication and the official photographer to the Governor of Oyo State, Abiola Ajimobi.

== Background and education ==
Alli was born to the family of the former Secretary to Oyo State Government, Olalekan Ismail Alli in Ibadan, Nigeria. She grew up in Lagos, Nigeria and the United States. She studied medicine in the University of Michigan. She has hinted that she left her studies in medicine to pursue her passion in photography.

== Career ==
Alli was has worked with ranking leaders and institutions over the course of her career. Her work has been featured by the CNN and Time Magazine. She's also been featured in a Netflix Documentary Series called Strong Black Lens

Alli is the first female to become an official photographer to a governor and a vice president in Nigeria. Her first public service experience was being appointed as a Special Assistant on Visual Documentation by the then Governor of Oyo State, Abiola Ajimobi. She then worked in the Nigerian Presidency as the personal photographer to the Vice President, Yemi Osinbajo. Alli is the first female photographer in Nigeria to receive the country's national honor of Member of the Federal Republic (MFR).

In 2023, Alli was appointed as the Executive Digital Storyteller to the President of the African Development Bank (AfDB), Akinwumi Adesina. She documented the activities of the bank across several countries and events such as the G7 and the COP28.

In 2025, Alli was appointed as the Creative Campaign Director of the World Bank by the President, Ajay Banga. She works alongside the institution's leadership team to document global conversations around development and bringing to spotlight issues such as poverty reduction, sustainability and equity.

In 2026, Alli launched her storytelling master class which she named "The Hatricks Masterclass". This aimed at teaching her techniques in photography and visual storytelling to attendees. The masterclass was sponsored by Payaza Africa.

== Awards and honors ==
- Member of the Federal Republic (MFR)
- National Order of Merit (NPOM)
- Future Awards Africa Prize for Photography
