= BGH =

BGH commonly refers to Bovine growth hormone.

BGH or bgh may also refer to:

== Business and organizations ==
- BGH Capital, an Australian private equity company
- Borders General Hospital, Scotland
- Bristol General Hospital, England
- Federal Court of Justice (German: Bundesgerichtshof), a German federal supreme court

== Transportation ==
- Abbaye Airport, an airport in Mauritania with the IATA code BGH
- BH Air, a Bulgarian Airline based in Sofia with the ICAO code BGH
- Brighouse railway station, a railway station in West Yorkshire, England with the National Rail station code BGH

== Other uses ==
- Bugan language (ISO 639 code bgh), China
