= Flight 625 =

Flight 625 may refer to:

- American Airlines Flight 625, crashed on 27 April 1976
- Air Mauritanie Flight 625, crashed on 1 July 1994
