= R' Kiz =

- Commune and town
- Location in Mauritania
- Coordinates: 16°55′N 15°19′W
- Country: Mauritania
- Region: Trarza

Population (2023)
  - Total: 17,871
- Time zone: UTC+0 (GMT)

R' Kiz or Rkiz is a town and urban commune in the Trarza Region of south-western Mauritania.

In 2000, it had a population of 10,688. In 2023, it had a population of 17,871.

It is located to the north of the lake of the same name.
