= Akjoujt Airport =

- IATA: AJJ; ICAO: GQNJ

Summary
- Airport type: Public
- Serves: Akjoujt
- Elevation AMSL: 403 ft / 123 m
- Coordinates: 19°43′40″N 14°22′40″W

Map
- Location of the airport in Mauritania

Runways
Direction	Length		Surface
Direction	ft	m	Surface
09/27	5,920	1,805	Asphalt
- Source: Google Maps

Akjoujt Airport (IATA: AJJ, ICAO: GQNJ) is an airport serving the town of Akjoujt in Mauritania. A second runway (03/21) is centerline marked, but has structures built on it.

== See also ==
- Transport in Mauritania
