= Tichitt Airport =

- IATA: THI; ICAO: GQNC

Summary
- Airport type: Public
- Serves: Tichit, Mauritania
- Elevation AMSL: 561 ft (171 m)
- Coordinates: 18°26′00″N 9°29′00″W

Map
- Location of the airport in Mauritania

Runways
Direction	Length		Surface
Direction	m	ft	Surface
10/28	1,570	5,151	Rock
07/25	1,350	4,429	Rock
- Source: GCM Google Maps

Tichitt Airport (IATA: THI, ICAO: GQNC) is an airport serving the town of Tichit in Mauritania. Runway boundaries are marked in white on dark rock or dirt; are otherwise difficult to discern.

== See also ==
- Transport in Mauritania
- List of airports in Mauritania
