= Bofal =

Coordinates: 16°25′00″N 13°48′00″W

Bofal is a small town in southern Mauritania. There are phosphate deposits in the vicinity. It lies near the southern border formed by the Senegal River

== Transport ==
In 2007, it was proposed to build a railway from Bofal to the coast at Nouakchott to export the phosphate. There are adjacent phosphate deposits in Senegal.

== See also ==
- Transport in Mauritania
