= Sidi Ould Tah =

Mauritanian politician

- سيدي ولد التاه
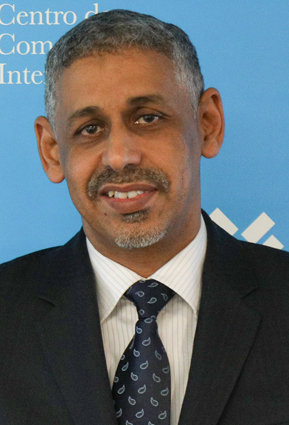

President of the African Development Bank
- Incumbent
- Assumed office 1 September 2025
- Preceded by: Akinwumi Adesina

Director General of the Arab Bank for Economic Development in Africa
- In office 1 July 2015 – April 2025

Minister of Economic Affairs and Development
- In office 31 August 2008 – 7 April 2015
- Prime Minister: Moulaye Ould Mohamed Laghdaf; Yahya Ould Hademine

Minister of Economy and Finance
- In office 15 July 2008 – 31 August 2008
- Prime Minister: Yahya Ould Ahmed El Waghef

Personal details
- Born: 31 December 1964 (age 61) Mederdra, Trarza, Mauritania
- Education: Université Nice-Sophia-Antipolis (PhD); Paris Diderot University (MASt); University of Nouakchott Al Aasriya

Sidi Ould Tah (Arabic: سيدي ولد التاه, Hassaniyya pronunciation: [siːdiː wəlː ət.taːh]) is a Mauritanian economist and development finance expert. He was elected as the ninth President of the African Development Bank (AfDB) on 29 May 2025 and assumed office on 1 September 2025.

== Early life and education ==
Ould Tah was born on December 31, 1964, in Mederdra, Mauritania. He holds a Ph.D. in Economics from the University of Nice-Sophia-Antipolis and a Diplôme d'Études Approfondies (DEA) in Economics from the University of Paris VII. He also has a post-graduate degree in Economics and a Bachelor’s degree in Economics from the University of Nouakchott.

== Career ==
Ould Tah began his professional career in 1984 at the Mauritanian Bank for Development and Commerce (BMDC), where he worked as an expert. He later worked as a financial analyst at the Food Security Commission in 1986 and as the Administration and Finance Manager for the Municipality of Nouakchott in 1987. From 1988 to 1996, he held the position of Advisor to the Director General and Director of the Internal Auditing Department at the Nouakchott Port Authority. In 1996, he joined the Arab Authority for Agriculture, Investment and Development (AAAID) in Khartoum as a financial analyst. Between 1999 and 2006, Ould Tah served as an Investment Promotion Officer and later as a Technical Assistant to the President of the Islamic Development Bank. He also held advisory roles to both the President and the Prime Minister of Mauritania from 2006 to 2008.

In July 2008, he was appointed Minister of Economy and Finance of Mauritania, a position he held until 2015. In July 2015, he was unanimously elected as the Director General of the Arab Bank for Economic Development in Africa (BADEA), a position he held until April 2025.

In May 2025, he was elected as the ninth President of the African Development Bank Group. He secured 76.18% of the total vote and 72.37% of regional votes in the third round of voting, defeating four other candidates. He succeeds Akinwumi Adesina.

== Honours ==
- Knight of the National Order of Merit of Mauritania (Mauritania, 2014)
- Officer of the National Order of Chad (Chad, 2020)
- Knight of the National Order of the Lion (Senegal, 2022)
