= Kaédi Regional Hospital =

Kaédi Regional Hospital Kaedi Regional Hospital
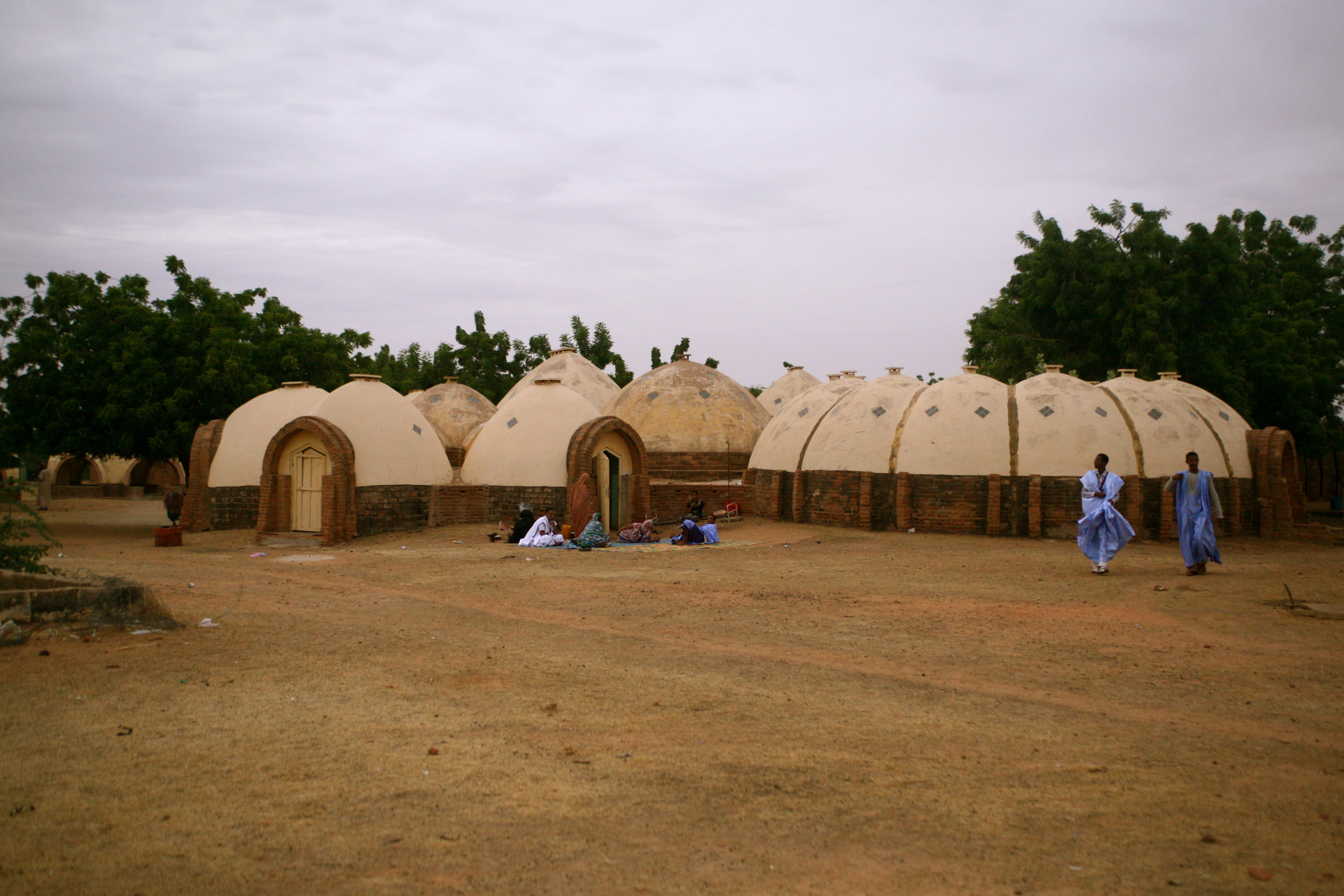
- Kaédi Regional Hospital extension. Patient families camp directly around in-patients rooms.

Geography
- Location: Kaédi, Gorgol Region, Mauritania
- Coordinates: 16°09′02″N 13°30′24″W

Organisation
- Type: General

History
- Founded: 1992

Links
- Lists: Hospitals in Mauritania

The Kaedi Regional Hospital is the largest health facility in Kaédi, in the Gorgol Region in southern Mauritania, and one known for its innovative architecture.

The hospital involves the use of hand fired locally made brick and a design based on a sequence of simple and complex dome structures. The structure was intended to be both to be naturally cool even while letting in significant light from the outdoors.

The hospital was designed by the Italian architect Fabrizio Carola of the Association for the Development of Traditional African Urbanism and Architecture (ADAUA). ADAUA used the design and construction project to develop and disseminate both a new "urban vernacular" architecture for the region and to train workers in new, low-cost and locally appropriate techniques in construction. Workmen were trained on site in the new techniques.

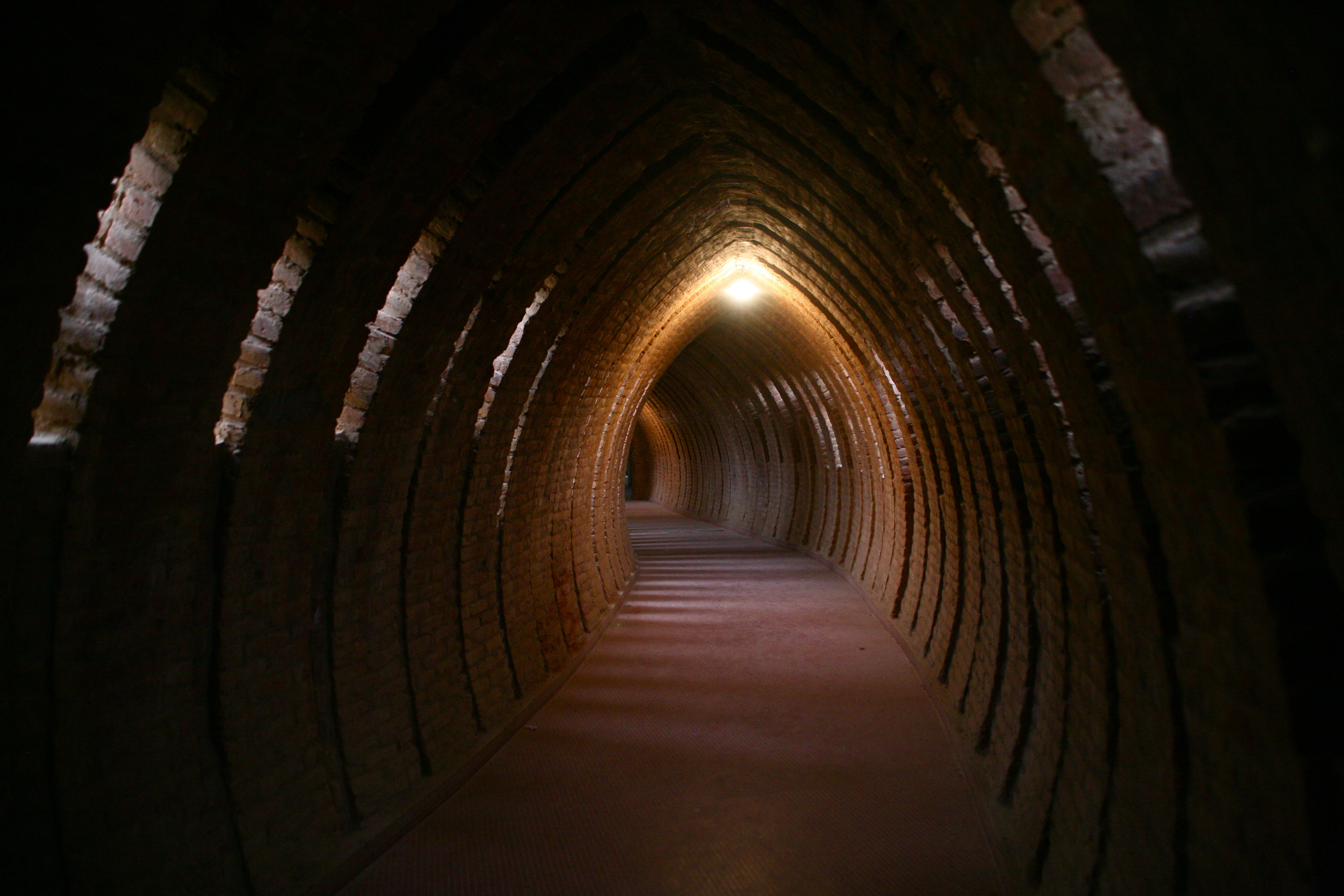
Corridor of the hospital extension, featuring openings for cross-through ventilation

The hospital won the Aga Khan Award for Architecture in 1995.
