= Ould Yenge (department) =

- Department
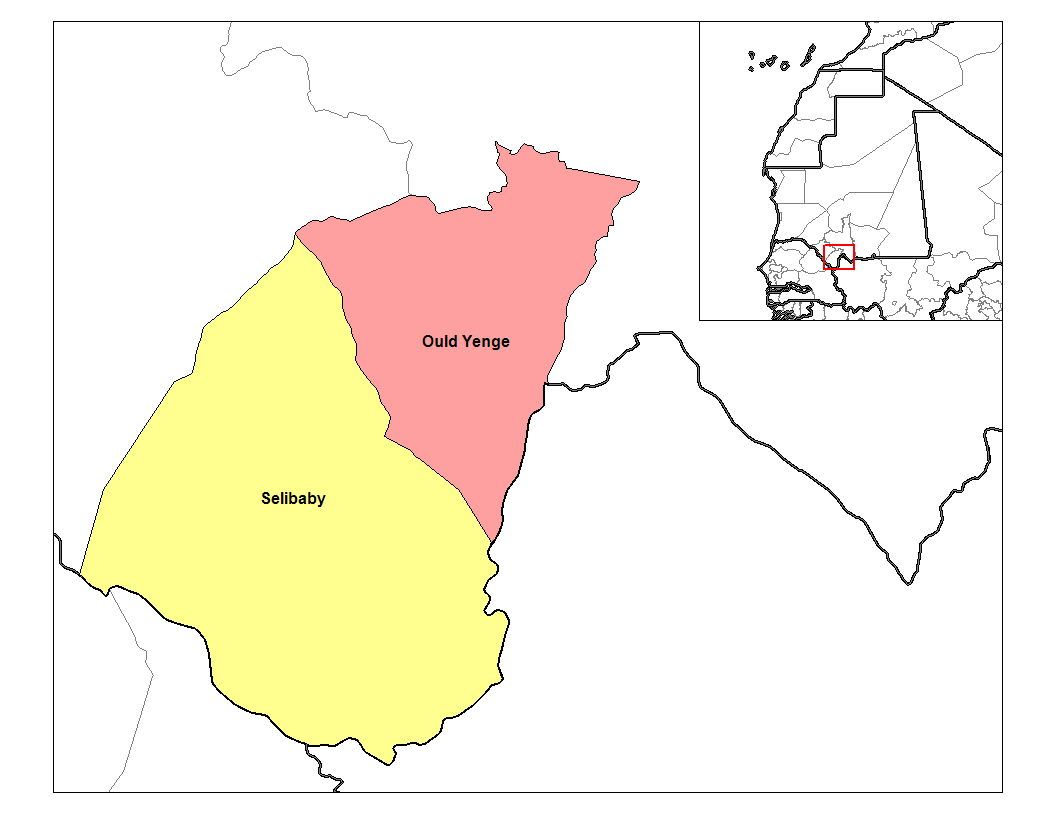

- Location within Mauritania
- Country: Mauritania

Area
  - Total: 3,550 km^{2} (1,370 sq mi)

Population (2013 census)
  - Total: 68,341
  - Density: 19.3/km^{2} (49.9/sq mi)

Ould Yenge is a department in southern Mauritania of southern Mauritania, located in the region of Guidimakha. It is situated on the edge of Karakoro, a tributary of the Senegal River that marks the border with Mali.

It is the department with the best watering of the country sometimes recording more than 600 mm / year which makes it one of the main agro-pastoral zones of Mauritania, maintaining important exchanges with the neighbor Malian. Its relief is distinguished by the volume of tributaries, the number of wadis, the level of mountains and the diversity of its fauna and flora.

The moughataa is also distinguished by the multiplicity of its tourist sites: its authentic urban centers (N'Jew), and the beauty of nature (The Karakoro, Lemssila, Tektaka, N'doumeily, Takhada, Laweinatt, Lekleybiya).
