= Lake R'Kiz =

Lake in Mauritania

R'Kiz
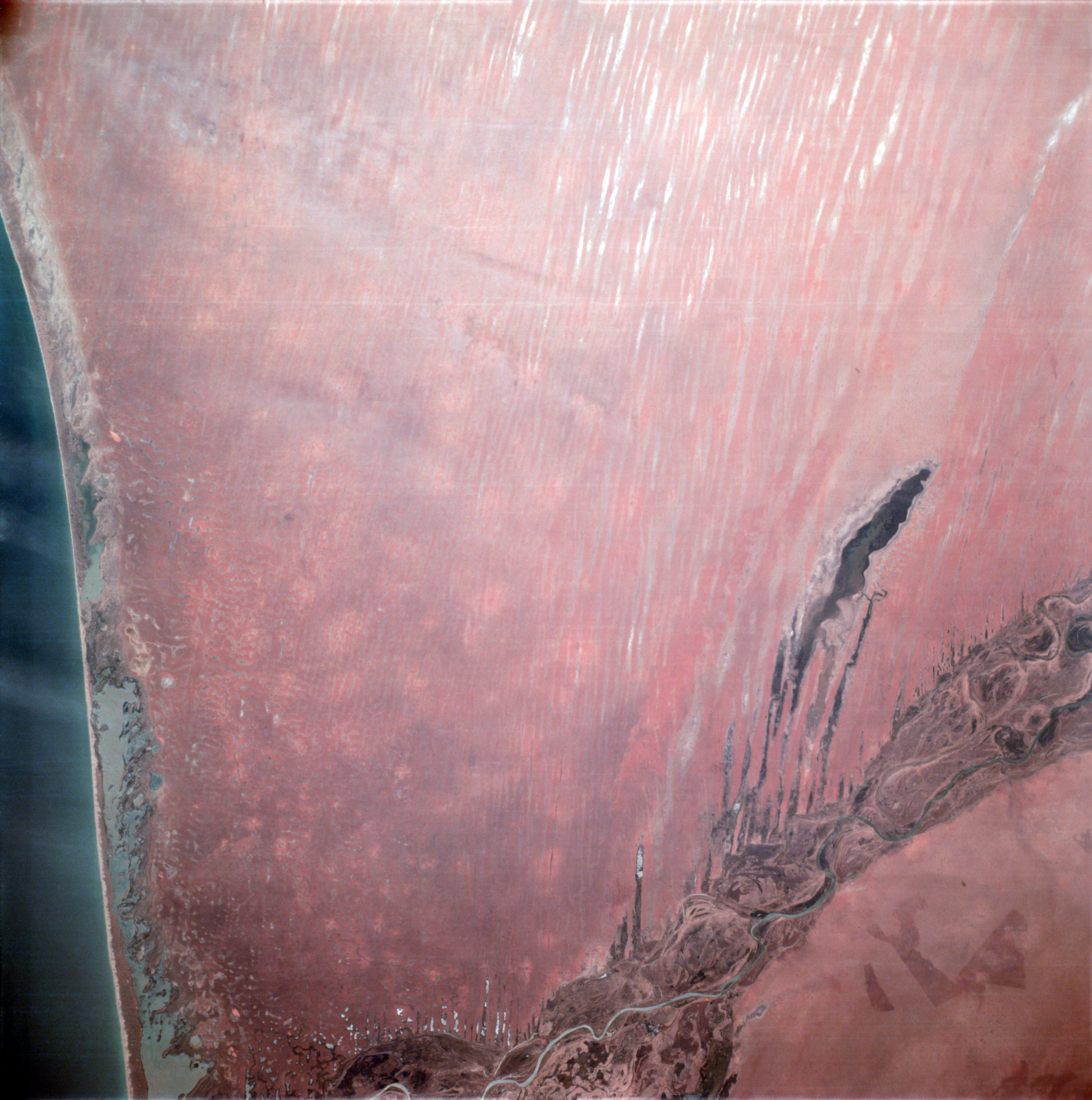
- Photo taken by Apollo 6.

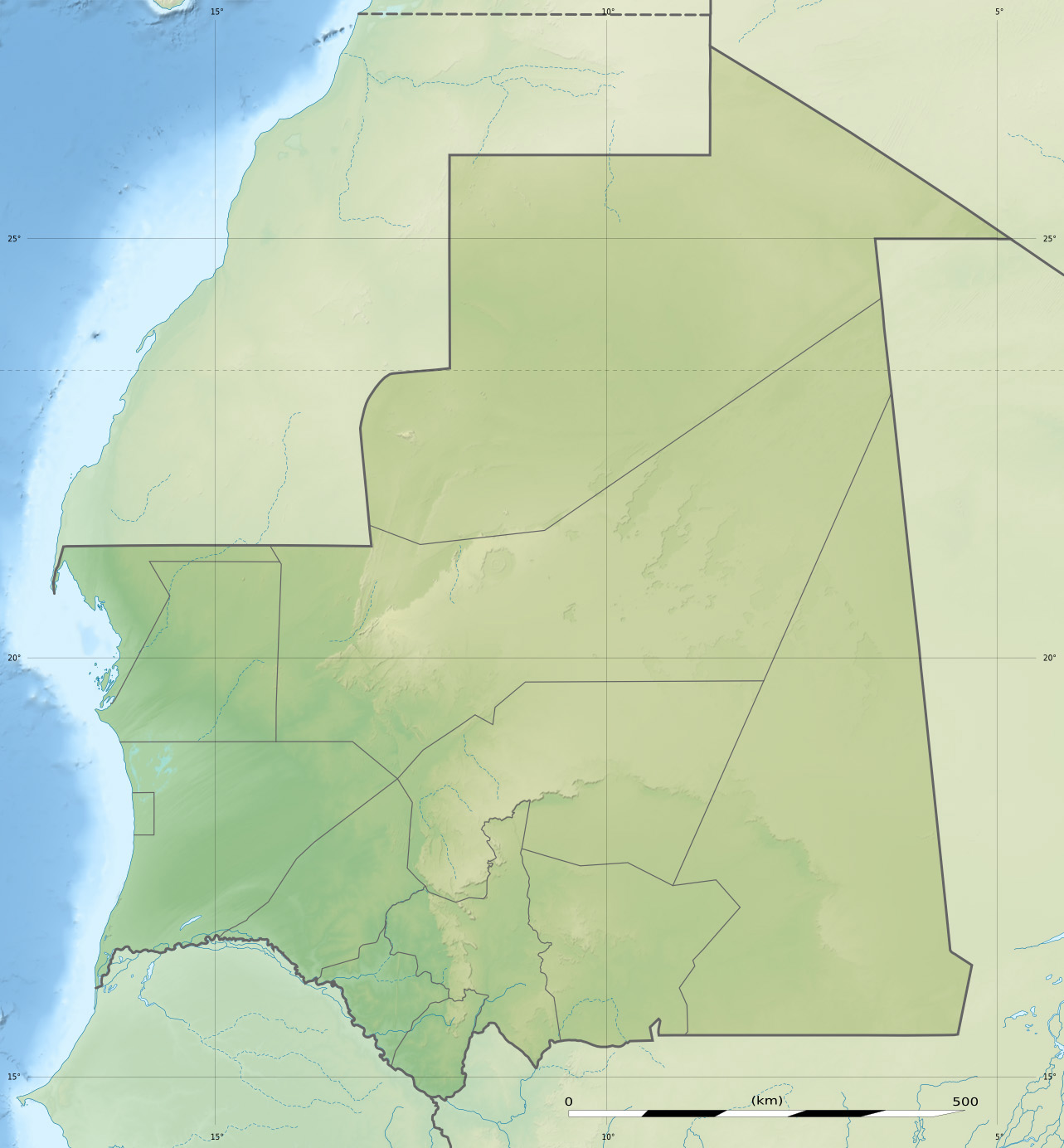
- Location in Mauritania
- Location: Mauritania
- Coordinates: 16°52′N 15°17′W
- Type: Ephemeral Lake
- Primary inflows: Senegal River
- Primary outflows: Senegal River
- Max. width: 5 km (3.1 mi)
- Surface area: 12,970 ha (32,000 acres)
- Average depth: 1.44 m (4 ft 9 in)
- Max. depth: 3.35 m (11.0 ft)
- Surface elevation: 1 m (3 ft 3 in)
- Settlements: R'Kiz

Lake R'Kiz or Rkiz, historically known as Lake Cayor or Cayar, is a lake in southern Mauritania with an area of 12,970 ha.

== History ==
In November 1087, a battle took place between the Serer leader, Amar Godomat and the leader of the Almoravid, Abu Bakr ibn Umar, where the latter was defeated and killed.

== Ecology ==
Since the lake is fed by surplus water from the Senegal River, during the rainy season it can increase to a maximum length of 34 km and a width of up to 8 km, while the water level can fluctuate by as much as 4.29 m.

In the marshland along its fringes, Phragmites and Typha reeds are growing, which are cut for thatching. Several species of snakes, and small mammals such as otters and mongooses, are present. Slender-snouted crocodiles can also be found. The lake has been designated an Important Bird Area (IBA) by BirdLife International because it supports significant populations of non-breeding western swamphens, as well as wintering garganeys and northern pintails.

== Economy ==
The lake has been used for fishing, but agriculture is also prevalent.

Although the region has seen several agriculture projects aimed at benefiting farmers both by the Islamic Development Bank and The Food Crisis Prevention Network, like elsewhere in Mauritania, as of 2017 significant portions of the local population continued to suffer from living conditions comparable to modern slavery.
