= Abbaye Airport =

Abbaye Airport Boghé Abbaye
- IATA: BGH; ICAO: GQNE

Summary
- Airport type: Public
- Serves: Boghé
- Elevation AMSL: 66 ft / 20 m
- Coordinates: 16°38′10″N 14°11′25″W

Map
- Location of the airport in Mauritania

Runways
Direction	Length		Surface
Direction	ft	m	Surface
02/20	4,000	1,220	Dirt
- Source: Google Maps

Abbaye Airport (IATA: BGH, ICAO: GQNE) is an airport serving the town of Boghé in Mauritania.

== See also ==
- Transport in Mauritania
