= Sélibaby Airport =

- IATA: SEY; ICAO: GQNS

Summary
- Airport type: Public
- Operator: Government
- Serves: Sélibaby, Mauritania
- Elevation AMSL: 262 ft (80 m)
- Coordinates: 15°10′46″N 012°12′26″W

Map
- Location of airport in Mauritania

Runways
| Direction | Length | | Surface |
| Direction | m | ft | Surface |
|---|---|---|---|
| 07/25 | 1,600 | 5,249 | Macadam |
- Source: DAFIF

Sélibaby Airport (IATA: SEY, ICAO: GQNS) is an airport serving Sélibaby, a town in the Guidimaka region of southern Mauritania.
