= Guidimaka region =

Region of Mauritania

Guidimakha ولاية كيدي ماغة
- Region
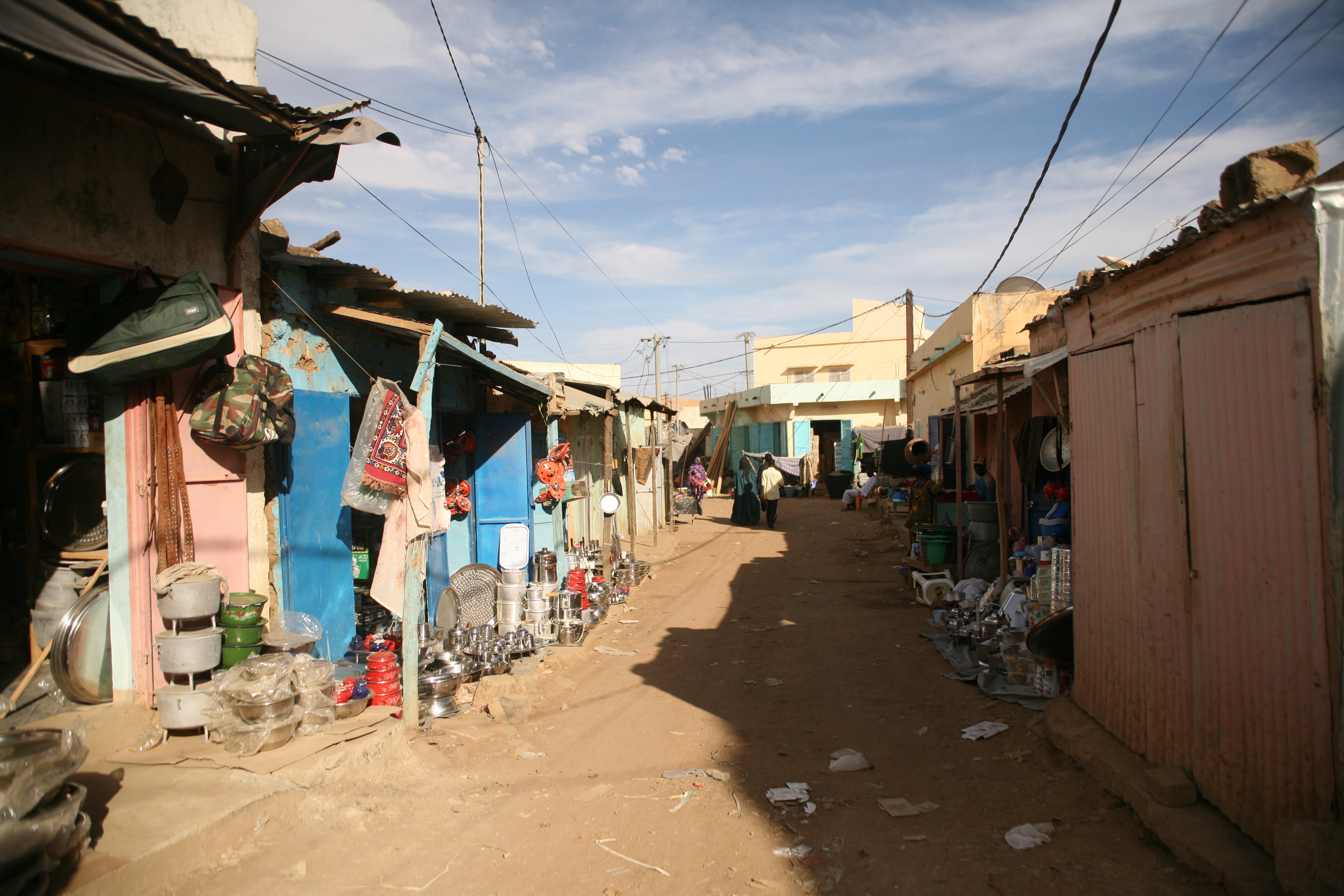
- A street in Sélibaby

- Coordinates: 15°23′N 12°21′W
- Country: Mauritania
- Departments: 4: Ould Yenge; Sélibaby; Wompou; Khabou
- Capital: Sélibaby

Area
  - Total: 10,300 km^{2} (4,000 sq mi)

Population (2023 census)
  - Total: 363,075
  - Density: 35.3/km^{2} (91.3/sq mi)
- Time zone: UTC+0
  - Summer (DST): not observed
- HDI (2017): 0.454 low

Guidimaka (Arabic: ولاية كيدي ماغة, romanized: Wilāyat Kidi Māghah) is the southernmost region of Mauritania. Its capital is Sélibaby. The region borders the Mauritanian region of Assaba to the north-east, Mali to the south-east, Senegal to the south-west and the Mauritanian Gorgol Region to the west. It is named after the historical Soninke state of Guidimakha.

== Geography ==
Mauritania is mostly covered with desert, with only its western regions around the coast of Atlantic Ocean having some vegetation. There are some oasis in the desert regions. Since it is a desert, there are large shifting dunes forming temporary ranges. The average elevation is around 460 m (1,510 ft) above the mean sea level. The rainfall in the northern regions closer to the Tropic of Cancer receives around 100 mm (3.9 in) of annual rainfall compared to the southern portions that receives around 660 mm (26 in). The average temperature is 37.8 °C (100.0 °F), while during the night it reaches 0 °C (32 °F).

Due to the geography, the inhabitants have historically been nomadic. In modern times, people have migrated to urban centres during the drought in the 1970s and the early 1980s. There are a few sedentary cultivators, who are located only in the Southern regions of the country. Research has indicated that the Saharan movement has resulted in reduction of rains in the region from the 1960s, when it received close to 250 mm (9.8 in) of rainfall.

== Demographics ==
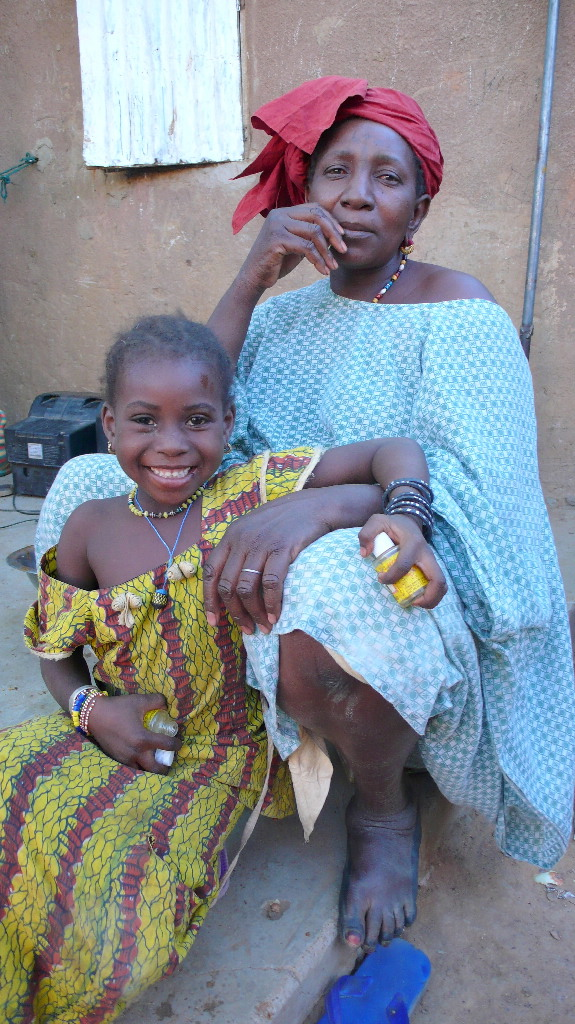
A lady in the region

Historical population
Year	Pop.	±% p.a.
1977	83,231	—
1988	116,436	+3.10%
2000	177,707	+3.59%
2013	267,029	+3.18%
2023	363,075	+3.12%

As of 2013, the population of the region was 267,029, compared to 260,459 in 2011. There were 48.88 per cent females and 51.12 per cent males. As of 2008, the couples with children were 40.60 and Couples without children was 7.20. The proportion with extended family was 23.00 per cent and extended single-parent was 5.50 per cent, one-person was 4.40 per cent, and single-parent nuclear was 19.30 per cent.

As of 2008, the rate of household confirming the existence of public telephone in their neighbourhood or village was 73.71, rate of households benefiting from electricity post in their neighbourhood was 0.75 per cent, rate of households benefiting from health center or health post in their neighbourhood was 8.61 per cent, and rate of households benefiting from sanitary services was 0.16 per cent.

== Economy, health and education ==
As of 2008, the activity rate was 40.70 and economic dependency ratio was 1.22. The fraction of people working in government was 2.50 per cent, individual / household private was 20.50 per cent, other was 74.80 per cent, para public was 0.30 per cent, and private enterprise was 2.00 per cent. The Grand Total as of 2008 was 509.62. As of 2013, the coverage rate of DPT3 Children From 0 to 11 Months in the region was 82.10 per cent, BGC vaccination was 75.80 and polio vaccination coverage was 80.40. As of 2007, the number of tourist establishments in the region was 1. As of 2008, the literacy rate for people aged 15 years and over was 27.30. The net enrolment ratio of girls for secondary level was 2.90 per cent, net enrolment ratio of boys for secondary level was 8.90 per cent, and Total net enrolment ratio at secondary level was 6.10 per cent.

== Local administration ==
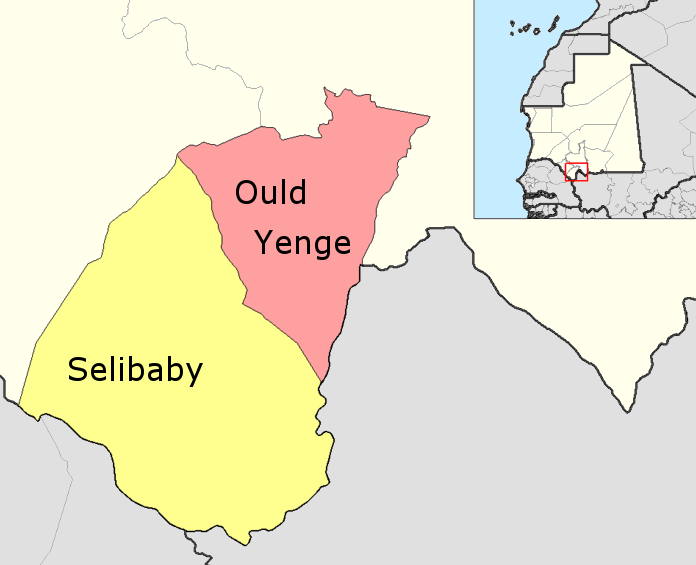
Departments of Guidimaka.

The local administration is adopted from French local administration framework with a Ministry of Internal Control governing the local bodies. The original administration was held by Governors of each district, but after the municipal elections in 1994, the powers has been decentralized from the district bodies. Mauritania has been divided into 13 wilayas (regions), including the Nouakchott Capital District. The smallest administrative division in the country is the commune and the country has 216 of them. A group of communes form a moughataa (department) and the group of moughataa form a district. There are total of 53 moughataa for the 13 districts in the country. The executive power of the district is vested on a district chief, while it is on hakem for moughataa. Out of the 216 communes, 53 classified as urban and rest 163 are rural.

The communes are responsible for overseeing and coordinating development activities and are financed by the state. The Local Governments have their own legal jurisdiction, financial autonomy, an annual budget, staff, and an office. The elections for the local government are conducted every five years along with Regional and Parliamentary elections. On account of the political instability, the last elections were held in 2023.

Guidimaka is divided into two departments, namely, Ould Yenge and Selibaby.

== See also ==
- Regions of Mauritania
- Departments of Mauritania
