= Legat (surname) =

Legat is a surname, and may refer to:

- Arthur Legat (1898–1960), Belgian racing driver
- Francis Legat (1755–1809), Scottish engraver
- Michael Legat (1923–2011), British writer
- Nadine Nicolaeva-Legat, Russian prima ballerina
- Nikolai Legat (1869–1937), Russian ballet dancer
- Sergei Legat (1875–1905), Russian ballet dancer
- Thorsten Legat (born 1968), German footballer
