= Boghé =

Boghé بوغي
- Commune and town
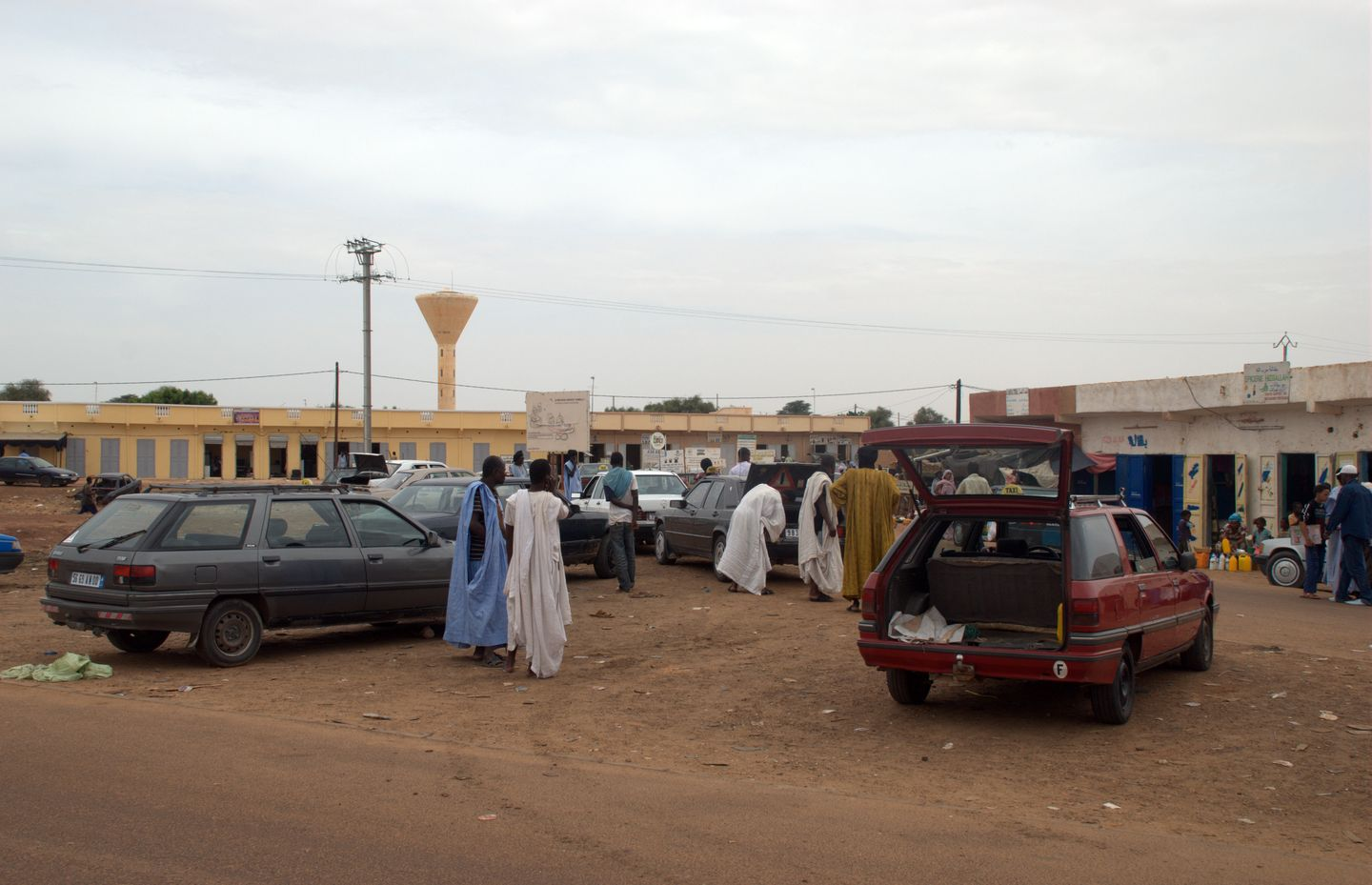

- Location in Mauritania
- Coordinates: 16°35′N 14°16′W
- Country: Mauritania
- Region: Brakna
- Department: Bogué (department)
- Elevation: 13 m (43 ft)

Population (2023 census)
  - Total: 50,205
- Time zone: UTC+0 (GMT)

Boghé (also Bogué) is a town and commune in the Brakna Region of southern Mauritania, located on the border with Senegal.

In 2013, it had a census population of 40,341. In 2023, it had a census population of 50,205.

The city has a high school but no university. Efforts are under way to build a hospital to serve the city and its region.

== Climate ==
In Boghé, the climate is characterized as warm and temperate with minimal rainfall. According to the Köppen-Geiger climate classification, it falls under the BSh category. The average yearly temperature in Boghé is 29.0 °C (84.2 °F), and the area receives approximately 244 mm (9.61 in) of precipitation annually.

Climate data for Boghe
Month	Jan	Feb	Mar	Apr	May	Jun	Jul	Aug	Sep	Oct	Nov	Dec	Year
Mean daily maximum °C (°F)	31.4 (88.5)	33.6 (92.5)	36.3 (97.3)	39.0 (102.2)	40.7 (105.3)	40.8 (105.4)	38.2 (100.8)	36.5 (97.7)	37.3 (99.1)	38.3 (100.9)	36.0 (96.8)	31.3 (88.3)	36.6 (97.9)
Mean daily minimum °C (°F)	14.5 (58.1)	16.2 (61.2)	19.6 (67.3)	21.6 (70.9)	24.1 (75.4)	25.4 (77.7)	25.7 (78.3)	25.9 (78.6)	25.7 (78.3)	23.3 (73.9)	19.6 (67.3)	16.0 (60.8)	21.5 (70.6)
Average precipitation mm (inches)	1 (0.0)	1 (0.0)	0 (0)	0 (0)	0 (0)	11 (0.4)	56 (2.2)	91 (3.6)	68 (2.7)	16 (0.6)	0 (0)	0 (0)	244 (9.6)
Source: Climate-Data.org, Climate data
