= Kaédi Airport =

- IATA: KED; ICAO: GQNK

Summary
- Airport type: Public
- Operator: Government
- Serves: Kaédi, Mauritania
- Elevation AMSL: 75 ft (23 m)
- Coordinates: 16°09′34″N 013°30′27″W

Map
- Location within Mauritania

Runways
Direction	Length		Surface
Direction	m	ft	Surface
07/25	2,500	8,202	Asphalt
- Source: DAFIF

Kaédi Airport (IATA: KED, ICAO: GQNK) is an airport serving Kaédi, a city in the Gorgol Region of southern Mauritania.
