= Air Mauritanie Flight 625 =

1994 aviation accident

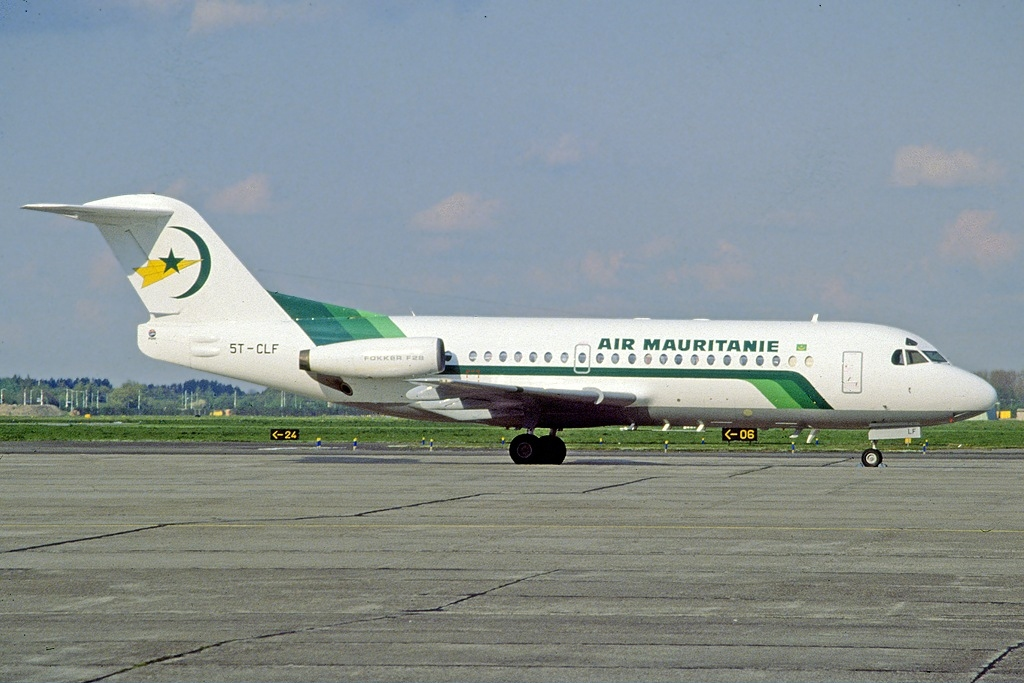
- 5T-CLF, the aircraft involved in the accident, photographed in April 1991

Accident
- Date: 1 July 1994
- Summary: Runway excursion, aggravated by sandstorm
- Site: Tidjikja Airport, Mauritania

Aircraft
- Aircraft type: Fokker F28 Fellowship
- Operator: Air Mauritanie
- IATA flight No.: MR625
- ICAO flight No.: MRT625
- Call sign: MIKE ROMEO 625
- Registration: 5T-CLF
- Flight origin: Nouakchott International Airport, Mauritania
- Destination: Tidjikja Airport, Mauritania
- Occupants: 93
- Passengers: 89
- Crew: 4
- Fatalities: 80
- Survivors: 13

Air Mauritanie Flight 625 was a Fokker F28 Fellowship 4000 which crashed on landing at Tidjikja Airport, Mauritania on 1 July 1994 in sandstorm conditions. All four crew and 76 of the 89 passengers were killed in the crash. It remains the deadliest crash involving a Fokker 28 and the deadliest one in Mauritania.

== Accident ==
Nationality	Crew	Passengers	Total
Mauritania	4	0	4
Mauritania/France	0	89	89
Total	4	89	93

The aircraft was flying from Nouakchott to Tidjikja. On board were 89 Mauritanian-French nationals returning to see their family and 4 crew members. The landing was performed in a sandstorm. The F28 had made several approaches to the airport before making a heavy landing, which caused the front undercarriage to collapse and the aircraft to slide off the runway, crash into a rocky outcrop and burst into flames. Only 13 passengers survived, all seriously injured, while all four crew members and the remaining 76 passengers died. The crash was the second involving a Fokker aircraft in West Africa in less than a week following the crash of Air Ivoire Flight 777 on 26 June. It also remains the deadliest aviation accident in Mauritania.

== Aftermath ==
In the initial aftermath, the Mauritanian News Agency (AMP) said that the exact number of casualties was not directly known.

Fokker announced that its team of experts would be kept available for an investigation should the Mauritanian authorities request one.

According to zahraainfo.com, Mauritanian radio stations refused to cover or broadcast news about the crash with authorities refusing to declare a period of mourning, in addition to no follow up being provided by the Mauritanian Ministry of Transport. The airport reportedly lacked "the most basic" air safety requirements.
