= Boutilimit Airport =

- IATA: OTL; ICAO: GQNB

Summary
- Airport type: Public
- Serves: Boutilimit
- Elevation AMSL: 121 ft / 37 m
- Coordinates: 17°32′10″N 14°40′10″W

Map
- Location of the airport in Mauritania

Runways
Direction	Length		Surface
Direction	ft	m	Surface
16/34	7,550 (approx)	2,300 (approx)	Asphalt
- Source: Google Maps

Boutilimit Airport (IATA: OTL, ICAO: GQNB) is an airport serving the town of Boutilimit in Mauritania.

In 2015, construction was started on an approximately 2,300 metres (7,500 ft) paved runway to replace the old sand runway that was being encroached upon by the town.

== See also ==
- Transport in Mauritania
