= Akinwumi Adesina =

Nigerian economist (born 1960)

Akinwumi Adesina CON CGH
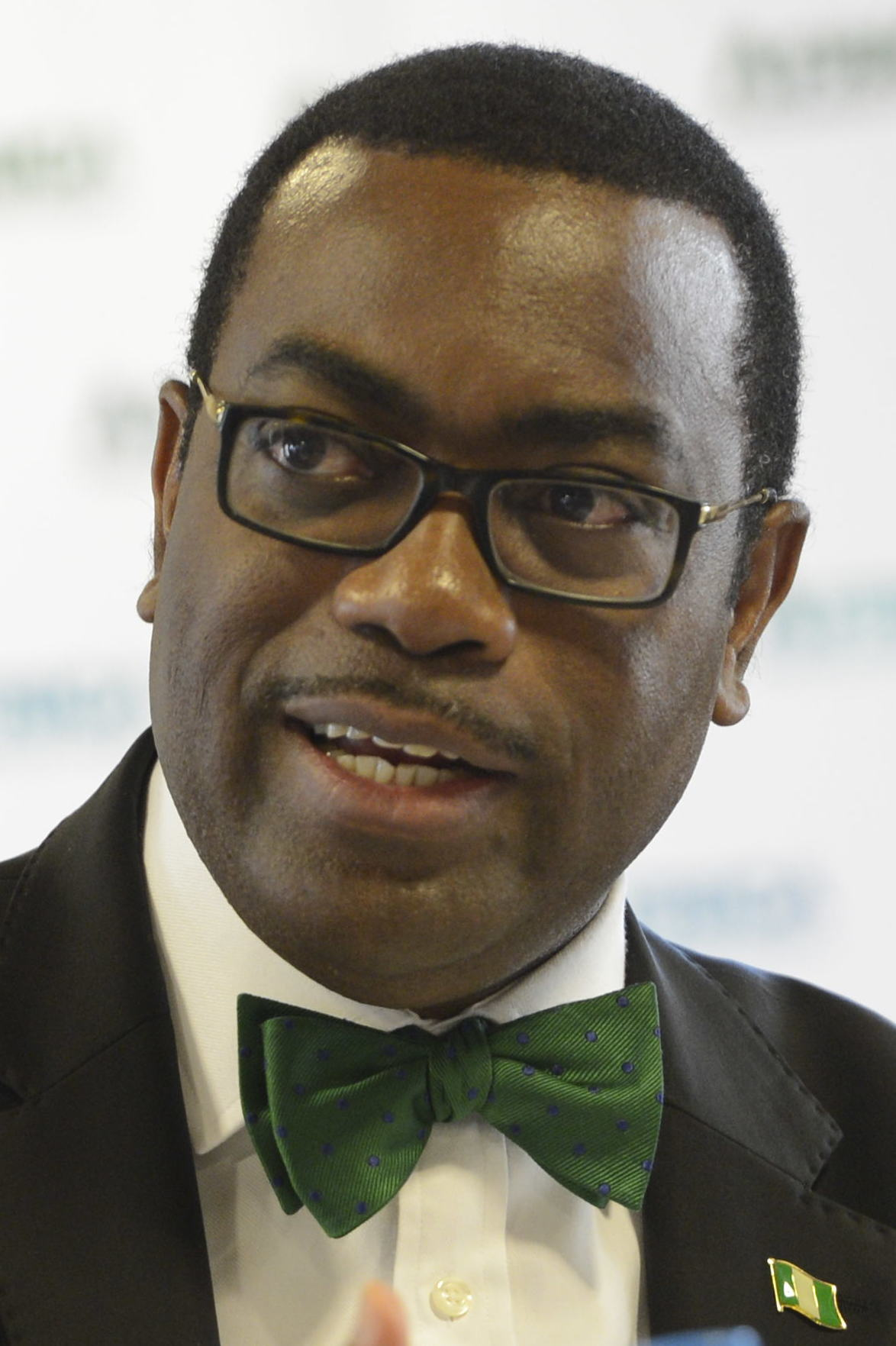
- Adesina in 2014

8th President of the African Development Bank
- In office 1 September 2015 – 1 September 2025
- Preceded by: Donald Kaberuka
- Succeeded by: Sidi Ould Tah

Minister of Agriculture and Rural Development
- In office 2010–2015
- President: Goodluck Jonathan
- Preceded by: Abba Sayyadi Ruma
- Succeeded by: Audu Ogbeh

Personal details
- Born: 6 February 1960 (age 66) Nigeria
- Education: University of Ife; Purdue University (PhD)

Akinwumi Adesina CON CGH (born 6 February 1960) is a Nigerian economist who served as the President of the African Development Bank from 2015 to 2025. He previously served as Nigeria's Minister of Agriculture and Rural Development. Until his appointment as Minister in 2010, he was Vice President of Policy and Partnerships for the Alliance for a Green Revolution in Africa (AGRA). He was elected as the President of the African Development Bank in 2015 and re-elected for a second term in 2020. He is the first Nigerian to hold the position.

== Early life and education ==
Adesina was born to a Nigerian farmer in Ibadan, Oyo state. He spent part of his childhood in rural communities, an experience that later influenced his interest in agricultural economics and rural development. He attended Ejigbo Baptist High School (EBHS) and had a bachelor's degree in Agricultural Economics with First Class Honors from the University of Ife (now Obafemi Awolowo University), Nigeria, in 1981. He was the first student to be awarded this distinction by the university. He pursued further studies at Purdue University, Indiana, and briefly returned to Nigeria in 1984, to get married. He obtained his Ph.D. in Agricultural Economics in 1988 from Purdue, where he won the outstanding Ph.D. thesis for his research work.

== Career ==
From 1990 to 1995, Adesina served as a senior economist at West African Rice Development Association (WARDA) in Bouaké, Ivory Coast. He worked at the Rockefeller Foundation since winning a fellowship from the foundation as a senior scientist in 1988. From 1999 to 2003, he was the representative of the Foundation for the Southern African area. From 2003 to 2008, he was an associate director for food security.

Adesina was the Nigerian Agriculture Minister from 2010 to 2015. As Minister of Agriculture and Rural Development, Adesina introduced reforms aimed at reducing corruption in agricultural input distribution and increasing farmers' access to subsidised farm inputs through an electronic-wallet system. The initiative was designed to deliver agricultural subsidies directly to farmers and reduce reliance on intermediaries. Adesina was named Forbes African Man of the Year, for his reform of Nigerian agriculture. He introduced more transparency into the fertiliser supply chain. He also said that he would give away mobile phones to farmers, but this proved too difficult. One of the reasons was lack of a mobile network in country areas.

In 2010, United Nations Secretary General, Ban Ki-moon, appointed him as one of 17 global leaders, to spearhead the Millennium Development Goals. Adesina received the 2010 Borlaug CAST Communication Award from the Council for Agricultural Science and Technology (CAST), the year that the award was renamed after agricultural biologist and 1970 Nobel Peace Prize winner Norman Borlaug.

On 28 May 2015, Adesina was elected the presumptive President of the African Development Bank. He began his tenure of the office on 1 September 2015.

In September 2016, Adesina was appointed by United Nations Secretary-General, Ban Ki-moon, to serve as member of the Lead Group of the Scaling Up Nutrition Movement. In 2017, he was awarded 2017 World Food Prize.

On 27 August 2020, Adesina was re-elected as President of the Africa Development Bank for a second term of five years.

In March 2024, the 2023 Obafemi Awolowo Leadership Award was officially presented to Akinwumi Adesina, during a ceremony held on 6 March at the Continental Hotel in Lagos.

In May 2025, former Mauritanian finance minister Sidi Ould Tah was elected to replace Adesina after the end of his second term in September 2025.

=== Presidency of the African Development Bank ===
Adesina was elected President of the African Development Bank in May 2015 and assumed office on 1 September 2015. During his tenure, the Bank pursued the "High 5" development agenda: Light Up and Power Africa, Feed Africa, Industrialise Africa, Integrate Africa, and Improve the Quality of Life for the People of Africa.

He was unanimously re-elected for a second five-year term in August 2020.

== Personal life ==
While at Purdue University, Adesina and his wife, along with another couple, started a Christian group called the African Student Fellowship.

== Legacy ==
Adesina is widely regarded as one of Africa's leading development economists and agricultural reformers. His work in agricultural policy, food security, rural finance, and development banking has influenced economic development strategies across the continent.

During his presidency of the African Development Bank, the institution expanded its development financing activities and pursued its strategic "High 5" priorities, which focused on energy access, agricultural transformation, industrialisation, regional integration, and improving quality of life across Africa.

His contributions to agricultural development and economic transformation have been recognised by governments, universities, and international organisations across Africa and beyond.

== Awards and honors ==
- 2010, Borlaug CAST Communication Award, Council for Agricultural Science and Technology (CAST)
- 2013, Forbes Africa Person of the Year
- 2015, one of the Top 100 most influential Africans, New African magazine
- 2018, Honorary Doctor, Afe Babalola University
- 2019, Forbes Africa Person of the Year (2nd time)
- 28 January 2020, Honorary Doctor of Science, Federal University Of Agriculture, Abeokuta, Nigeria
- 14 May 2022, Honorary Doctorate, Addis Ababa University, Ethiopia, for contributions to the field of economics
- 2023, Doctor of Science, Veritas University Abuja
- 2024, Honorary Degree of Doctor of Business Administration, Bayero University, Kano

=== National ===
- Nigeria:
  - Commander of the Order of the Federal Republic - 2012

=== Foreign ===
- Kenya:
  - Chief of the Order of the Golden Heart (CGH) - 2025
- Cameroon:
  - Grand Officer of the Order of Valour - 2017
- Gambia:
  - Honorary Grand Commander of the Order of the Republic of The Gambia - 2023
- Liberia:
  - Grand Cordon of the Order of the Star of Africa - 2018
- Niger:
  - Grand Officer of the National Order of Niger - 2017
- Senegal:
  - Grand Officer of the National Order of the Lion - 2015
- Togo:
  - Grand Commander of the Order of Mono - 2018
- Tunisia:
  - Grand Officer of the National Order of Merit of Tunisia - 2019
