= Fderik Airport =

- IATA: FGD; ICAO: GQPF

Summary
- Airport type: Public
- Serves: Fderik
- Elevation AMSL: 961 ft / 293 m
- Coordinates: 22°40′20″N 12°43′50″W

Map
- Location of the airport in Mauritania

Runways
Direction	Length		Surface
Direction	ft	m	Surface
05/23	6,020	1,835	Sand
- Source: Google Maps

Fderik Airport (IATA: FGD, ICAO: GQPF) is an airport serving the town of Fderik in Mauritania.

== See also ==
- Transport in Mauritania
