= Bir Moghrein Airport =

- IATA: none; ICAO: GQPT

Summary
- Airport type: Public / Military
- Serves: Bir Moghrein, Mauritania
- Elevation AMSL: 1,194 ft (364 m)
- Coordinates: 25°14′12″N 011°35′19″W
- Interactive map of Bir Moghrein Airport

Runways
Direction	Length		Surface
Direction	m	ft	Surface
01/19	1,780	5,840	Asphalt
- Source: DAFIF

Bir Moghrein Airport (ICAO: GQPT) is an airport serving Bir Moghrein, a city in the Tiris Zemmour region of Mauritania.
