= Tamchakett =

Tamchakett تامشكط
- Town
- Location in Mauritania
- Coordinates: 17°14′N 10°40′W
- Country: Mauritania
- Region: Hodh El Gharbi
- Time zone: UTC+0 (GMT)

Tamchakett (Arabic: تامشكط) is a town and commune in the Hodh El Gharbi region of south-central Mauritania.

Situated on the edge of a plain, the village is south-west of Aoudaghost. In 1974, the village was described as having a population of 641.

== Transport ==
The town is served by Tamchakett Airport (IATA: THT, ICAO: GQNT).
