= Kiffa =

Kiffa كيفه
- Commune and town
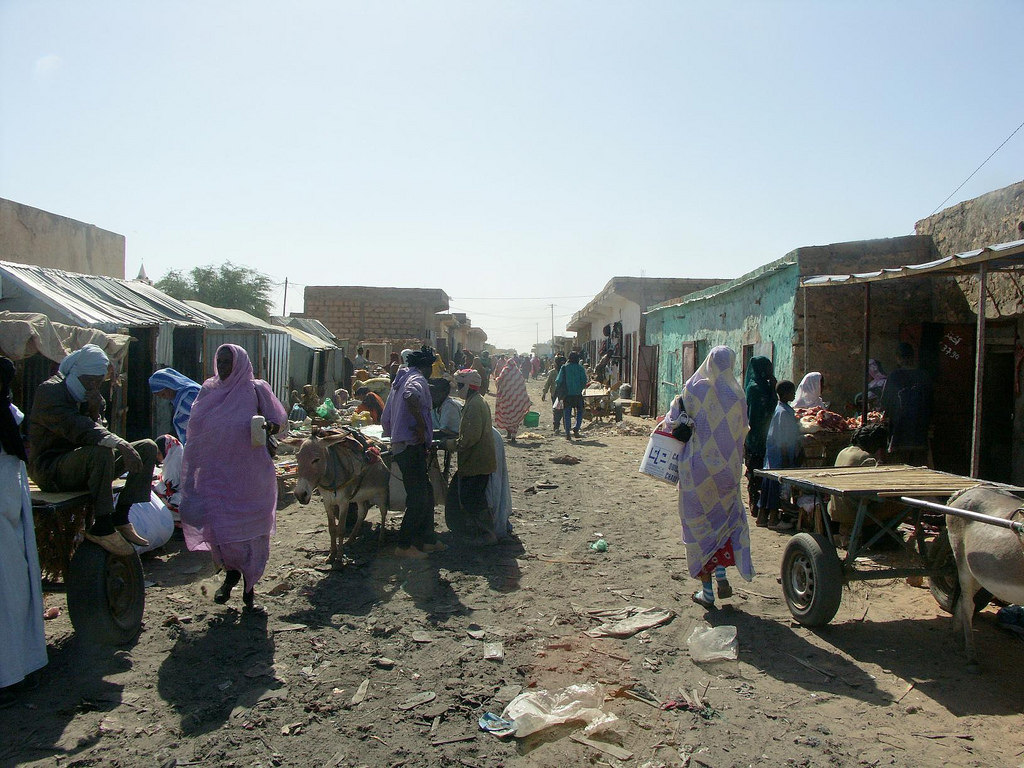
- Kiffa Marketplace

- Location in Mauritania
- Coordinates: 16°37′N 11°24′W
- Country: Mauritania
- Region: Assaba Region

Area
  - Commune and town: 1,078 km^{2} (416 sq mi)
- Elevation: 94 m (308 ft)

Population (2013 census)
  - Commune and town: 60,005
  - Density: 55.66/km^{2} (144.2/sq mi)
  - Urban: 50,206

Kiffa (Arabic: كيفة) is a large town in the far south region of Mauritania, and the name of an administrative area within the local Assaba Region. It is the third most-populous community in Mauritania after Nouakchott and Noaudhibou.

Kiffa is located at 16.63°N 11.4°W, some 600 kilometres (370 mi) from the coast and at the western end of the Aoukar sand sea of southern Mauritania.

== Climate ==
Kiffa has a hot desert climate (Köppen climate classification BWh). The climate is Sahelian, with April to June as the hottest months and eighty-five percent of the low annual rainfall occurring from July to September.

In the 1990s and early 2000s Kiffa benefited from higher rainfall levels than elsewhere in the western Sahel. While Kiffa benefits from the ongoing "greening of the Sahel" the area's rangeland forage ecosystems remain vulnerable and can be subject to damaging overgrazing.

Climate data for Kiffa
Month	Jan	Feb	Mar	Apr	May	Jun	Jul	Aug	Sep	Oct	Nov	Dec	Year
Mean daily maximum °C (°F)	30.7 (87.3)	33.8 (92.8)	37.0 (98.6)	38.1 (100.6)	40.4 (104.7)	40.1 (104.2)	37.2 (99.0)	34.8 (94.6)	37.1 (98.8)	39.0 (102.2)	36.4 (97.5)	30.6 (87.1)	36.3 (97.3)
Daily mean °C (°F)	22.2 (72.0)	25.7 (78.3)	29.5 (85.1)	33.3 (91.9)	36.4 (97.5)	36.9 (98.4)	33.6 (92.5)	32.1 (89.8)	29.6 (85.3)	32.2 (90.0)	28.0 (82.4)	23.1 (73.6)	30.2 (86.4)
Mean daily minimum °C (°F)	14.9 (58.8)	16.1 (61.0)	18.4 (65.1)	19.5 (67.1)	21.6 (70.9)	22.3 (72.1)	23.6 (74.5)	24.5 (76.1)	23.7 (74.7)	23.0 (73.4)	18.8 (65.8)	15.3 (59.5)	20.1 (68.3)
Average rainfall mm (inches)	1 (0.0)	1 (0.0)	1 (0.0)	1 (0.0)	4 (0.2)	24 (0.9)	77 (3.0)	127 (5.0)	80 (3.1)	15 (0.6)	2 (0.1)	1 (0.0)	333 (13.1)
Average relative humidity (%)	22	20	19	17	23	40	57	69	60	42	35	24	36
Source: Arab Meteorology Book

== Population, infrastructure and agriculture ==
Kiffa was allowed to grow haphazardly and to sprawl during the later 20th century, and it has continued to do so. Near Kiffa is Kiffa Airport which has a tarmac runway of over 1,600 yards in length. But all practical travel to other parts of Mauritania is undertaken by taxi cars and trucks.

About two thirds of the population are settled Berber pastoralists, who as late as the 1950s operated as sheep, goat and camel herding nomads. Political and social life is largely dictated by hereditary family allegiances, now expressed amid a complex wider tangle of religious, regionalist and nationalist affiliations.

From 1948 the French colonists ran experimental palm-date plantations in the red soil around Kiffa, having had great success with date-growing elsewhere in Mauritania, but labor and water shortages caused these to fail by 1952. A small-scale reforestation program, intended to guard against sand dune encroachment, was tried to little effect in the late 1980s.

China has had a healthcare aid relationship with Mauritania since 1968, and as of 2013 Chinese volunteer doctors continued to offer their services at Kiffa hospital. The nation of Japan is also involved in health-related aid to Kiffa, having funded a major Study on Groundwater Development for Kiffa. In 2002, Japan followed up the report by undertaking the first of an ongoing series of US$5 million worth of projects that now supply basic drinking water and basic water sanitation.

The town's Berber nomadic heritage meant that Kiffa has continued to support an extensive livestock trade based on bush forage grazing, mixed with limited millet-based agrarian activity. A large produce market at Kiffa continues to attract traders and buyers from the surrounding area, and this trade is being supported by ongoing road repair schemes in the region. For instance, the International Monetary Fund noted in a 2011 report that - with Chinese aid - Mauritania was "starting rehabilitation and extension works on the Kiffa-Tintane road", Tintane being a large town of 100,000 near the Mali border and about 160 km (100 mi) east of Kiffa. The same report also noted the planned building of a 50 MW solar power station at Kiffa, although in 2015 there have been no further reports on the progress of this.

There was a U.S. Peace Corps house in Kiffa which hosted young American volunteers until 2011, when terrorism fears caused the Peace Corps to officially close its program in the country.

== Kiffa beads ==
The south region of Kiffa was home to one of the most notable beadmaking centers in West Africa, famous for its now-antique Kiffa beads, made exclusively by women from secret recipes involving powdered glass. Raymond Maun documented most of the local bead making process in 1949, but was unable to discover the special "glass-cream recipe" still kept secret by local women. Jill Condra in her book Encyclopedia of National Dress: Traditional Clothing Around the World (2013) notes that "There is evidence that Kiffa beads may have been made in Mauritania as early as the ninth century" but that "The last of the traditionally trained bead makers died in the 1970s, so it is a lost art". However Jurgen Busch has given a detailed account of the beads and their place in regional trade, in his 2013 article "Kiffa Beads of Mauritania: A Fall from Grace", and his article also claims to have found a remaining very-old traditional beadmaker living south of Kiffa.

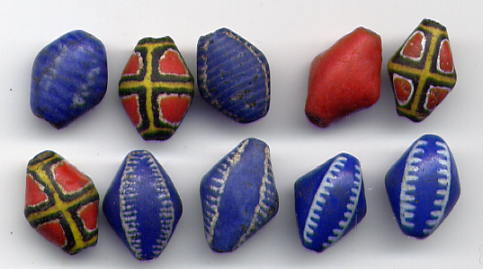
Kiffa bead in the form of a diamond

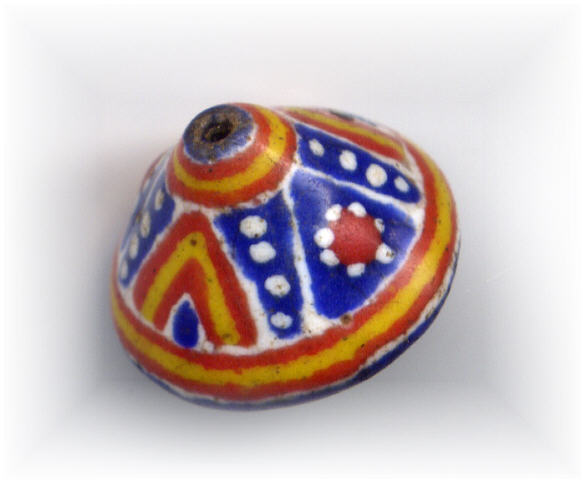
Conical Kiffa bead

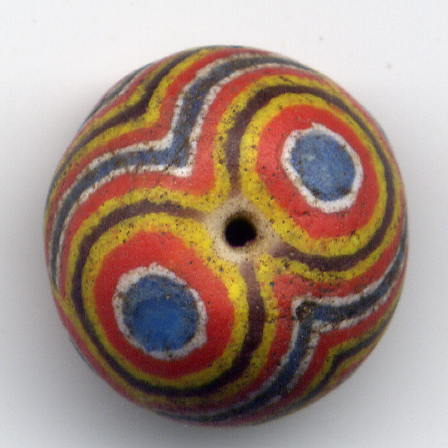
Spherical Kiffa bead

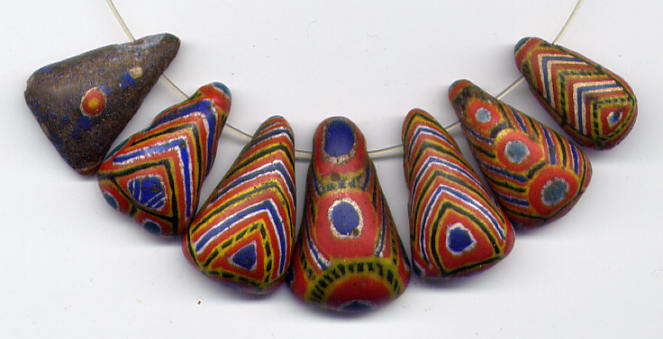
Collection of Kiffa beads

== Affolle mountains ==
The Affolle mountains or Massif de l'Affolle near Kiffa covers a region of more than 6,500 km^{2} (2,500 sq mi). The mountains are populated in tiny agrarian settlements that are usually centered on a spring emerging from the foot of a high escarpment. The largest settlement is Tamchaket located at the northern-western edge and Tintane at the south-eastern edge. The nearest substantial town is Kiffa, on the plain about 50 km (30 mi) to the west of the mountains.

The Affolle mountains are steep-sided massifs of dense Devonian sandstone, with relatively flat plateaus at their summits. The Affolle also has steppe and desert canyon bottoms, and several large wetland areas. The mountains have more rain than the surrounding plain. A few kilometers to the north, surrounded by the southern tip of the Aoukar sand sea, is an outlying island mountain plateau named Rkiss.

French colonialists wrote a number of detailed accounts of the area at various points during the 20th century. The French naturalist Lieutenant P. Boery documented the outlying Rkiss 'mountain island' in the mid 1920s. A study of the area's hydrology was published in French in 1960. And the geology of the Affolle was fully surveyed and understood by the 1960s. Some unproductive modern mineral exploration was commissioned in the early 1980s, such as a survey of the copper in and south of the Affolle.

Until the 1980s there were known to be small elephants (Loxodonta africana) surviving as relic populations in the Affolle valleys. But a proposed national park for them failed to materialize and more recently the conservation literature has presumed that the elephant has become extinct throughout Mauritania.

Relic populations of a Nile crocodile (Crocodylus niloticus laurenti, 1768), once presumed extinct, were found in the late 1990s at four wetlands sites in the Affole. The scientific report on these animals found that local beliefs afforded them some protection, since the "Mauritanian villagers living near the wetlands believe that if the crocodiles are killed the water will disappear and bad luck befall the village".

== Abderrahmane Sissako ==
The acclaimed West African filmmaker Abderrahmane Sissako was born in Kiffa. He has spent many decades away from Kiffa, over the border in Mali and in northern Europe. But he returned to film Kiffa for the opening section of one of his films, Rostov-Luanda (1997).

== 1970 meteorite impact ==
Among the astronomical community Kiffa is known as the site of impact of a medium-sized meteorite in 1970. The meteorite struck about 8.0 km (5 mi) south-east of Kiffa on 23 October 1970, and was sufficiently large to leave many fragments of fused crust to be collected by a German mine operator.
