= Akjoujt =

Akjoujt أكجوجت
- City
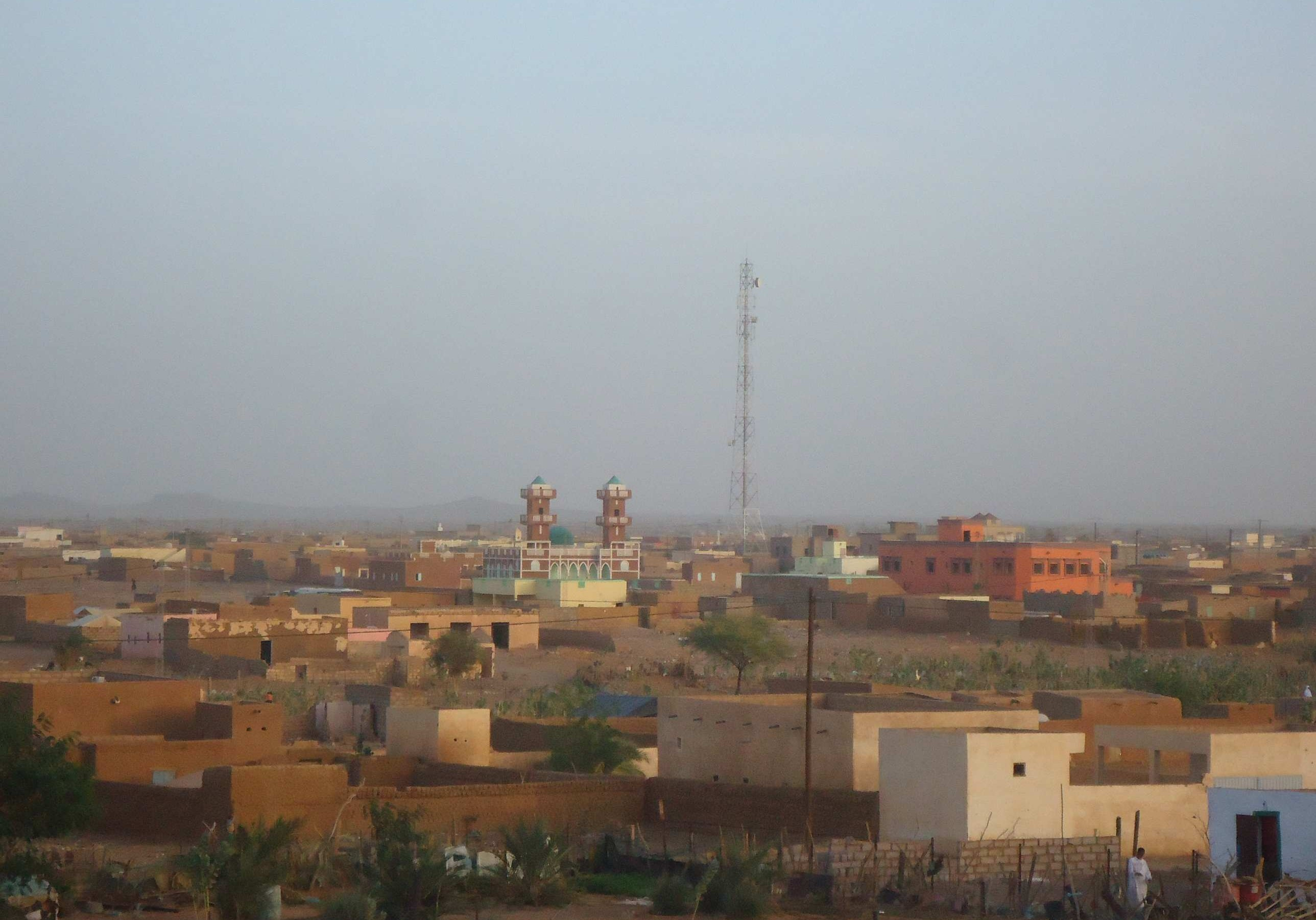
- Skyline of Akjoujt

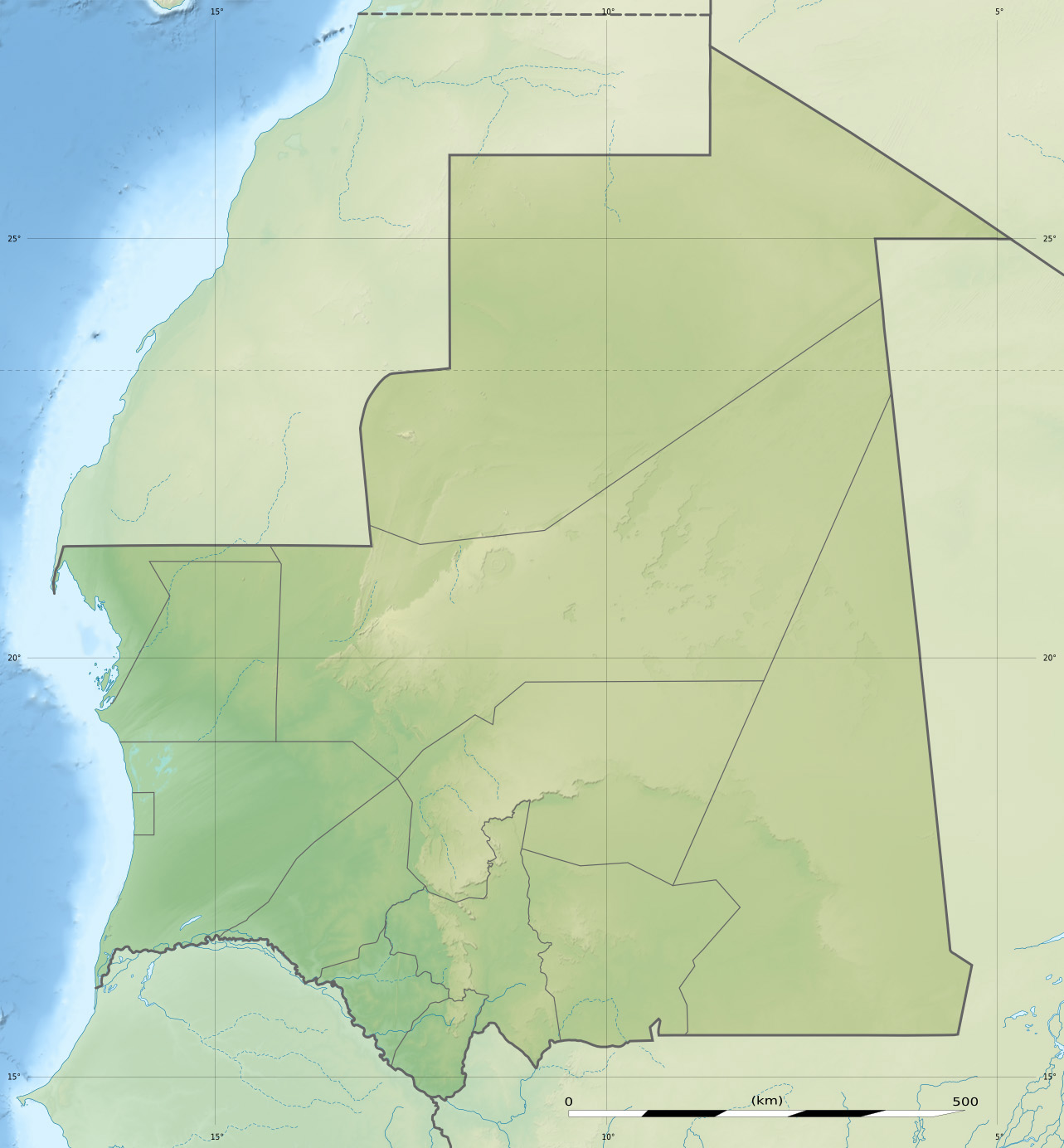
- Location in Mauritania
- Coordinates: 19°44′45″N 14°23′16″W
- Country: Mauritania
- Region: Inchiri
- Elevation: 118 m (388 ft)

Population
  - Total: 11,235
- Time zone: UTC+00:00 (GMT)

Akjoujt (Arabic: أكجوجت) is a small city in western Mauritania. It is the capital of the Inchiri region. "Akjoujt" (ɑk'ʤuʤt) means 'wells'. The city's main industry is gold and copper mining.

== History ==
Archeologists have discovered that as early as 1000 BC, copper smelting and mining was occurring in Akjoujt. According to archeologist Nicole N. Lambert, metallurgical traces and discovery sites proves relation between Mauritanian metallurgy and the introduction of Berbers into the western Sahara and the Sahel.

In 1992, the city's old copper mine was repurposed into a gold mine. The company, Mines d'Or d'Akjoujt (MORAK), which was government-subsidized, was using many volatile and dangerous chemicals in the mines, and livestock and other animals in the area began to die. The runoff from the mine was stored in a plastic-lined retention pond and was very close to the city's water supply. Despite warnings that the rainfall in the area could cause the toxic material to spread, the mining continued for four years. MORAK, in order to boost support, offered free drinking water and placed fences around the facility, but had little effect on public opinion.

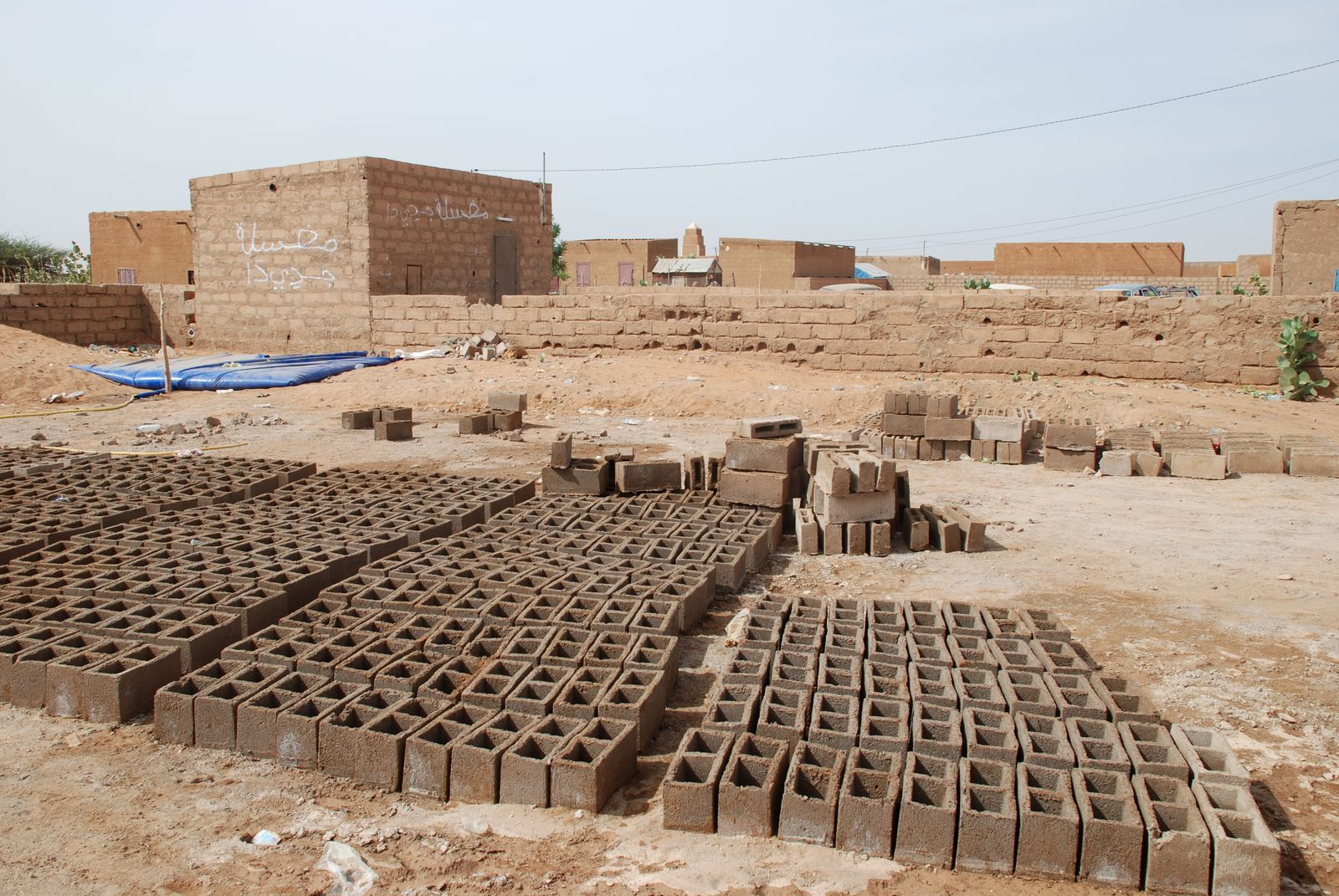
Homes being built in Akjoujt

The Mauritanian government allegedly suppressed information regarding the mine's safety issues and MORAK fired employees who reported health problems. The director of health in Akjoujt was transferred to Nouakchott after he suggested health screenings for miners. The gold mine closed in 1996. As of 2011, the Mauritanian government was planning to expand and rehabilitate the water supply system in Akjoujt and several other cities and towns.

Former Mauritanian President Mohamed Ould Abdel Aziz is a native of Akjoujt.

Summers in Akjoujt are extremely hot, with temperatures reaching up to 50.0 degrees Celsius (122 degrees Fahrenheit).

== Sister cities ==
Akjoujt is twinned with:

- Meram, Konya Province, Turkey
