= Néma Airport =

Néma Airport مطار النعمة (Arabic)
- IATA: EMN; ICAO: GQNI

Summary
- Airport type: Public
- Owner: Government
- Operator: Government
- Serves: Néma, Mauritania
- Location: Néma
- Elevation AMSL: 745 ft (227 m)
- Coordinates: 16°37′19″N 007°18′59″W

Map
- Location within Mauritania

Runways
Direction	Length		Surface
Direction	m	ft	Surface
09/27	2,700	6,890	Asphalt
- Source: DAFIF

Néma Airport (IATA: EMN, ICAO: GQNI) is an airport serving Néma, a city in the Hodh Ech Chargui region of southeastern Mauritania.

== Airlines and destinations ==
Airlines	Destinations
Mauritania Airlines	Nouakchott
