= Atar International Airport =

Atar Airport

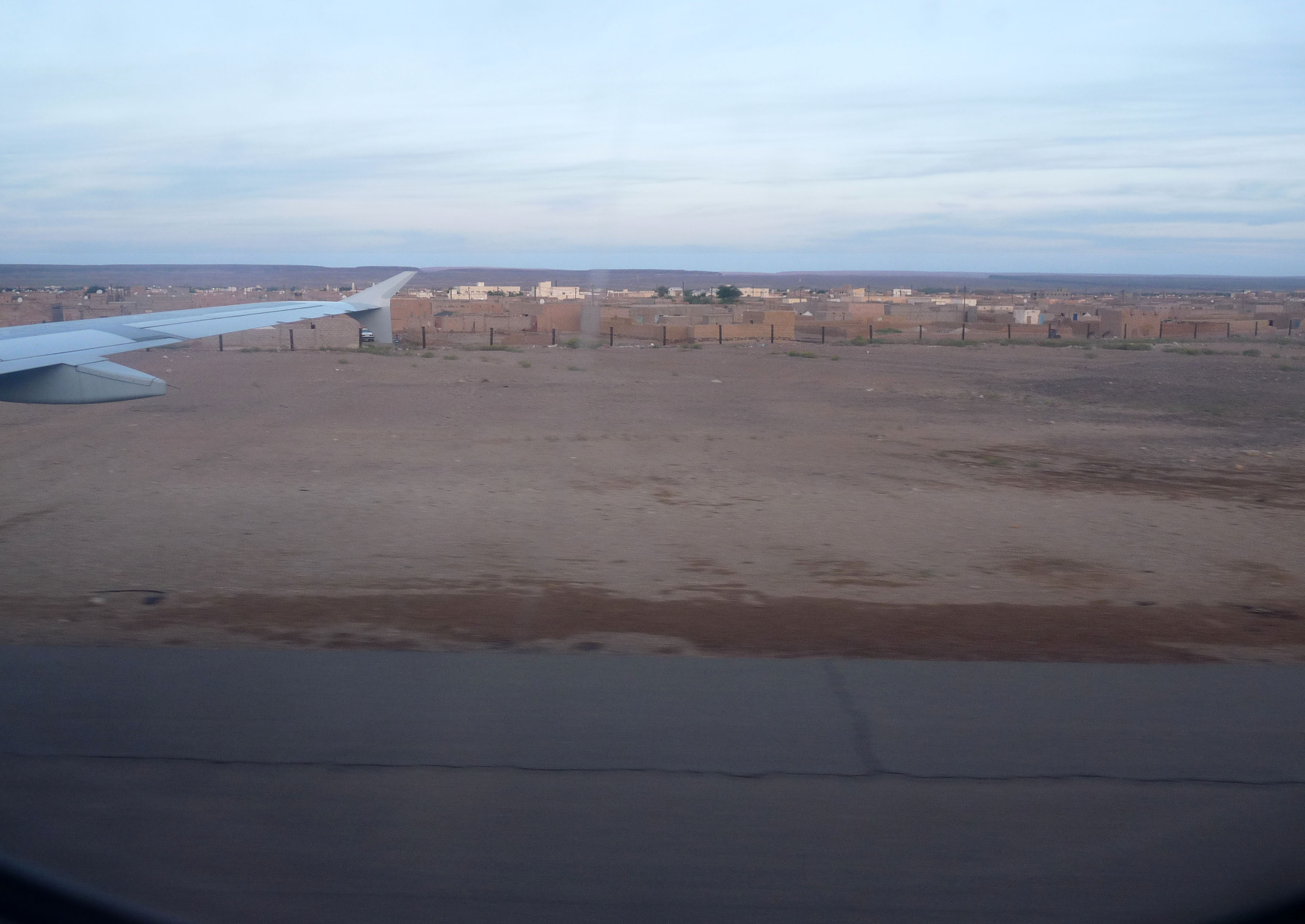
- IATA: ATR; ICAO: GQPA

Summary
- Airport type: Public
- Owner: Government
- Location: Atar, Mauritania
- Elevation AMSL: 761 ft / 232 m
- Coordinates: 20°30′24″N 013°02′35″W

Map
- Location within Mauritania

Runways
Direction	Length		Surface
Direction	m	ft	Surface
04/22	3,004	9,855	Asphalt
- Source: DAFIF

Atar Airport or Atar International Airport (IATA: ATR, ICAO: GQPA) is an airport serving Atar, a town in the Adrar Region of Mauritania.

== World War II ==
During World War II, the airport was used by the United States Army Air Forces Air Transport Command as a stopover for cargo, transiting aircraft and personnel on the North African Cairo-Dakar transport route for cargo, transiting aircraft and personnel. It connected to Dakar Airport in the South and Agadir Airport to the north.
