= Sélibaby =

Sélibaby Arabic: سليبابي
- Commune and town
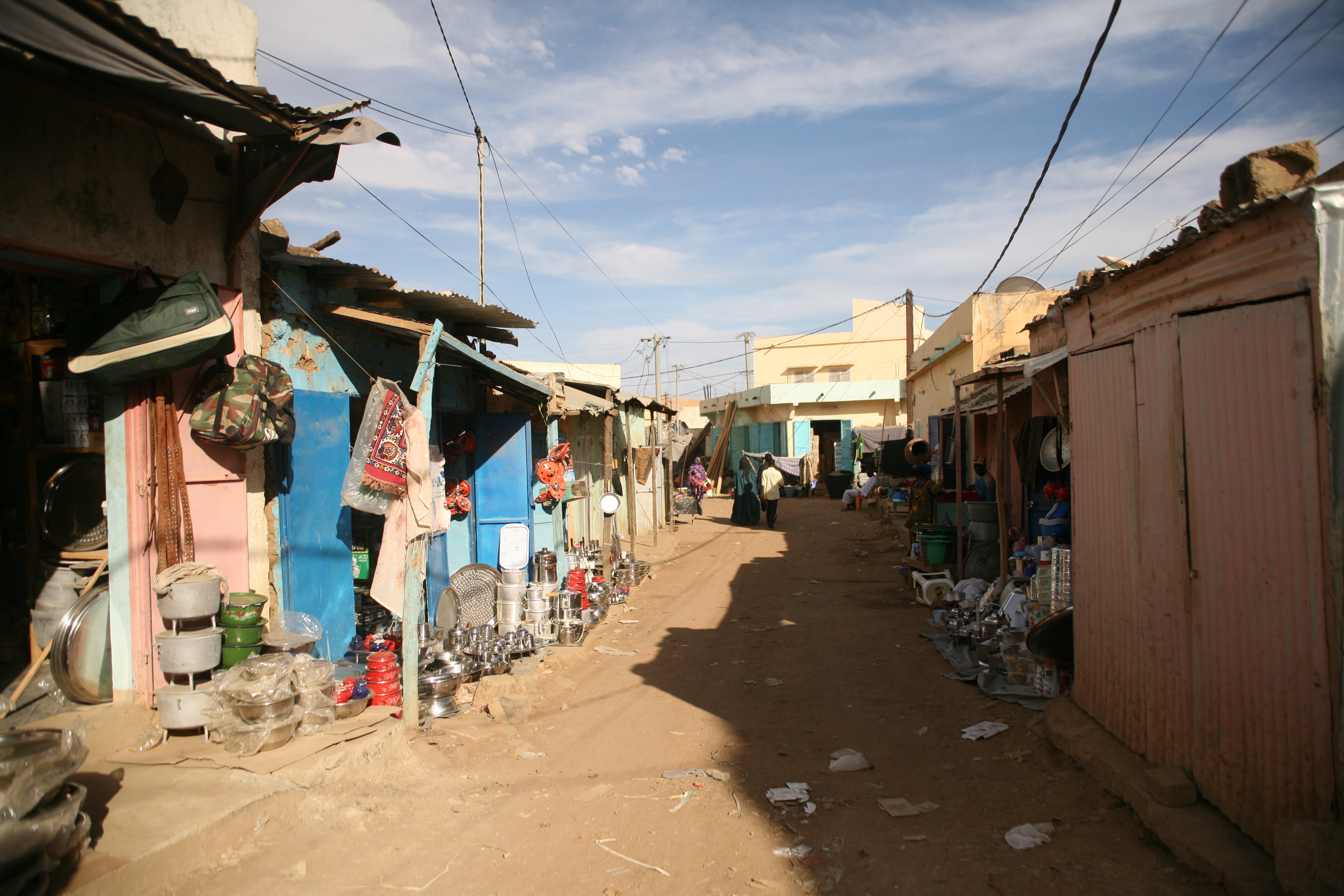
- A view from a commercial street in Sélibaby

- Location in Mauritania
- Coordinates: 15°9′33″N 12°11′00″W
- Country: Mauritania
- Region: Guidimaka Region

Area
  - Total: 2,000 km^{2} (770 sq mi)
- Elevation: 62 m (203 ft)

Population (2013 census)
  - Total: 26,420

Sélibaby (Arabic: سليبابي) is a capital town and department of the Guidimaka Region, in Mauritania. It is located at around 15°9′33″N 12°11′00″W.

It is divided into a number of "quartiers", which include College, Silo, Ferlo, Nezaha, Saada, El Jedidah, Bambaradougou, and amongst many others.

== Demographics ==
Sélibaby is inhabited by the majority of Sub-Saharan Mauritanians, primarily from the Wolof, Toucouleur, and Soninke ethnic groups. There is also the presence of Black Moors (Haratin), a number of White Moors (Beidane), and other Sub-Saharan peoples, such as the Serer, Fula, Bambara, and others.

The population is almost entirely Muslim (>99%), but there are ethnic religious minorities and Roman Catholics whose numbers may be very small.

== Facilities ==
Sélibaby also has a regional hospital, funded by the Chinese Government and partially staffed by Chinese doctors and is the headquarters of the regional director of health.

Selibaby is also a center for NGOs who operate in the region.

== Climate ==
Sélibaby has a hot semi-arid climate (Köppen BSh). The city is among the wettest in the country due to its significant exposure to the West African Monsoon, with about 452 mm (17.80 in) of precipitation falling annually. The average annual temperature in Sélibaby is 29.0 °C (84.2 °F).

Climate data for Selibaby
Month	Jan	Feb	Mar	Apr	May	Jun	Jul	Aug	Sep	Oct	Nov	Dec	Year
Mean daily maximum °C (°F)	33.5 (92.3)	36.0 (96.8)	38.7 (101.7)	40.7 (105.3)	41.1 (106.0)	38.6 (101.5)	34.7 (94.5)	33.0 (91.4)	34.2 (93.6)	36.9 (98.4)	36.3 (97.3)	33.1 (91.6)	36.4 (97.5)
Mean daily minimum °C (°F)	15.5 (59.9)	17.3 (63.1)	20.6 (69.1)	24.1 (75.4)	26.2 (79.2)	26.2 (79.2)	24.6 (76.3)	23.7 (74.7)	23.5 (74.3)	22.5 (72.5)	19.0 (66.2)	16.5 (61.7)	21.6 (71.0)
Average rainfall mm (inches)	0 (0)	1 (0.0)	0 (0)	0 (0)	3 (0.1)	48 (1.9)	109 (4.3)	157 (6.2)	109 (4.3)	23 (0.9)	1 (0.0)	1 (0.0)	452 (17.7)
Source: Climate-Data.org, Climate data
