= Aioun el Atrouss Airport =

- IATA: AEO; ICAO: GQNA

Summary
- Airport type: Public
- Operator: Government
- Serves: Aioun el Atrouss, Mauritania
- Elevation AMSL: 965 ft (294 m)
- Coordinates: 16°42′40″N 009°38′16″W

Map
- Location within Mauritania

Runways
Direction	Length		Surface
Direction	m	ft	Surface
04/22	1,599	5,245	Asphalt
- Source: DAFIF

Aioun el Atrouss Airport (IATA: AEO, ICAO: GQNA) is an airport located in Aioun el Atrouss (also known as Ayoun al Atrous), a town in southern Mauritania, which is the capital of the Hodh El Gharbi region.
