= Kiffa Airport =

Kiffa Airport مطار كيفه
- IATA: KFA; ICAO: GQNF

Summary
- Airport type: Public
- Owner: Government
- Operator: Government
- Serves: Kiffa
- Location: Kiffa, Mauritania
- Elevation AMSL: 423 ft (129 m)
- Coordinates: 16°35′23″N 011°24′22″W

Map
- Location within Mauritania

Runways
Direction	Length		Surface
Direction	m	ft	Surface
07/25	2,500	8,202	Asphalt
- Source: DAFIF

Kiffa Airport (IATA: KFA, ICAO: GQNF) is an airport serving Kiffa, a city in the Assaba region of southern-est Mauritania.
