= Kaédi =

Kaédi كيهيدي
- Commune and town
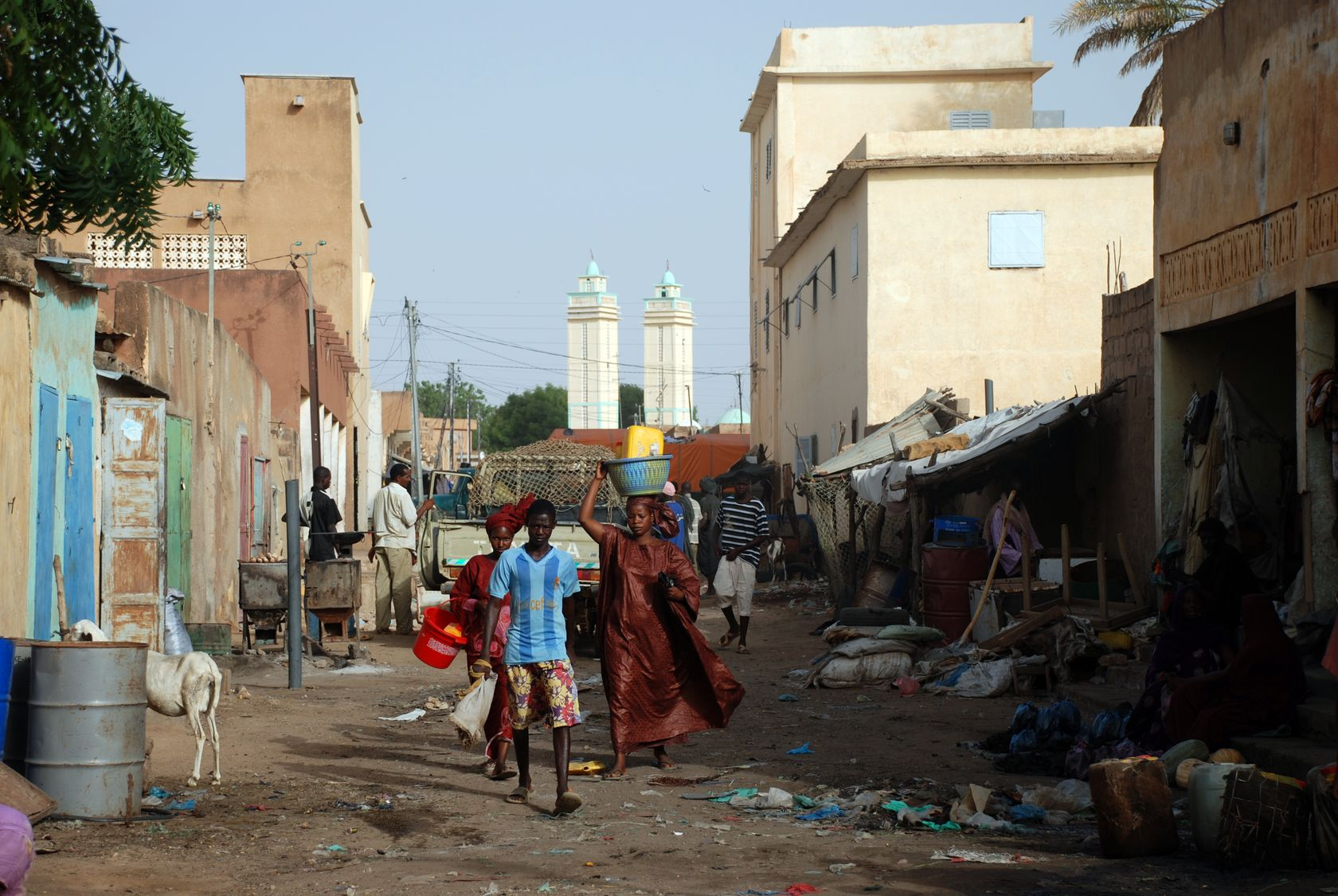
- Kaédi Town Centre

- Location in Mauritania
- Coordinates: 16°09′02″N 13°30′20″W
- Country: Mauritania
- Region: Gorgol

Government
  - Mayor: Demba Samba N'Diaye (2023)
- Elevation: 23 m (75 ft)

Population (2013 census)
  - Commune and town: 49,152
  - Metro: 121,726

Kaédi (Arabic: كيهيدي) is the largest city and administrative center of the Gorgol Region of Southern Mauritania, located on the border with Senegal. It is approximately 435 km from Mauritania's capital, Nouakchott.

== Overview ==
The city sits within the "Chemama" Riverine zone along the north bank of the River Senegal where it connects with the Gorgol River, fulani are the largest tribe in the city. This region is one of the few areas of settled agriculture in the country. Culturally, the city is among the most diverse in Mauritania, consisting of ethnic "White Moors" (Arabic: البيضان) and "Black Moors" (Arabic: السودان), as well as Pulaar, and Soninke communities.

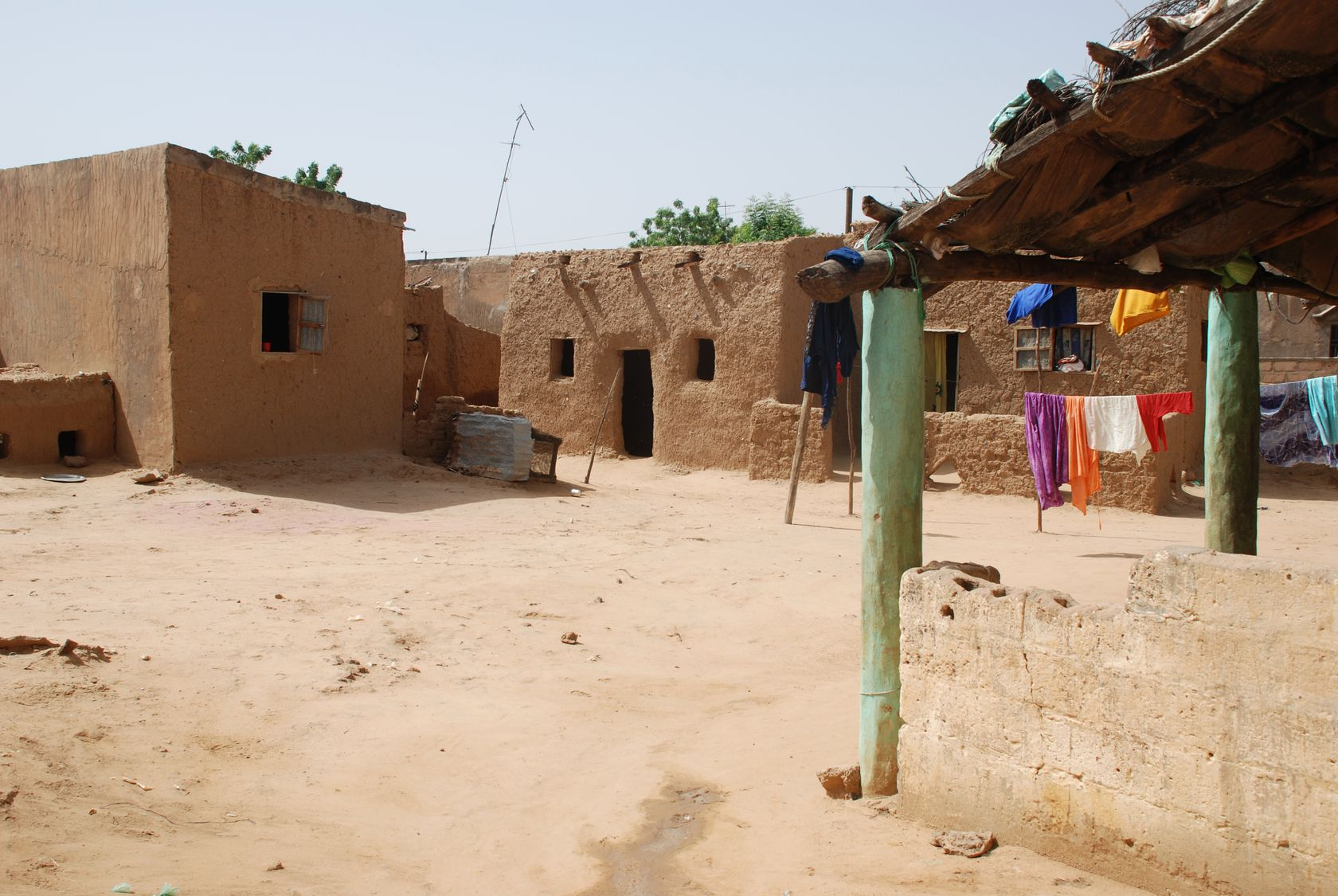
Houses in Kaedi

It is known as a market town, a medical center, and a center for local farmers. The market reflects the sub-Saharan culture of neighboring Senegal somewhat more than the Moorish-Arabic culture found further north in the country.

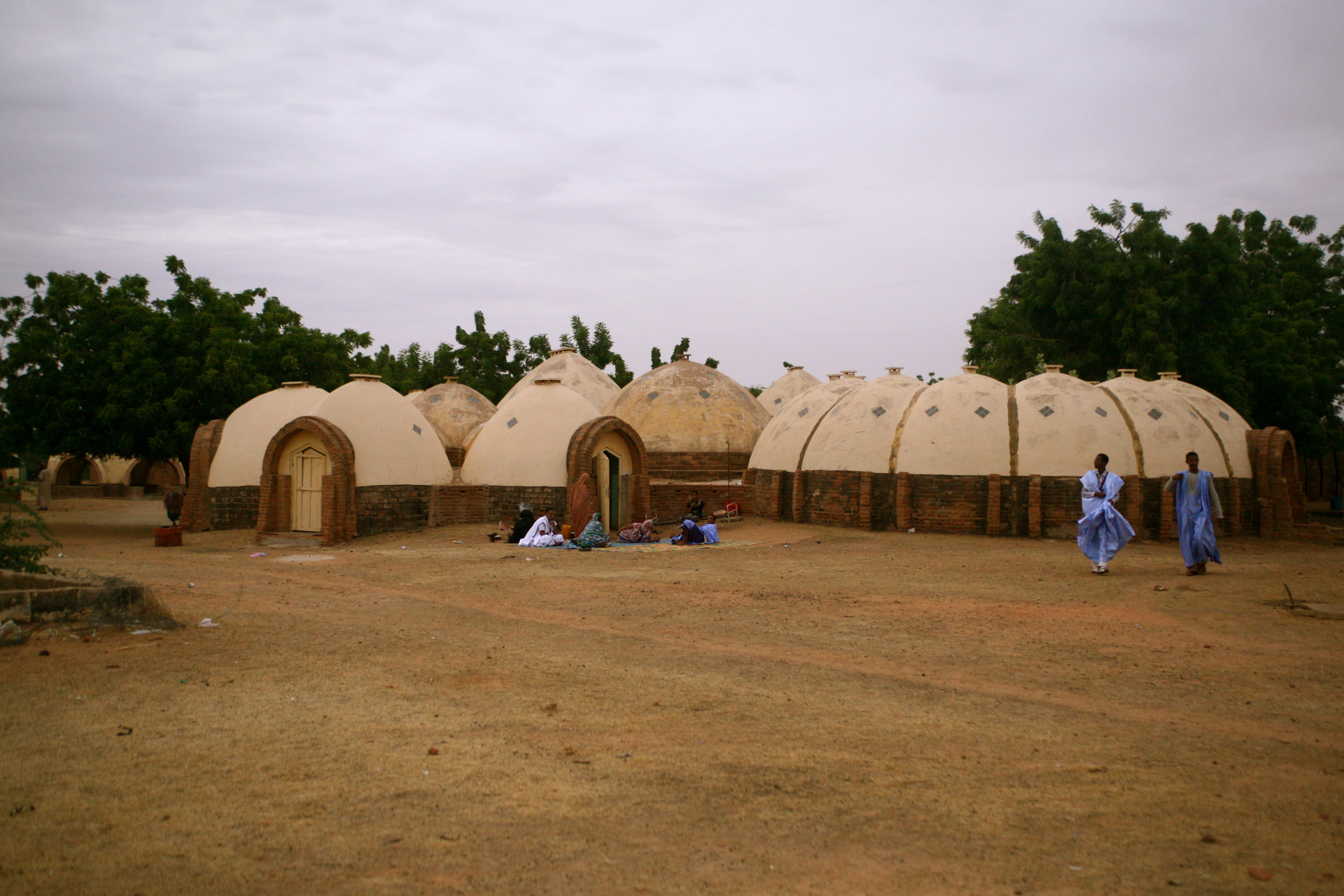
Kaedi Regional Hospital

Most of the architecture consists of brown, flat-roofed buildings, undistinguished except that most are surrounded by "dutch brick" enclosures. The one exception is the unusual architecture of the Kaédi Regional Hospital, which was constructed in 1989 and features multiple beehive-style domes. The award-winning architecture was designed by the Association for the Development of Traditional African Urbanism and Architecture (ADAUA), which aims to develop indigenous African urban architectural designs using local materials and technologies.

== See also ==
- Transport in Mauritania
- Railway stations in Mauritania
