= Regions of Mauritania =

First-level administrative divisions of Mauritania

- A clickable map of Mauritania exhibiting its twelve regions and one capital district.
- Category: Region
- Location: Mauritania
- Number: 15 (as of 2023)
- Populations: 19,639–430,668
- Areas: 156–252,900 km^{2} (60–97,645 sq mi)

Mauritania is divided into 15 regions (wilayat):

Regions
| Map key | Name | Native name | Capital | Area | Population (2023) |
|---|---|---|---|---|---|
| 1 | Adrar | أدرار | Atar | 235,000 km^{2} (91,000 sq mi) | 71,623 |
| 2 | Assaba | لعصابة | Kiffa | 36,600 km^{2} (14,100 sq mi) | 451,804 |
| 3 | Brakna | لبراكنة | Aleg | 33,000 km^{2} (13,000 sq mi) | 391,310 |
| 4 | Dakhlet Nouadhibou | داخلة نواذيبو | Nouadhibou | 23,090 km^{2} (8,920 sq mi) | 184,459 |
| 5 | Gorgol | كوركول | Kaédi | 13,600 km^{2} (5,300 sq mi) | 442,490 |
| 6 | Guidimaka | غيديماغا | Sélibaby | 10,300 km^{2} (4,000 sq mi) | 363,075 |
| 7 | Hodh Ech Chargui | الحوض الشرقي | Néma | 182,700 km^{2} (70,500 sq mi) | 625,643 |
| 8 | Hodh El Gharbi | الحوض الغربي | Ayoun el Atrous | 53,400 km^{2} (20,600 sq mi) | 403,091 |
| 9 | Inchiri | إينشيري | Akjoujt | 46,800 km^{2} (18,100 sq mi) | 29,484 |
| 10 | Nouakchott-Nord | نواكشوط الشمالية | Dar-Naim | 306 km^{2} (118 sq mi) | 614,465 |
| 10 | Nouakchott-Ouest | نواكشوط الغربية | Tevragh-Zeina | 146 km^{2} (56 sq mi) | 204,881 |
| 10 | Nouakchott-Sud | نواكشوط الجنوبية | Arafat | 252 km^{2} (97 sq mi) | 627,415 |
| 11 | Tagant | تكانت | Tidjikja | 98,340 km^{2} (37,970 sq mi) | 114,760 |
| 12 | Tiris Zemmour | تيرس زمور | Zouérat | 252,900 km^{2} (97,600 sq mi) | 79,129 |
| 13 | Trarza | الترارزه | Rosso | 67,800 km^{2} (26,200 sq mi) | 323,903 |

During the Mauritanian occupation of Western Sahara (1975–79), its portion of the territory (mainly corresponding to the lower half of Río de Oro province) was named Tiris al-Gharbiyya.

The regions (wilaya) are subdivided into 44 departments; see departments of Mauritania for more information.

== See also ==
- ISO 3166-2:MR
