= Tidjikja Airport =

- IATA: TIY; ICAO: GQND

Summary
- Airport type: Public
- Operator: Government
- Serves: Tidjikja, Mauritania
- Elevation AMSL: 1,342 ft (409 m)
- Coordinates: 18°34′12″N 011°25′24″W

Map
- Location within Mauritania

Runways
Direction	Length		Surface
Direction	m	ft	Surface
07/25	1,600	5,249	Asphalt
- Source: DAFIF

Tidjikja Airport (IATA: TIY, ICAO: GQND) is an airport serving Tidjikja, the capital of the Tagant region of central Mauritania.

On 1 July 1994, Air Mauritanie Flight 625 crashed near the airport. All four crew and 76 of the 89 passengers were killed in the crash, the deadliest in Mauritanian history.
