= Twajeel, Mauritania =

Village in Mauritania near the Western Sahara Territory

Twajeel Arabic: اتواجيل French: Touâjîl Berber languages: Touajil
- Village
- Location within Mauritania
- Coordinates: 22°10′31″N 12°40′32″W
- Country: Mauritania
- Region: Tiris Zemmour
- Departments: Fderîck
- Time zone: UTC±00:00 (GMT)
- Area code: 7CJ958GF+3R

Twajeel (Arabic: اتواجيل) is a village in Mauritania near the disputed Western Sahara territory. There is a school called the Mudarsahtu-Twajeel which set to open in 2023. There is also an airport called the Twajeel Airport, which books flights to Fderîck and Zouerat. A train station is also located in the town called Mateo Twajeel.
