= Mbagne =

- Commune and town
- Location in Mauritania
- Coordinates: 16°9′N 13°47′W
- Country: Mauritania
- Region: Brakna
- Department: M'Bagne (department)

Government
  - Mayor: Diop Amadou El Hadj Samba Diop (PRDS)

Population (2023 census)
  - Total: 12,719
- Time zone: UTC+0 (GMT)

Mbagne is a town and commune in the Brakna Region of southern Mauritania on the border with Senegal. Mbagne has a high unemployment rate and an unstable agriculture system, according to the OECD.

In 2013, it had a population of 11,859. In 2023, it had a population of 12,719.
