= Bouhdida =

- Commune and town
- Country: Mauritania
- Region: Brakna
- Department: Aleg (department)

Government
  - Mayor: Ahmed Ebeidi El Maouloud

Population (2023)
  - Total: 27,203
- Time zone: UTC+0 (GMT)

Bouhdida is a town and commune in the Brakna Region of southern Mauritania.

In 2000, it had a population of 10,828. In 2023, it had a population of 27,203.
