= Aghchorguitt =

- Commune and town
- Location in Mauritania
- Coordinates: 16°25′0″N 14°4′2″W
- Country: Mauritania
- Region: Brakna
- Department: Aleg (department)

Government
  - Mayor: Mohamed Mahmoud Habab Haiballa

Area
  - Total: 929 sq mi (2,407 km^{2})

Population (2023 census)
  - Total: 10,328
  - Density: 11.11/sq mi (4.291/km^{2})
- Time zone: UTC+0 (GMT)

Aghchorguitt is a town and commune in the Brakna Region of southern-western Mauritania.

In 2013, it had a population of 10,156. In 2023, it had a population of 10,328.

== Notable people ==
- Ahmed Ould Daddah
