= Cheggar =

- Commune and town
- Country: Mauritania
- Region: Brakna
- Department: Aleg

Government
  - Mayor: Mohamed Ould Sidi Boubacar (PRDS)

Population (2013)
  - Total: 9,180
- Time zone: UTC+0 (GMT)

Cheggar is a town and commune in the Brakna Region of southern Mauritania.

In 2000, it had a population of 9,964.
