= Niabina =

- Commune and town
- Location in Mauritania
- Coordinates: 16°17′N 13°46′W
- Country: Mauritania
- Region: Brakna
- Department: M'Bagne (department)

Government
  - Mayor: Alioune Aly Ba (PRDS)

Area
  - Total: 110.2 sq mi (285.3 km^{2})

Population (2023 census)
  - Total: 15,692
  - Density: 142.5/sq mi (55.00/km^{2})
- Time zone: UTC+0 (GMT)

Niabina is a town and commune in the Brakna Region of southern Mauritania.

In 2013, it had a population of 12,989. In 2023, it had a population of 15,692.
