= Edbaye El Hejaj =

- Commune and village
- Interactive map of Edbaye El Hejaj
- Country: Mauritania
- Region: Brakna
- Department: M'Bagne (department)

Government
  - Mayor: El Meslim Ould Biram (PRDS)

Population (2023)
  - Total: 12,151
- Time zone: UTC+0 (GMT)

Edbaye El Hejaj is a village and rural commune in the Brakna Region of southern Mauritania.

In 2000, the village had a population of 6,958. In 2023, it had a population of 12,151.

== Twinning ==
- Dardilly, France
