= Bagodine =

Coordinates: 16°14′N 13°43′W

- Commune and village
- Interactive map of Bagodine
- Country: Mauritania
- Region: Brakna
- Department: M'Bagne (department)

Government
  - Mayor: Ba Houdou Abdoul (PRDS)

Area
  - Total: 49.4 sq mi (127.9 km^{2})

Population (2023)
  - Total: 12,303
  - Density: 249.1/sq mi (96.19/km^{2})
- Time zone: UTC+0 (GMT)

Bagondine is a village and rural commune in the Brakna Region of southern Mauritania.

In 2013, it had a population of 11,263. In 2023, it had a population of 12,303.
