= Ould Birem =

- Commune and village
- Location in Mauritania
- Coordinates: 16°54′N 15°18′W
- Country: Mauritania
- Region: Brakna
- Department: Bogué (department)

Government
  - Mayor: Amadou Karass Lam (PUD)

Population (2023)
  - Total: 14,362
- Time zone: UTC+0 (GMT)

Ould Birem is a village and rural commune in the Brakna Region of southern Mauritania.

In 2000, it had a population of 9,620. In 2023, it had a population of 14,362.
