= Geography of Mauritania =

Coordinates: 20°00′N 12°00′W

Location of Mauritania

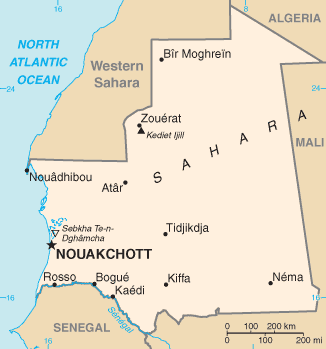
Map of Mauritania

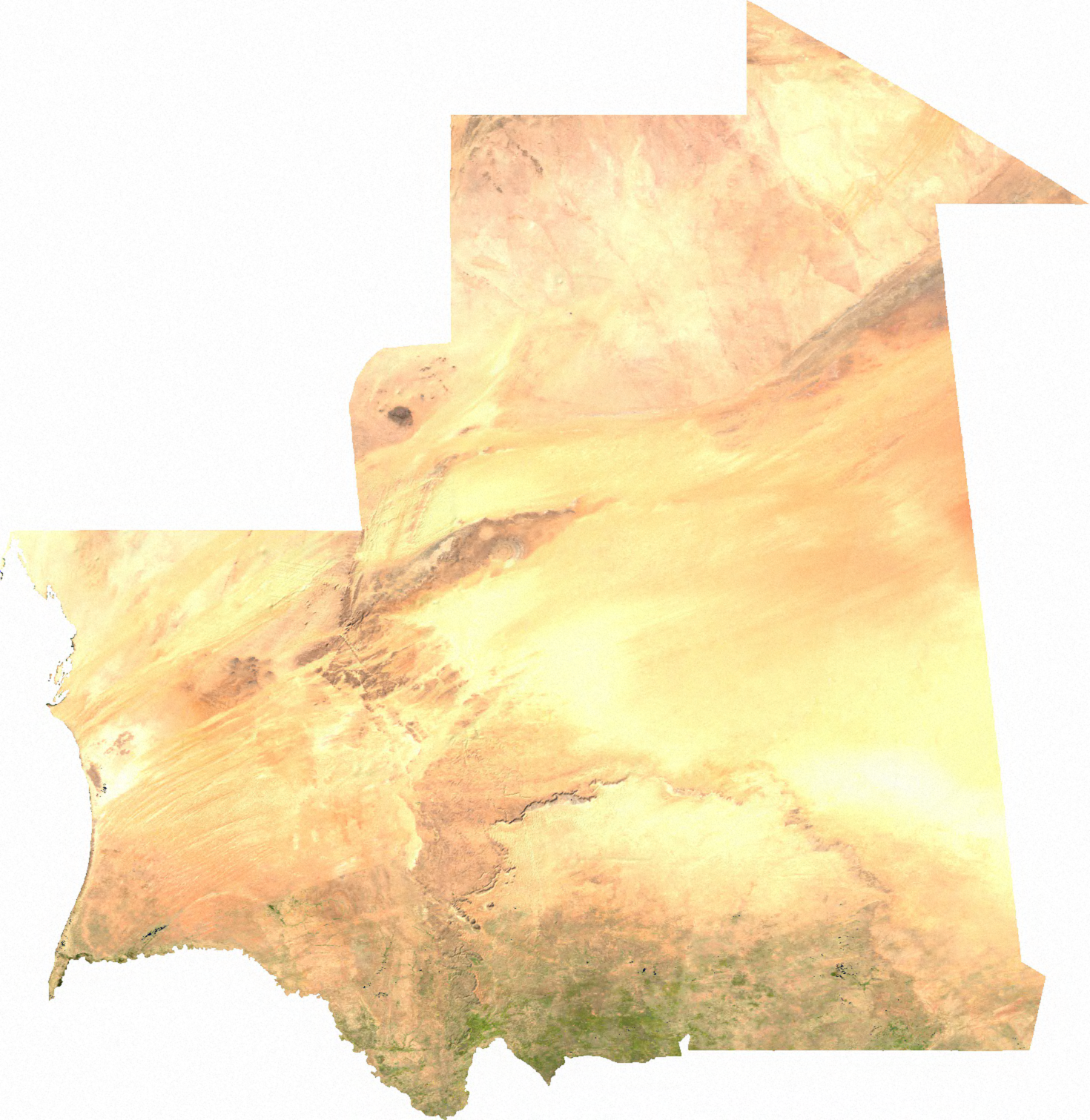
Satellite image of Mauritania

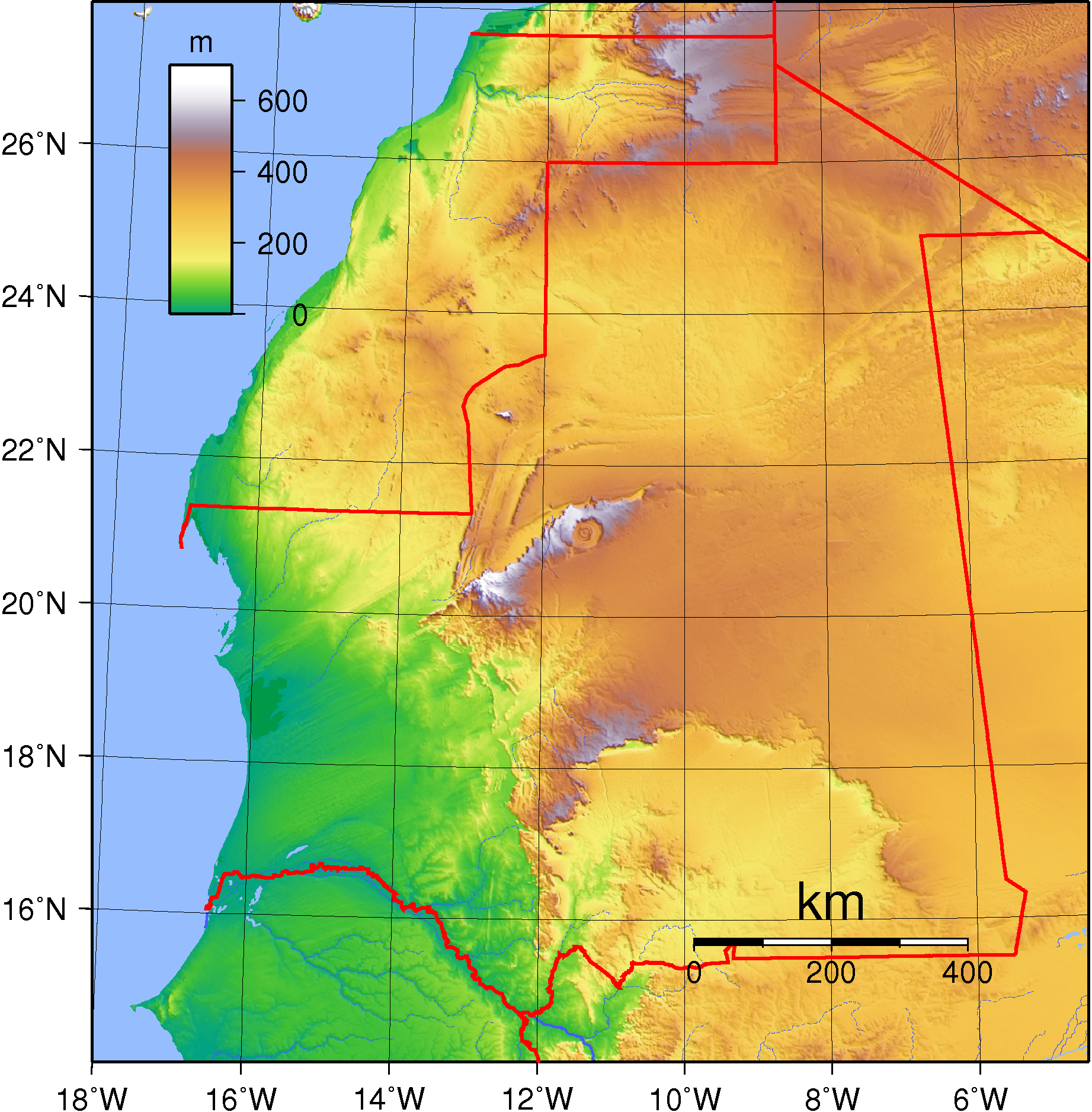
Topography of Mauritania

Köppen–Geiger climate classification map at 1-km resolution for Mauritania 1991–2020

Mauritania, a country in the Western Region of the continent of Africa, is generally flat, its 1,030,700 square kilometres forming vast, arid plains broken by occasional ridges and clifflike outcroppings. Mauritania is the world’s largest country lying entirely below an altitude of 1,000 metres (3,300 ft). It borders the North Atlantic Ocean, between Senegal and Western Sahara, Mali and Algeria. It is considered part of both the Sahel and the Maghreb. A series of scarps face southwest, longitudinally bisecting these plains in the center of the country. The scarps also separate a series of sandstone plateaus, the highest of which is the Adrar Plateau, reaching an elevation of 500 metres or 1,640 feet. Spring-fed oases lie at the foot of some of the scarps. Isolated peaks, often rich in minerals, rise above the plateaus; the smaller peaks are called Guelbs and the larger ones Kedias. The concentric Guelb er Richat is a prominent feature of the north-central region. Kediet ej Jill, near the city of Zouîrât, has an elevation of 915 metres or 3,002 feet and is the highest peak.

Approximately three-fourths of Mauritania is desert or semidesert. As a result of extended, severe drought, the desert has been expanding since the mid-1960s. The plateaus gradually descend toward the northeast to the barren El Djouf, or "Empty Quarter," a vast region of large sand dunes that merges into the Sahara Desert. To the west, between the ocean and the plateaus, are alternating areas of clayey plains (regs) and sand dunes (ergs), some of which shift from place to place, gradually moved by high winds. The dunes generally increase in size and mobility toward the north.

Belts of natural vegetation, corresponding to the rainfall pattern, extend from east to west and range from traces of tropical forest along the Sénégal River to brush and savanna in the southeast. Only sandy desert is found in the centre and north of the country.

== Climate ==
The climate is characterized by extremes in temperature and by meager and irregular rainfall. Annual temperature variations are small, although diurnal variations can be extreme. The harmattan, a hot, dry, and often dust-laden wind, blows from the Sahara throughout the long dry season and is the prevailing wind, except along the narrow coastal strip, which is influenced by oceanic trade winds. Most rain falls during the short rainy season (hivernage), from July to September, and average annual precipitation varies from 500 to 600 millimetres (19.7 to 23.6 in) in the far south to less than 100 millimetres (3.9 in) in the northern two-thirds of the country.

=== Major geographic and climate zones ===
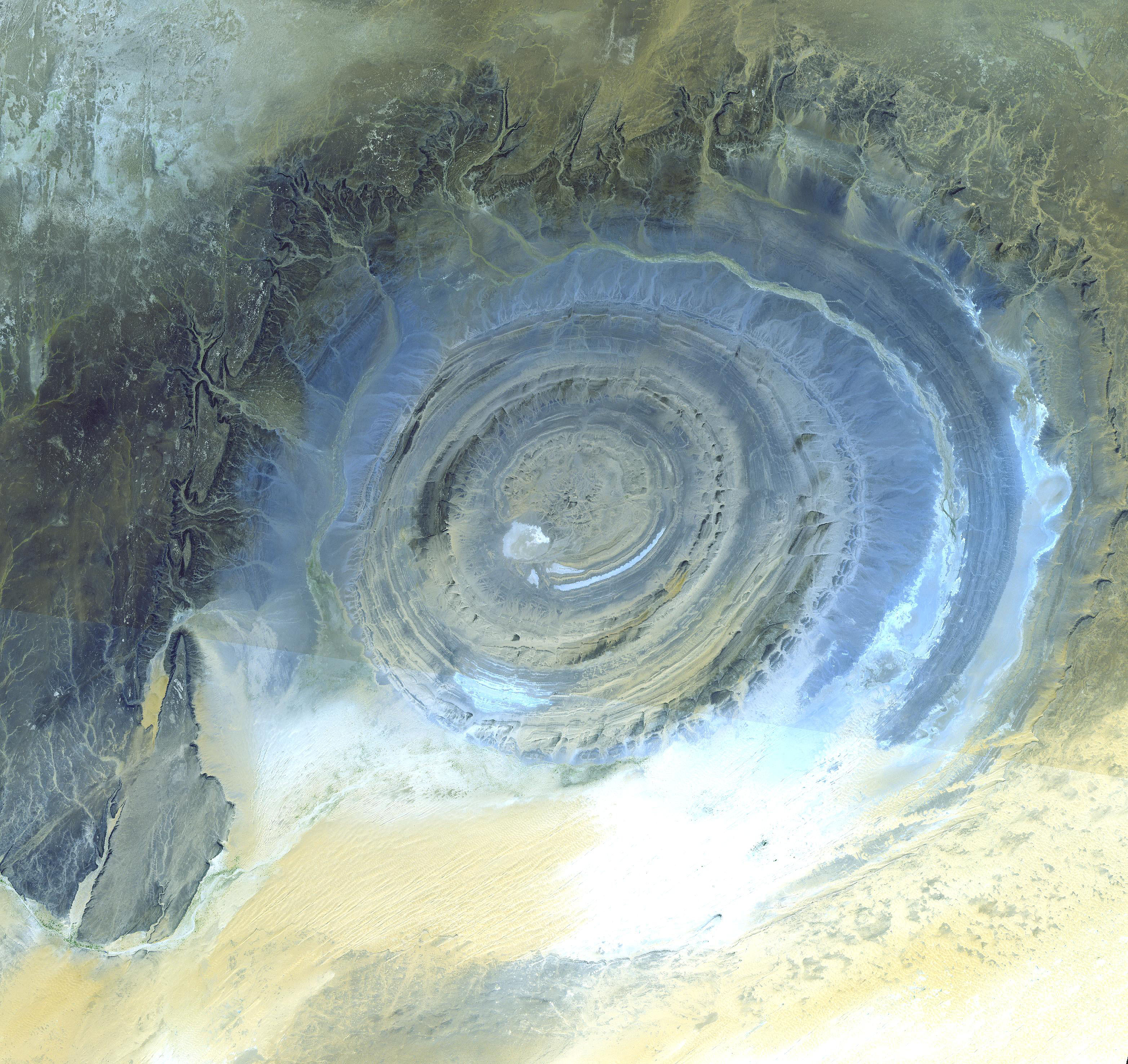
Guelb er Richat structure. With a diameter of almost 50 kilometers (31 mi), it has become a landmark for Space Shuttle crews. Initially interpreted as a meteorite impact structure because of its high degree of circularity, it is now thought to be merely a symmetrical uplift (circular anticline) that has been laid bare by erosion. Paleozoic quartzites form the resistant beds outlining the structure.

Mauritania has four ecological zones: the Saharan Zone, the Sahelian Zone, the Senegal River Valley, and the Coastal Zone. Although the zones are markedly different from one another, no natural features clearly delineate the boundaries between them. Sand, varying in color and composition, covers 40 percent of the surface of the country, forming dunes that appear in all zones except the Senegal River Valley. Fixed sand dunes are composed of coarse, fawn-colored sand, while shifting ("mobile") dunes consist of fine, dustlike, reddish-colored sands that can be carried by the wind. Plateaus generally are covered with heavier blue, gray, and black sands that form a crusty surface over layers of soft, loose sand.

==== Saharan zone ====
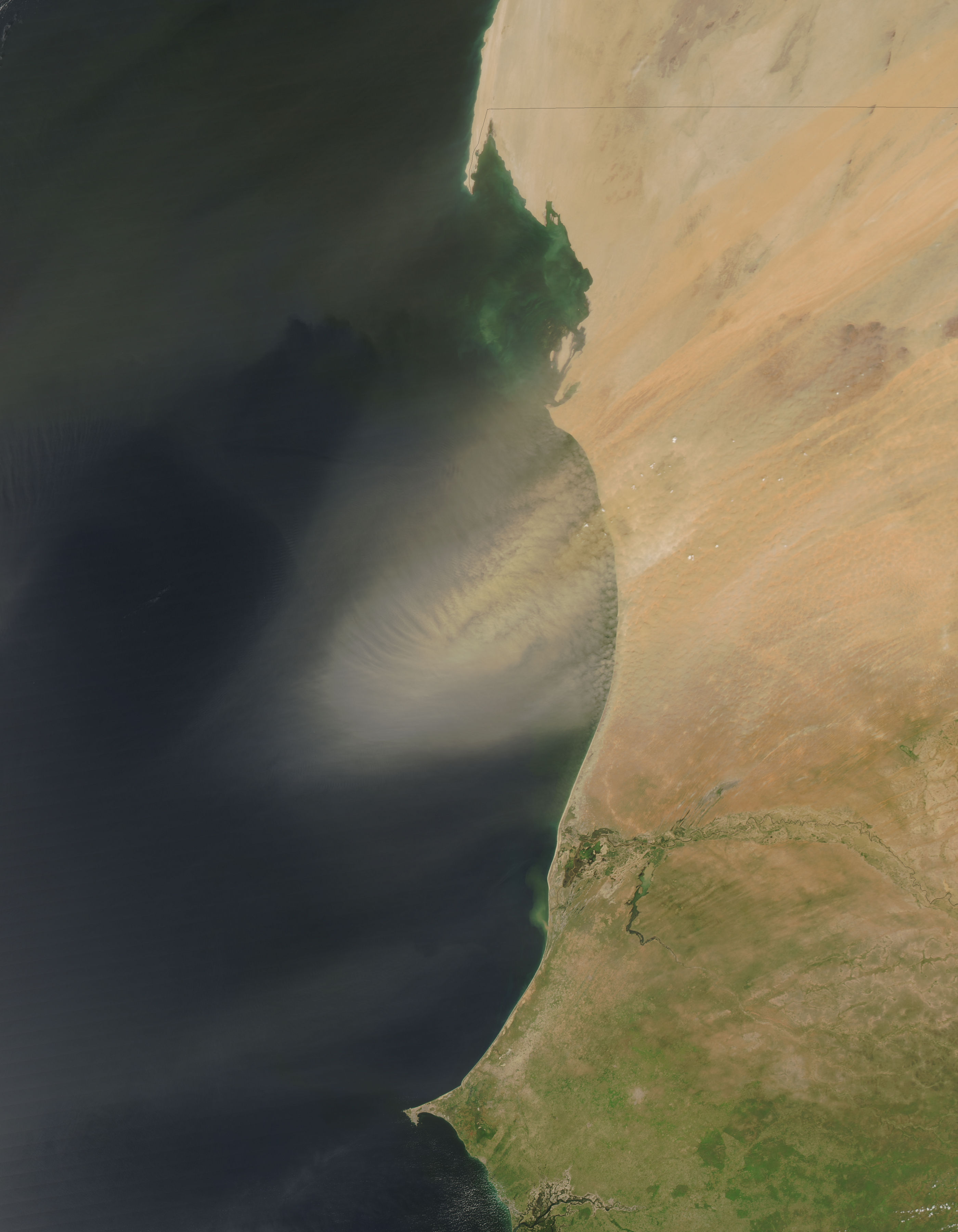
Dust plume off Mauritania.

The Saharan Zone makes up the northern two-thirds of the country. Its southern boundary corresponds to the isohyet (a line on the Earth's surface along which the rainfall is the same) that represents annual precipitation of 150 millimetres (5.9 in). Rain usually falls during the hivernage, which lasts from July to September. Often, isolated storms drop large amounts of water in short periods of time. A year, or even several years, may pass without any rain in some locations.

Diurnal variations in temperature in the Saharan Zone may be extreme, although annual variations are minimal. During December and January, temperatures range from an early morning low of 0 °C (32 °F) to a midafternoon high of 38 °C (100.4 °F). During May, June, and July, temperatures range from 16 °C (60.8 °F) in the morning to more than 49 °C (120.2 °F) by afternoon. Throughout the year, the harmattan often causes blinding sandstorms.

The administrative regions (formerly called cercles) of Tiris Zemmour in the north, Adrar in the center, and northern Hodh ech Chargui in the east, which make up most of the Saharan Zone, are vast empty stretches of dunes alternating with granite outcroppings. After a rain, or in the presence of a well, these outcroppings may support vegetation. In the populated Adrar and Tagant plateaus, springs and wells provide water for pasturage and some agriculture. In the western portion of the Saharan Zone, extending toward Nouakchott, rows of sand dunes are aligned from northeast to southwest in ridges from two to twenty kilometres wide. Between these ridges are depressions filled with limestone and clayey sand capable of supporting vegetation after a rain. Dunes in the far north shift with the wind more than those in the south.

The Saharan Zone has little vegetation. Some mountainous areas with a water source support small-leafed and spiny plants and scrub grasses suitable for camels. Because seeds of desert plants can remain dormant for many years, dunes often sprout sparse vegetation after a rain. In depressions between dunes, where the water is nearer the surface, some flora—including acacias, soapberry trees, capers, and swallowwort—may be found. Saline areas have a particular kind of vegetation, mainly chenopods, which are adapted to high salt concentrations in the soil. Cultivation is limited to oases, where date palms are used to shade other crops from the sun.

Climate data for Zouerat
Month	Jan	Feb	Mar	Apr	May	Jun	Jul	Aug	Sep	Oct	Nov	Dec	Year
Record high °C (°F)	34 (93)	34 (93)	37 (99)	40 (104)	43 (109)	46 (115)	47 (117)	46 (115)	44 (111)	41 (106)	38 (100)	36 (97)	47 (117)
Mean daily maximum °C (°F)	22 (72)	25 (77)	26 (79)	31 (88)	33 (91)	36 (97)	40 (104)	40 (104)	37 (99)	32 (90)	27 (81)	23 (73)	31 (88)
Mean daily minimum °C (°F)	12 (54)	15 (59)	16 (61)	18 (64)	20 (68)	23 (73)	26 (79)	27 (81)	26 (79)	22 (72)	18 (64)	14 (57)	20 (68)
Record low °C (°F)	6 (43)	8 (46)	10 (50)	10 (50)	12 (54)	15 (59)	16 (61)	18 (64)	17 (63)	12 (54)	10 (50)	6 (43)	6 (43)
Average precipitation mm (inches)	4 (0.2)	2 (0.1)	2 (0.1)	1 (0.0)	1 (0.0)	2 (0.1)	3 (0.1)	8 (0.3)	21 (0.8)	5 (0.2)	4 (0.2)	3 (0.1)	56 (2.2)
Source: Weatherbase

Climate data for Atar
Month	Jan	Feb	Mar	Apr	May	Jun	Jul	Aug	Sep	Oct	Nov	Dec	Year
Mean daily maximum °C (°F)	28.0 (82.4)	31.0 (87.8)	33.0 (91.4)	36.0 (96.8)	40.0 (104.0)	43.0 (109.4)	44.0 (111.2)	44.0 (111.2)	42.0 (107.6)	38.0 (100.4)	33.0 (91.4)	29.0 (84.2)	36.8 (98.2)
Daily mean °C (°F)	21.0 (69.8)	24.0 (75.2)	26.5 (79.7)	29.5 (85.1)	33.0 (91.4)	35.5 (95.9)	36.5 (97.7)	36.5 (97.7)	35.0 (95.0)	32.0 (89.6)	27.0 (80.6)	22.5 (72.5)	29.9 (85.9)
Mean daily minimum °C (°F)	14.0 (57.2)	17.0 (62.6)	20.0 (68.0)	23.0 (73.4)	26.0 (78.8)	28.0 (82.4)	29.0 (84.2)	29.0 (84.2)	28.0 (82.4)	26.0 (78.8)	21.0 (69.8)	16.0 (60.8)	23.1 (73.6)
Average precipitation mm (inches)	1 (0.0)	1 (0.0)	1 (0.0)	0 (0)	1 (0.0)	1 (0.0)	2 (0.1)	11 (0.4)	11 (0.4)	3 (0.1)	0 (0)	1 (0.0)	33 (1)
Average rainy days	0.3	0.2	0.1	0.1	0.2	0.4	1.1	2.3	2.0	0.6	0.3	0.2	7.8
Mean monthly sunshine hours	276.0	264.0	322.0	325.0	341.0	325.0	317.0	303.0	264.0	265.0	273.0	267.0	3,542
Source 1: Climate Atar - meteoblue
Source 2: Étude méthodologique pour l'utilisation des données climatologiques de l'Afrique tropicale (French document for sunshine hours only)

==== Sahelian zone ====
The Sahelian Zone extends south of the Saharan Zone to within approximately 30 kilometres of the Senegal River. It forms an east–west belt with its axis running from Boutilimit through 'Ayoûn el 'Atroûs to Néma, including the Aoukar basin. The area is mostly made up of steppes and savanna grasslands. Herds of cattle, sheep, and goats move across this zone in search of pasturage.

The hivernage begins earlier in the Sahelian Zone than in the Saharan Zone, often lasting from June until October. Because farmers and herders depend on annual rains, a delay of one month in the beginning of the rainy season can cause large losses and lead to mass migrations from Hodh ech Chargui and Hodh el Gharbi into Mali. Although temperature extremes are narrower than in the Saharan Zone, daily variations range from 16 to 21 °C (60.8 to 69.8 °F). The harmattan is the prevailing wind.

In the northern Sahel, dunes are covered with scrub grasses and spiny acacia trees. Farther south, greater rainfall permits denser vegetation. Sands begin to give way to clay. Large date palm plantations are found on the Tagant Plateau, and savanna grasses, brushwood, balsam, and spurge cover fixed dunes. Occasional baobab trees dot the flat savanna grasslands of the southern Sahel. Forest areas contain palm trees and baobabs. Vast forests of gum-bearing acacia grow in Trarza and Brakna regions. Farther south, particularly in Assaba and the northern portion of Guidimaka regions, rainfall is high enough to support forms of sedentary agriculture.

Climate data for Néma (altitude 269 metres or 883 feet)
Month	Jan	Feb	Mar	Apr	May	Jun	Jul	Aug	Sep	Oct	Nov	Dec	Year
Mean daily maximum °C (°F)	30.0 (86.0)	33.0 (91.4)	37.0 (98.6)	40.0 (104.0)	42.0 (107.6)	42.0 (107.6)	38.0 (100.4)	35.0 (95.0)	37.0 (98.6)	39.0 (102.2)	36.0 (96.8)	31.0 (87.8)	36.7 (98.1)
Daily mean °C (°F)	23.0 (73.4)	26.2 (79.2)	30.4 (86.7)	33.3 (91.9)	37.0 (98.6)	35.8 (96.4)	33.4 (92.1)	31.8 (89.2)	32.3 (90.1)	33.7 (92.7)	29.2 (84.6)	23.5 (74.3)	30.7 (87.3)
Mean daily minimum °C (°F)	17.0 (62.6)	19.0 (66.2)	23.0 (73.4)	26.0 (78.8)	29.0 (84.2)	28.0 (82.4)	26.0 (78.8)	24.0 (75.2)	25.0 (77.0)	26.0 (78.8)	23.0 (73.4)	18.0 (64.4)	23.7 (74.7)
Average rainfall mm (inches)	1 (0.0)	1 (0.0)	1 (0.0)	4 (0.2)	9 (0.4)	27 (1.1)	62 (2.4)	105 (4.1)	55 (2.2)	12 (0.5)	1 (0.0)	1 (0.0)	279 (10.9)
Average relative humidity (%)	18	16	14	14	22	39	58	68	59	30	20	22	32
Source: Arab Meteorology Book

Climate data for Kiffa, Mauritania
Month	Jan	Feb	Mar	Apr	May	Jun	Jul	Aug	Sep	Oct	Nov	Dec	Year
Record high °C (°F)	40 (104)	46 (115)	45 (113)	46 (115)	47 (117)	48 (118)	46 (115)	44 (111)	43 (109)	42 (108)	41 (106)	38 (100)	48 (118)
Mean daily maximum °C (°F)	28 (82)	32 (90)	35 (95)	39 (102)	41 (106)	41 (106)	37 (99)	36 (97)	36 (97)	37 (99)	34 (93)	30 (86)	36 (97)
Daily mean °C (°F)	23 (73)	26 (79)	28 (82)	32 (90)	35 (95)	36 (97)	33 (91)	32 (90)	32 (90)	32 (90)	28 (82)	23 (73)	30 (86)
Mean daily minimum °C (°F)	17 (63)	18 (64)	22 (72)	26 (79)	29 (84)	30 (86)	28 (82)	27 (81)	27 (81)	26 (79)	21 (70)	17 (63)	24 (75)
Record low °C (°F)	5 (41)	11 (52)	8 (46)	11 (52)	12 (54)	19 (66)	21 (70)	20 (68)	21 (70)	16 (61)	10 (50)	2 (36)	2 (36)
Average rainfall mm (inches)	1 (0.0)	1 (0.0)	0 (0)	0 (0)	2 (0.1)	22 (0.9)	72 (2.8)	120 (4.7)	73 (2.9)	15 (0.6)	2 (0.1)	2 (0.1)	310 (12.2)
Average rainy days	1	1	0	0	1	1	2	3	2	1	1	1	13
Source: Weatherbase

==== Senegal River Valley ====
The Senegal River Valley, sometimes known as the Chemama or the pre-Sahel, is a narrow belt of land that extends north of the Senegal River. Before the droughts of the 1960s, 1970s, and 1980s, the belt ranged from 16 to 30 kilometres (10 to 19 mi) north of the river. By the late 1980s, desertification had reached the northern bank of the river in some parts of the valley. The valley is wider in Guidimaka Region and is completely dominated by the seasonal cycle of the river. Almost all of the valley's economically active population engages in sedentary agriculture or fishing along the Senegal River and its main tributaries—the Karakoro, the Gorgol, and the Garfa. This area supplies most of the country's agricultural production.

The climate of the Senegal River Valley contrasts with that of the Saharan and Sahelian zones. Rainfall is higher than in other regions, ranging from 400 to 600 millimetres (15.7 to 23.6 in) annually, usually between May and September. This rainfall, combined with annual flooding of the river, provides the basis for agriculture. Temperatures are cooler and subject to less annual and diurnal variation than in other regions.

The Senegal is the only permanent river between southern Morocco and central Senegal. From its source in Guinea, it flows north and west 2,500 kilometres (1,553 mi), reaching the Atlantic Ocean at Saint Louis, Senegal. From its mouth, the river is navigable as far as Kayes, Mali, during the rainy season and Podor, Senegal, during the rest of the year. Heavy rains, beginning in April in Guinea and May and June in Senegal and Mali, bring annual floods. These floods cover the entire valley up to a width of 25 to 35 kilometres (16 to 22 mi), filling numerous lakes and sloughs (marigots) that empty back into the river during the dry season. A notable example of these is Lake R'Kiz. When the waters recede from the bottomlands, planting begins.

The Senegal River Valley, with its rich alluvial and clayey soil, is comparatively abundant in flora. Moreover, higher rainfall, irrigation, and abundant side channels and sloughs tend to produce a lush, near-tropical vegetation, with baobab and gonakie trees and abundant rich grasses. Ddounm and barussus palms are also found here. Much of the flood plain is cultivated.

Climate data for Rosso
Month	Jan	Feb	Mar	Apr	May	Jun	Jul	Aug	Sep	Oct	Nov	Dec	Year
Record high °C (°F)	37 (99)	42 (108)	43 (109)	45 (113)	45 (113)	45 (113)	45 (113)	43 (109)	42 (108)	45 (113)	42 (108)	40 (104)	45 (113)
Mean daily maximum °C (°F)	29 (84)	32 (90)	33 (91)	36 (97)	37 (99)	36 (97)	34 (93)	34 (93)	35 (95)	36 (97)	33 (91)	30 (86)	34 (93)
Daily mean °C (°F)	23 (73)	26 (79)	27 (81)	28 (82)	30 (86)	31 (88)	30 (86)	30 (86)	30 (86)	31 (88)	25 (77)	25 (77)	28 (82)
Mean daily minimum °C (°F)	17 (63)	19 (66)	20 (68)	21 (70)	23 (73)	25 (77)	25 (77)	26 (79)	26 (79)	25 (77)	22 (72)	18 (64)	22 (72)
Record low °C (°F)	8 (46)	11 (52)	11 (52)	11 (52)	12 (54)	13 (55)	20 (68)	22 (72)	19 (66)	16 (61)	11 (52)	7 (45)	7 (45)
Average precipitation days	1	1	0	0	0	0	2	4	3	1	0	1	13
Source: Weatherbase

Climate data for Boghe
Month	Jan	Feb	Mar	Apr	May	Jun	Jul	Aug	Sep	Oct	Nov	Dec	Year
Mean daily maximum °C (°F)	31.4 (88.5)	33.6 (92.5)	36.3 (97.3)	39.0 (102.2)	40.7 (105.3)	40.8 (105.4)	38.2 (100.8)	36.5 (97.7)	37.3 (99.1)	38.3 (100.9)	36.0 (96.8)	31.3 (88.3)	36.6 (97.9)
Mean daily minimum °C (°F)	14.5 (58.1)	16.2 (61.2)	19.6 (67.3)	21.6 (70.9)	24.1 (75.4)	25.4 (77.7)	25.7 (78.3)	25.9 (78.6)	25.7 (78.3)	23.3 (73.9)	19.6 (67.3)	16.0 (60.8)	21.5 (70.6)
Average precipitation mm (inches)	1 (0.0)	1 (0.0)	0 (0)	0 (0)	0 (0)	11 (0.4)	56 (2.2)	91 (3.6)	68 (2.7)	16 (0.6)	0 (0)	0 (0)	244 (9.6)
Source: Climate-Data.org, Climate data

==== Coastal zone ====
The Coastal Zone, or Sub-Canarian Zone, extends the length of the approximately 754-kilometre (469 mi) long Atlantic coast. Prevailing oceanic trade winds from the Canary Islands modify the influence of the harmattan, producing a humid but temperate climate. Rainfall here is minimal; in Nouadhibou it averages 30 mm annually and occurs between July and September. Temperatures are moderate, varying from mean maximums of 28 and 32 °C (82.4 and 89.6 °F) for Nouadhibou and Nouakchott, respectively, to mean minimums of 16 and 19 °C (60.8 and 66.2 °F).

Battering surf and shifting sand banks characterize the entire length of the shoreline. The Ras Nouadhibou (formerly known as Cap Blanc) peninsula, which forms Dakhlet Nouadhibou (formerly Lévrier Bay) to the east, is 50 kilometres (31 mi) long and 13 km wide. The peninsula is administratively divided between Western Sahara and Mauritania, with the Mauritanian port and railhead of Nouadhibou located on the eastern shore. Dakhlet Nouadhibou, one of the largest natural harbours on the west coast of Africa, is 43 kilometres (27 mi) long and 32 kilometres (20 mi) wide at its broadest point. Fifty kilometres southeast of Ras Nouadhibou is Arguin. In 1455 the first Portuguese installation south of Cape Bojador (in the present-day Western Sahara) was established at Arguin. Farther south is the coastline's only significant promontory, 7-metre (23 ft)-high Cape Timiris. From this cape to the marshy area around the mouth of the Senegal River, the coast is regular and marked only by an occasional high dune.

On coastal dunes vegetation is rare. At the foot of ridges, however, large tamarisk bushes, dwarf acacias, and swallowworts may be found. Some high grass, mixed with balsam, spurge, and spiny shrubs, grows in the central region. The north has little vegetation.

A recent global remote sensing analysis suggested that there were 494 km^{2} of tidal flats in Mauritania, making it the 48th ranked country in terms of tidal flat area.

Climate data for Nouadhibou (extremes 1906–present)
Month	Jan	Feb	Mar	Apr	May	Jun	Jul	Aug	Sep	Oct	Nov	Dec	Year
Record high °C (°F)	33.6 (92.5)	36.0 (96.8)	38.0 (100.4)	38.5 (101.3)	39.4 (102.9)	41.0 (105.8)	39.7 (103.5)	39.4 (102.9)	41.3 (106.3)	40.5 (104.9)	37.4 (99.3)	34.9 (94.8)	41.3 (106.3)
Mean daily maximum °C (°F)	24.3 (75.7)	25.4 (77.7)	27.0 (80.6)	26.2 (79.2)	26.5 (79.7)	27.9 (82.2)	27.2 (81.0)	28.2 (82.8)	30.5 (86.9)	29.9 (85.8)	27.3 (81.1)	24.7 (76.5)	27.1 (80.8)
Daily mean °C (°F)	18.3 (64.9)	19.2 (66.6)	20.1 (68.2)	19.9 (67.8)	20.4 (68.7)	22.8 (73.0)	22.4 (72.3)	23.5 (74.3)	24.6 (76.3)	23.3 (73.9)	21.2 (70.2)	19.2 (66.6)	21.3 (70.3)
Mean daily minimum °C (°F)	13.6 (56.5)	14.2 (57.6)	14.8 (58.6)	15.1 (59.2)	16.1 (61.0)	17.4 (63.3)	18.8 (65.8)	19.9 (67.8)	20.3 (68.5)	19.0 (66.2)	16.8 (62.2)	14.5 (58.1)	16.7 (62.1)
Record low °C (°F)	4.0 (39.2)	9.5 (49.1)	10.0 (50.0)	8.9 (48.0)	9.8 (49.6)	10.5 (50.9)	10.8 (51.4)	12.8 (55.0)	13.4 (56.1)	10.0 (50.0)	10.0 (50.0)	9.0 (48.2)	4.0 (39.2)
Average rainfall mm (inches)	2 (0.1)	3 (0.1)	2 (0.1)	1 (0.0)	1 (0.0)	1 (0.0)	1 (0.0)	3 (0.1)	5 (0.2)	3 (0.1)	2 (0.1)	1 (0.0)	23 (0.9)
Average rainy days (≥ 1.0 mm)	0.3	0.4	0.3	0.3	0.1	0.1	0.2	0.4	0.7	0.2	0.2	0.1	3.1
Average relative humidity (%)	63	68	69	72	73	74	79	78	73	72	69	66	71
Mean monthly sunshine hours	248.0	237.3	279.0	285.0	310.0	276.0	260.4	272.8	246.0	254.2	243.0	244.9	3,156.6
Mean daily sunshine hours	8.0	8.4	9.0	9.5	10.0	9.2	8.4	8.8	8.2	8.2	8.1	7.9	8.6
Source 1: Deutscher Wetterdienst
Source 2: Meteo Climat (record highs and lows)

Climate data for Nouakchott (1981–2010, extremes 1934–2012)
Month	Jan	Feb	Mar	Apr	May	Jun	Jul	Aug	Sep	Oct	Nov	Dec	Year
Record high °C (°F)	39.9 (103.8)	41.7 (107.1)	44.0 (111.2)	47.5 (117.5)	47.0 (116.6)	47.2 (117.0)	47.5 (117.5)	45.1 (113.2)	45.5 (113.9)	44.5 (112.1)	42.3 (108.1)	39.6 (103.3)	47.5 (117.5)
Mean daily maximum °C (°F)	29.1 (84.4)	30.8 (87.4)	33.5 (92.3)	34.8 (94.6)	34.3 (93.7)	34.7 (94.5)	32.4 (90.3)	33.0 (91.4)	36.1 (97.0)	36.7 (98.1)	34.0 (93.2)	31.0 (87.8)	33.4 (92.1)
Daily mean °C (°F)	21.5 (70.7)	23.0 (73.4)	24.2 (75.6)	24.3 (75.7)	25.8 (78.4)	26.7 (80.1)	27.3 (81.1)	28.4 (83.1)	29.6 (85.3)	28.8 (83.8)	25.8 (78.4)	22.8 (73.0)	25.7 (78.3)
Mean daily minimum °C (°F)	14.5 (58.1)	16.4 (61.5)	18.2 (64.8)	19.1 (66.4)	20.7 (69.3)	22.8 (73.0)	24.3 (75.7)	25.4 (77.7)	25.8 (78.4)	23.8 (74.8)	19.7 (67.5)	16.9 (62.4)	20.6 (69.1)
Record low °C (°F)	3.9 (39.0)	7.0 (44.6)	5.0 (41.0)	10.0 (50.0)	13.0 (55.4)	15.7 (60.3)	15.0 (59.0)	16.1 (61.0)	17.0 (62.6)	13.0 (55.4)	9.3 (48.7)	5.0 (41.0)	3.9 (39.0)
Average precipitation mm (inches)	0.7 (0.03)	1.5 (0.06)	0.2 (0.01)	0.1 (0.00)	0.3 (0.01)	1.9 (0.07)	6.3 (0.25)	36.8 (1.45)	36.3 (1.43)	6.3 (0.25)	2.0 (0.08)	2.8 (0.11)	95.2 (3.75)
Average precipitation days (≥ 1.0 mm)	0.2	0.3	0.0	0.0	0.0	0.3	0.8	2.6	3.0	0.7	0.2	0.3	8.3
Average relative humidity (%)	36	39	43	49	54	60	70	72	69	55	44	35	52
Mean monthly sunshine hours	232.5	220.4	260.4	270.0	282.1	240.0	238.7	254.2	228.0	260.4	243.0	217.0	2,946.7
Mean daily sunshine hours	7.5	7.8	8.4	9.0	9.1	8.0	7.7	8.2	7.6	8.4	8.1	7.0	8.1
Source: Deutscher Wetterdienst

== Expansion of the desert ==
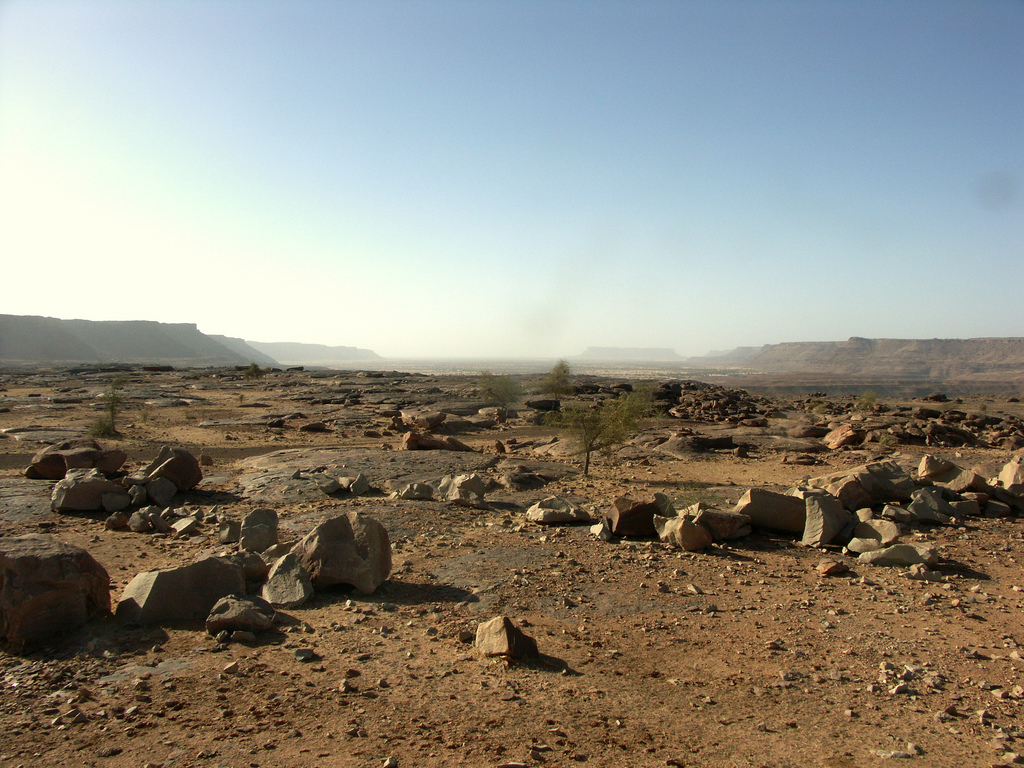
The Passe de Djouk, near Guerou; an increasingly arid area

The climate has altered drastically since the onset of the prolonged drought in the 1960s, part of a recurrent pattern of wet and dry cycles common to Sahelian Africa. Experts agree, however, that overgrazing, deforestation, denuding of ground cover around wells, poor farming methods, and overpopulation have aggravated the drought. In Mauritania the isohyet indicating annual rainfall of 150 millimetres—considered the minimum for pastoralism—has shifted southward about 100 kilometres to a point well south of Nouakchott. During the 1980s, the desert was advancing southward at an estimated rate of six kilometres a year. Each major climatic zone had shifted southward, and in some cases near-desert conditions had reached the banks of the Senegal River.

By the late 1980s, desertification had fundamentally altered agro-pastoral and human settlement patterns. Loss of ground cover in the Sahelian Zone had driven animals and people southward in search of food and water and had given rise to new fields of sand dunes. The advancing dunes threatened to engulf wells, villages, and roads; they had even invaded Nouakchott on their march to the sea. The government secured international help to stabilize the dune field around Nouakchott and planted 250,000 palm trees to create a barrier against the encroaching desert. To further combat desiccation, the government constructed dams on the Senegal River and its tributaries to increase the amount of cultivable land.

== Area and boundaries ==
=== Area ===
total: 1,030,700 km^{2} (397,960 sq mi)
land: 1,030,700 km^{2} (397,960 sq mi)
water: 0 km^{2} (0 sq mi)

=== Land boundaries ===
total: 5,074 kilometres (3,153 mi)

border countries: Algeria 463 kilometres (288 mi), Mali 2,237 kilometres (1,390 mi), Senegal 813 kilometres (505 mi), Western Sahara 1,561 kilometres (970 mi)

=== Coastline ===
754 kilometres (469 mi; 407 nmi)

=== Maritime claims ===
territorial sea: 12 nmi (22.2 km; 13.8 mi) contiguous zone: 24 nmi (44.4 km; 27.6 mi)
continental shelf: 200 nmi (370.4 km; 230.2 mi) or to the edge of the continental margin
exclusive economic zone: 200 nmi (370.4 km; 230.2 mi)

== Elevation extremes ==
lowest point: Sebkha de Ndrhamcha −5 metres (−16 ft)
highest point: Kediet ej Jill 915 metres (3,002 ft)

== Resources and Land use ==
=== Natural resources ===
Iron ore, gypsum, copper, phosphate, diamonds, gold, oil, fish

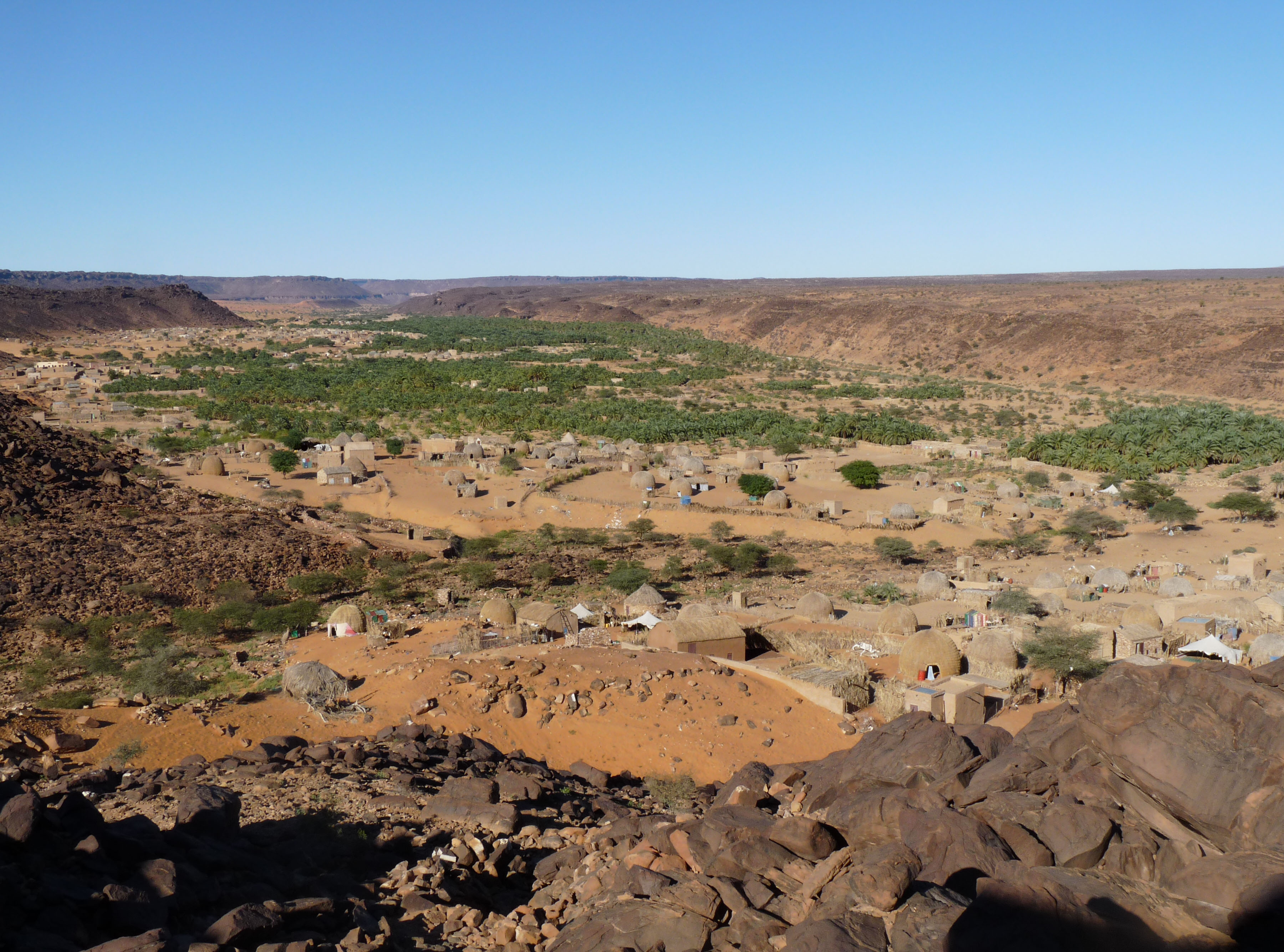
Oasis of Mhaïreth

=== Land use ===
arable land: 0.44%
permanent crops: 0.01%
other: 99.55% (2011)

=== Irrigated land ===
450.1 km^{2} (2004)

=== Total renewable water resources ===
11.4 km^{3}

== Environmental concerns ==
=== Natural hazards ===
Hot, dry, dust/sand-laden sirocco wind blows primarily in March and April; periodic droughts

=== Environment – current issues ===
Overgrazing, deforestation, and soil erosion aggravated by drought are contributing to desertification; very limited natural fresh water resources away from the Senegal which is the only perennial river; locust infestation

=== Environment – international agreements ===
party to: Biodiversity, Climate Change, Climate Change-Kyoto Protocol, Desertification, Endangered Species, Hazardous Wastes, Law of the Sea, Ozone Layer Protection, Ship Pollution, Wetlands, Whaling
signed, but not ratified: none of the selected agreements

== Cities ==
The population is mainly concentrated in the cities of Nouakchott and Nouadhibou and along the Senegal River at the southern border of the country.

== Extreme points ==
This is a list of the extreme points of Mauritania, the points that are farther north, south, east or west than any other location.

- Northernmost point – the tripoint with Algeria and Western Sahara, Tiris Zemmour Region
- Easternmost point – the tripoint with Algeria and Mali, Tiris Zemmour Region
- Southernmost point – the confluence of the Senegal River and the Karakoro River on the border with Mali, Guidimaka Region
- Westernmost point – unnamed location on the border with Western Sahara on the Ras Nouadhibou, peninsula, Dakhlet Nouadhibou Region
