= Tagant region =

Region of Mauritania

Tagant ولاية تكانت
- Region of Mauritania
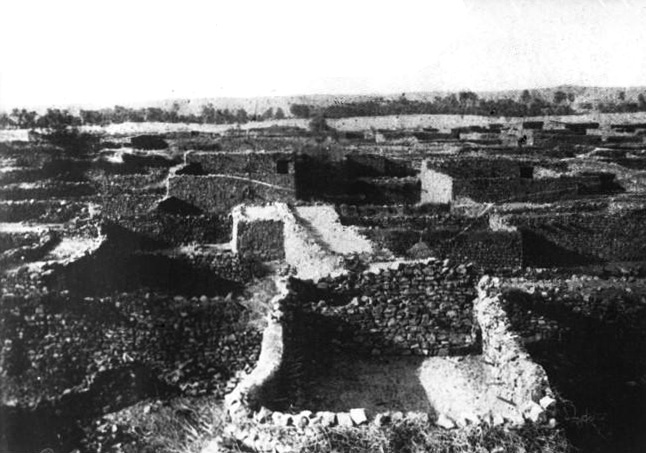

- Coordinates: 18°42′N 10°12′W
- Country: Mauritania
- Departments: 3: Moudjeria; Tichit; Tidjikja
- Capital: Tidjikdja

Area
  - Total: 95,200 km^{2} (36,800 sq mi)

Population (2023 census)
  - Total: 114,760
  - Density: 1.21/km^{2} (3.12/sq mi)
- Time zone: UTC+0
  - Summer (DST): not observed
- HDI (2017): 0.517 low

Tagant (Arabic: ولاية تكانت, romanized: Wilāyat Tagānit) is a region in south-central Mauritania named for the Tagant Plateau. Its capital is Tidjikdja. Other major cities/towns include Tichit and Rachid, Nbeika. The region borders the Mauritanian regions of Adrar to the north, Hodh Ech Chargui to the east, Hodh El Gharbi and Assaba to the south and Brakna to the west. The Aoukar basin, which formerly gave name to the greater region, is located in the southern part of Tagant.

As of 2013, the population of the region was 80,962, compared to 88,736 in 2011. There were 47.09 per cent females and 52.91 per cent males. As of 2008, the activity rate was 51.00 and economic dependency ratio was 0.81. As of 2008, the literacy rate for people aged 15 years and over was 58.10.

== Geography ==
Mauritania is mostly covered with desert, with only its western regions around the coast of Atlantic Ocean having some vegetation. There are some oasis in the desert regions. Since it is a desert, there are large shifting dunes forming temporary ranges. The average elevation is around 460 m (1,510 ft) above the mean sea level. The rainfall in the northern regions closer to the Tropic of Cancer receives around 100 mm (3.9 in) of annual rainfall compared to the southern portions that receives around 660 mm (26 in). The average temperature is 37.8 °C (100.0 °F), while during the night it reaches 0 °C (32 °F).

Due to the geography, the inhabitants historically, have been nomadic. In modern times, people have migrated to urban centres during the drought in the 1970s and the early 1980s. There are a few sedentary cultivators, who are located only in the Southern regions of the country. Research has indicated that the Saharan movement has resulted in reduction of rains in the region from the 1960s, when it received close to 250 mm (9.8 in) of rainfall.

== Demographics ==
As of 2013, the population of the region was 80,962, compared to 88,736 in 2011. There were 47.09 per cent females and 52.91 per cent males. As of 2008, the Couples with children was 53.10 and Couples without children was 2.00. The proportion with extended family was 15.80 per cent and extended single-parent was 11.90 per cent, one-person was 1.30 per cent, and single-parent nuclear was 15.90 per cent.

As of 2008, the rate of household confirming the existence of public telephone in their neighbourhood or village was 38.28, rate of households benefiting from electricity post in their neighbourhood was 0.95 per cent, rate of households benefiting from health center or health post in their neighbourhood was 2.15 per cent, and rate of households benefiting from sanitary services was 0.01 per cent.

== Economy ==
As of 2008, the activity rate was 51.00 and economic dependency ratio was 0.81. The fraction of people working in government was 8.90 per cent, individual / household private was 21.10 per cent, other was 67.80 per cent, para public was 1.40 per cent, and private enterprise was 0.80 per cent. The Grand Total as of 2008 was 671.71. As of 2013, the coverage rate of DPT3 Children From 0 to 11 Months in the region was 59.80 per cent, BGC vaccination was 59.10 and polio vaccination coverage was 59.60. As of 2007, the number of tourist establishments in the region was 3. As of 2008, the literacy rate for people aged 15 years and over was 58.10. The net enrolment ratio of girls for secondary level was 14.60 per cent, net enrolment ratio of boys for secondary level was 14.10 per cent, and Total net enrolment ratio at secondary level was 14.40 per cent.

== Departments ==
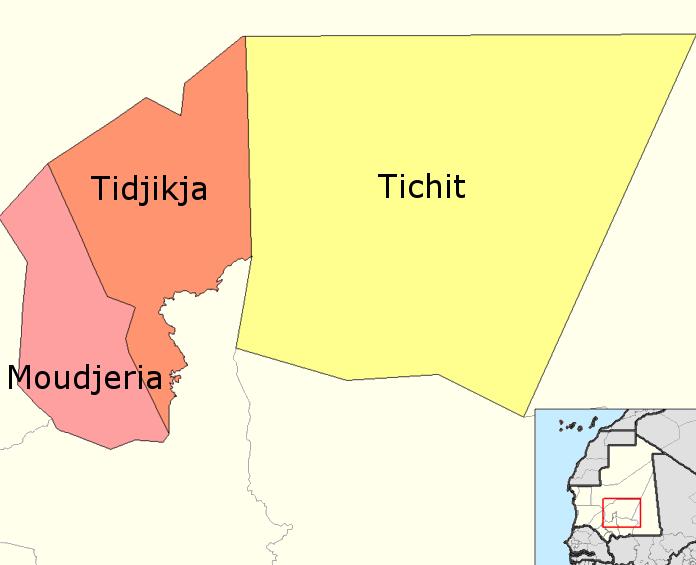
Departments of Tagant.

Tagant is divided into 3 departments, namely, Moudjeria, Tichit and Tidjikja. The local administration is adopted from French local administration framework with a Ministry of Internal Control governing the local bodies. The original administration was held by Governors of each district, but after the municipal elections in 1994, the powers has been decentralized from the district bodies. Mauritania has been divided into 13 wilayas (regions), including the Nouakchott Capital District. The smallest administrative division in the country is the commune and the country has 216 of them. A group of communes form a moughataa (department) and the group of moughataa form a district. There are total of 53 moughataa for the 13 districts in the country. The executive power of the district is vested on a district chief, while it is on hakem for moughataa. Out of the 216 communes, 53 classified as urban and rest 163 are rural.

The communes are responsible for overseeing and coordinating development activities and are financed by the state. The Local Governments have their own legal jurisdiction, financial autonomy, an annual budget, staff, and an office. The elections for the local government are conducted every five years along with Regional and Parliamentary elections. On account of the political instability, the last elections were held in 2023.

== See also ==
- Departments of Mauritania
- Geography of Mauritania
- Regions of Mauritania
