= Zouérat (department) =

- Department
- Location within Mauritania
- Coordinates: 22°44′N 12°28′W
- Country: Mauritania

Area
  - Total: 310.4 sq mi (804.0 km^{2})

Population (2013 census)
  - Total: 44,649
  - Density: 143.8/sq mi (55.53/km^{2})

Zouérat is a department of Tiris Zemmour Region in Mauritania.

== List of municipalities in the department ==
The Zouérat department is made up of following communes:

- Zouérat
