= Bir Moghrein (department) =

- Department
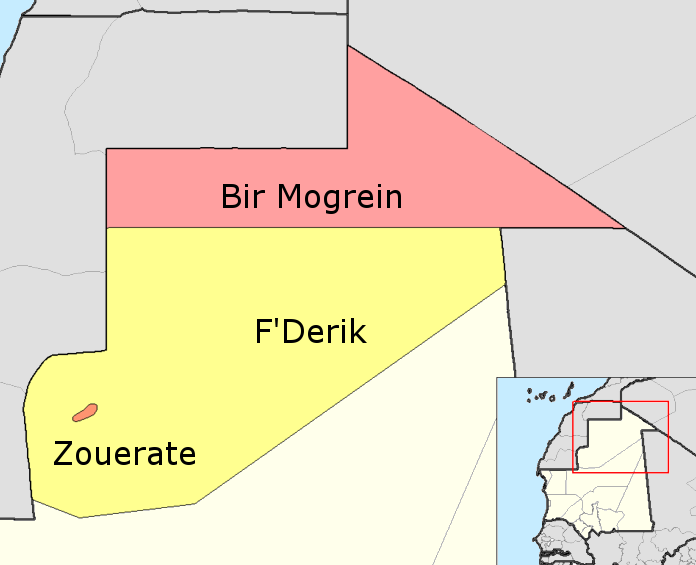

- Location within Mauritania
- Country: Mauritania

Area
  - Total: 86,104 km^{2} (33,245 sq mi)

Population (2013 census)
  - Total: 3,897
  - Density: 0.04526/km^{2} (0.1172/sq mi)

Bir Moghrein is a department of Tiris Zemmour Region in Mauritania. It includes the town of Bir Moghrein.
