= Aleg (department) =

Aleg الاك
- Department
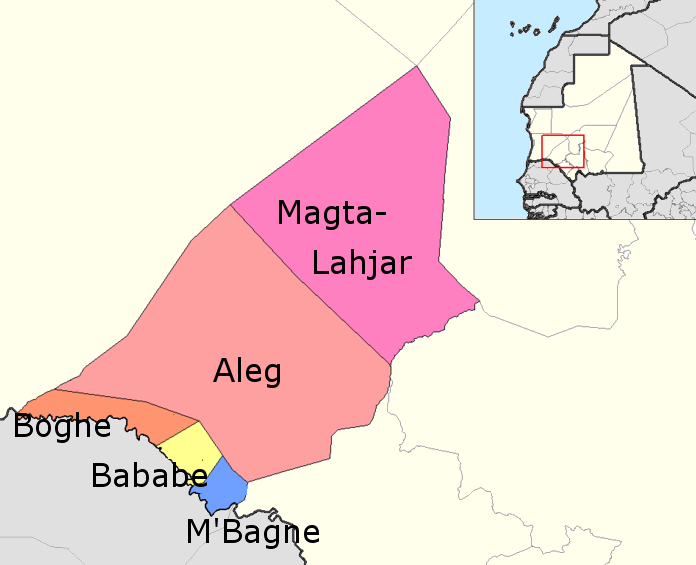

- Location within Mauritania
- Coordinates: 17°3′N 13°55′W
- Country: Mauritania

Area
  - Department: 6,125 sq mi (15,864 km^{2})

Population (2013 census)
  - Department: 101,512
  - Density: 16.573/sq mi (6.3989/km^{2})
  - Urban: 22,250 (22%)
  - Rural: 79,262 (78%)

Aleg is a department of Brakna Region in Mauritania.

== List of municipalities in the department ==
The Aleg department is made up of following municipalities:

- Aghchorguitt
- Aleg
- Bouhdida
- Cheggar
- Djellwar
- Mal.

In 2013, the entire population of the Aleg Department has a total of 101,512 inhabitants (47,693 men and 53,819 women).
