= Aïssata Kane =

Mauritanian politician (1938–2019)

- Kane in 2013

Minister for the Protection of the Family and Social Affairs
- In office August 1975 – 10 July 1978
- President: Mokhtar Ould Daddah

Personal details
- Born: 18 August 1938 Dar El Barka, Mauritania
- Died: 10 August 2019 (aged 80) Nouakchott, Mauritania
- Party: Mauritanian People's Party
- Education: Free University of Brussels (dropped out)

Aïssata Touré Kane (18 August 1938 – 10 August 2019) was a Mauritanian politician and women's rights activist who was the country's first female government minister. She served as Minister for the Protection of the Family and Social Affairs under President Moktar Ould Daddah from 1975 until his government was overthrown in a military coup in 1978.

Kane began campaigning for girls' education in the 1950s and helped establish Mauritania's national women's movement. She held leadership roles in the Mauritanian People's Party and published material addressing women's rights. As minister, she promoted girls' schooling and opposed force-feeding and polygamy. After leaving government, she worked with international organisations and continued campaigning for family-law reform, women's political participation and the elimination of female genital mutilation.

== Early life ==
Aïssata Touré Kane was born on 18 August 1938 in Dar El Barka, in what became Mauritania's Brakna Region. She was born into a Halpulaar family, and her father, Mame N'diack, was the district chief of Tooro. She was among the first three Mauritanian girls to receive a Western-style secondary education; her father supported her attendance at a French-language school in Saint-Louis, Senegal, despite opposition from relatives and local religious leaders to girls receiving a Western education. She attended primary and secondary school there from 1946 to 1957.

Kane attended the Free University of Brussels on a scholarship in 1959 and 1960, but family circumstances prevented her from completing her studies. Her husband, Moctar Touré, was at the time employed in Brussels as a French official working with the European Common Market. The couple returned to Nouakchott after Mauritania had become independent in November 1960, and Kane taught French at secondary school level.

In 1957, Kane formed the Comité pour la fréquentation scolaire féminine (Committee for Female School Attendance) to encourage girls to attend school. Her efforts received criticism from parents in both Mauritania and Senegal, but she defended girls' education as compatible with Islamic law.

== Women's organising and political career ==
Kane recalled that, after returning from Belgium, she campaigned against neocolonialism and supported trade unionism alongside her work for women's rights. In 1961, she was one of the founders of the first formal organisation for women in Mauritania, the Union nationale des femmes de Mauritanie (UNFM; National Union of Mauritanian Women), which had been instigated by Mariem Daddah, who was married to President Moktar Ould Daddah. (Note: According to her later account, she helped establish the Union des femmes de Nouakchott in 1961, which became the UNFM in 1963.) She worked with Mariem Daddah, as well as with teachers and nurses. Kane said that girls' schooling and opposition to force-feeding were the focus of her early campaigns in the 1960s. Kane attended the 1962 Conférence des femmes africaines (Conference of African Women) and later worked for the organisation in Algiers after its headquarters moved there. She worked as a French teacher from 1963 to 1967.

The national women's organisation became the Mouvement national féminin (MNF; National Women's Movement) and was incorporated into the ruling Mauritanian People's Party. The group's areas of focus included nutrition, childcare, literacy and support for women's paid work. Kane joined the leadership of the party's youth wing in 1966 and later chaired its Superior Council for Women. In a 2005 interview, she said that she had trained in journalism alongside male colleagues and also published a monthly bulletin, La Militante, which discussed women's rights. She said that the bulletin appeared for about ten years before she stopped publishing it following the 1978 coup.

In 1969, Kane became secretary of information of the MNF. She was responsible for publishing the women's movement's magazine, Marienou. She also co-wrote Métiers de femmes (Women's Jobs) with Senegalese author Annette Mbaye d'Erneville. She attended meetings of the Women's International Democratic Federation, in Berlin in 1965 and Helsinki in 1968.

== Ministerial career ==
According to the historian Jeremy Rich, Kane's reputation as a "powerful public speaker and a gifted organiser" brought her to the attention of the government. In August 1975, she was appointed Minister for the Protection of the Family and Social Affairs in Daddah's government. She was Mauritania's first female cabinet minister.

As a minister, Kane promoted girls' education and social welfare. She made the payment of family allowances conditional on the presentation of school-attendance certificates, particularly for girls. She also opposed polygamy, and the force-feeding of girls in preparation for marriage. Rich wrote that her efforts to reduce polygamy had limited success.

In a 2005 interview, Kane recalled that her appointment during International Women's Year had renewed her hopes of securing a family code, but that the proposed reforms were not adopted during her tenure. Her ministerial term ended when Daddah's government was overthrown in the military coup of 10 July 1978. Kane was spared imprisonment following the coup, although fellow male ministers were detained. In 2013, she commented that this was "the only time I've been discriminated against as a woman." The military authorities dissolved youth and women's organisations. No other woman was appointed to cabinet level until 1987, when President Maaouya Ould Sid'Ahmed Taya appointed three women.

== Later activism ==
After leaving government, Kane continued her work with women's organisations and international agencies. By 1992, she was president of the Association internationale des femmes francophones (International Association of French-Speaking Women) and secretary-general of the Organisation of African Families. She worked as a consultant for United Nations bodies and other international agencies, and headed the Association for the Protection of the Environment and Children. She also served as the Mauritanian contact for the African Women's Development and Communication Network (FEMNET).

Kane campaigned for a personal status code governing marriage, divorce and child custody, presenting reform as compatible with Islamic law. In a 2005 interview, she described a campaign lasting about 25 years before the code came into effect in 2001. She welcomed provisions requiring women's consent to marriage and financial support following divorce or abandonment, but criticised the code's continued recognition of unilateral repudiation by husbands.

Her son Karass Kane died in a road traffic collision on 24 September 2006, and her husband Seydou Kane died from injuries sustained in the same incident four days later. Rich wrote that following this, Kane "remained committed to her many struggles."

She campaigned against female genital mutilation, calling in 2005 for "all those involved in carrying out the procedure" to face penalties, and for the government to work towards its total eradication. In a 2013 interview, she advocated quotas for women in government appointments and elected office, alongside measures to improve girls' access to education.

== Death and legacy ==
Kane received support from high-ranking government officials during her career, including President Daddah, but some of her attempts at more radical reforms met opposition from religious conservatives. In 2005, Kane was among 1,000 women collectively nominated for the Nobel Peace Prize. A street in Nouakchott was named after her. In June 2018, Kane received the Prix de la Femme pionnière in recognition of her work to advance the status of African women.

Kane died in Nouakchott on 10 August 2019, aged eighty. She was buried in Dar El Barka. Prime Minister Ismail Ould Bedde Ould Cheikh Sidiya and other ministers attended her funeral, alongside religious leaders and representatives of associations. On 6 December 2019, she was posthumously awarded the rank of officer of Mauritania's National Order of Merit, with her son Touré Amadou Tidjane accepting the award on her behalf.

== See also ==
- List of the first female holders of political offices in Africa
- Women in Mauritania
