= List of largest cities by area =

This is a list of the largest municipalities and urban areas in the world by area.

== Cities/municipalities ==
This table shows all cities or municipalities with a total area of at least 50,000 square kilometres (19,305 sq mi). Administrative areas without city/municipality status like districts or prefectures are excluded.

City/municipality	Municipality status	Country	Total area (km^{2})	Population	Population density (per km^{2})
Sermersooq	Municipality	Greenland	575,300	24,148	0.04
Avannaata	Municipality	Greenland	522,700	10,920	0.02
Nagqu	Prefecture-level City	China	353,010	504,838	1.43
Eeyou Istchee Baie-James	Regional Government	Canada	283,123.42	2,638	0.009
Hulunbuir	Prefecture-level City	China	234,545	2,242,875	10
Shigatse	Prefecture-level City	China	178,400	798,153	4
Fderîck	Commune	Mauritania	169,684	11,623	0.06
Jiuquan	Prefecture-level City	China	167,680	1,055,706	6
Altamira	Município	Brazil	159,533	126,279	0.8
Djado	Commune	Niger	156,026	876	0.005
Hami	Prefecture-level City	China	137,263	673,383	5
Reggane	Commune	Algeria	124,711	20,402	0.2
Barcelos	Município	Brazil	122,461	18,834	0.2
Bordj Badji Mokhtar	Commune	Algeria	121,486	16,437	0.1
Iferouane	Commune	Niger	120,288	13,655	0.1
Ouadane	Commune	Mauritania	118,210	3,833	0.03
N'Gourti	Commune	Niger	113,484	51,767	0.5
Chamdo	Prefecture-level City	China	109,790	760,966	7
São Gabriel da Cachoeira	Município	Brazil	109,193	51,795	0.5
Oriximiná	Município	Brazil	107,614	68,294	0.6
In Amguel	Commune	Algeria	101,324	4,208	0.04
Kashgar	Prefecture-level City	China	100,598	4,496,377	45
Qeqqata	Municipality	Greenland	97,000	9,191	0.1
Kalgoorlie–Boulder	City	Australia	95,500	30,991	0.3
Oualata	Commune	Mauritania	93,092	4,782	0.05
Oum El Assel	Commune	Algeria	87,683	3,183	0.04
Bir Moghrein	Commune	Mauritania	87,401	5,126	0.06
Ordos	Prefecture-level City	China	87,097	2,153,638	25
Chifeng	Prefecture-level City	China	87,032	4,035,967	46
Tazrouk	Commune	Algeria	86,366	4,091	0.05
Tapauá	Município	Brazil	84,946	19,599	0.2
Northern Rockies Regional Municipality	Regional municipality	Canada	84,759.31	3,947	0.0
São Félix do Xingu	Município	Brazil	84,213	65,418	0.8
Bordj Omar Driss	Commune	Algeria	83,030	5,736	0.1
Chongqing	Province-level city	China	82,403	32,054,159	389
Abalessa	Commune	Algeria	80,381	9,163	0.1
Mackenzie County	Specialized municipality	Canada	79,629.26	12,840	0.2
Nyingchi	Prefecture-level City	China	77,680	238,936	3
Atalaia do Norte	Município	Brazil	76,508	15,314	0.2
Illizi	Commune	Algeria	76,023	17,252	0.2
Heihe	Prefecture-level City	China	74,415	1,286,401	17
Tindouf	Commune	Algeria	73,882	45,966	0.6
Almeirim	Município	Brazil	72,955	72,955	0.5
Charagua	Município	Bolivia	71,360	40,476	0.6
Turpan	Prefecture-level City	China	69,750	693,988	10
Hassi Messaoud	Commune	Algeria	69,582	45,147	0.6
Jutaí	Município	Brazil	69,457	69,457	0.4
Tesker	Commune	Niger	69,278	37,132	0.5
Lábrea	Município	Brazil	68,263	45,448	0.7
Cumaribo	Município	Colombia	65,597	79,122	1
Bayannur	Prefecture-level City	China	65,143	1,538,715	24
Foggaret Ezzaouia	Commune	Algeria	64,572	6,649	0.1
Corumbá	Município	Brazil	64,432	96,268	1.5
Santa Isabel do Rio Negro	Município	Brazil	62,800	14,164	0.2
Itaituba	Município	Brazil	62,042	123,314	2.0
Qeqertalik	Municipality	Greenland	62,400	6,082	0.1
In-Gall	Commune	Niger	61,171	51,903	0.8
Regional Municipality of Wood Buffalo	Specialized municipality	Canada	60,843.88	72,326	1.1
Tabelbala	Commune	Algeria	60,390	5,121	0.1
Tichit	Commune	Mauritania	59,575	3,331	0.06
Tongliao	Prefecture-level City	China	58,863	2,873,168	49
Idlès	Commune	Algeria	58,338	4,945	0.1
Coari	Município	Brazil	57,971	70,616	0.2
Djanet	Commune	Algeria	57,008	14,655	0.3
Japurá	Município	Brazil	55,827	8,858	0.2
Apuí	Município	Brazil	54,241	20,647	0.4
Jacareacanga	Município	Brazil	53,305	24,042	0.5
Harbin	Sub-provincial city	China	53,069	10,009,854	189
Aderbissinat	Commune	Niger	51,358	35,320	0.7
In Guezzam	Commune	Algeria	51,122	7,045	0.1
Kujalleq	Municipality	Greenland	51,000	6,205	0.1

== Urban areas ==
This table shows all cities or conurbations with a total urbanised area of at least 2,590 square kilometres (1,000 sq mi), according to Demographia's annual World Urban Areas publication, that uses a consistent methodology between countries to provide comparable population and area figures.

Rank	Urban area	Country	Built-up land area (km^{2})	Population	Urban population density (per km^{2})
1	New York	United States	11,344	20,892,000	1,842
2	Guangzhou–Shenzhen	China	10,635	69,562,000	6,541
3	Shanghai	China	9,731	45,115,000	4,636
4	Boston–Providence	United States	8,847	7,375,000	834
5	Tokyo–Yokohama	Japan	8,775	37,325,000	4,254
6	Atlanta	United States	7,151	5,495,000	768
7	Greater Los Angeles	United States	6,918	15,582,000	2,252
8	Moscow	Russia	6,643	18,509,000	2,786
9	Chicago	United States	6,532	8,790,000	1,346
10	Washington, D.C.–Baltimore	United States	5,600	7,636,000	1,364
11	Greater Houston	United States	5,390	6,804,000	1,262
12	Dallas–Fort Worth	United States	5,307	6,980,000	1,315
13	Philadelphia	United States	4,916	5,697,000	1,159
14	Beijing	China	4,284	22,363,000	5,220
15	Detroit	United States	4,082	4,143,000	1,015
16	Johannesburg–Pretoria	South Africa	4,040	15,026,000	3,719
17	Nagoya	Japan	3,704	9,617,000	2,597
18	São Paulo	Brazil	3,649	21,747,000	5,959
19	San Francisco Bay Area	United States	3,634	6,376,000	1,755
20	Charlotte	United States	3,631	2,214,000	610
21	Cleveland	United States	3,608	2,642,000	732
22	Jakarta	Indonesia	3,546	36,877,000	10,400
23	Buenos Aires	Argentina	3,437	15,933,000	4,636
24	Phoenix	United States	3,235	4,600,000	1,422
25	Miami	United States	3,222	6,129,000	1,902
26	Bangkok	Thailand	3,199	20,284,000	6,341
27	Orlando	United States	3,144	3,204,000	1,019
28	Seattle	United States	3,131	3,952,000	1,262
29	Osaka–Kobe–Kyoto	Japan	3,020	14,998,000	4,966
30	Tampa–St. Petersburg	United States	2,997	3,180,000	1,061
31	Melbourne	Australia	2,982	5,435,000	1,800
32	Paris	France	2,854	11,282,000	3,953
33	Tianjin	China	2,813	12,095,000	4,300
34	Seoul–Incheon	South Korea	2,769	23,825,000	8,605
35	Cairo	Egypt	2,696	22,684,000	8,413
36	Essen–Düsseldorf	Germany	2,683	6,874,000	2,562
37	Brisbane–Gold Coast	Australia	2,647	3,039,000	1,148
38	Minneapolis–Saint Paul	United States	2,629	2,904,000	1,105

== See also ==
- List of largest cities
- List of United States cities by area
