= Dar El Barka =

- Commune and town
- Location in Mauritania
- Country: Mauritania
- Region: Brakna
- Department: Bogué (department)

Government
  - Mayor: Ebeid El Id Mohamed El Abd (PUD)

Population (2023)
  - Total: 15,248
- Time zone: UTC+0 (GMT)

Dar El Barka is a town and commune in the Brakna Region of southern Mauritania.

In 2000, it had a population of 12,353. In 2023, it had population of 15,248.
