= Aleg =

Aleg ألاك
- Commune and town
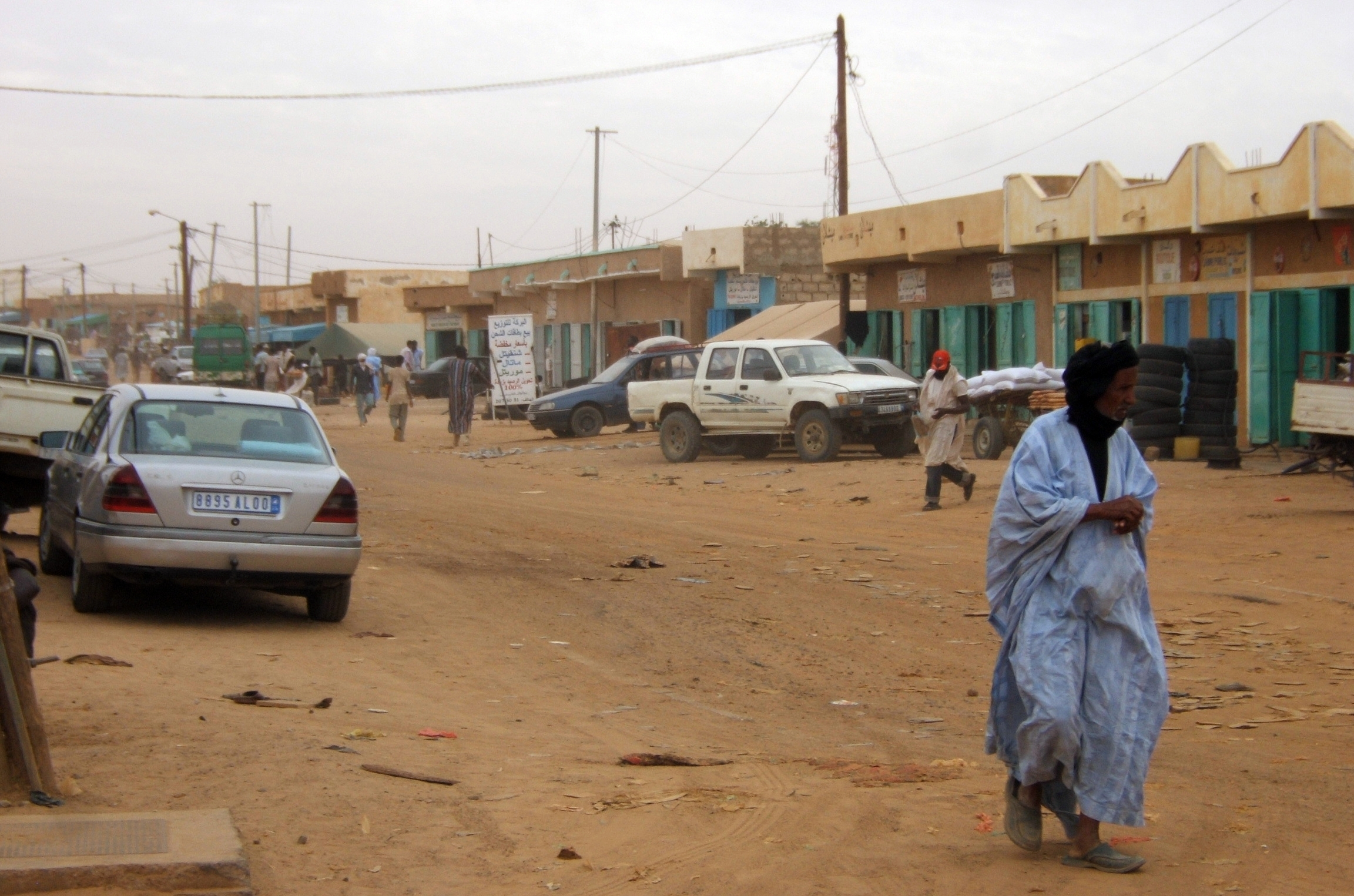

- Location in Mauritania
- Coordinates: 17°3′N 13°55′W
- Country: Mauritania
- Region: Brakna
- Department: Aleg (department)

Population (2023 census)
  - Total: 27,120

Aleg is the capital of the Brakna Region, in Mauritania. It is located at 17°3′0″N 13°55′0″W. The city name means “ascending path” in Zenaga. It lies on Lake Aleg.

== Background ==
The town includes the village of 'Elb Jmel, and the village of Lamden which is known as the birthplace of former President of Mauritania, Sidi Ould Cheikh Abdallahi.

== The Road of Hope ==
The Road of Hope – or "Transmauritanian" – is the most important road axis in Mauritania. Crossing the south of the country from west to east for approximately 1,100 km, this almost straight asphalt road connects the capital Nouakchott to Néma, at the gateway to Mali.

It serves the following localities (from west to east): Nouakchott, Boutilimit, Aleg, Kiffa, Ayoun el-Atrouss, Timbedra and Néma.
