= Fderîck (department) =

Coordinates: 22°40′41″N 12°42′46″W

- Department
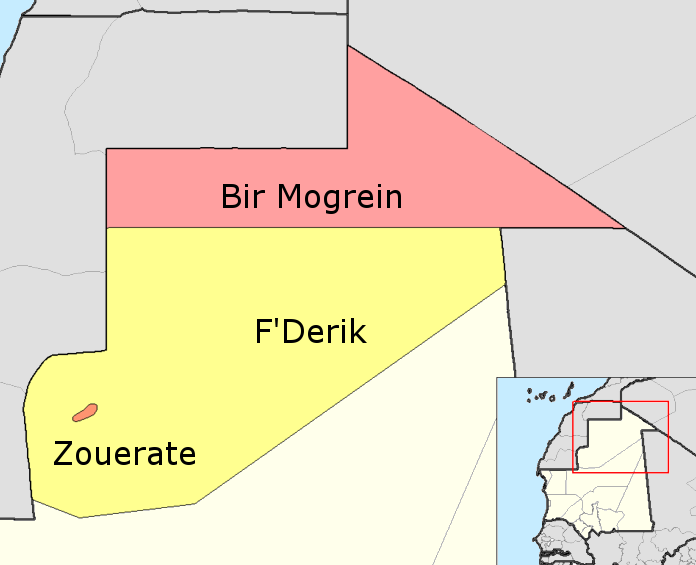

- Location within Mauritania
- Country: Mauritania

Area
  - Total: 171,267 km^{2} (66,127 sq mi)

Population (2013 census)
  - Total: 4,715
  - Density: 0.02753/km^{2} (0.07130/sq mi)

Fderîck is a department of Tiris Zemmour Region in Mauritania. It includes the town of Fderîck.
