= El Djouf =

Coordinates: 21°30′N 6°40′W

El Djouf الجوف
- Desert
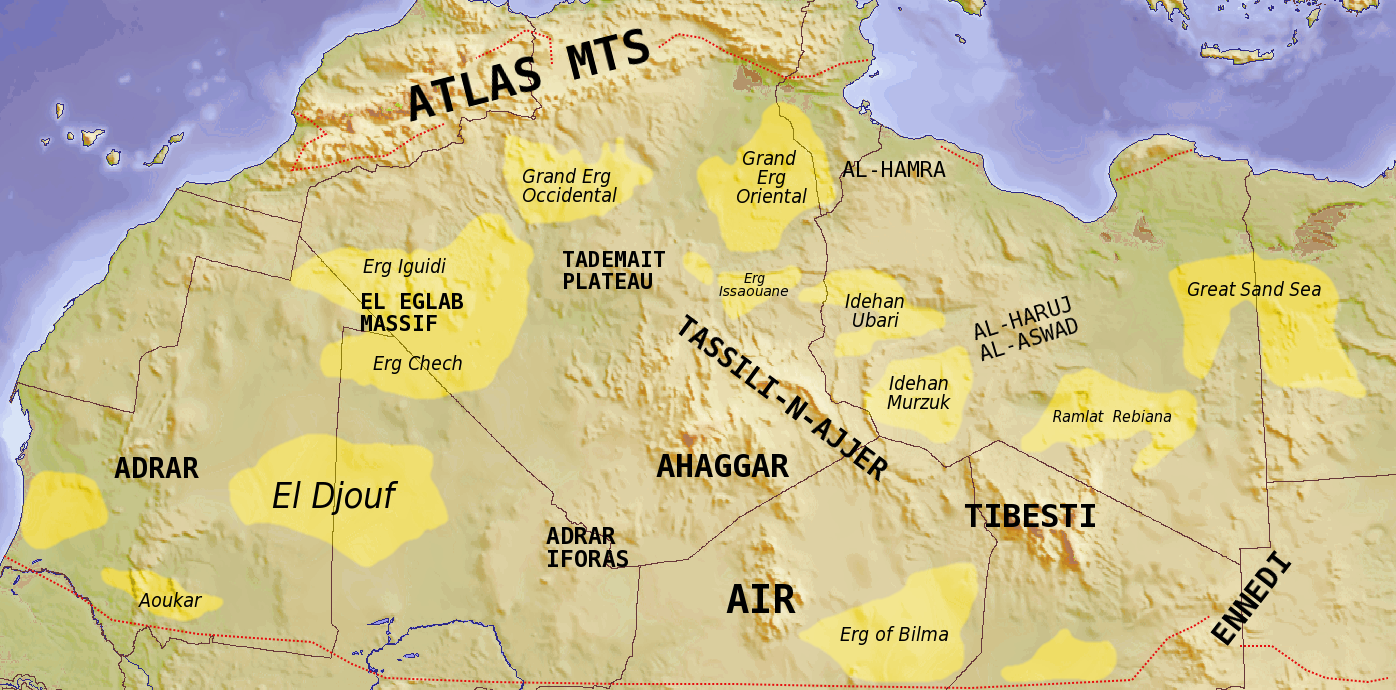
- Map of the topographic features of the Sahara
- Country: Mauritania and Mali
- Elevation: 320 m (1,050 ft)

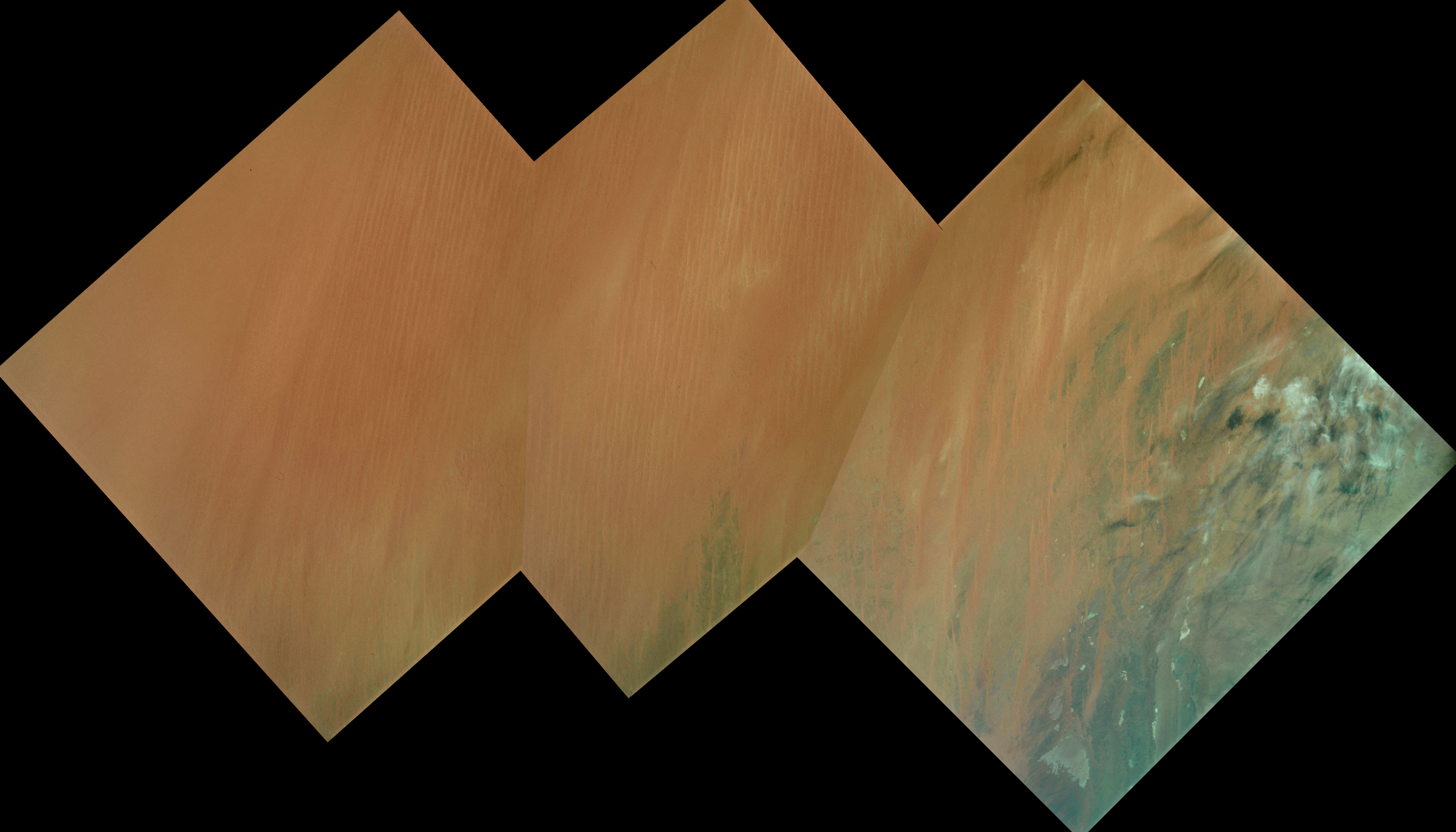
A part of El Djouf region viewed from space during the Apollo 9 mission. To the right are rock outcrops in western Mali, and to the left are dunes in eastern Mauritania.

El Djouf (Arabic: الجوف) is a desert, an arid natural region of sand dunes and rock salt which covers northeastern Mauritania and part of northwestern Mali. El Djouf is a part of the Sahara Desert in the north. El Djouf is 320 meters (1,050 feet) above sea level.

A meteorite of a rare type of carbonaceous chondrite was found in El Djouf in October 1989.

== Geographic features ==
The El Djouf consists in a typical African type of broad shallow sedimentary basin, separated by divides formed by fault blocks, plateaus and mountain ranges, where rock waste eroded from higher surfaces has been deposited at the base.

Other significant basins of this type are those of Lake Chad and the Victoria - Kyoga lake basin, as well as the Congo and Zambezi rivers.

== See also ==
- Geography of Mauritania
- Sahara Desert
