= Bogué (department) =

Bogué بوكي
- Department
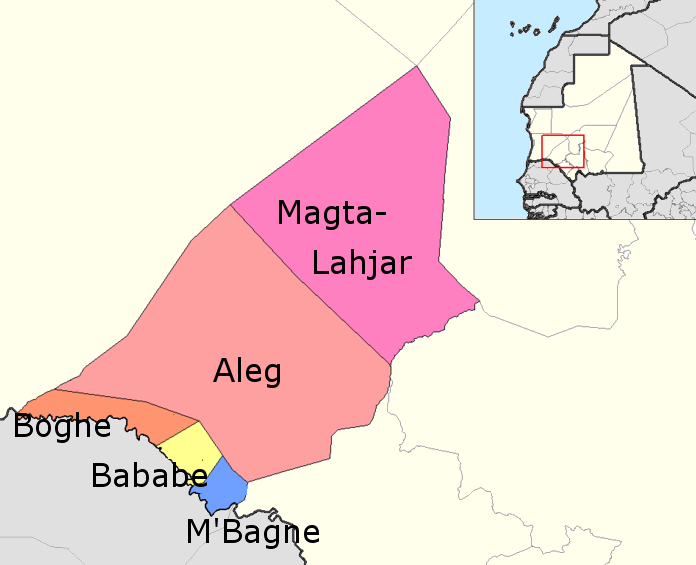

- Location within Mauritania
- Country: Mauritania

Area
  - Total: 1,703 km^{2} (658 sq mi)

Population (2013 census)
  - Total: 72,242
  - Density: 42.42/km^{2} (109.9/sq mi)

Bogué is a department of Brakna Region in Mauritania.

== List of municipalities in the department ==
The Bogué department is made up of following communes:

- Boghé
- Dar El Aviya
- Dar El Barka
- Ould Biram.

In 2013, the entire population of the Bogué Department had a total of 72,242 inhabitants (35,011 men and 37,231 women).
