= Tichit (department) =

- Department
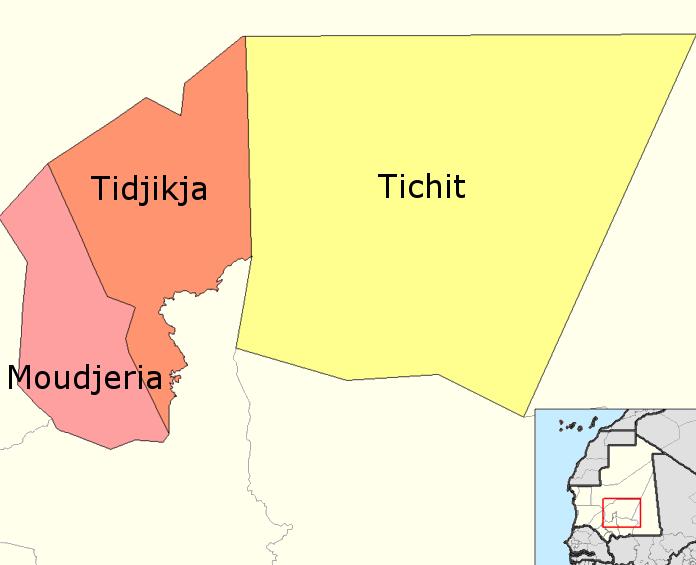

- Location within Mauritania
- Country: Mauritania

Tichit is a department of Tagant Region in Mauritania.
