= Moudjeria (department) =

Coordinates: 17°52′50″N 12°19′57″W

- Department
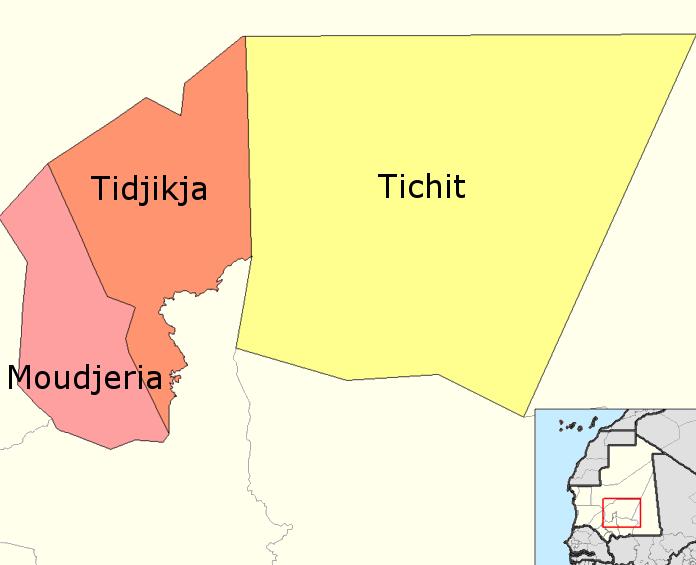

- Location within Mauritania
- Country: Mauritania

Moudjeria is a department of Tagant Region in Mauritania.
