= Kediet ej Jill =

Mountain in Mauritania

Kediet ej Jill كدية الجل
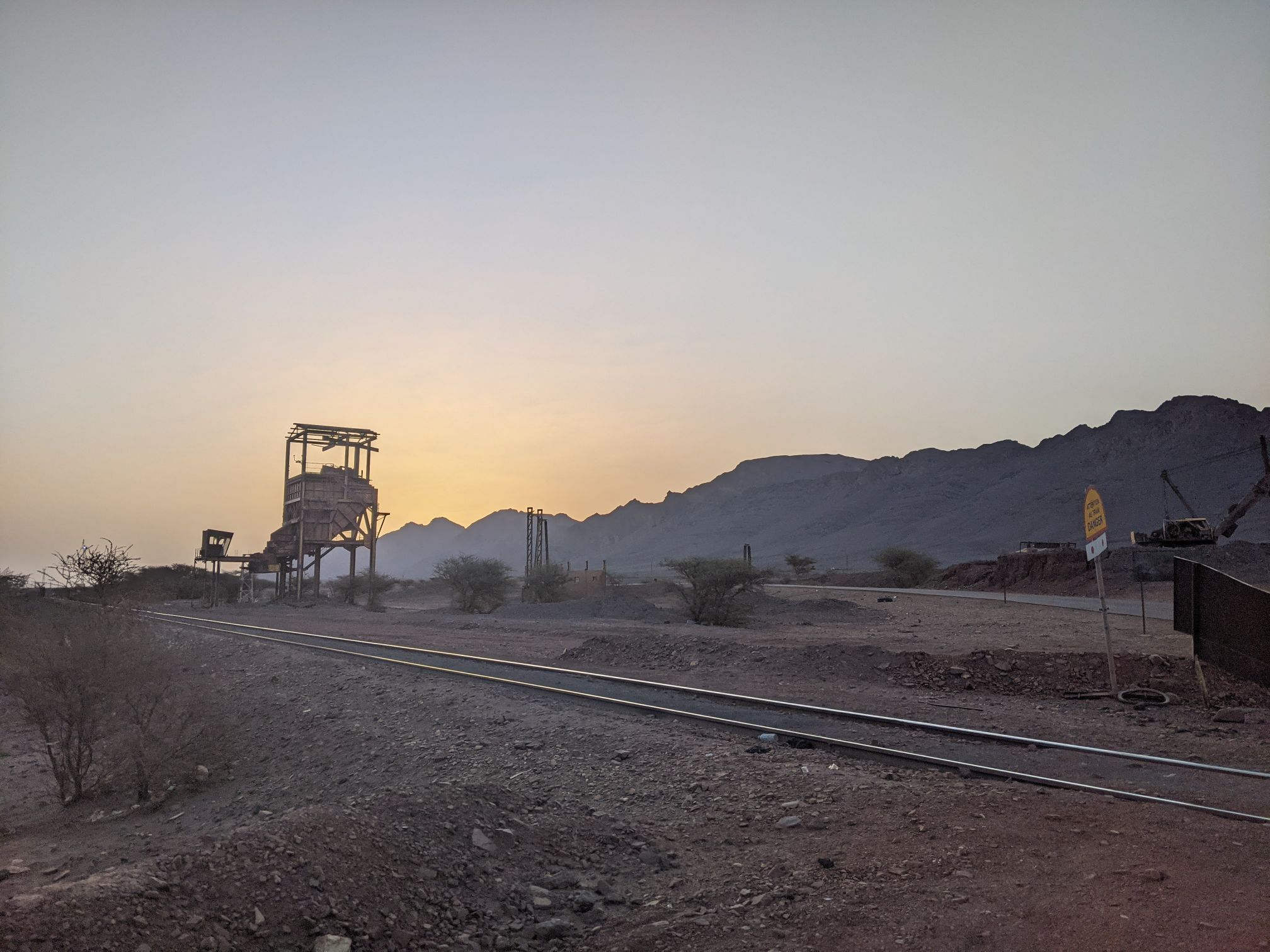
- Kediet ej Jill in 2022

Highest point
- Elevation: 915 m (3,002 ft)
- Prominence: 596 m (1,955 ft)
- Listing: Country high point
- Coordinates: 22°39′04″N 12°34′27″W

Geography
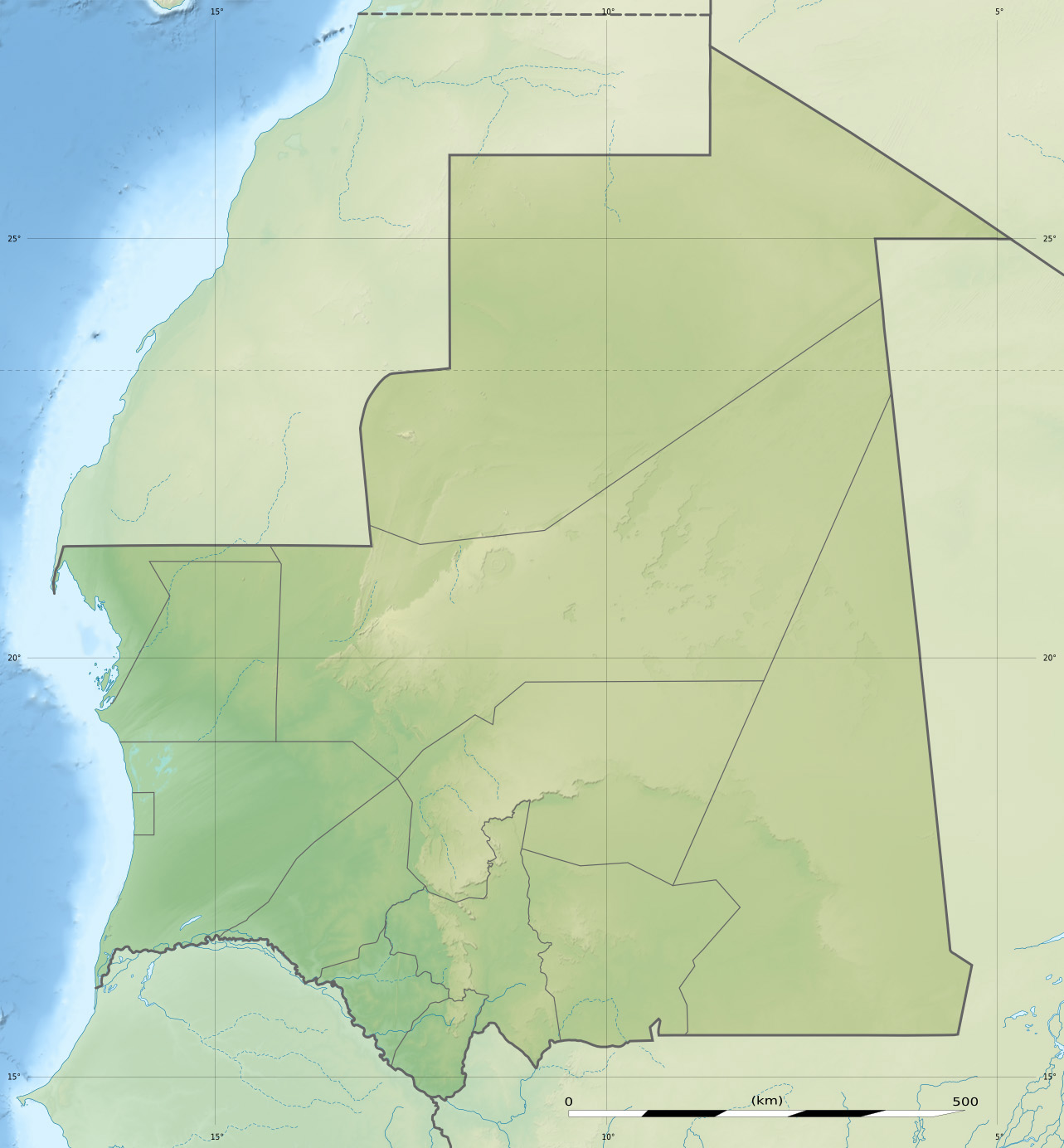
- Location within Mauritania
- Location: Mauritania

Kediet ej Jill (Arabic: كدية الجل) is a mountain in Tiris Zemmour, Mauritania, with the city of Zouérat on its east and Fderick at west.

== Geography ==
At 915 m (3,002 ft) tall, Kediet ej Jill includes the highest peak in Mauritania. The mountain and its surrounding area are rich in iron deposits, thought to have been mined here since the 11th century and commercially exploited since 1952. The mines are connected to Nouadhibou on the Atlantic coast by a 700 km railway.

=== Geology ===
The mountain appears bluish because of the high concentration of magnetite, an iron ore and naturally magnetic. Owing to its inherent magnetic properties, the mountain disrupts navigational compasses. Similar magnetic fields allowed the discovery of other deposits in the region (magnetite guelbs) in the 1960s.

=== Environment ===
Ephemeral watercourses drain from the mountain escarpment into the surrounding desert. The vegetation includes Phoenix dactylifera, Adiantum capillus-veneris, Hyoscyamus muticus, Tamarix sp., Vachellia tortilis, Rhus tripartitus, Capparis decidua, Leptadenia pyrotechnica, Maerua crassifolia, Salvadora persica, Balanites aegyptiaca and Panicum turgidum.

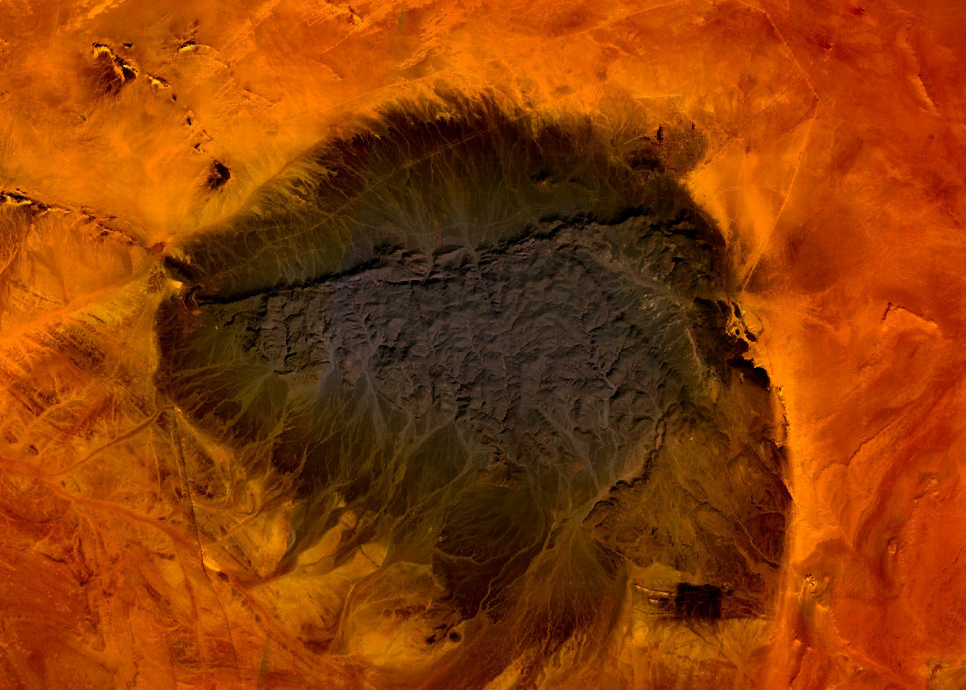
Kediet ej Jill seen from space

The site has been designated an Important Bird Area (IBA) by BirdLife International because it supports significant populations of crowned sandgrouse, Nubian bustards, pharaoh eagle-owls, greater hoopoe-larks, bar-tailed larks, desert larks, pale rock martins, streaked scrub-warblers, fulvous babblers, white-crowned and mourning wheatears, desert sparrows and trumpeter finches.
