= M'Bagne (department) =

M'Bagne امباني
- Department
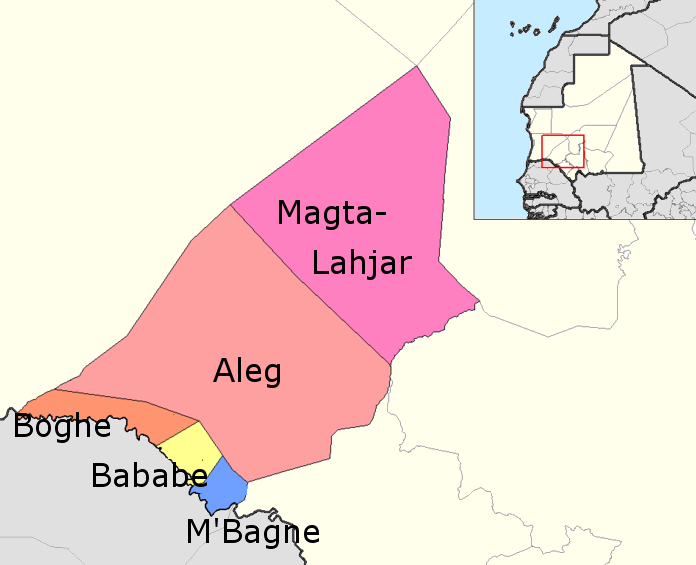

- Location within Mauritania
- Country: Mauritania

Area
  - Total: 686.0 km^{2} (264.9 sq mi)

Population (2013 census)
  - Total: 43,600
  - Density: 63.6/km^{2} (165/sq mi)

M'Bagne is a department of Brakna Region in Mauritania. It includes the cities of M'Bagne, Niabina, Bagodine and Edbaye El Hijaj.

== List of municipalities in the department ==
The M'Bagne department is made up of following communes:

- Bagodine
- Edbaye El Hejaj
- Mbagne
- Niabina
