= Sebkha de Ndrhamcha =

Salt pan in Mauritania

Coordinates: 18.45°N 15.48°W

The Sebkha de Ndrhamcha (Arabic: سبخة ندرهامشا) or Sebkhet Te-n-Dghamcha is a large salt pan in Mauritania that is about 40 kilometres (25 mi) in diameter. The Atlantic Ocean borders it to the west, and the Sahara Desert lies directly to its east. At 5 meters below sea level, it is the lowest point in Mauritania.
