= Tiris Zemmour region =

Region of Mauritania

Tiris Zemmour ولاية تيرس زمور
- Region of Mauritania
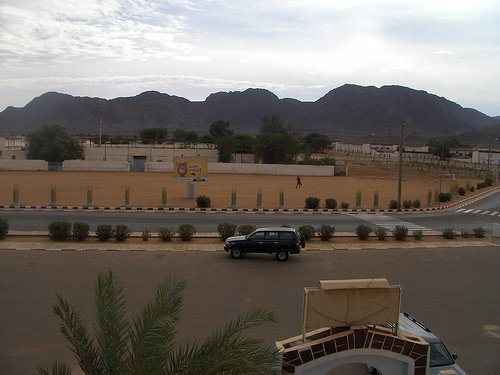
- A street in the regional capital of Zouérat

- Coordinates: 24°00′N 9°00′W
- Country: Mauritania
- Departments: 3: Bir Moghrein; Fderîck; Zouérat
- Capital: Zouérat

Area
  - Total: 252,900 km^{2} (97,600 sq mi)

Population (2023 census)
  - Total: 79,129
  - Density: 0.3129/km^{2} (0.8104/sq mi)
- Time zone: UTC+0
  - Summer (DST): not observed
- HDI (2017): 0.593

Tiris Zemmour (Arabic: ولاية تيرس زمور, romanized: Wilāyat Tiris Zemmour) is the northernmost region of Mauritania. Its capital is Zouérat. Other major cities/towns include F'dérik and Bir Moghrein. The region borders Algeria to the north-east, Mali to east, the Mauritanian region of Adrar to the south and Western Sahara to west and north-west.

As of 2013, the population of the region was 53,261, compared to 49,842 in 2011. As of 2008, the activity rate was 50.80 and economic dependency ratio was 0.71. As of 2008, the literacy rate for people aged 15 years and over was 81.00.

== Demographics ==
Historical population
| Year | Pop. | ±% p.a. |
|---|---|---|
| 1977 | 22,554 | — |
| 1988 | 33,147 | +3.56% |
| 2000 | 41,121 | +1.81% |
| 2013 | 53,261 | +2.01% |
| 2023 | 79,129 | +4.04% |

As of 2013, the population of the region was 53,261, compared to 49,842 in 2011. 55.61% of the population were females and 44.39% were males.

As of 2008, the percentage of households confirming the existence of public telephone in their neighbourhood or village was 96.75%, the percentage of households benefiting from electricity in their neighbourhood was 4.06%, the percentage of households benefiting from health center or health post in their neighbourhood was 1.72%, and the percentage of households benefiting from sanitary services was 0.51%.

== Economy ==
As of 2008, the activity rate was 50.80 and economic dependency ratio was 0.71. The fraction of people working in government was 23.10%, individual / household private was 5.80%, other was 33.60%, para-public was 20.20%, and private enterprise was 17.30%. The Grand Total as of 2008 was 943.01. As of 2013, the coverage rate of DPT3 Children From 0 to 11 Months in the region was 74.80%, BGC vaccination was 78.20% and polio vaccination coverage was 74.50%. As of 2007, the number of tourist establishments in the region was 4. As of 2008, the literacy rate for people aged 15 years and over was 81.00%. The net enrollment ratio of girls for secondary level was 36.90%, net enrollment ratio of boys for secondary level was 23.30%, and total net enrolment ratio at secondary level was 30.20%.

== Geography ==
Mauritania is mostly covered with desert, with only its western regions around the coast of Atlantic Ocean having some vegetation. There are some oasis in the desert regions. Since it is a desert, there are large shifting dunes forming temporary ranges. The average elevation is around 460 m (1,510 ft) above the mean sea level. The rainfall in the northern regions closer to the Tropic of Cancer is around 100 mm (3.9 in) annually, compared to the southern portions that receives around 660 mm (26 in). The average temperature is 37.8 °C (100.0 °F), while during the night it reaches 0 °C (32 °F).

Due to the geography, the inhabitants historically, have been nomadic. In modern times, people have migrated to urban centres during the drought in the 1970s and the early 1980s. There are a few sedentary cultivators, who are located only in the southern regions of the country. Research has indicated that the Saharan movement has resulted in reduction of rains in the region from the 1960s, when it received close to 250 mm (9.8 in) of rainfall.

== Administration ==
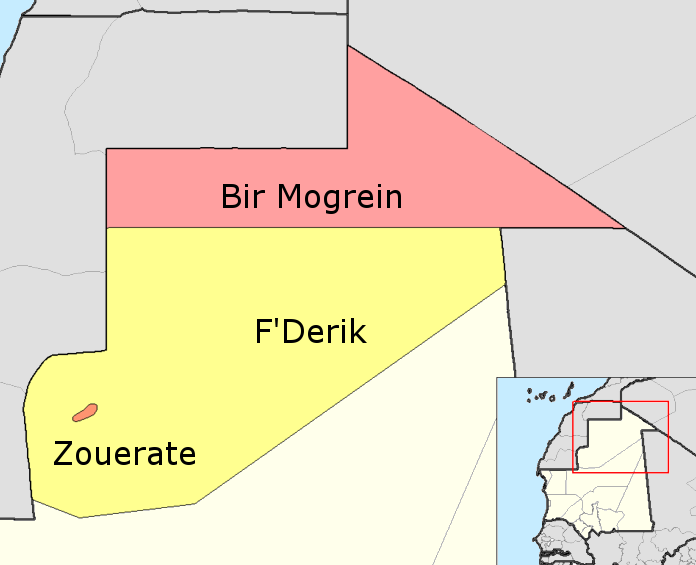
Departments of Tiris Zemmour.

Tiris Zemmour is divided into three departments, namely, Bir Moghrein, F'derik and Zouérat. The local administration is adopted from French local administration framework with a Ministry of Internal Control governing the local bodies. The original administration was held by Governors of each district, but after the municipal elections in 1994, the powers has been decentralized from the district bodies. Mauritania has been divided into 13 wilayas (regions), including the Nouakchott Capital District. The smallest administrative division in the country is the commune and the country has 216 of them. A group of communes form a moughataa (department) and the group of moughataa form a district. There are total of 53 moughataa for the 13 districts in the country. The executive power of the district is vested on a district chief, while it is on hakem for moughataa. Out of the 216 communes, 53 classified as urban and rest 163 are rural.

The communes are responsible for overseeing and coordinating development activities and are financed by the state. The local governments have their own legal jurisdiction, financial autonomy, an annual budget, staff, and an office. The elections for the local government are conducted every five years along with Regional and Parliamentary elections. On account of the political instability, the last elections were held in 2023.

== See also ==
- Departments of Mauritania
- Geography of Mauritania
- Regions of Mauritania
- Tiris al-Gharbiyya
