= Fderîck =

Fderîck افديرك
- Location in Mauritania
- Coordinates: 22°40′42″N 12°42′41″W
- Country: Mauritania
- Region: Tiris Zemmour Region

Area
  - Total: 169,684 km^{2} (65,515 sq mi)
- Elevation: 455 m (1,493 ft)

Population (2023)
  - Total: 11,623

Fderîck or F'dérick (Arabic: افديرك) is a commune and town in the Tiris Zemmour Region of northern Mauritania. It is located near the border with Western Sahara, in a remote area of the Sahara desert, on the west side of the Kediet Ijill. Fderîck was constructed in the late 1950s around the former French Fort Gouraud to exploit the area's iron deposits. The iron is transported by the Mauritania Railway to the port at Nouadhibou. The city of Atar provides access to the capital, Nouakchott.

The entire commune covers an area of 169,684 km², making it one of the largest municipalities in the world. The primary town is located in the west of the commune.

Zouérat lies 30 km east of Fderîck.

== See also ==
- Railway stations in Mauritania
