= Bir Moghrein =

Bir Moghrein بئر مغرين
- Commune
- Location in Mauritania
- Coordinates: 25°13′N 11°37′W
- Country: Mauritania
- Region: Tiris Zemmour

Area
  - Commune: 87,401 km^{2} (33,746 sq mi)

Population (Census 2013)
  - Commune: 3,897
  - Density: 0.04459/km^{2} (0.1155/sq mi)
  - Urban: 1,613

Bir Moghrein, meaning Well of Moghrein (Arabic: بئر مغرين) is a commune and town with 3,897 residents (Census 2013) in the Tiris Zemmour region of northern Mauritania, close to the border with Western Sahara.

== Climate ==
Climate data for Bir Moghrein
Month	Jan	Feb	Mar	Apr	May	Jun	Jul	Aug	Sep	Oct	Nov	Dec	Year
Mean daily maximum °C (°F)	21 (70)	24 (75)	27 (80)	28 (82)	30 (86)	34 (93)	39 (102)	39 (103)	36 (96)	31 (87)	26 (79)	22 (72)	30 (86)
Mean daily minimum °C (°F)	12 (54)	14 (57)	16 (61)	17 (63)	18 (65)	21 (69)	25 (77)	26 (78)	24 (76)	21 (69)	17 (63)	13 (56)	19 (66)
Average precipitation mm (inches)	2.5 (0.1)	2.5 (0.1)	0 (0)	2.5 (0.1)	0 (0)	0 (0)	0 (0)	2.5 (0.1)	13 (0.5)	7.6 (0.3)	5.1 (0.2)	5.1 (0.2)	38 (1.5)
Source: Weatherbase
