= Zouérat =

Zouérat الزويرات
- Commune and town
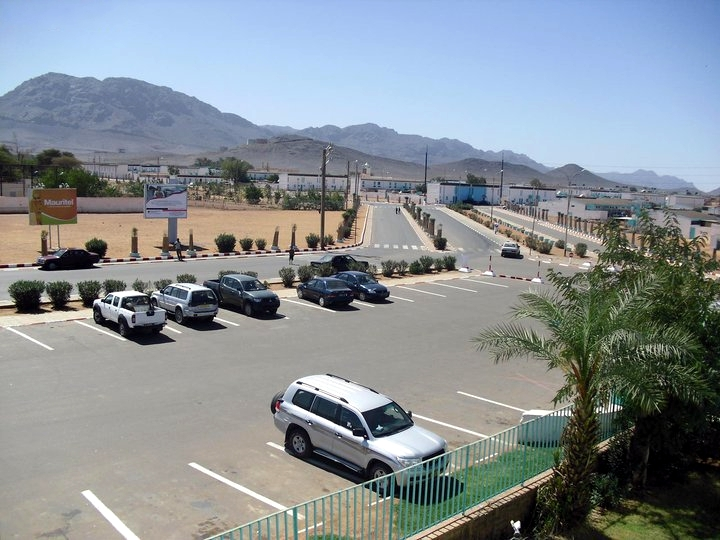
- Zouérat city center

- Location in Mauritania
- Coordinates: 22°44′12″N 12°28′00″W
- Country: Mauritania
- Region: Tiris Zemmour

Area
  - Total: 804.3 km^{2} (310.5 sq mi)
- Elevation: 380 m (1,250 ft)

Population (2023 census)
  - Total: 62,380
  - Density: 77.56/km^{2} (200.9/sq mi)

Zouérat (Arabic: الزويرات) is the largest town in northern Mauritania and the capital of the Tiris Zemmour region, with an approximate population of 62,380 (2023). It lies at the eastern end of the Mauritania Railway to Nouadhibou.

== History ==
The town developed from its importance to iron ore mining. It is surrounded by the hematite mines of Fderîck, Tazadit and Rouessa. The town is the location of the regional administration and military for Tiris Zemmour. Most of the town's population are employed directly and indirectly in the mining industry. A sizeable number of foreign workers from other African countries live in the town. Amenities include a medical clinic, social club, pool, school and shop.

Since 2006, a shanty town has grown around the town. In response authorities have begun construction of a wall, nicknamed locally as the "mur de la honte" (wall of shame), to separate the two areas.

=== Mining ===
Mining at the mountain was first recorded from the Kediet ej Jill in the 11th century, but it was not until 1952 that iron ore deposits were first commercially extracted on an industrial scale. Beginning in 1958, the first concessions on iron ore extraction were given to Miferma, Société des mines de fer de Mauritanie. At the time it was majority-controlled by European-based mining interests. However, in 1974 Miferma was nationalized by the Mauritanian government.

In 1981 a new iron ore deposit was discovered at Guelb el Rhein, 35 km (22 mi) north of Zouérat. Almost a decade later, another was found in 1990 at Guelb Mhadaouat about 65 km (40 mi) from Zouérat. Other companies exploring for iron ore in the region include Xstrata and Arcelor Mittal. The reserves at the SNIM's Tazadit mine are estimated to be 200 million tonnes of hematite.

== Transport ==
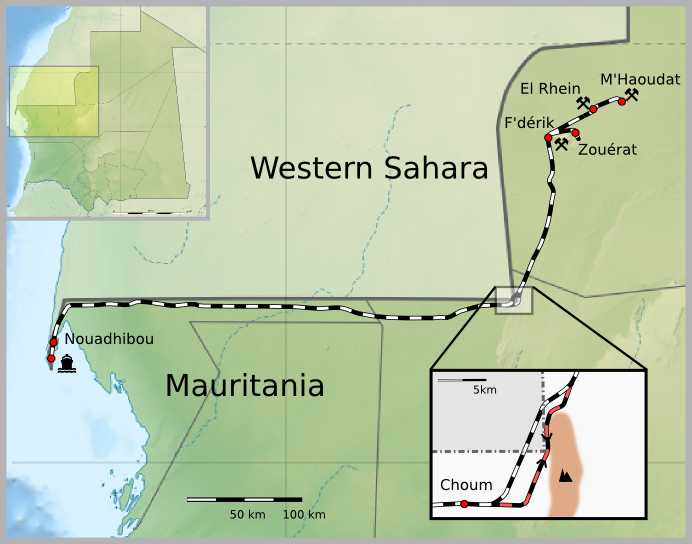
Map showing the location of Zouérat on the Mauritania Railway

Zouérat is connected to the port of Nouadhibou by the Mauritania Railway. Freight trains that transport the iron ore to the coast can be as long as 2.5 km (1.6 mi) in length. The line is also used to bring in all the town's drinking water from Boulenoir.

Tazadit Airport is served by regular flights from/to Nouadhibou and seasonally from/to Casablanca using Mauritania Airlines International Boeing 737-500 and Boeing 737-700 planes.

Outside the mines, traffic drives on the right side of the road like the rest of Mauritania. However, all vehicles within the mining areas drive on the left. Traffic switches sides at the mine entrances.

== Climate ==
Zouérat has a hot desert climate (Köppen climate classification BWh). The climate is hot and dry throughout the year due to the town's location within the extremes of the Sahara.

Climate data for Zouerat
Month	Jan	Feb	Mar	Apr	May	Jun	Jul	Aug	Sep	Oct	Nov	Dec	Year
Record high °C (°F)	34 (93)	34 (93)	37 (99)	40 (104)	43 (109)	46 (115)	47 (117)	46 (115)	44 (111)	41 (106)	38 (100)	36 (97)	47 (117)
Mean daily maximum °C (°F)	22 (72)	25 (77)	26 (79)	31 (88)	33 (91)	36 (97)	40 (104)	40 (104)	37 (99)	32 (90)	27 (81)	23 (73)	31 (88)
Mean daily minimum °C (°F)	12 (54)	15 (59)	16 (61)	18 (64)	20 (68)	23 (73)	26 (79)	27 (81)	26 (79)	22 (72)	18 (64)	14 (57)	20 (68)
Record low °C (°F)	6 (43)	8 (46)	10 (50)	10 (50)	12 (54)	15 (59)	16 (61)	18 (64)	17 (63)	12 (54)	10 (50)	6 (43)	6 (43)
Average precipitation mm (inches)	4 (0.2)	2 (0.1)	2 (0.1)	1 (0.0)	1 (0.0)	2 (0.1)	3 (0.1)	8 (0.3)	21 (0.8)	5 (0.2)	4 (0.2)	3 (0.1)	56 (2.2)
Source: Weatherbase

== See also ==
- Railway stations in Mauritania
- Tiris Zemmour
