= Brakna region =

Region of Mauritania

Brakna ولاية البراكنة
- Region of Mauritania
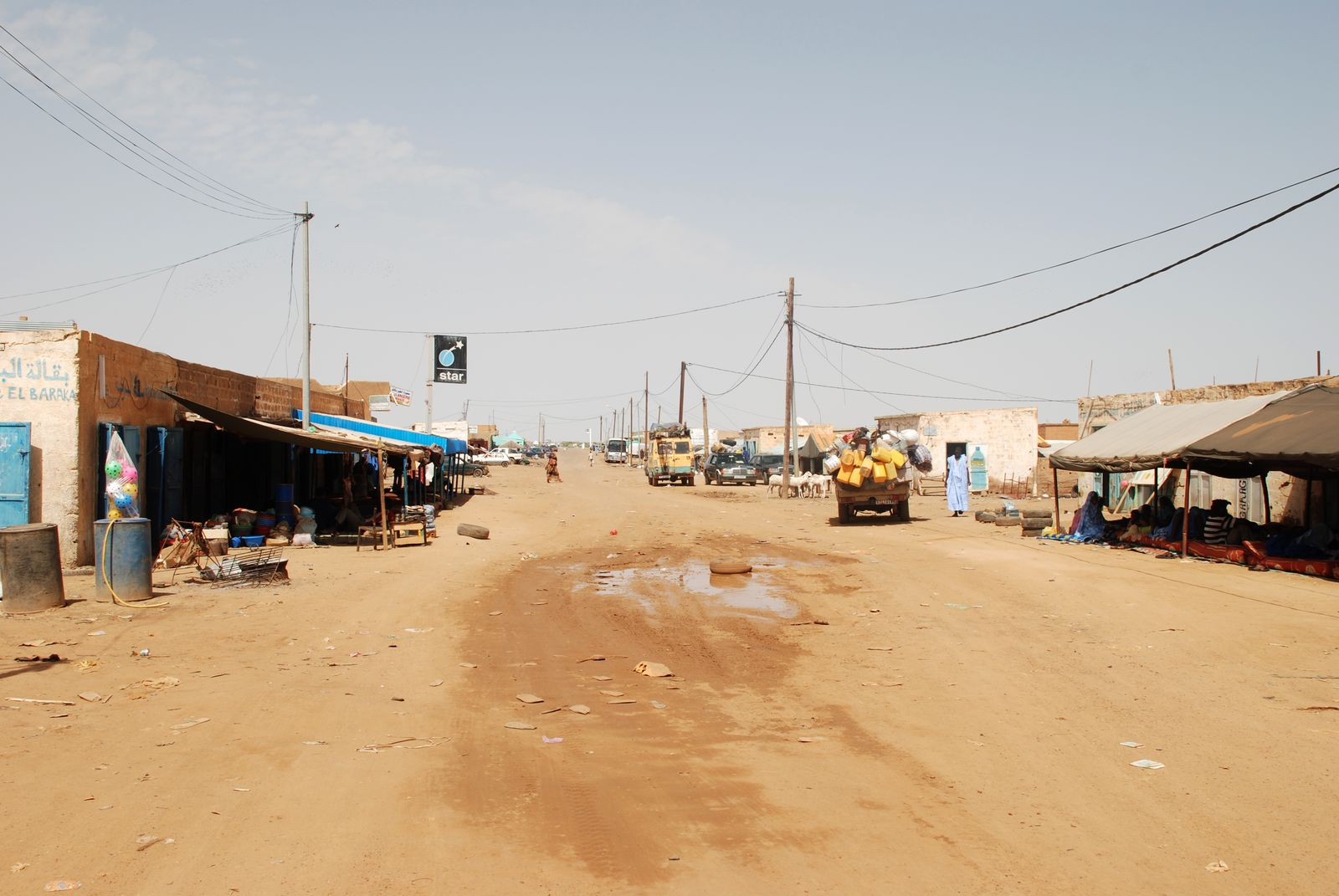

- Coordinates: 17°38′N 13°25′W
- Country: Mauritania
- Departments: 5: Aleg; Bababe; Bogué; M'Bagne; Magtar Lahjar
- Capital: Aleg

Area
  - Total: 33,800 km^{2} (13,100 sq mi)

Population (2023 census)
  - Total: 391,310
  - Density: 11.6/km^{2} (30.0/sq mi)
- Time zone: UTC+0
  - Summer (DST): not observed
- HDI (2017): 0.498 low

Brakna (Arabic: ولاية البراكنة, romanized: Wilāyat al-Brāknah) is a region in south-west Mauritania. Its capital is Aleg and its other major cities/towns include Boghé. The region borders the Mauritanian regions of Tagant to the north-east, Assaba and Gorgol to the south-east, and Trarza to the north-west. The Sénégal River in the south-west runs along the region's border with Senegal.

The region is named after the Emirate of Brakna.

As of 2013, the population of the region was 312,277, compared to 309,307 in 2011. There were 46.96 per cent females and 53.04 per cent males. As of 2008, the activity rate was 40.30 and economic dependency ratio was 1.01. As of 2008, the literacy rate for people aged 15 years and over was 50.30. The net enrollment ratio of children for secondary level was 7.10 per cent.

== Geography ==
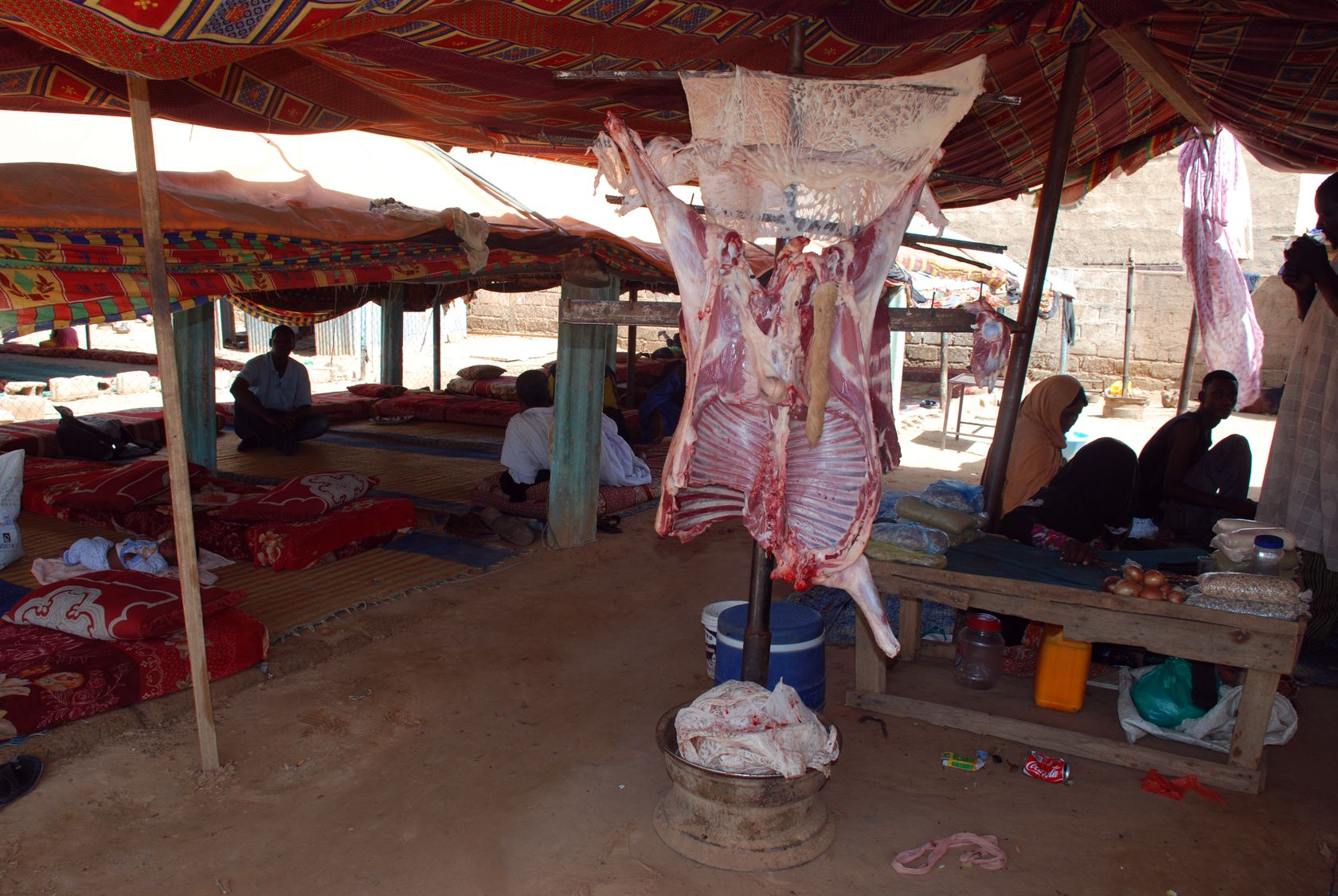
A traditional restaurant in the region

Mauritania is mostly covered with desert, with only its western regions around the coast of Atlantic Ocean having some vegetation. There are some oasis in the desert regions. Since it is a desert, there are large shifting dunes forming temporary ranges. The average elevation is around 460 m (1,510 ft) above the mean sea level. The rainfall in the northern regions closer to the Tropic of Cancer receives around 100 mm (3.9 in) of annual rainfall compared to the southern portions that receives around 660 mm (26 in). The average temperature is 37.8 °C (100.0 °F), while during the night it reaches 0 °C (32 °F).

Due to the geography, the inhabitants historically, have been nomadic. In modern times, people have migrated to urban centres during the drought in the 1970s and the early 1980s. There are a few sedentary cultivators, who are located only in the Southern regions of the country. Research has indicated that the Saharan movement has resulted in reduction of rains in the region from the 1960s, when it received close to 250 mm (9.8 in) of rainfall.

== Demographics ==
Historical population
Year	Pop.	±% p.a.
1977	151,353	—
1988	192,157	+2.19%
2000	247,006	+2.11%
2013	312,277	+1.82%
2023	391,310	+2.28%

As of 2013, the population of the region was 312,277, compared to 309,307 in 2011. There were 46.96 per cent females and 53.04 per cent males. As of 2008, the Couples with children was 41.40 and Couples without children was 4.30. The proportion with extended family was 18.30 per cent and extended single-parent was 9.90 per cent, one-person was 2.90 per cent, and single-parent nuclear was 23.30 per cent. As of 2008, the rate of household confirming the existence of public telephone in their neighbourhood or village was 72.18, rate of households benefiting from electricity post in their neighbourhood was 3.37 per cent, rate of households benefiting from health center or health post in their neighbourhood was 16.04 per cent, and rate of households benefiting from sanitary services was 0.15 per cent.

== Economy and health ==
As of 2013, the coverage rate of DPT3 Children From 0 to 11 Months in the region was 89.30 per cent, BGC vaccination was 95.70 and polio vaccination coverage was 86.00. As of 2008, the activity rate was 40.30 and economic dependency ratio was 1.01. The fraction of people working in government was 10.10 per cent, individual / household private was 17.70 per cent, other was 55.20 per cent, para public was 0.70 per cent, and private enterprise was 16.30 per cent. The Grand Total as of 2008 was 531.61. As of 2007, the number of tourist establishments in the region was 3. As of 2008, the literacy rate for people aged 15 years and over was 50.30. The net enrolment ratio of girls for secondary level was 7.00 per cent, net enrolment ratio of boys for secondary level was 7.20 per cent, and total net enrollment ratio at secondary level was 7.10 per cent.

== Local administration ==
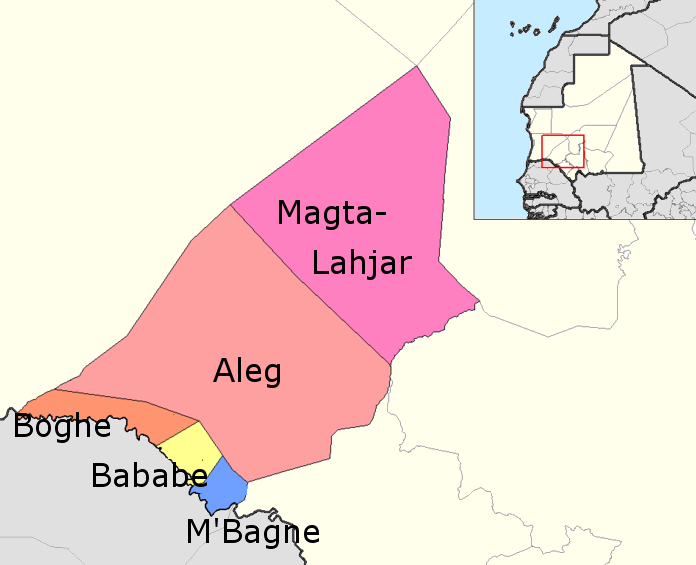
Departments of Brakna.

The local administration is adopted from French local administration framework with a Ministry of Internal Control governing the local bodies. The original administration was held by Governors of each district, but after the municipal elections in 1994, the powers has been decentralized from the district bodies. Mauritania has been divided into 13 wilayas (regions), including the Nouakchott Capital District. The smallest administrative division in the country is the commune and the country has 216 of them. A group of communes form a moughataa (department) and the group of moughataa form a district. There are total of 53 moughataa for the 13 districts in the country. The executive power of the district is vested on a district chief, while it is on hakem for moughataa. Out of the 216 communes, 53 classified as urban and rest 163 are rural.

The communes are responsible for overseeing and coordinating development activities and are financed by the state. The Local Governments have their own legal jurisdiction, financial autonomy, an annual budget, staff, and an office. The elections for the local government are conducted every five years along with Regional and Parliamentary elections. On account of the political instability, the last elections were held in 2023.

Brakna is divided into 5 departments, namely, Aleg, Bababe, Boghé, Mbagne and Magta-Lahjar.

== See also ==
- Regions of Mauritania
- Departments of Mauritania
