= Departments of Mauritania =

Departments of Mauritania مقاطعات موريتانيا (Arabic) Départements de Mauritanie (French)
- Category: Moughataa or department
- Location: Mauritania
- Found in: Wilayas
- Number: 63 (as of 2023)

Moughataas (Arabic: مقاطعات, romanized: muqāṭaʿāt) or departments (French: départements) are the second-level administrative subdivision of the Islamic Republic of Mauritania.

There are 63 departments in Mauritania as of 2023.

== List ==
Name		Wilaya	Population (2024)
French	Arabic	Wilaya	Population (2024)
Adel Bagrou	عدل بگرو	Hodh Ech Chargui	72,855
Aïoun	العيون	Hodh El Gharbi	78,229
Akjoujt	أكجوجت	Inchiri	18,138
Aleg	ألاگ	Brakna	75,856
Amourj	آمرج	Hodh Ech Chargui	78,148
Aoujeft	أوجفت	Adrar	13,877
Arafat	عرفات	Nouakchott-Sud	216,919
Atar	أطار	Adrar	47,346
Bababé	بابابي	Brakna	43,410
Barkéol	باركيول	Assaba	109,237
Bassiknou	باسكنو	Hodh Ech Chargui	123,337
Bénichab	بنشاب	Inchiri	11,346
Bir Moghrein	بير أم اگرين	Tiris Zemmour	5,126
Bogué	بوگي	Brakna	85,333
Boumdeid	بومديد	Assaba	10,747
Boutilimit	بوتليميت	Trarza	66,999
Chami	الشامي	Dakhlet Nouadhibou	7,382
Chinguetti	شنقيط	Adrar	6,549
Dar Naïm	دار النعيم	Nouakchott-Nord	186,925
Djigueni	جگني	Hodh Ech Chargui	91,605
El Mina	الميناء	Nouakchott-Sud	181,640
F'Déirick	افديرك	Tiris Zemmour	11,623
Ghabou	غابو	Guidimakha	113,669
Guerou	گرو	Assaba	67,964
Kaédi	كيهيدي	Gorgol	120,660
Kankossa	كنكوصة	Assaba	117,392
Keur Macène	كرمسين	Trarza	33,488
Kiffa	كيفة	Assaba	146,464
Koubenni	كوبني	Hodh El Gharbi	135,158
Ksar	لكصر	Nouakchott-Ouest	57,758
Lexeiba	لكصيبة	Gorgol	41,267
M'Bagne	امباني	Brakna	52,865
M'Bout	امبود	Gorgol	132,464
Maghama	مقامة	Gorgol	90,891
Magta Lahjar	مگطع لحجار	Brakna	79,046
Male	مال	Brakna	54,800
Méderdra	المذرذرة	Trarza	35,108
Monguel	مونگل	Gorgol	57,208
Moudjéria	المجرية	Tagant	57,936
N'Beiket Lehwach	انبيكت لحواش	Hodh Ech Chargui	12,652
Néma	النعمة	Hodh Ech Chargui	121,409
Nouadhibou	انواذيبو	Dakhlet Nouadhibou	177,077
Ouad Naga	واد الناقة	Trarza	24,605
Ouadane	وادان	Adrar	3,833
Oualata	ولاتة	Hodh Ech Chargui	12,842
Ould Yengé	ولد ينج	Guidimakha	92,582
R'Kiz	اركيز	Trarza	49,564
Riyad	الرياض	Nouakchott-Sud	228,856
Rosso	روصو / لگوارب	Trarza	70,403
Sebkha	السبخة	Nouakchott-Ouest	72,181
Sélibaby	سيلبابي	Guidimakha	99,118
Tamchekett	تامشكت	Hodh El Gharbi	43,936
Tékane	تيكان	Trarza	43,736
Tevragh Zeina	تفرغ زينة	Nouakchott-Ouest	74,942
Teyarett	تيارت	Nouakchott-Nord	123,658
Tichitt	تيشيت	Tagant	4,490
Tidjikja	تجكجة	Tagant	52,334
Timbédra	تمبدغة	Hodh Ech Chargui	112,796
Tintane	الطينطان	Hodh El Gharbi	98,188
Touil	اطويل	Hodh El Gharbi	47,578
Toujounine	توجنين	Nouakchott-Nord	303,882
Wompou	ومبو	Guidimakha	57,706
Zouérate	ازويرات	Tiris Zemmour	62,380

== See also ==
- Regions of Mauritania
- Geography of Mauritania
