= Keur Massene (department) =

Keur Massene كرمسين
- Department
- Location within Mauritania
- Country: Mauritania

Area
  - Total: 2,616 km^{2} (1,010 sq mi)

Population (2013 census)
  - Total: 26,760
  - Density: 10.23/km^{2} (26.49/sq mi)

Keur Massene is a department of Trarza Region in Mauritania.

== List of municipalities in the department ==
The Keur Massene department is made up of the following communes:

- Keur-Macene
- Mbalal
- Ndiago
