= Wildlife of Mauritania =

Mauritania's wildlife has two main influences as the country lies in two biogeographic realms. The north sits in the Palearctic which extends south from the Sahara to roughly 19° north latitude and the south is in the Afrotropic realm. Additionally, Mauritania is an important wintering area for numerous birds which migrate from the Palearctic.

== Faunal regions and habitats ==
Most of the north to about 19° north latitude is regarded as being in the Palearctic, and is largely made up of the Sahara desert and adjacent littoral habitats. South of this is regarded as being in the Afrotropical biogeographic realm, which means that species of a predominantly Afrotropical distribution dominate the fauna. South of the Sahara is the South Saharan steppe and woodlands ecoregion which integrates into the Sahelian acacia savanna ecoregion. The southernmost part of the country lies in the West Sudanian savanna ecoregion.

Wetlands are important and the two main protected areas are the Banc d'Arguin National Park which protects rich, shallow coastal and marine ecosystems which integrate with the arid Sahara desert and the Diawling National Park which forms the northern part of the delta of the Senegal River. Elsewhere in Mauritania wetlands are normally ephemeral and rely on the seasonal rainfall and may be very important for migratory birds.

== Mammals ==
Most of the larger mammal species have been extirpated from Mauritania. Among the antelopes the scimitar-horned oryx, addax, korrigum and dama gazelle are extinct, the bohor reedbuck, Buffon's kob, dorcas gazelle and red-fronted gazelle are extinct and the bushbuck and slender-horned gazelle are of indeterminate status. In the area of Diawling National Park, the last lion was shot in 1970 and there have been no sightings of manatees or hippopotamus in recent years. The Mediterranean monk seal has one of its last strongholds in the world in the coves along the Cap Blanc Peninsula near Nouadhibou. Common extant mammals include fennec fox, African golden wolves, warthogs, African wildcats, Cape hares and patas monkeys.

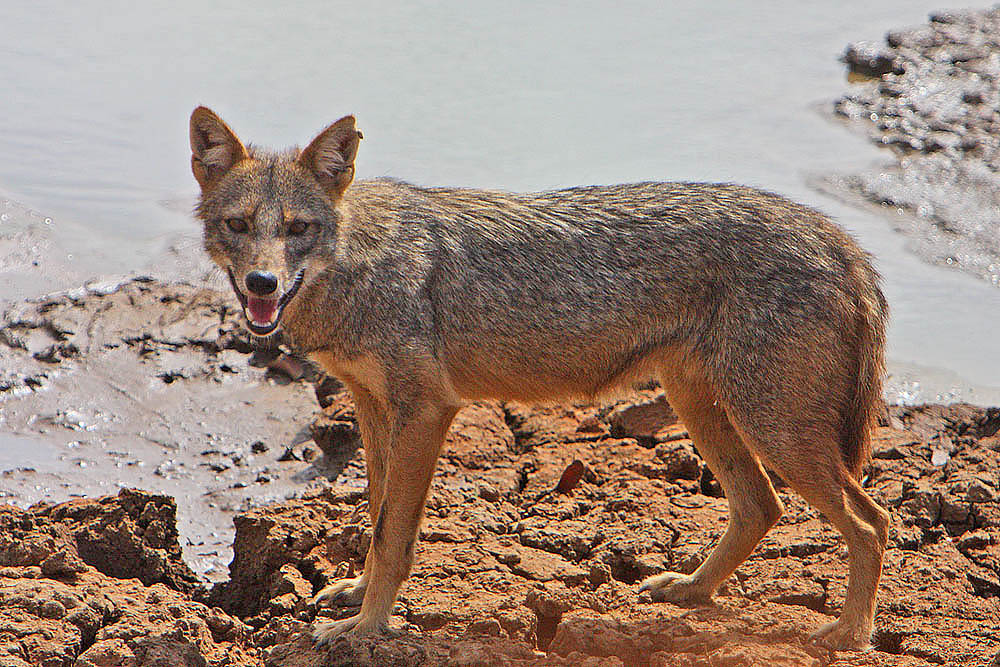
African golden wolf

The rich offshore waters of Mauritania are home to a diverse fauna of cetaceans. Upwellings off the coats create rich feeding grounds for baleen whales and these include blue whale, sei whale and Bryde's whale, although the North Atlantic right whale is now extinct in the eastern Atlantic, it was recorded off Mauritania. Other cetaceans found off Mauritania's coast include harbour porpoise, Atlantic spotted dolphin, bottlenose dolphin, sperm whale, short-finned pilot whale and orca.

== Birds ==
Over 500 species of bird have been recorded in Mauritania. Specialities and spectacular species include scissor-tailed kite, Nubian bustard, Arabian bustard, houbara bustard, Egyptian plover, golden nightjar, chestnut-bellied starling, Kordofan lark and Sudan golden sparrow.

The coastal wetlands are of immense importance for over two million wintering Western Palearctic waders, from fifteen different species including dunlin, bar-tailed godwit, curlew sandpiper and common redshank each numbering over 100,000 birds. Other wintering species include more than 30,000 greater flamingos. Breeding birds include great white pelican, reed cormorant, gull-billed tern, Caspian tern, royal tern and common tern, together with two unique subspecies of grey heron Ardea cinerea monicae and Eurasian spoonbill Platalea leucorodia balsaci and an outpost of the western reef heron.

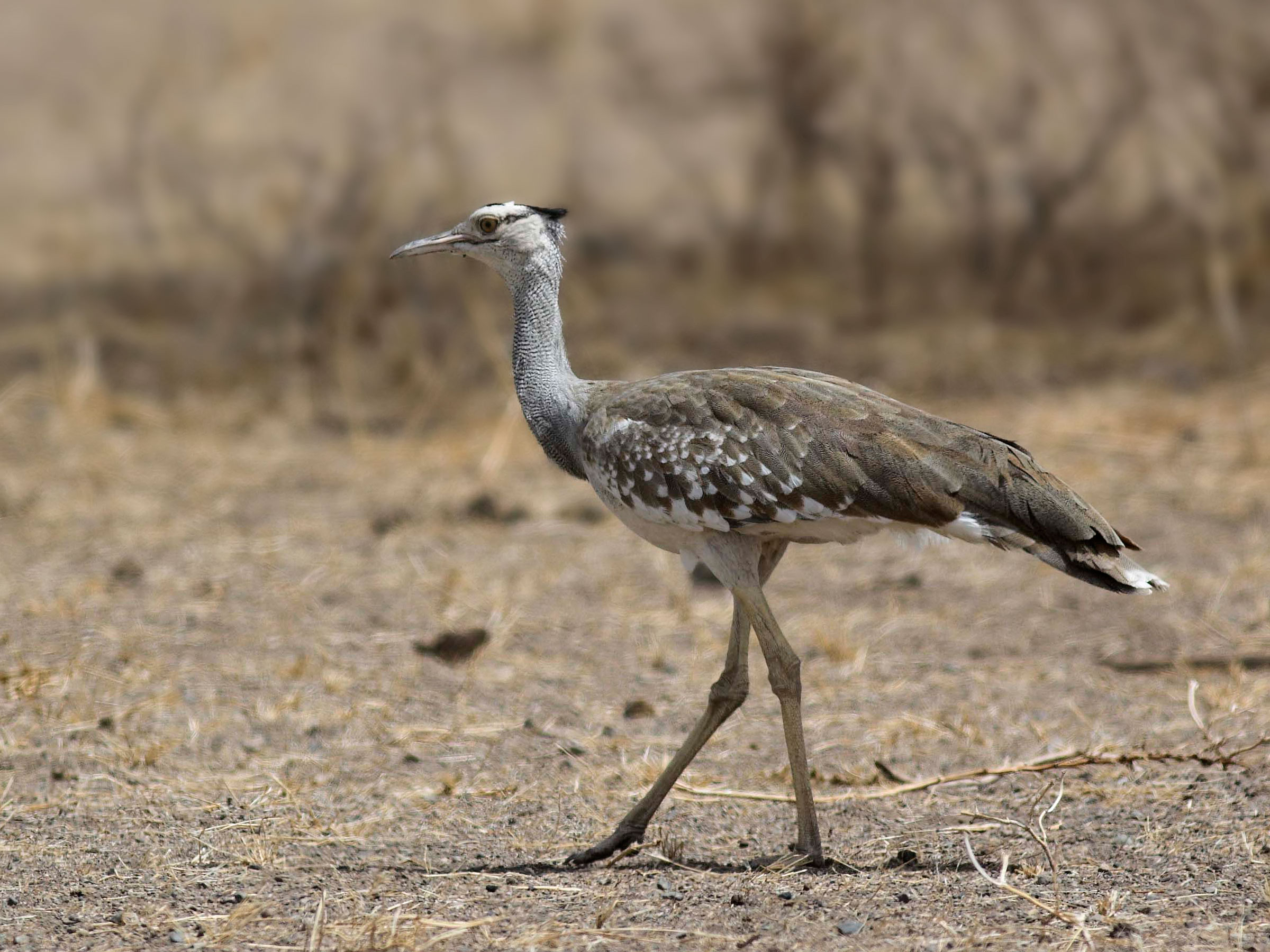
Arabian bustard

== Herpetofauna ==
The West African crocodile still exists in small numbers in Mauritania. Other reptiles found include the African chameleon, Senegal chameleon, Nile monitor, various geckos and other lizards, the Mali cobra and black-necked spitting cobra, African rock python, the desert horned viper and the Saharan sand viper, puff adders are among the snakes, as well as terrestrial, freshwater and marine turtles. In all 86 species of reptile in 21 families have been recorded in Mauritania. Eleven species of amphibian have been confirmed as occurring in Mauritania but another 19 are expected to be recorded, mainly in the south of the country.

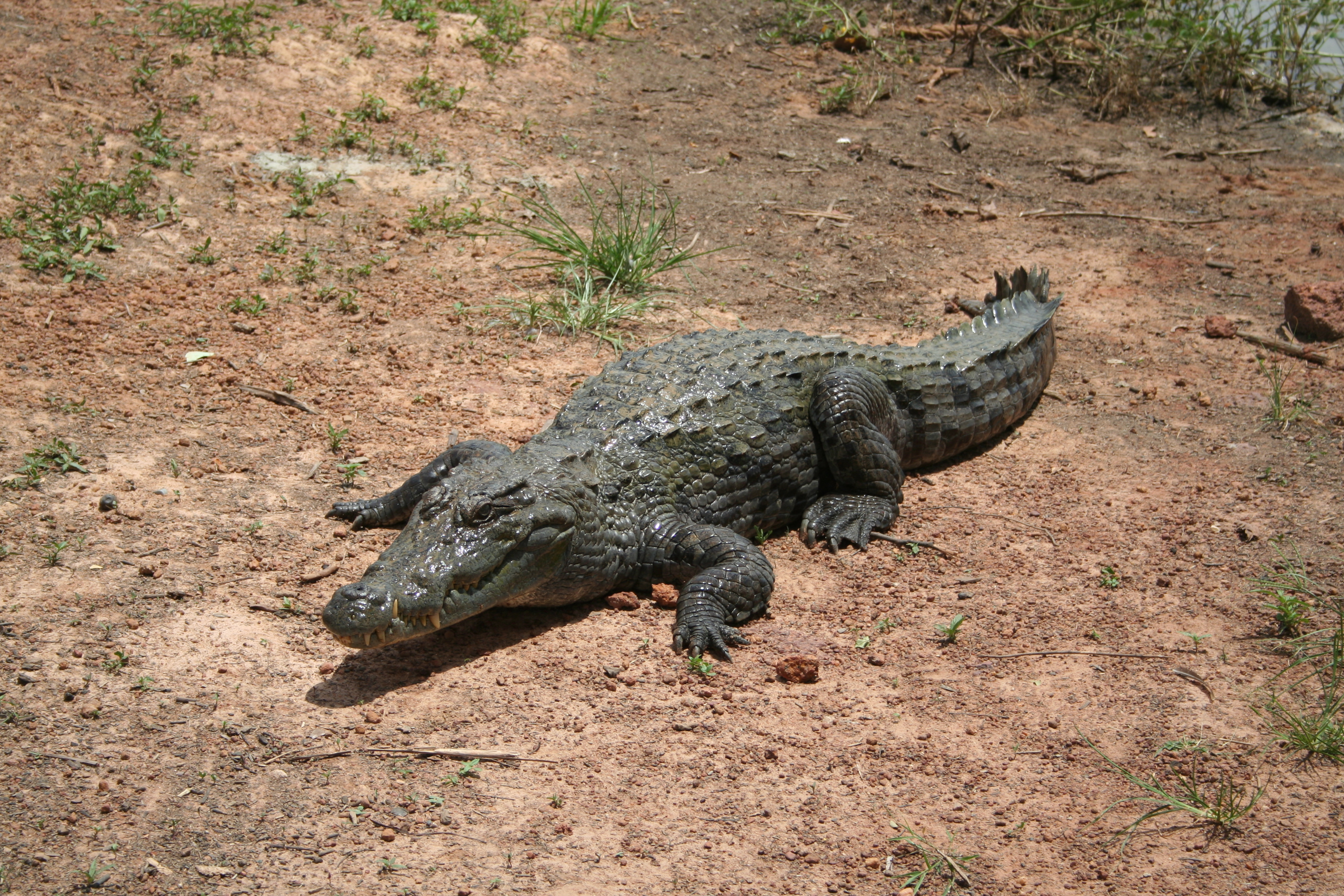
West African crocodile

== Fish ==
The marine fish found off Mauritania's coast are an important resource for commercial, subsistence and sport fishing. Estimates put the potential catch at between 400,000 and 700,000 tons. The rich waters off the Mauritanian coast are host to a variety of species more familiar in more northerly temperate waters such as European seabass, European hake, Norwegian skate and gilt-head bream, as well as species more typical of warmer waters including whale shark, Atlantic bluefin tuna, Atlantic sailfish, tarpon and Atlantic blue marlin. 56 species of freshwater fish have been reported from Mauritania of which 50 have been confirmed as occurring.

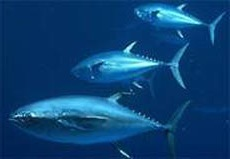
Bluefin tuna
