= Mbalal =

Coordinates: 16°39′18″N 16°00′36″W

- Commune and town
- Interactive map of Mbalal
- Country: Mauritania
- Region: Trarza
- Department: Keur Massene (department)

Population (2023)
  - Total: 18,290
- Time zone: UTC+0 (GMT)

Mbalal or M'Balel is a town and urban commune in the Trarza Region of south-western Mauritania.

In 2000, it had a population of 14,129. In 2023, it had a population of 18,290.
