= Southern patas monkey =

Conservation status
- Critically Endangered (IUCN 3.1)

Scientific classification
- Kingdom: Animalia
- Phylum: Chordata
- Class: Mammalia
- Infraclass: Placentalia
- Order: Primates
- Family: Cercopithecidae
- Genus: Erythrocebus
- Species: E. baumstarki

Binomial name
- Erythrocebus baumstarki Matschie, 1905
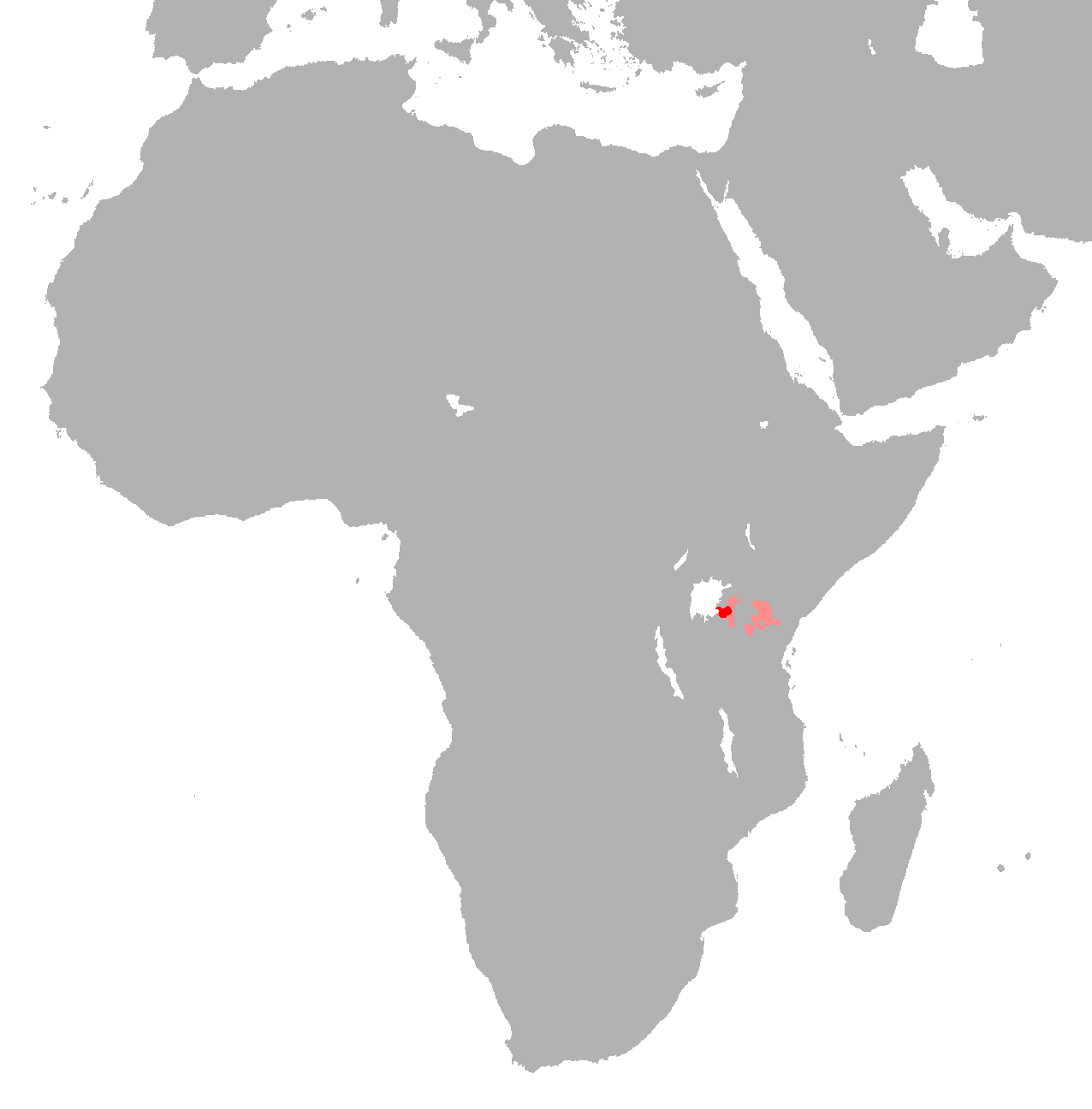
- Red: distribution after 2009 Pink: historic distribution in the early 20th century

Synonyms
- Erythrocebus patas baumstarki

Species of Old World monkey

The southern patas monkey (Erythrocebus baumstarki) is a critically endangered species of Old World monkey found only in Tanzania, and formerly in Kenya. It may be the most endangered primate in Africa known to still be extant, with only 100 to 200 known wild individuals.

== Taxonomy ==
This species was described in 1905, but later reclassified as a subspecies of the common patas monkey (E. patas). However, a 2017 review on variation and taxonomy in Erythrocebus supported reclassifying it as a distinct species based on its distinctive appearance and geographic separation from the other two species. This taxonomy was followed by the IUCN Red List and American Society of Mammalogists. Phylogenetic evidence has also affirmed E. baumstarki as being a distinct species. It is possible that due to its seemingly-relictual distribution at the fringe of the range of Erythrocebus, E. baumstarki may represent an ancient lineage of Erythrocebus that has been largely supplanted by E. patas throughout the rest of its range.

== Distribution ==
In the early 20th century, this species had a relatively small distribution in northern Tanzania and southern Kenya. Two major populations were known, separated by the Great Rift Valley: the Serengeti population, found west of the valley, and the Kilimanjaro population, found east of the valley. The Kilimanjaro population was the much larger of the two populations, ranging from Nairobi south to Lolkisale.

Over the following century, the population suffered a heavy decline; the Kilimanjaro population suffered the greatest losses despite originally being the larger population; the very last known individual, a deceased juvenile killed by domestic dogs, was recorded in 2011. Over the next several years, the species suffered further losses; the very last individual in Kenya, a lone individual sighted in Maasai Mara National Reserve, was recorded in 2015. The species' range in Tanzania had also continued to contract over the past 2 decades, and by 2021 it was restricted to the western Serengeti region.

== Habitat ==
This species inhabits semi-arid acacia woodland, primarily whistling thorn (Vachellia drepanolobium) woodland. The majority of its diet derives directly from the whistling thorn, with half of this deriving from the gum of the tree, and another half of this deriving from ants of the genus Crematogaster, which have a mutualistic relationship with the whistling thorn. The whistling thorn is primarily found above 500 meters above sea level and is not found below 200 meters, serving as a prominent altitudinal limit for E. baumstarki.

== Description ==
E. baumstarki is one of two known species of Erythrocebus with a black face and nose, at least in adult males, with the other being the Blue Nile patas monkey (E. poliocephalus).

== Status ==
E. baumstarki was likely never a common species; although it is difficult to observe, its core range is heavily visited by tourists and naturalists, and the very few historic specimens indicate that it was likely already rare when it was described in 1905. Following the dramatic declines over the 20th and early 21st centuries, this species is now exclusively restricted to protected areas. These remnant populations are thought to only total 100 to 200 total individuals, amounting to 50 to 100 mature individuals.

=== Threats ===
The largest threat to the species and the main driver of its decline is the heavy population growth in its home range, which, when combined with unsustainable use of natural resources, which has led to heavy habitat degradation, especially in V. drepanolobium woodlands. Many of these woodlands have been cleared for agriculture and livestock rearing, and remaining woodlands are frequently encroached upon by livestock, further degrading them.

The growing population in the region has also led to competition between wildlife and humans/livestock for drinking water. Erythrocebus species depend on permanent sources of drinking water, especially after the increasingly frequent periods of drought; however, many of these water sources have herders present all day long, putting the monkeys into conflict with herders and domestic dogs, who may kill monkeys. Lack of access to water and persecution at the available water sources is thought to be a major risk to the species. In addition, this species is frequently caught in snares from illegal poaching operations, despite not being a target species. These risks have all likely led to a decline in genetic diversity of the species, which may further threaten it.

Climate change may also be a potential threat due to it spurring a decrease in water availability and V. drepanolobium inhabiting specific altitudes that may decrease with warming, although its impact may be limited as patas monkeys have shown potential to adapt; due to this, human interactions likely serve as the greater threat to the species, and may magnify the effects climate change has on the species.

Aside from Miss Waldron's red colobus (Piliocolobus waldronae) and the Mount Kenya potto (Perodicticus ibeanus stockleyi), both of which may be potentially extinct already, the southern patas monkey could be the most endangered primate in Africa, and may potentially be the next to go extinct. Some estimates indicate that without conservation efforts, the species could go extinct before 2031.

=== Conservation ===
The lack of conservation actions for this species may be due to it being very poorly-known, as well as it previously being considered a subspecies of the common patas monkey rather than a distinct species of its own. Potential conservation actions include close monitoring of populations, working with local people to monitor groups, as well as stopping poaching, illegal livestock grazing, and keeping dogs out of protected areas. It has also been recommended that the species be added to The World's 25 Most Endangered Primates campaign. Despite the very low population and the future intensification of threats, the species may be able to recover if the threats are successfully mitigated.
