= Ndiago, Mauritania =

Ndiago
- Commune and town
- Location in Mauritania
- Coordinates: 16°10′N 16°30′W
- Country: Mauritania
- Region: Trarza

Population (2000)
  - Total: 8,440
- Time zone: UTC+0 (GMT)

Ndiago or N'Djiago is a town and urban commune in the Trarza Region of south-western Mauritania.

In 2000, it had a population of 8,440.

It is located in the Diawling National Park.
