= Rosso =

City in Trarza region, Mauritania

Rosso روصو
- Commune and city
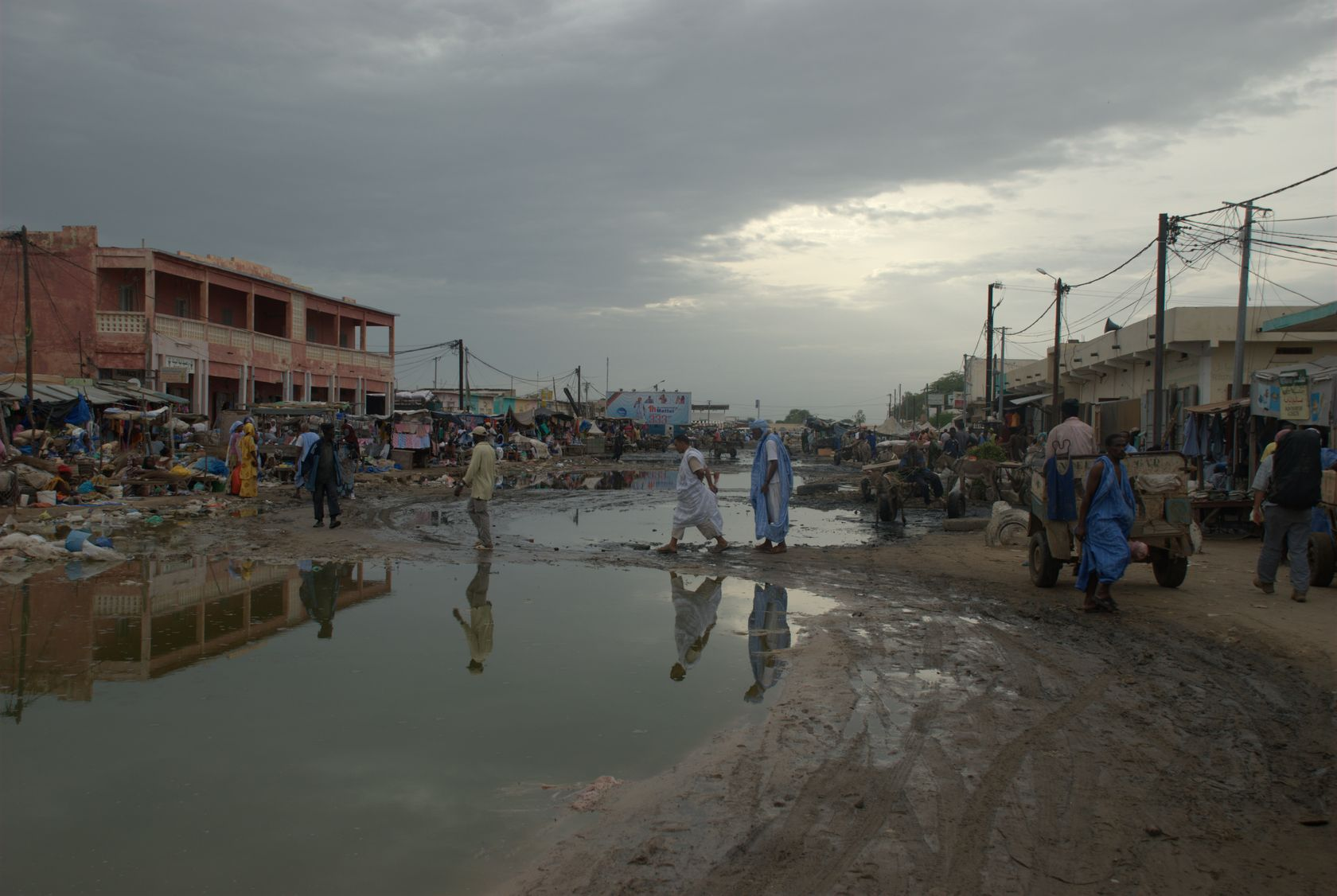
- Rosso Town Centre

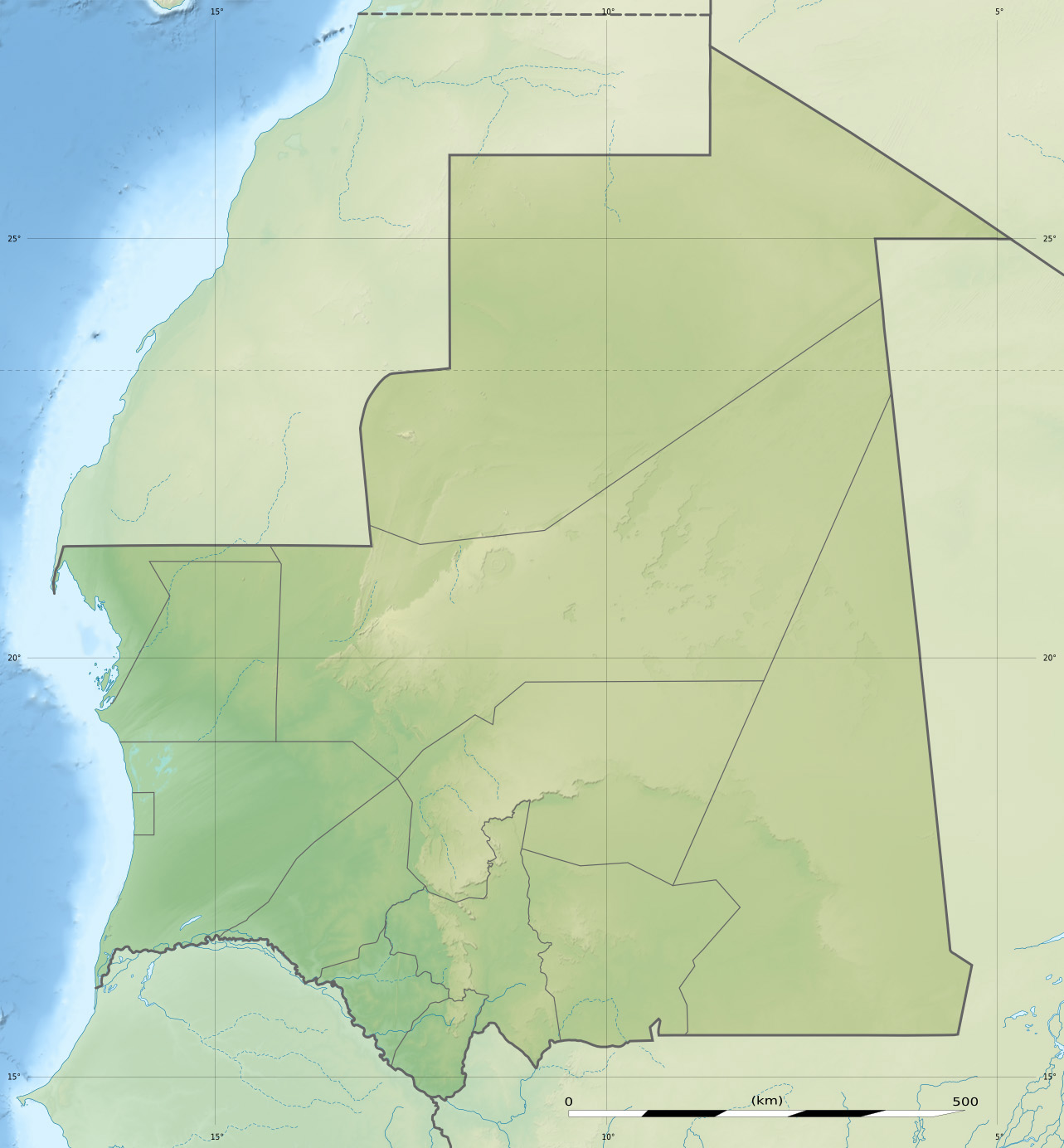
- Location in Mauritania
- Coordinates: 16°30′46″N 15°48′18″W
- Country: Mauritania
- Region: Trarza
- Department: Rosso (department)

Government
  - Mayor: Bamba Sidi Daramane
- Elevation: 6 m (20 ft)

Population (2023 census)
  - Commune and city: 61,156
  - Urban: 33,518 (2,013 census)
- Time zone: UTC+00:00 (GMT)

Rosso is the major city of south-western Mauritania and capital of Trarza region. It is situated on the Senegal River at the head of the river zone allowing year-round navigation.

The town is 204 km south of the capital Nouakchott.

== History ==
Rosso was once the capital of the Emirate of Trarza, a Precolonial Sahrawi State.

Under French colonial rule Senegal and Mauritania were administered as a single entity. When Independence came, the new frontier was drawn along the Senegal River, splitting the small town of Rosso in two. This article refers to Mauritanian Rosso, on the northern bank of the river.

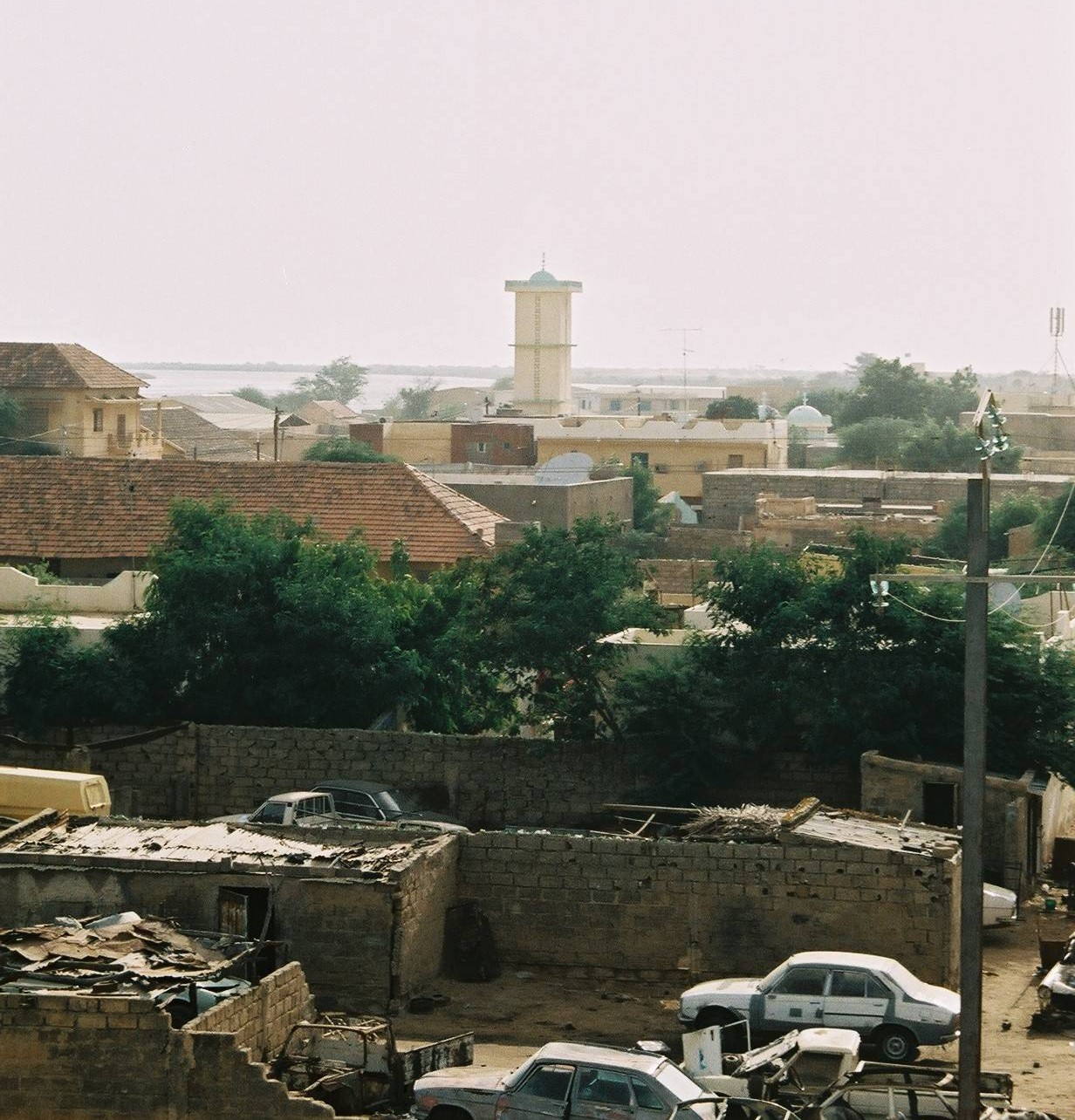
View over Rosso

Originally a staging-post for the gum arabic trade, Rosso has grown rapidly since independence.

In 1986, the town was elevated to the status of urban commune. The commune's population was 50,560 in 2013, with 33,518 living in the city of Rosso itself. Having grown from a mere 2,300 in 1960, it has now overtaken Kaédi to become the 3rd largest city in the country.

== Languages ==
Southwestern Mauritania is historically a predominantly Wolof-speaking area, but many members of Mauritania's other ethnic groups have moved to the town to escape the severe problems of desertification further north.

== Economy ==
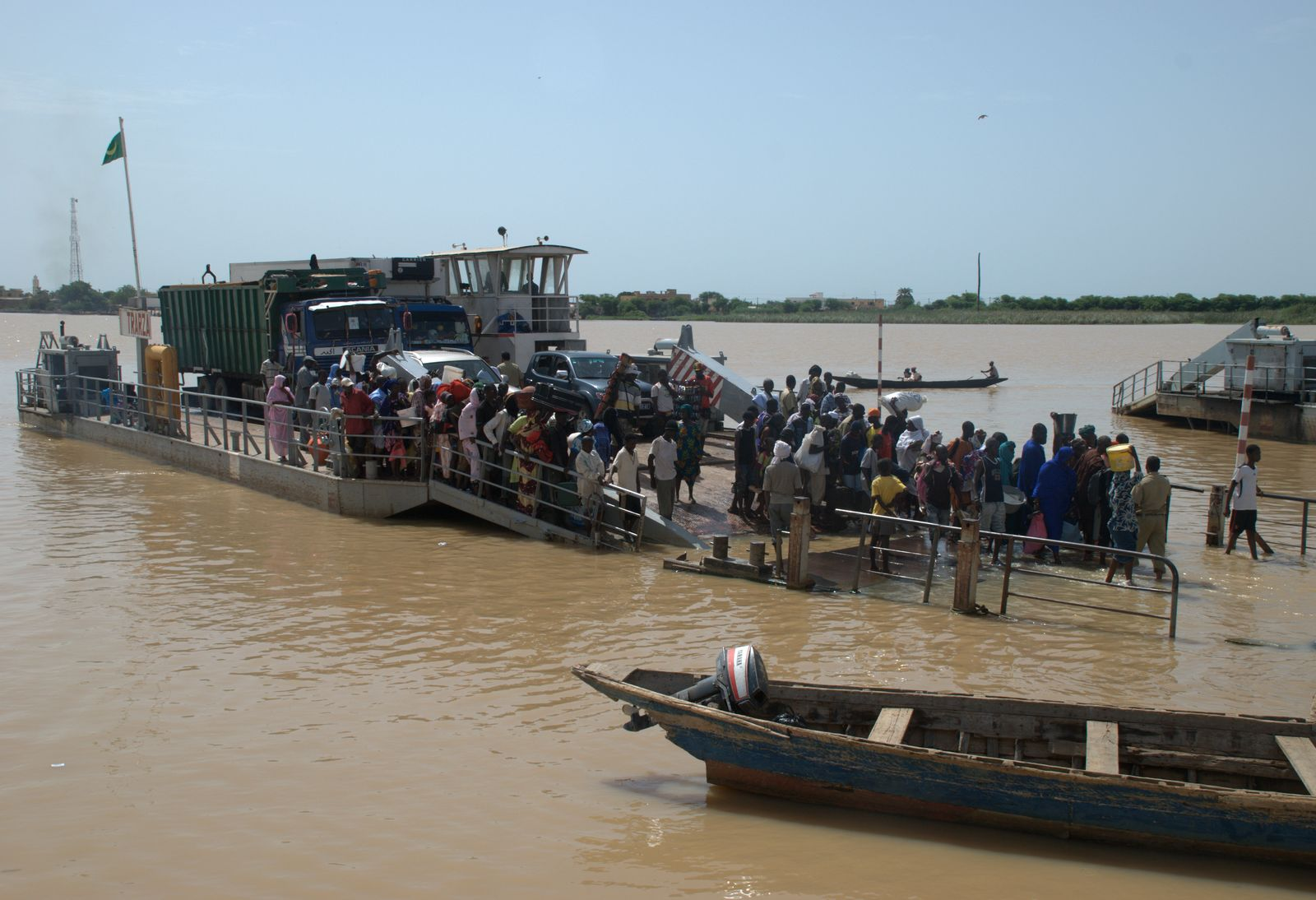
Locals catching the ferry in Rosso

Rosso occupies a strategic position at the international ferry-crossing on the main road between Nouakchott and the Senegalese capital of Dakar. Economically, the town has benefited, but its fortunes are very dependent on the state of relations between the two countries.

From 1990 to 1992, the border crossing was closed, due to the Mauritania–Senegal Border War, and there have been repeated movements of refugees in both directions through the town.

== Climate ==
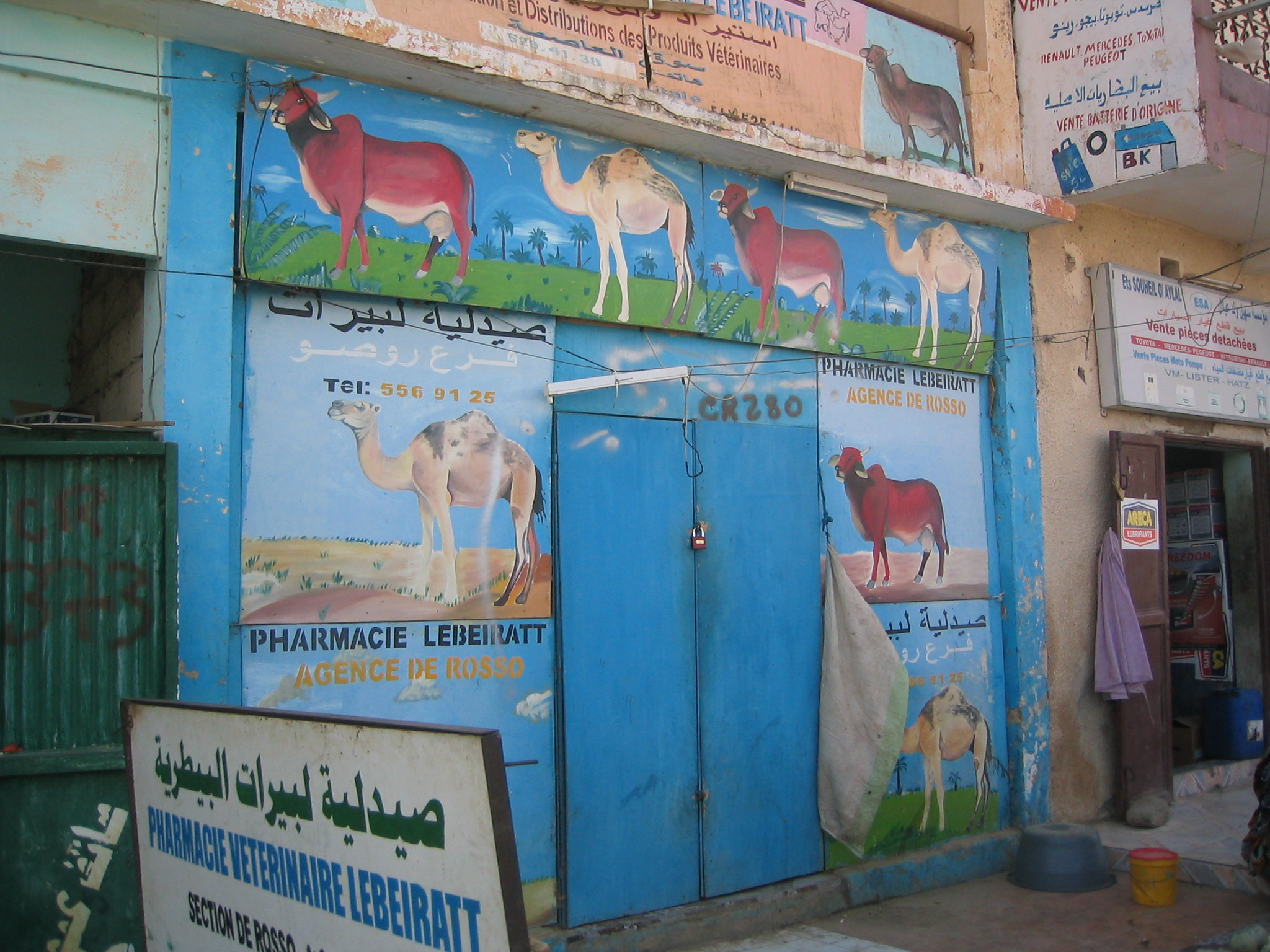
Rosso Veterinary

Rosso has a hot desert climate (Köppen climate classification BWh). Rosso has the highest annual rainfall in the country, at 300mm/yr, and is one of the market towns which serve the narrow strip of agricultural land stretching along the southern frontier of Mauritania. But even here the Sahara is encroaching. Major irrigation projects have been carried out on the northern bank of the Senegal River, financed by the United Arab Emirates, allowing an expansion in the production of cash crops such as mint.

In 2004, however up to 80% of crops were lost as a result of the infestation of locusts which affected the whole of the western Sahel. This was followed by a severe drought. It was a bitter irony then that in August 2005, some 10,000 people were displaced by flooding.

Climate data for Rosso
Month	Jan	Feb	Mar	Apr	May	Jun	Jul	Aug	Sep	Oct	Nov	Dec	Year
Record high °C (°F)	37 (99)	42 (108)	43 (109)	45 (113)	45 (113)	45 (113)	45 (113)	43 (109)	42 (108)	45 (113)	42 (108)	40 (104)	45 (113)
Mean daily maximum °C (°F)	29 (84)	32 (90)	33 (91)	36 (97)	37 (99)	36 (97)	34 (93)	34 (93)	35 (95)	36 (97)	33 (91)	30 (86)	34 (93)
Daily mean °C (°F)	23 (73)	26 (79)	27 (81)	28 (82)	30 (86)	31 (88)	30 (86)	30 (86)	30 (86)	31 (88)	25 (77)	25 (77)	28 (82)
Mean daily minimum °C (°F)	17 (63)	19 (66)	20 (68)	21 (70)	23 (73)	25 (77)	25 (77)	26 (79)	26 (79)	25 (77)	22 (72)	18 (64)	22 (72)
Record low °C (°F)	8 (46)	11 (52)	11 (52)	11 (52)	12 (54)	13 (55)	20 (68)	22 (72)	19 (66)	16 (61)	11 (52)	7 (45)	7 (45)
Average precipitation days	1	1	0	0	0	0	2	4	3	1	0	1	13

== Recreation ==
The city is near the Diawling National Park. Rosso is also known for the internationally renowned Satara Zone Housing project. A small library, set up by the local Catholic priest, has been functioning since 2005.

A technology institute - ISET - was opened in 2009, offering courses in agriculture.

== Politics ==
The former mayor, Professor Yerim Fassa, a doctor, was elected in 2007. The current mayor is named Bamba Sidi Daramane.

Rosso has been twinned with Moissy-Cramayel since 1986.

From August 2007 through May 2009, Michael Auerbach - Regional Coordinator for the United States Peace Corps - resided in Rosso as he evaluated the efficacy of existing gender equality movements in the region. He was succeeded by Brandon Forester, the final Regional Coordinator for the United States Peace Corps Program until the total closure of the program in 2010.

== Notable people ==
- Mamadou Idrissa Wade (born 1985), footballer
- Mohamedou Ould Slahi (born 1970), writer and former detainee of Guantánamo Bay detention camp.
- Boubacar Ould Messaoud (born 1945 - died 2026), human rights activist
