= Mauritania–Senegal border =

International border

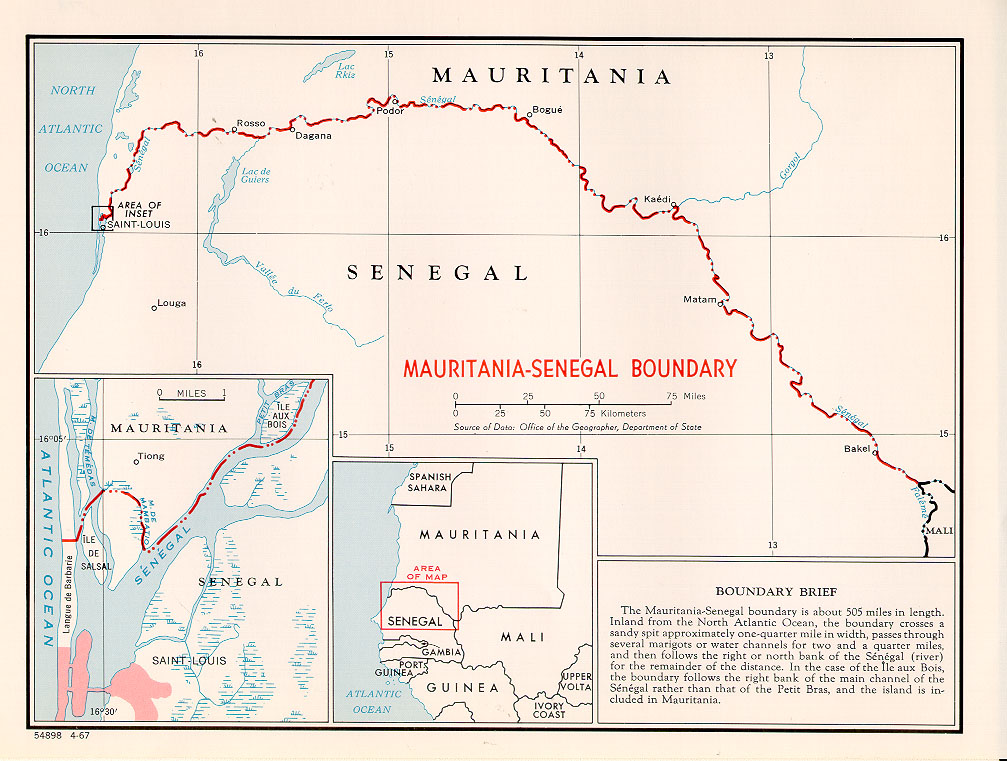
Map of the Mauritania-Senegal border.

The Mauritania–Senegal border is 742 km (461 mi) in length and runs from the Atlantic Ocean in the west along the Senegal River to the tripoint with Mali in the east.

== Description ==
The border starts in the west at the Atlantic coast and then goes east, crossing the Langue de Barbarie spit, and then veers north, utilizing the Marigot de Mambatio, before reaching the Senegal river. The border then follows this river eastwards in a broad arc, terminating at the Mali tripoint at the Senegal/Falémé confluence.

== History ==
France had begun settling on the coasts of modern Mauritania and Senegal in the 17th-18th centuries, gradually extended their rule further inland as far as modern Mali during the 1850s-80s. As a result of the ‘Scramble for Africa’ in the 1880s, France gained control the upper valley of the Niger River (roughly equivalent to the areas of modern Mali and Niger). France occupied this area in 1900, followed by Mauritania in 1903–04. Mali (then referred to as French Sudan) was originally included, along with modern Niger and Burkina Faso, within the Upper Senegal and Niger colony, however it was later split off and, along with Mauritania, became a constituent of the federal colony of French West Africa (Afrique occidentale française, abbreviated AOF). The following year on 25 February 1905 France created a border between Senegal and Mauritania along the Senegal river, which was then described in more detail in a decree of 8 December 1933.

As the movement for decolonization grew in the post-Second World War era, France gradually granted more political rights and representation for their sub-Saharan African colonies, culminating in the granting of broad internal autonomy to French West Africa in 1958 within the framework of the French Community. In 1960, both Mauritania and Senegal gained independence, and their mutual frontier became an international one between two states.

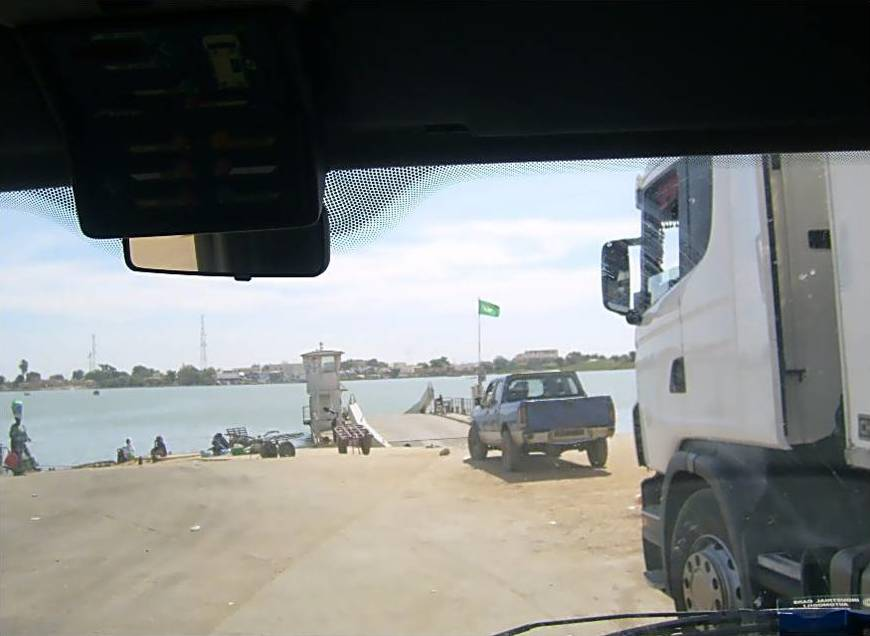
Border crossing at Rosso

Relations between the two states, initially fairly good, deteriorated in the 1980s due to various disputes along the Senegal river, exacerbated by droughts and ethnic tension. The disputes erupted into armed clashes along the frontier in 1989, resulting in a war that ended in 1991.

== Settlements near the border ==
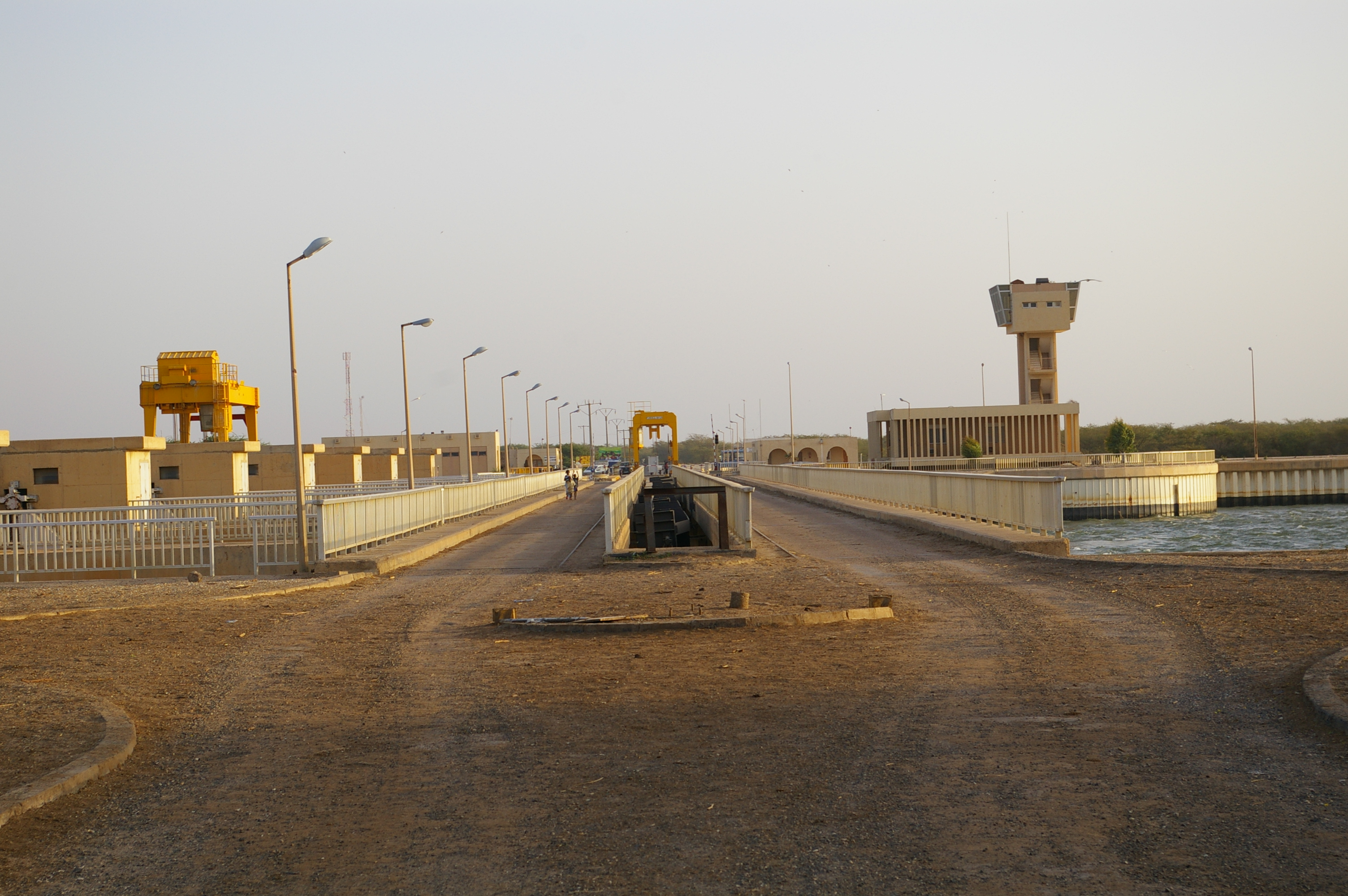
Border crossing

=== Mauritania ===
- Keur-Macene
- Rosso
- Ngorel
- Boghé
- Tjide
- Bababé
- Mbotto
- Mbagne
- Ouoloum Nere
- Kaédi
- Djowol
- Sagne

=== Senegal ===
- Saint-Louis
- Debi
- Rheune
- Ntiagar
- Dagana
- Podor
- Boki
- Sioure
- Cascas
- Doungel
- Saldé
- Matam
- Bakel
- Aroundou

== See also ==
- Mauritania–Senegal relations
