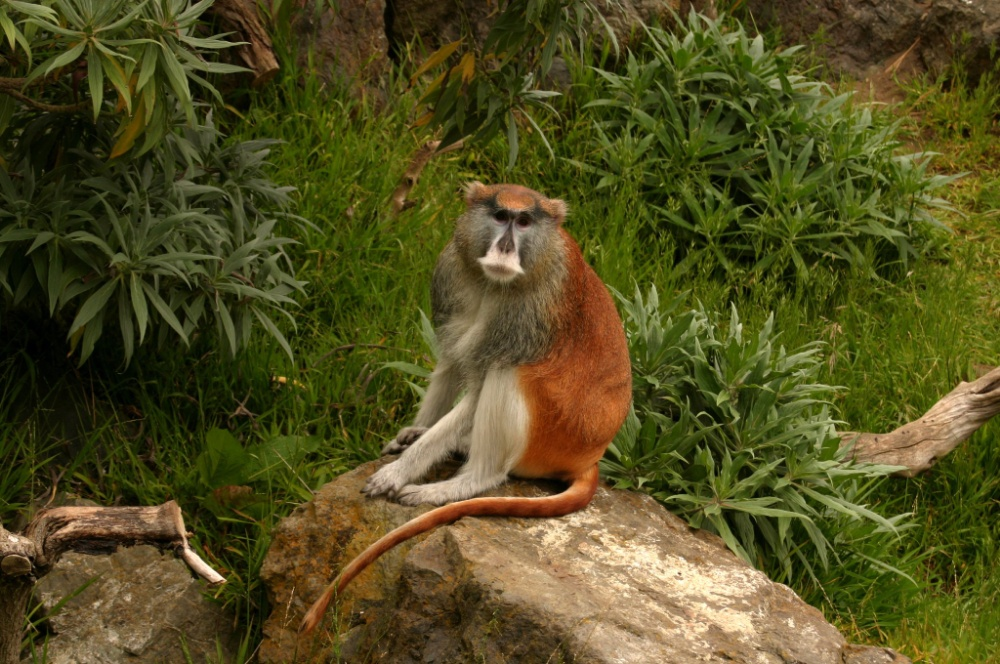
- E. patas

Scientific classification
- Kingdom: Animalia
- Phylum: Chordata
- Class: Mammalia
- Infraclass: Placentalia
- Order: Primates
- Family: Cercopithecidae
- Subfamily: Cercopithecinae
- Tribe: Cercopithecini
- Genus: Erythrocebus; Trouessart, 1897

Type species
- Simia patas Schreber, 1775

Species
- Erythrocebus baumstarki; Erythrocebus patas; Erythrocebus poliophaeus
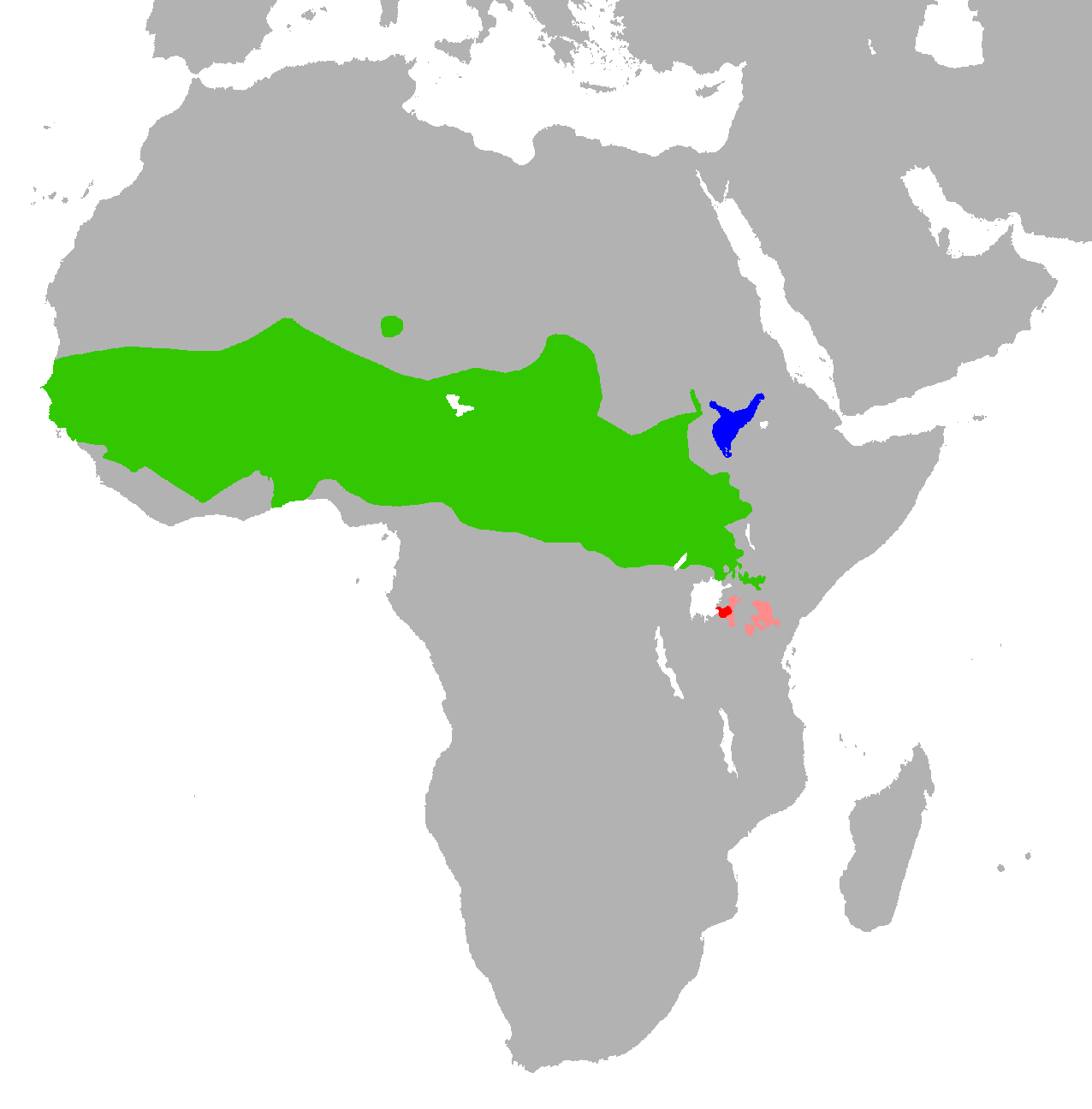
- Distribution of: Red: Erythrocebus baumstarki; Green: Erythrocebus patas; Blue: Erythrocebus poliophaeus

= Erythrocebus =

Genus of Old World monkeys

Erythrocebus is a genus of Old World monkey. All three species in this genus are found in Africa, and are known as patas monkeys. While previously considered a monotypic genus containing just E. patas, a 2017 review argued that, based on morphological evidence and heavy geographic separation between taxa, E. patas should be split back into distinct species as recognised in the 19th century.

There are three species recognized.

Genus Erythrocebus – Trouessart, 1897 – three species
Common name	Scientific name and subspecies	Range	Size and ecology	IUCN status and estimated population
Blue Nile patas monkey	E. poliophaeus (Reichenbach, 1862)	Eastern Africa	Size: 49–64 cm (19–25 in) long, plus 43–73 cm (17–29 in) tail Habitat: Forest, savanna, and shrubland Diet: Gum and arthropods, as well as flowers, fruit, seeds, leaves, stems, roots, and small vertebrates	DD Unknown
Common patas monkey	E. patas (Schreber, 1775) Three subspecies: E. p. patas; E. p. pyrrhonotus; E. p. villiersi	Equatorial Africa	Size: 50–70 cm (20–28 in) long, plus 50–70 cm (20–28 in) tail Habitat: Forest, savanna, shrubland, and grassland Diet: Fruit and insects, as well as leaves, roots, and bird eggs	NT Unknown
Southern patas monkey	E. baumstarki Matschie, 1905	Eastern Africa	Size: 49–64 cm (19–25 in) long, plus 43–73 cm (17–29 in) tail Habitat: Forest, savanna, shrubland, and grassland Diet: Gum and arthropods, as well as flowers, fruit, seeds, leaves, stems, roots, and small vertebrates	CR 100

== Sources ==
- Kingdon, Jonathan (2014). Mammals of Africa. Vol. II: Primates. A & C Black. ISBN 978-1-4081-8991-7.
