= Mamadou Idrissa Wade =

Mauritanian footballer

Personal information
- Full name: Mamadou Idrissa Wade
- Date of birth: 9 June 1985 (age 41)
- Place of birth: Rosso, Mauritania
- Position: Defender

Team information
- Current team: Nouadhibou

Senior career*
Years	Team	Apps	(Gls)
2006–2013	Concorde		
2013–	Nouadhibou		

International career^{‡}
2010–2016	Mauritania	27	(0)
- * Club domestic league appearances and goals ‡ National team caps and goals as of 31 August 2017

Mamadou Idrissa Wade (born 9 June 1985) is a Mauritanian footballer who plays as a defender for Nouadhibou and until 2016 the Mauritania national team.

== International career ==
Wade made his debut for Mauritania on 11 August 2010 against Palestine.

== Career statistics ==
=== International ===
Statistics accurate as of match played 31 August 2017

Mauritania national team
Year	Apps	Goals
2010	1	0
2012	2	0
2013	5	0
2014	6	0
2015	6	0
2016	4	0
2017	3	0
Total	27	0

== Honours ==
- Ligue 1 Mauritania: winner (2007–08, 2013–14)
- Coupe du Président de la République: winner (2009)
