= Keur-Macene =

- Commune and town
- Location in Mauritania
- Coordinates: 16°33′N 16°14′W
- Country: Mauritania
- Region: Trarza

Population (2000)
  - Total: 6,408
- Time zone: UTC+0 (GMT)

Keur-Macene or Keurmacen is a town and urban commune in the Trarza Region of south-western Mauritania, located on the border with Senegal.

In 2000, it had a population of 6,408.
