= Mauritania–Senegal relations =

- Mauritania: Senegal

Mauritania–Senegal relations are the foreign relations between Mauritania and Senegal, two neighboring countries in West Africa.

== History ==
In the years following Independence, Mauritania's principal friend in sub-Saharan Africa was Senegal, although the two countries have espoused different strategies for development. The growing split between blacks and Maures in Mauritania has, however, affected ties with Senegal, which sees itself as championing the rights of Mauritania's black minority. Under Taya, relations between the two countries were correct, even though each accused the other of harboring exiled dissidents.

In May 1987, Senegal extradited Captain Moulaye Asham Ould Ashen, a former black member of the Haidalla government accused of corruption, but only after veiled threats from Nouakchott that failure to do so would result in Mauritania's allowing Senegalese dissidents a platform from which to speak out against the government of President Abdou Diouf.

At the same time, Senegal and Mauritania have cooperated successfully with Mali under the Senegal River Development Office (Organisation pour la Mise en Valeur du Fleuve Sénégal—OMVS), which was formed in 1972 as a flood control, irrigation, and agricultural development project.

A border war was fought between the two nations.

== See also ==
- Mauritanians in Senegal
