= Sioure =

- Town
- Location within Senegal
- Coordinates: 16°27′N 14°08′W
- Country: Senegal
- Region: Saint-Louis Region
- Department: Podor Department
- Time zone: UTC+0 (GMT)

Sioure is a town in the Podor Department of the Saint-Louis Region in Senegal, West Africa. It is situated on the left bank of the Senegal River, located on the border with Mauritania, on the island of Morfil about 250 km (150 miles) from the Atlantic Ocean.

Sioure has an estimated population of 2,550, all of whom are Haal'Pulaar'en or speakers of the Fula language, Pulaar.

The main economic activities are farming, both arable and pastoral, and fishing. Formerly, the arable farming was based around the flooding of the river in the wet season, and involved beans, potatoes and tomatoes. Since the droughts of the 1970s, most farming is now in irrigated fields, and the main crops are rice, corn and sorghum.

The town has a school with six classes, a health centre and a mosque.

== Sources ==
The facts in this article are taken from the French language Wikipedia article: Sioure
