= Boubacar Ould Messaoud =

Mauritanian human rights activist (1945–2026)

Boubacar Ould Messaoud (15 May 1945 – 12 March 2026) was a Mauritanian human rights activist. He fought against slavery in Mauritania.

Messaoud was born on 15 May 1945 in Rosso, Mauritania. In 1995, he founded SOS Esclaves to fight against and to wipe out slavery from his country. In 1981, slavery was officially abolished but it continued in many forms for many more years.

Messaoud died at his home in Nouakchott, Mauritania, on 12 March 2026, at the age of 80.

== Awards ==
In 2009, Anti-Slavery International bestowed its Anti-Slavery Award on SOS Esclaves, and Messaoud received the award on his organization's behalf. In 2010, he won France's Human Rights Prize. In 2023, Messaoud received the Officer of the National Order of Merit medal.
