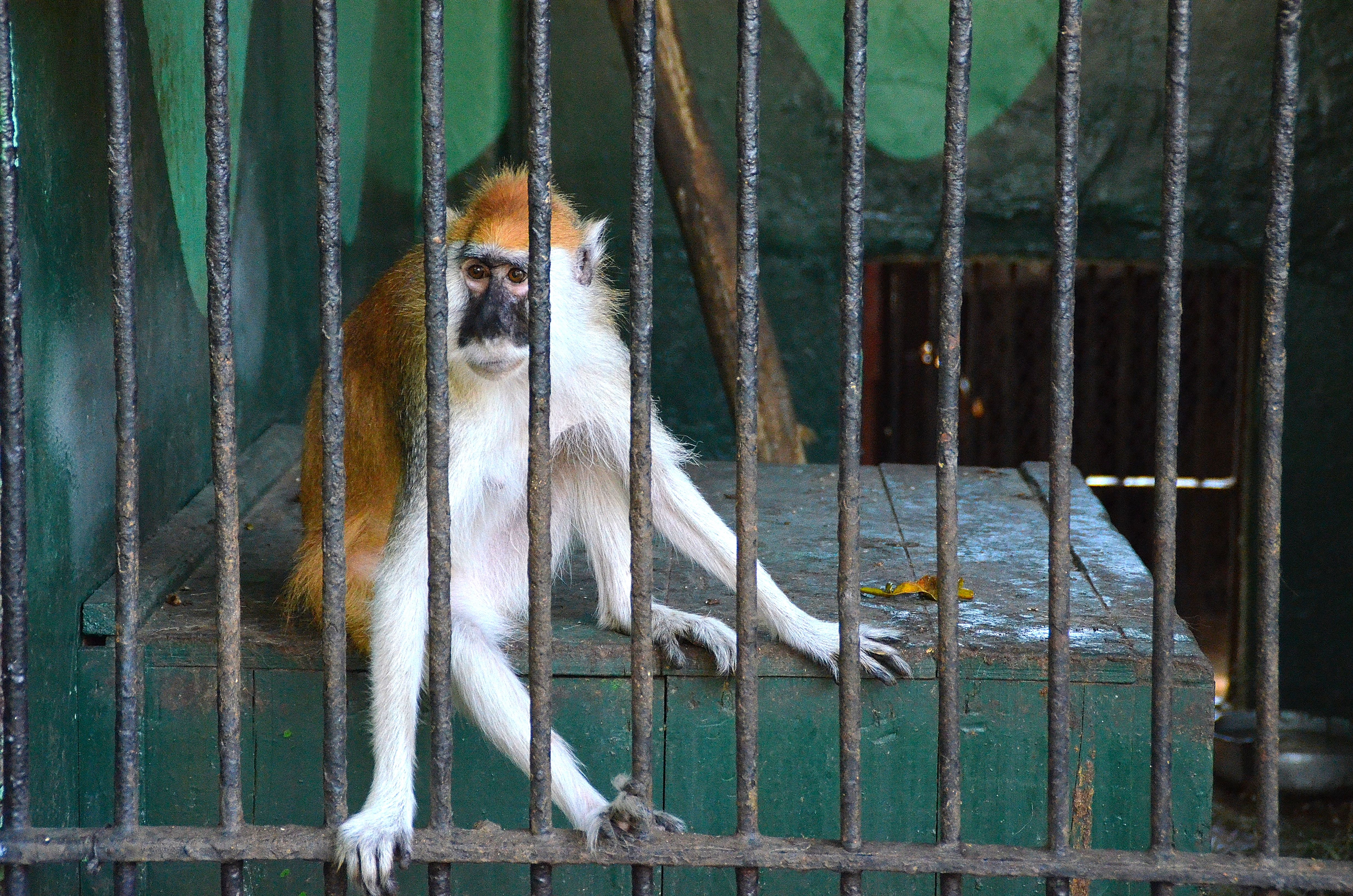
- At Giza Zoo

Conservation status
- Data Deficient (IUCN 3.1)

Scientific classification
- Kingdom: Animalia
- Phylum: Chordata
- Class: Mammalia
- Infraclass: Placentalia
- Order: Primates
- Family: Cercopithecidae
- Genus: Erythrocebus
- Species: E. poliophaeus

Binomial name
- Erythrocebus poliophaeus Reichenbach, 1862
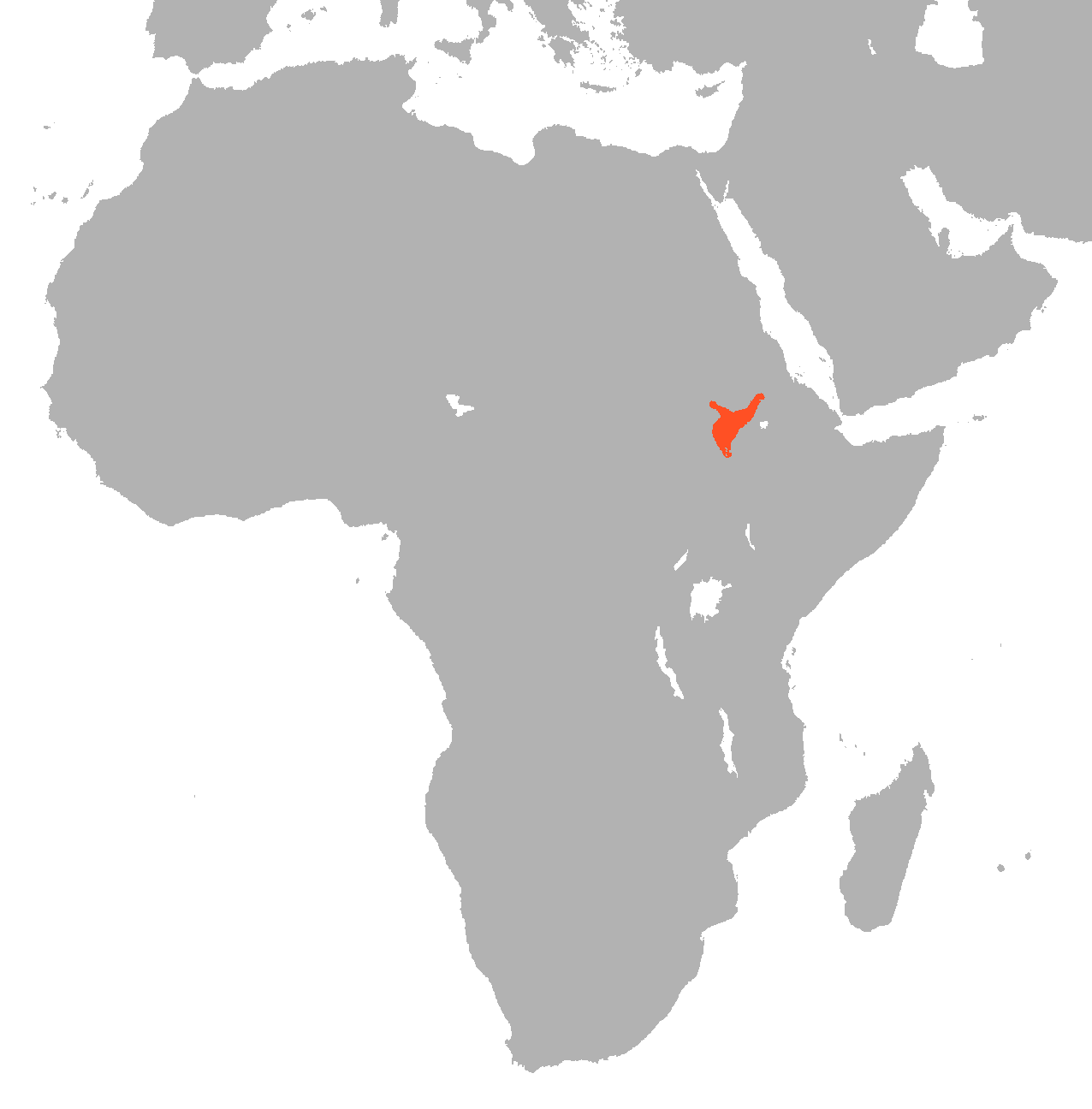

= Blue Nile patas monkey =

Species of Old World monkey

The Blue Nile patas monkey (Erythrocebus poliophaeus) or Heuglin's patas monkey is a species of Old World monkey found in Africa along the Blue Nile river valley in Ethiopia, Sudan, and potentially South Sudan. While first described in 1862, it was synonymized with the common patas monkey (E. patas) in 1927. A 2017 study reclassified it as a distinct species.

== Taxonomy ==
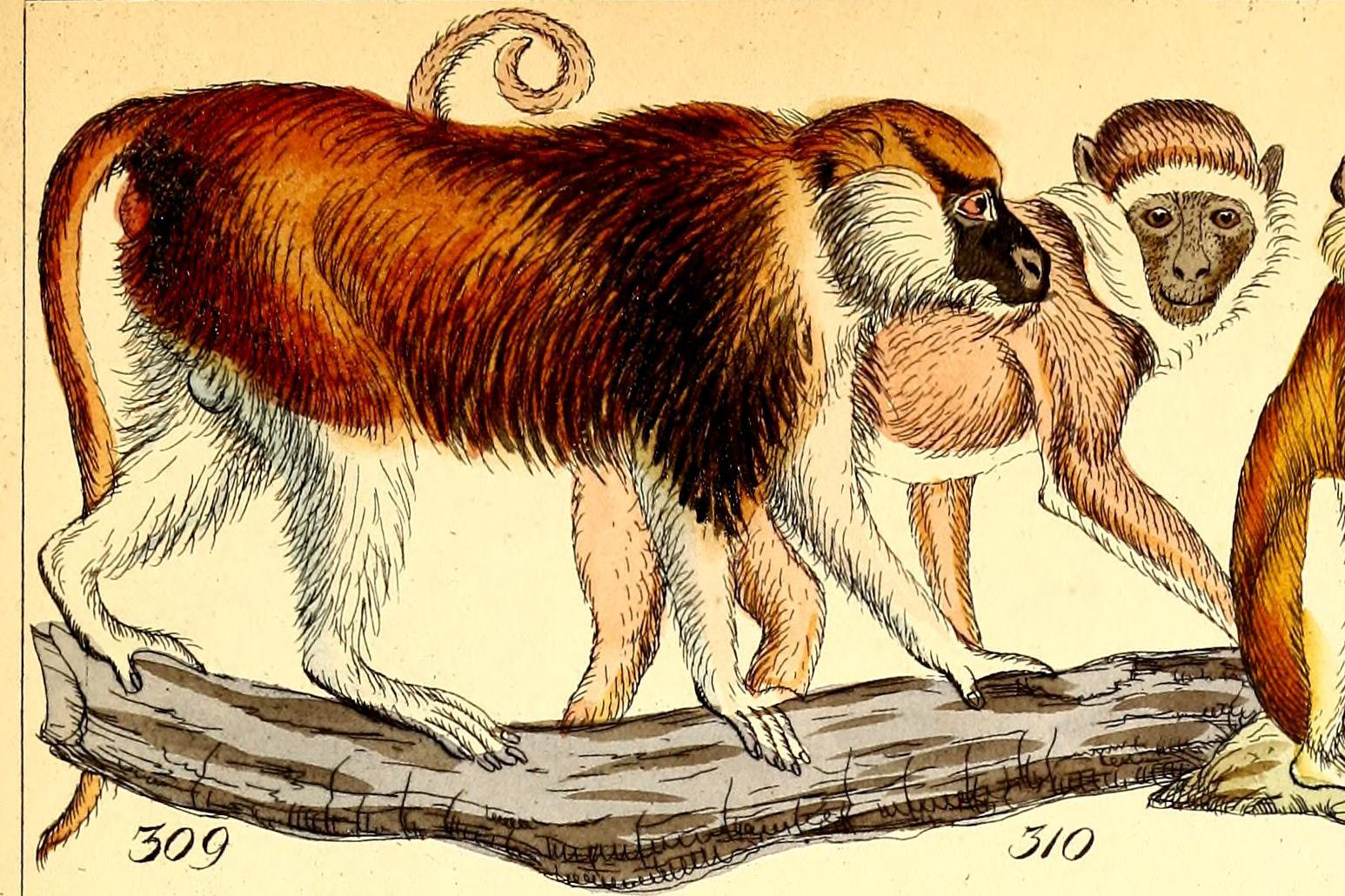
Illustration by Ludwig Reichenbach

The species was described in 1862 by Heinrich Gottlieb Ludwig Reichenbach. Reichenbach's description was based on a live specimen from Fazogli and a skin from the vicinity of the White Nile, both received by Theodor von Heuglin, with a captive adult in Cairo confirming the species as distinct to him. However, in the first widely adopted taxonomy for Erythrocebus by Schwartz (1927), all Erythrocebus monkeys were classified into three subspecies: patas, pyrrhonotus and baumstarki, creating a monotypic genus. This led to the synonymization of E. poliophaeus with E. patas. In 2017, Spartaco Gippoliti resurrected E. poliophaeus as a separate species based on its distinctive appearance and notable geographic separation from E. patas, with the IUCN Red List and American Society of Mammalogists also recognizing it as a distinct species.

Conventionally, researchers apply ssp. pyrrhonotus to all patas monkeys from northeastern Africa, including Sudan, Ethiopia, Kenya and Uganda. Gippoliti restricted the name poliophaeus from those populations found in northwestern Ethiopia and eastern Sudan.

== Distribution ==
This species is thought to be restricted to the area between the Nile and the western escarpment of the Great Rift Valley. It ranges from the vicinity of Metemma south to the Sudd. Although it is only known from Ethiopia and Sudan, it could potentially occur in South Sudan.

In prehistoric times, this species may have had its range restricted to a montane refugium in western Ethiopia, through which it survived a period of aridification.

== Description ==
This species has white hairs on upper lip hair which forms the shape of a handlebar moustache. This, when combined with the lack of the band between the ear and eye found in other members of Erythrocebus, distinguishes it from the rest of the genus.

== Threats ==
Little historical data and few museum voucher specimens exist of this species from Ethiopia, indicating that it was likely never common there. Although no specific threats are known, this species is likely at threat from human activities in its range. The villagization program in the 1980s saw large amounts of people being forcibly relocated into planned villages, including those built in the restricted range of E. poliophaeus. The subsequent residential development and agricultural expansion in its habitat may leave the species at heavy risk. The illegal wildlife trade in live animals also threatens this species and has been shown to lead to rapid population declines. However, as its geographic range is poorly known, it is classified as Data Deficient.
