= Diawling National Park =

National park in Mauritania

- IUCN category II (national park)
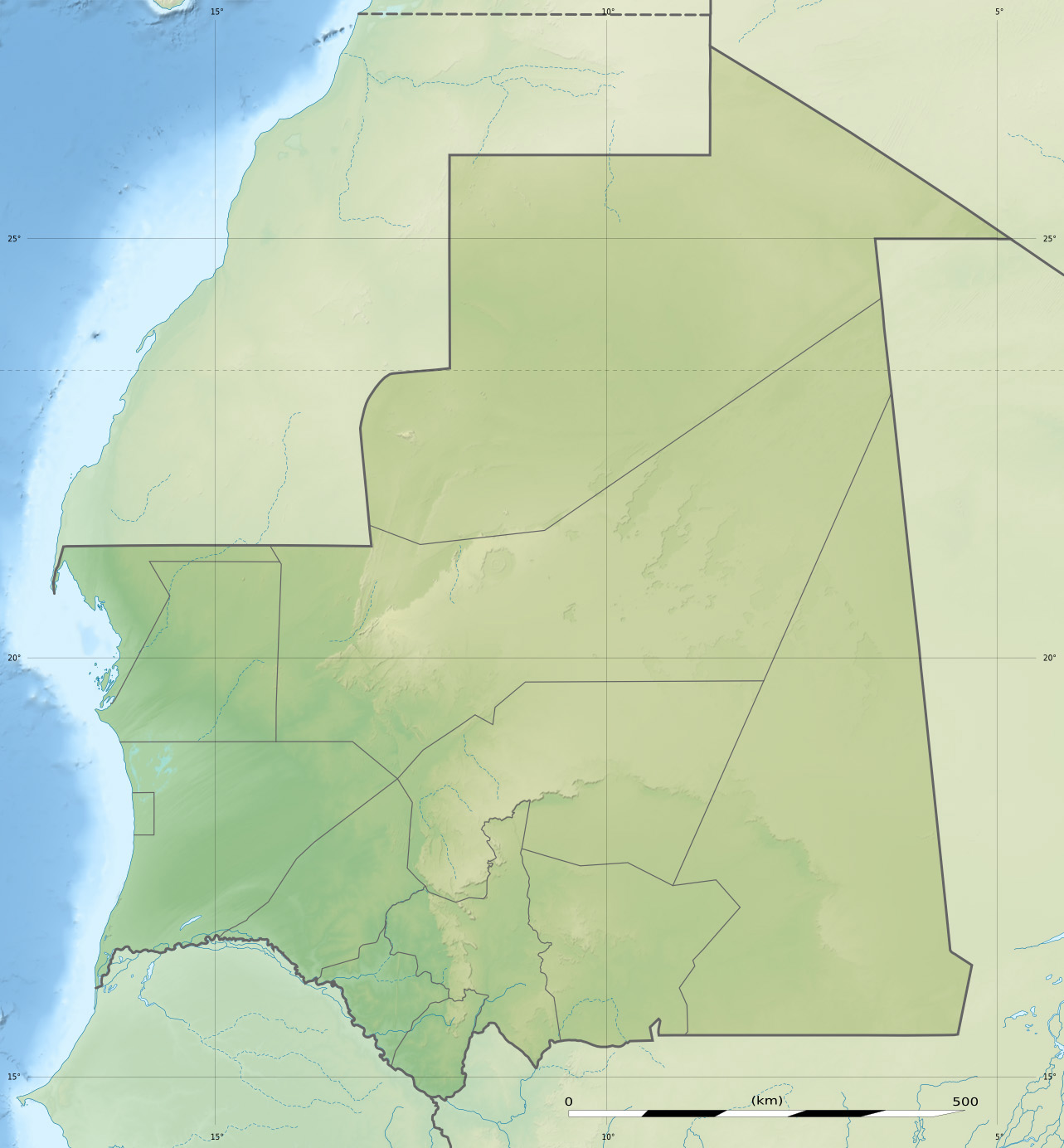
- Location within Mauritania
- Location: Mauritania
- Coordinates: 16°22′N 16°23′W
- Area: 15,600 hectares (39,000 acres)

Ramsar Wetland
- Official name: Parc National du Diawling
- Designated: 23 August 1994
- Reference no.: 666

Diawling National Park is a National park of Mauritania. It lies in south-west of the country around the Senegal River delta. The park is an important wildlife sanctuary.

== History ==
The park was established in 1991. Opposition to its establishment came mainly from the local inhabitants, who feared a similar fate as that of the populace of Djoudj, over the river in Senegal, when the Djoudj National Bird Sanctuary was established in 1971. They were fearful of the consequences of a protected area, which would mean that grazing and fishing would be prohibited or limited, ending a way of life that their tribes had always known.

== Geography ==
The park sprawls over an area of 16,000 hectares, all of which was once a floodplain. The Senegal River acts like a boundary between the park and in Senegal. It is part of a Trans-Border Biosphere Reserve that is a popular bird breeding site because of the mixing of fresh and salt water in the Senegal River delta.

Some of the region's worst malaria is found in this area, due to the construction of a dam built in the area. Bilharzia and invasive plant species have also taken hold.

=== Environment ===
During the rainy season, much of the park consists of large lakes. It is known for having over 220 species of identified birds, as well as many species of fish.

==== Birds ====
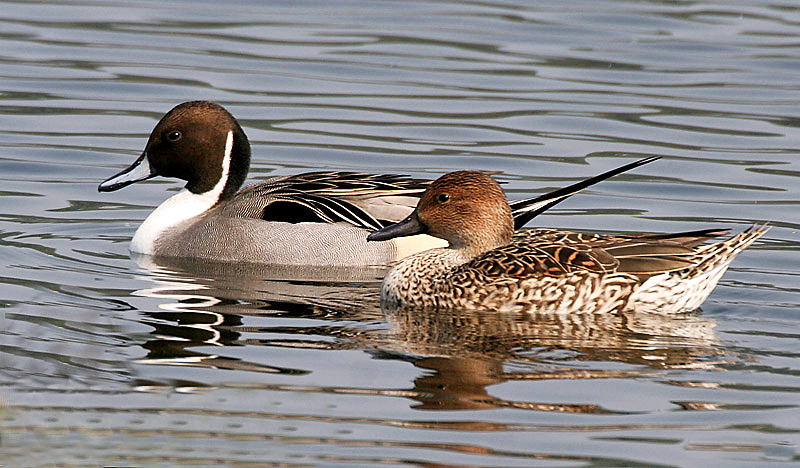
A pair of northern pintails

Diawling National Park is home to a remarkable variety of birds. The species found here include northern pintail, northern shoveler, greater flamingo, lesser flamingo, Eurasian spoonbill, African spoonbill, great egret, great white pelican, Arabian bustard, pied avocet, slender-billed gull, Caspian tern, greater hoopoe-lark and Sudan golden sparrow. The site has also been designated an Important Bird Area (IBA) by BirdLife International because it supports significant wintering populations of waterbirds.

==== Mammals ====
Nature and man combined to obliterate some species in Diawling. Some of the larger mammals perished due to prolonged drought and excessive hunting. The last remaining West African lion in Diawling was shot in 1970, and the last sighting of the red-fronted gazelle was in 1991. Today, the only mammals in the park are spotted hyenas, African wolves, warthogs, African wildcats, Cape hares and patas monkeys. Other species, including the African manatee, West African crocodile, and hippopotamus, disappeared with the construction of the dam.

=== Climate change ===
In 2022, the IPCC Sixth Assessment Report included Diawling National Park in the list of African natural heritage sites which would be threatened by flooding and coastal erosion by the end of the 21st century, but only if climate change followed RCP 8.5, which is the scenario of high and continually increasing greenhouse gas emissions associated with the warming of over 4 °C., and is no longer considered very likely. The other, more plausible scenarios result in lower warming levels and consequently lower sea level rise: yet, sea levels would continue to increase for about 10,000 years under all of them. Even if the warming is limited to 1.5 °C, global sea level rise is still expected to exceed 2–3 m (7–10 ft) after 2000 years (and higher warming levels will see larger increases by then), consequently exceeding 2100 levels of sea level rise under RCP 8.5 (~0.75 m (2 ft) with a range of 0.5–1 m (2–3 ft)) well before the year 4000.

== See also ==
- Wildlife of Mauritania
