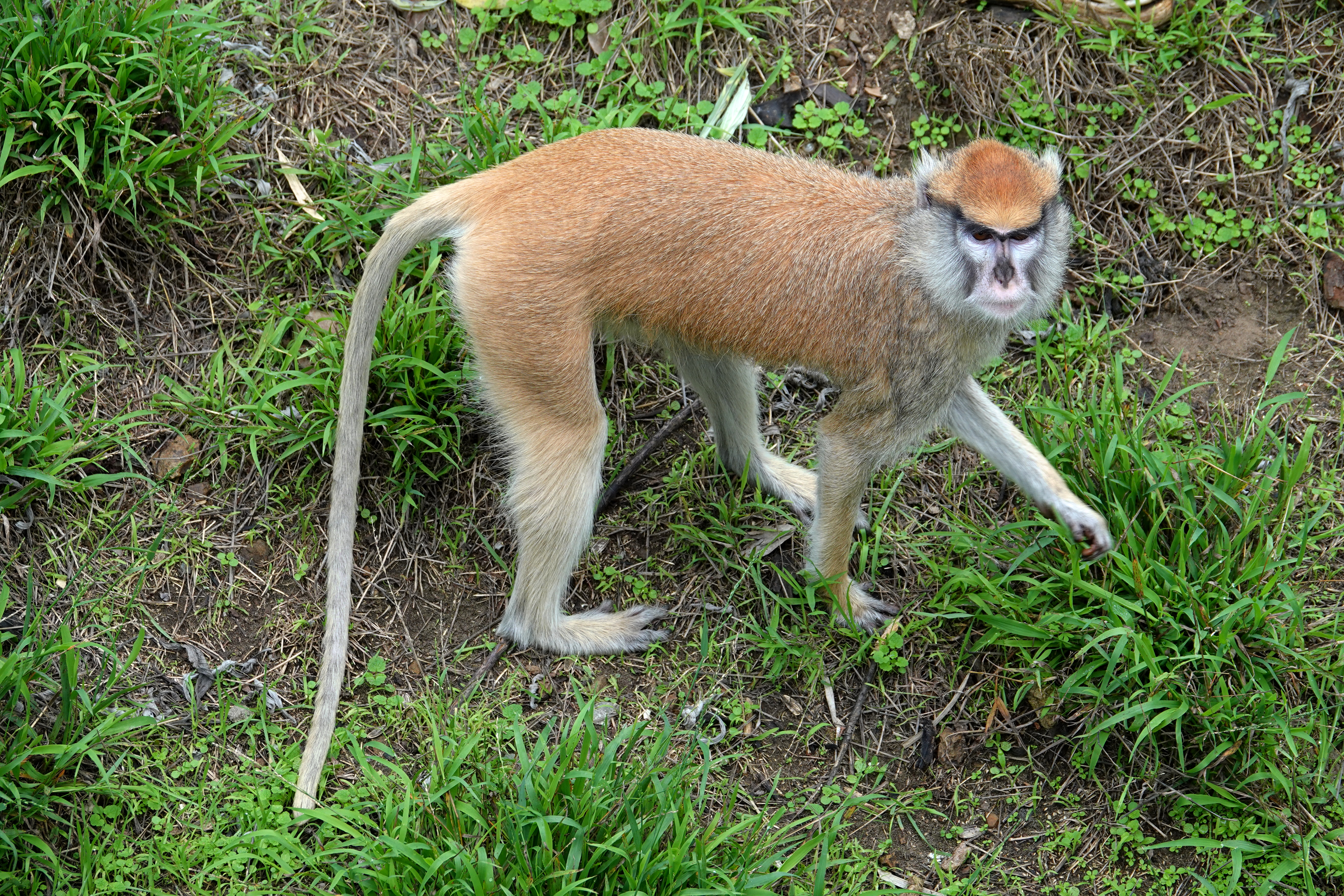
- At the San Francisco Zoo, California, U.S.

Conservation status
- Near Threatened (IUCN 3.1)

Scientific classification
- Kingdom: Animalia
- Phylum: Chordata
- Class: Mammalia
- Order: Primates
- Family: Cercopithecidae
- Genus: Erythrocebus
- Species: E. patas

Binomial name
- Erythrocebus patas (Schreber, 1775)
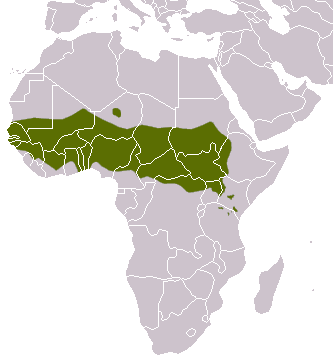
- Geographic range (includes E. poliophaeus and E. baumstarki)

= Common patas monkey =

Species of Old World monkey

The common patas monkey (Erythrocebus patas), also known as the hussar monkey, is a ground-dwelling monkey distributed over semi-arid areas of West Africa, and into East Africa.

== Taxonomy ==
There is some confusion surrounding if there are valid subspecies, with some listing four, others three, and others listing two: the western Erythrocebus patas patas (with a black nose) and the eastern E. patas pyrrhonotus (with a white nose). However, it was later discovered that the nose colour used to separate these subspecies could change to white during pregnancy in females, as well as in general as animals aged, and E. patas pyrrhonotus in Kenya often did not have white noses, thus Mammal Species of the World has classified E. patas as a monotypic species.

The genus status of the species has previously been in flux. Colin Groves first argued the species was closely related to Cercopithecus aethiops in 1989, based on anatomical morphology. Phylogenetic evidence from 2003 appeared to validate him, finding the patas monkey to form a clade within the vervet genus Cercopithecus together with C. aethiops and C. lhoesti, and based on this study Erythrocebus was proposed to be sunk into synonymy with Cercopithecus. However, more recent studies have found this interpretation of Cercopithecus to be paraphyletic, and thus many species in Cercopithecus have since been reclassified to numerous new genera and species, with C. aethiops moved to Chlorocebus and C. lhoesti to Allochrocebus. Erythrocebus is thus now thought to be a distinct genus.

Erythrocebus was previously thought to be a monotypic genus containing only E. patas. However, a 2017 study proposed splitting E. patas into three species (E. patas sensu stricto, E. poliphaeus, and E. baumstarki) based on morphological differences and heavy geographic separation between taxa, with the IUCN Red List and American Society of Mammalogists following through with this.

== Description ==
The male common patas monkey grows to 60 cm (24 in) to 87 cm (34 in) in length, excluding the tail, which measures 75 cm (30 in). Adult males are considerably larger than adult females, which average 49 cm (19 in) in length. Adult males average 12.4 kg (27.3 lb) and adult females 6.5 kg (14.3 lb), showing a high degree of sexual dimorphism. Males have the longest canine teeth of all the African long-tailed monkeys and the size of their canines plays a role in establishing a pecking order among males. Reaching speeds of 55 km/h (34 mph), it is the fastest runner among the primates. The life span in the wild can be up to about 20 years.

== Distribution and habitat ==
Patas monkeys live in dry, open woodland. They are found in many parts of central, western, and eastern Africa. They have also been introduced to Puerto Rico.

== Behavior ==
The common patas monkey lives in multi-female groups of up to 60 individuals (although much larger aggregations have been reported). The group contains just one adult male for most of the year. During the breeding season, outside males come into the group to mate with the females.

Among primates, patas monkeys have the longest daily travel distances and the largest home ranges for their body size. The adult females in the group initiate movement of the group with the male following their lead.

The common patas monkey feeds on insects, gum, seeds, and tubers, a diet more characteristic of much smaller primates.

=== Mating ===
Mating in common patas monkeys is seasonal and occurs for roughly one month each year. A female solicits mating by running past a male with her tail curled up and crouching in front of him. On some occasions, she'll also drool and puff out her cheeks.

=== Female social organization ===
Variation in the female social structure of patas monkeys has been observed across different populations. This variation may be dependent on food resources, as conflict between individuals is often a result of competition for limited resources. Higher rates of conflict over dense, but limited, food, such as fruit bushes, is associated with more stable, well defined dominance hierarchies than habitats with more diffuse resources, such as insects. Variation in the availability of these resources has been associated with variation in dominance hierarchies among females.

Conflict among females has also shown the presence of recognition among matrilineal relatives. It has been observed that, shortly after conflicts among two females, patas monkeys often act differently toward each other than if they had not been in conflict. Females often reconcile with each other by activities such as sitting together and grooming. While this reconciliatory behavior is observed even between unrelated individuals, it is most common among matrilineal relatives. Dominance structure has relatively little effect on the probability of reconciliation occurring, except that the alpha-female is the least reconciliatory of the females. Affiliation toward matrilineal relatives is common in other primates as well, such as vervet monkeys.

Cooperation among females has also been observed. Adult females without children may help rear others' infants. In a captive group, a female would regularly take and suckle an infant younger than her own.

=== Male social organization ===
Outside of mating season (which is roughly one month a year), relatively stable groups with one adult male and several females are the norm. This leaves an excess of males that either form all-male groups or live on their own. During the mating season, when females become receptive, outside males come into the group to mate with females "in apparently total promiscuity." With the rush of outside males, the resident male has no marked mating advantage over the others. At the end of the mating season, when most of the females are pregnant, one-male groupings are reformed as a single male will chase the others away. In some instances, submissive males are tolerated by the resident male for short periods of time; however, they rarely remain in the group for more than a few days.

Young males have been observed to leave their natal groups anywhere from two to four years of age, with variation between groups. The reason young males leave their natal group remains undetermined. While adult males have been observed to act aggressively toward young males in captivity, wild patas monkeys leave their group without any aggression from the adult male. The juveniles spend less and less time with the adult females in the group but not the adult male. This may indicate weakening of matrilineal ties rather than male aggression as the main reason juveniles disperse from their natal group.

=== Alarm calls ===
Common patas monkeys have several distinct alarm calls that warn members in the group of predators. Different alarm calls are given by different group members (i.e. adult females, adult males, juveniles, etc.) and certain alarm calls are distinctive of different types of predators. Unlike other primates, patas monkeys rarely take refuge from predators in trees. This is most likely due to the relatively sparse tree cover in patas monkey habitats. While patas monkeys usually run on the ground away from predators, individuals have been observed to attack predators such as jackals and wildcats. This behavior has been observed in both males and females.

== In popular culture ==
The relationship between the patas monkey and the whistling thorn acacia may have inspired The Lorax by Dr. Seuss.

== Gallery ==
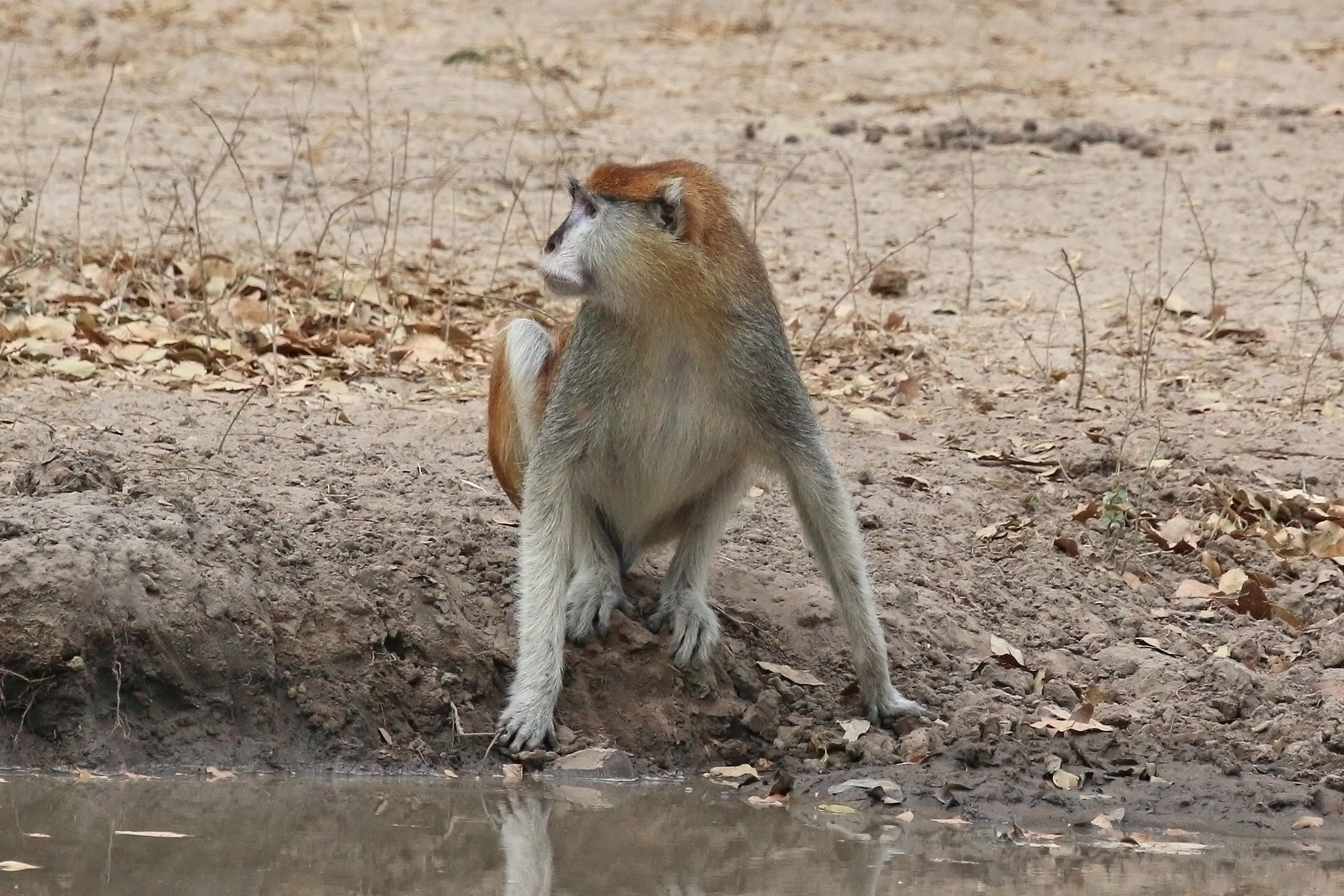
male, Senegal

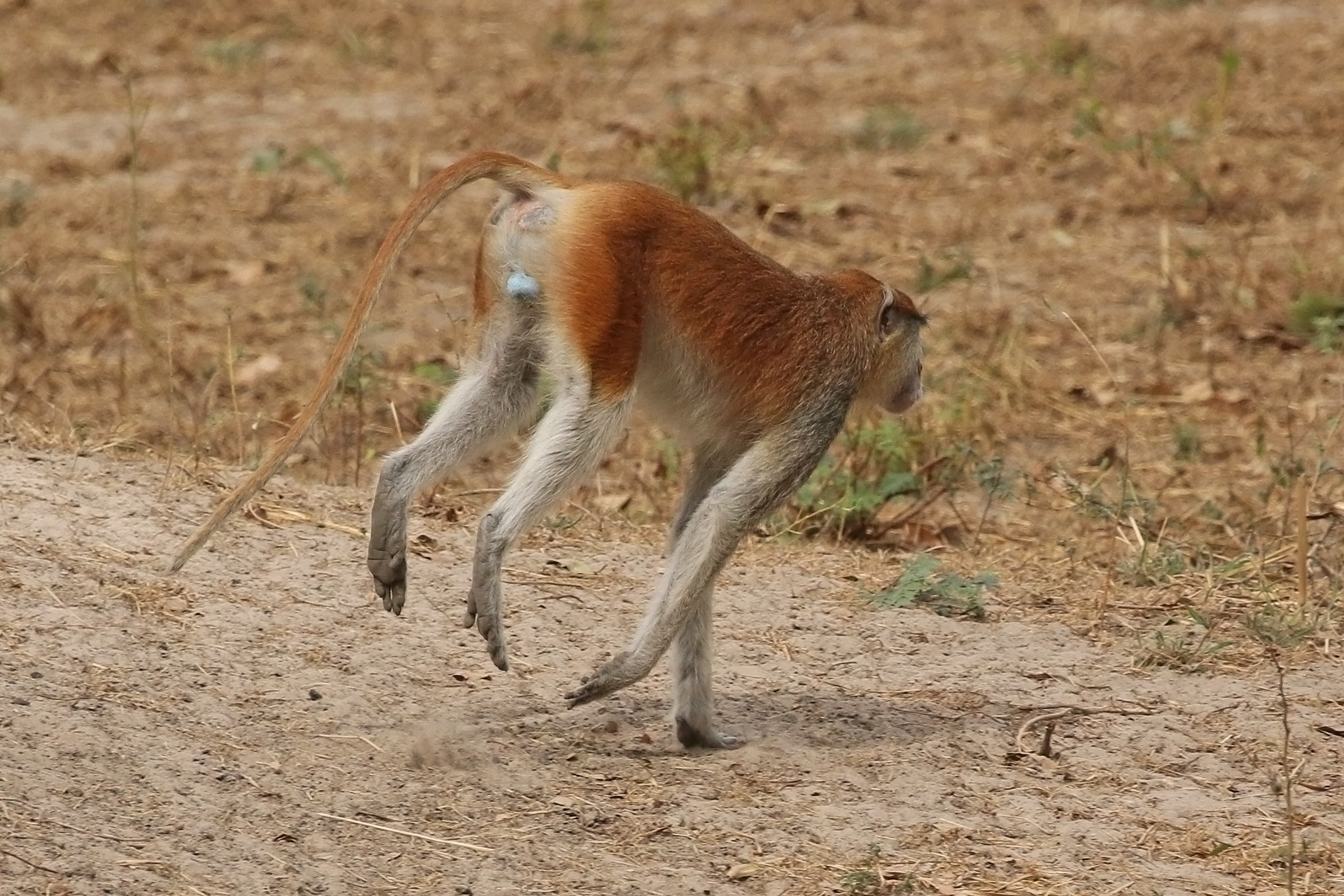
male, showing blue scrotum, Senegal

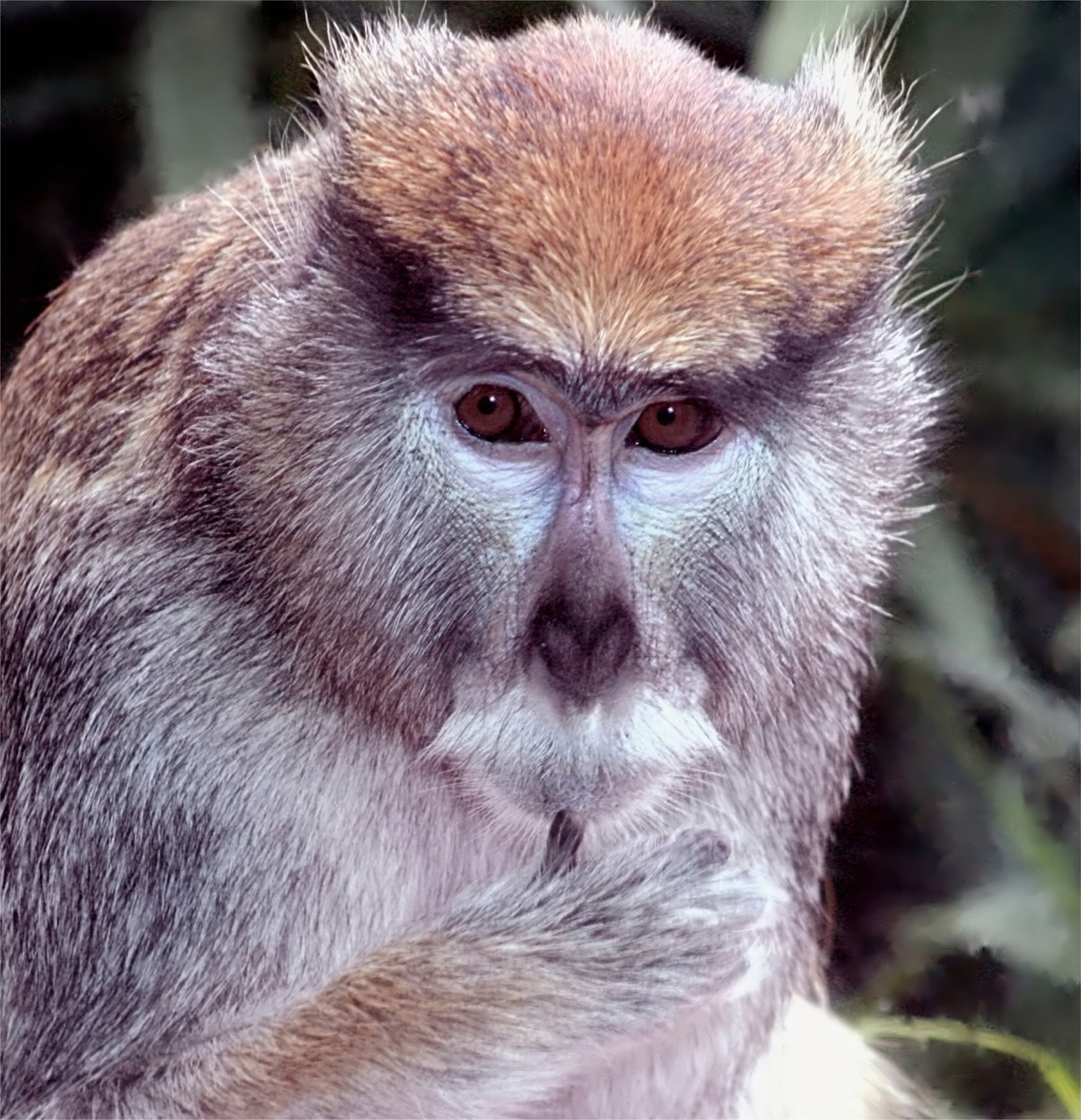

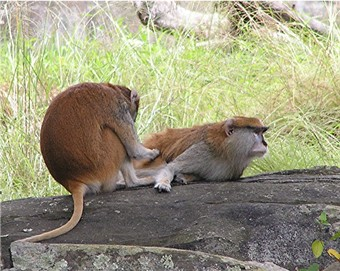

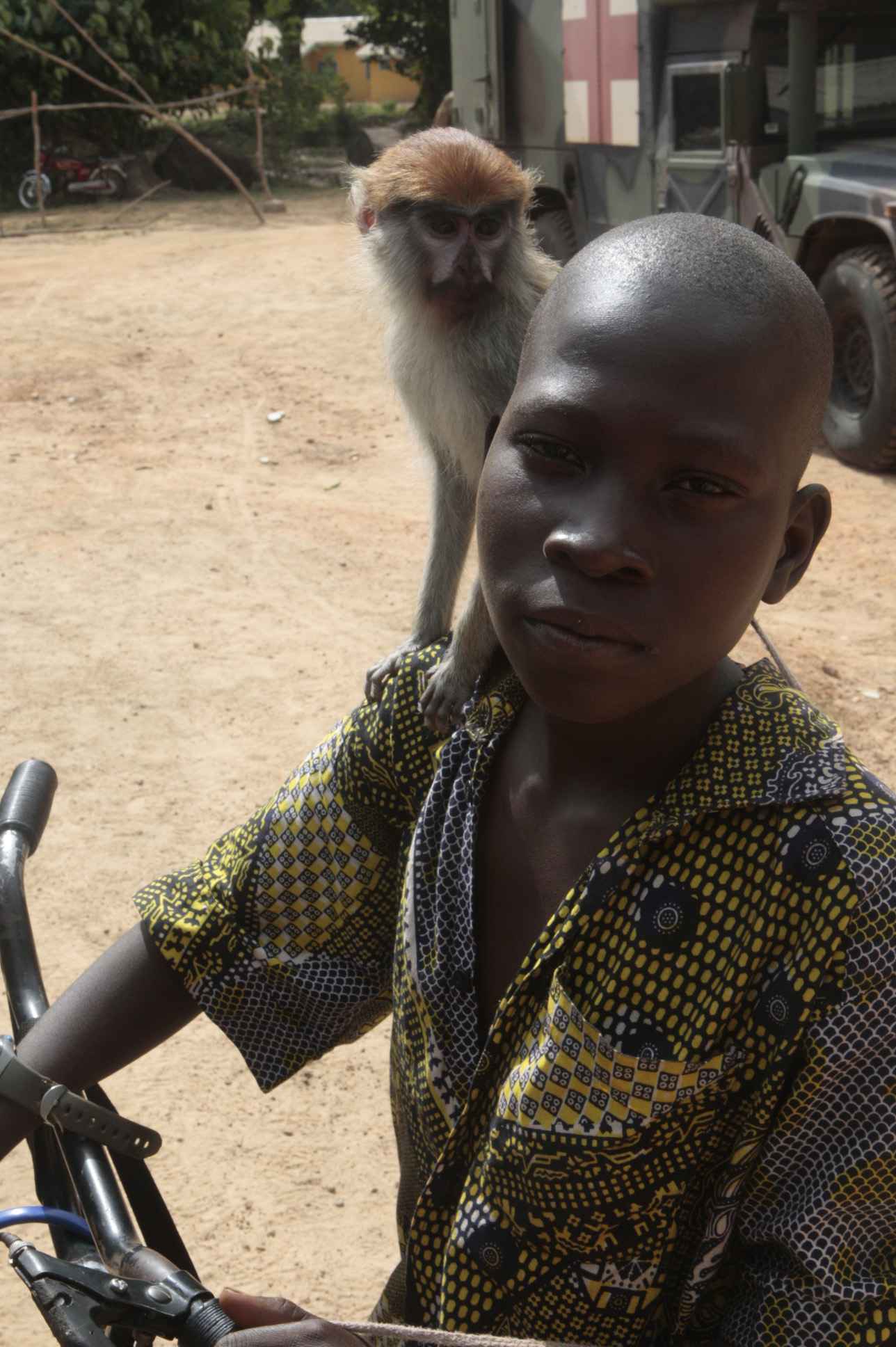
Beninese boy with pet monkey
