= Trarza region =

Region of Mauritania

Trarza ولاية الترارزة
- Region of Mauritania
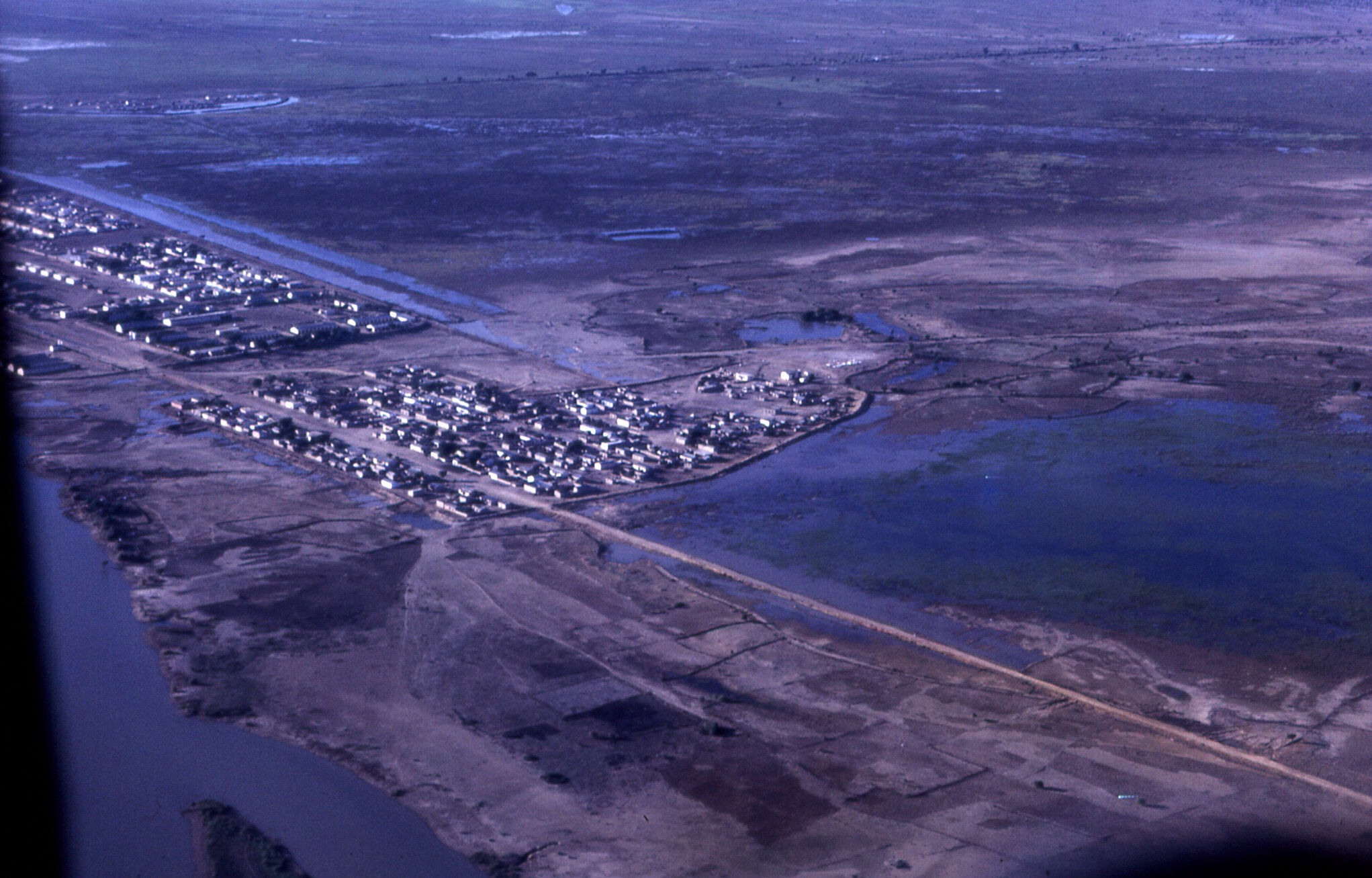
- Rosso Town

- Map of Mauritania showing Trarza Region
- Coordinates: 17°59′N 14°44′W
- Country: Mauritania
- Departments: Boutilimit, Keur Massene, Mederdra, Ouad Naga, R'Kiz, Rosso
- Capital: Rosso

Area
  - Total: 67,800 km^{2} (26,200 sq mi)

Population (2023 census)
  - Total: 323,903
  - Density: 4.78/km^{2} (12.4/sq mi)
- Time zone: UTC+0
  - Summer (DST): not observed
- HDI (2017): 0.582 medium

Trarza (Arabic: ولاية الترارزة, romanized: Wilāyat al-Tarārizah) is a region in southwest Mauritania. Its capital is Rosso. Other major cities and towns include Mederdra and Boutilimit. Trarza borders the regions of Inchiri and Adrar to the north, Brakna to the east, and the country of Senegal to the south. Its western coastline on the Atlantic Ocean is interrupted only by the Mauritanian capital Nouakchott, which the region completely surrounds.

In 2013, the population of the region was 272,773, compared to 345,076 in 2011. There were 47.79 per cent females and 52.21 per cent males.

In 2008, the activity rate was 42.60, and the economic dependency ratio was 0.99. The literacy rate for people aged 15 years and over was 79.0 per cent.

== Demographics ==
In 2013, the population of the region was 272,773. There were 47.79 per cent females and 52.21 per cent males.

In 2008, the Couples with children was 35.10 and Couples without children was 3.70. The proportion with extended family was 18.30 per cent extended single-parent was 8.40 per cent, one-person was 3.90 per cent, and single-parent nuclear was 30.60 per cent. The rate of households confirming the existence of public telephone in their neighbourhood or village was 94.21, the rate of households benefiting from electricity posts in their neighbourhood was 2.74 per cent, the rate of households benefiting from the health center or health post in their neighbourhood was 8.11 per cent, and the rate of households benefiting from sanitary services was 4.78 per cent.

== Economy ==
In 2008, the activity rate was 42.60 and economic dependency ratio was 0.99. The fraction of people working in government was 10.70 per cent, individual/household private was 20.80 per cent, other was 53.50 per cent, para-public was 0.70 per cent, and private enterprise was 14.40 per cent. The grand total was 690.09.

In 2013, the coverage rate of DPT3 Children From 0 to 11 months in the region was 59.80 per cent, BGC vaccination was 60.90 and polio vaccination coverage was 59.40. In 2007, the number of tourist establishments in the region was 12.

In 2008, the literacy rate for people aged 15 years and over was 79.00. The net enrolment ratio of girls for secondary level was 9.80 per cent and boys 13.60 per cent. Total net enrolment ratio at secondary level was 11.50 per cent.

== Geography ==
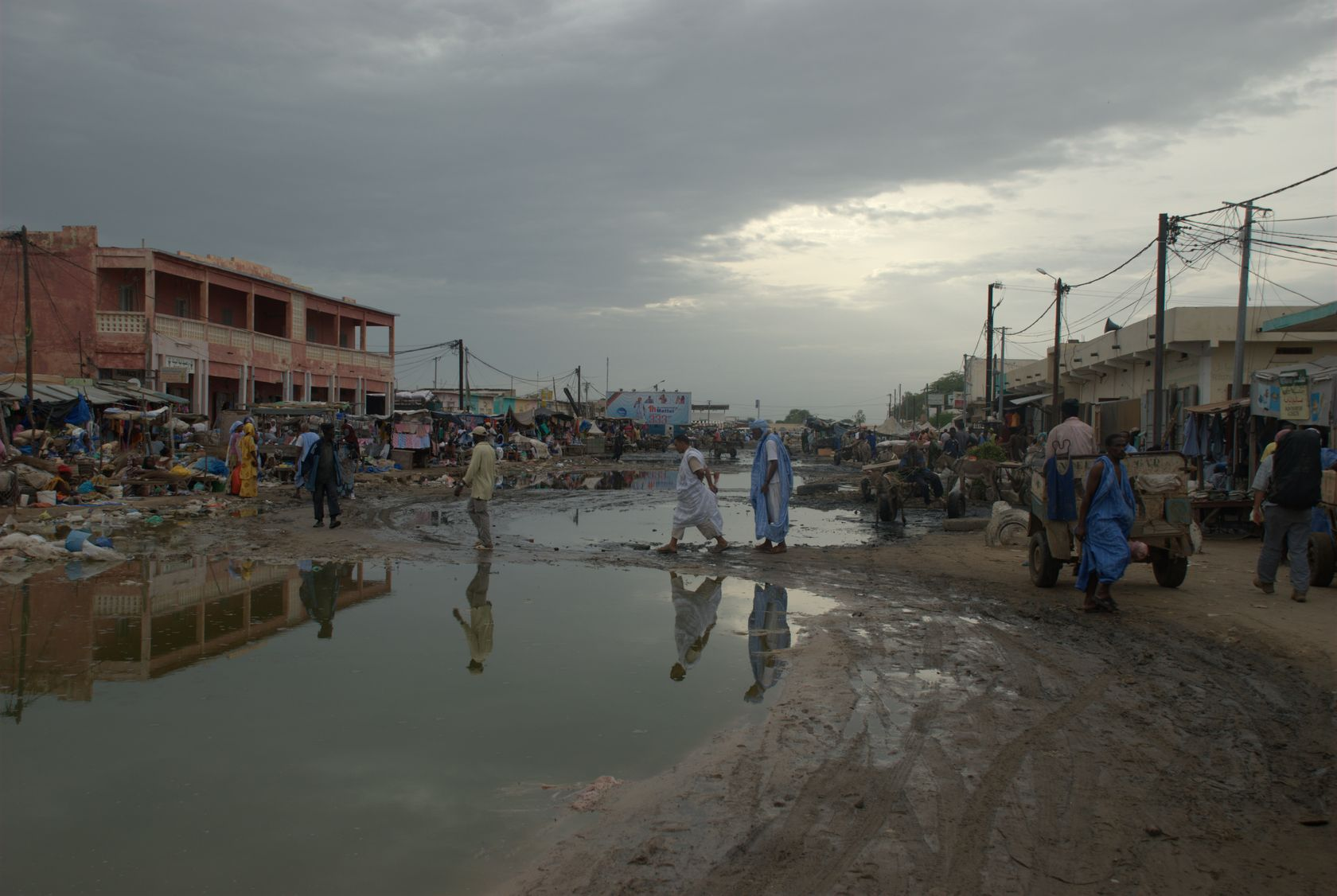
Floods in Rosso (2010)

Trarza borders the regions of Inchiri and Adrar to the north, Brakna to the east, and the country of Senegal to the south. Its western coastline on the Atlantic Ocean is interrupted only by the Mauritanian capital Nouakchott, which the region completely surrounds. Mauritania is mostly covered with desert, with only its western regions around the coast of the Atlantic Ocean having some vegetation. There are some oases in the desert regions. Since it is a desert, there are large shifting dunes forming temporary ranges. The average elevation is around 460 m (1,510 ft) above the mean sea level. The rainfall in the northern regions closer to the Tropic of Cancer receives around 100 mm (3.9 in) of annual rainfall compared to the southern portions that receives around 660 mm (26 in). The average temperature is 37.8 °C (100.0 °F), while during the night it reaches 0 °C (32 °F).

Due to the geography, the inhabitants historically, have been nomadic. In modern times, people have migrated to urban centres during the drought in the 1970s and the early 1980s. There are a few sedentary cultivators, who are located only in the southern regions of the country. Research has indicated that the Saharan movement has resulted in reduction of rains in the region from the 1960s, when it received close to 250 mm (9.8 in) of rainfall.

== Administration ==
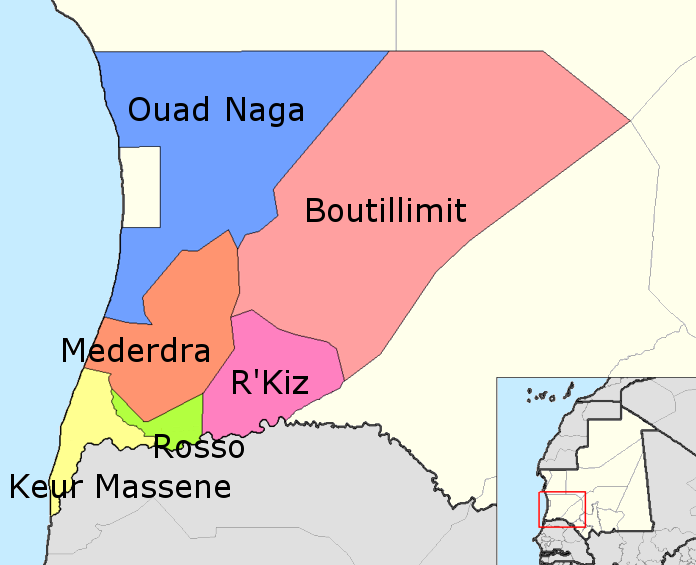
Departments of Trarza.

Trarza is divided into six departments, namely, Boutilimit, Keur Massene, Mederdra, Ouad Naga, R'Kiz and Rosso. The local administration is adopted from French local administration framework with a Ministry of Internal Control governing the local bodies. The original administration was held by governors of each district, but after the municipal elections in 1994, the powers has been decentralized from the district bodies. Mauritania has been divided into 13 wilayas (regions), including the Nouakchott Capital District. The smallest administrative division in the country is the commune and the country has 216 of them. A group of communes form a moughataa (department) and the group of moughataa form a district. There are total of 53 moughataa for the 13 districts in the country. The executive power of the district is vested on a district chief, while it is on hakem for moughataa. Out of the 216 communes, 53 classified as urban and rest 163 are rural. The communes are responsible for overseeing and coordinating development activities and are financed by the state.

The local governments have their own legal jurisdiction, financial autonomy, an annual budget, staff, and an office. The elections for the local government are conducted every five years along with regional and parliamentary elections. On account of the political instability, the last elections were held in 2023.

== See also ==
- Regions of Mauritania
- Departments of Mauritania
- Emirate of Trarza
