= List of companies of Mauritania =

Location of Mauritania.

Mauritania, officially the Islamic Republic of Mauritania, is a country in western North Africa. Despite being rich in natural resources, Mauritania has one of the lowest GDP rates in Africa. A majority of the population still depends on agriculture and livestock for a livelihood, even though most of the nomads and many subsistence farmers were forced into the cities by recurrent droughts in the 1970s and 1980s.

Mauritania has extensive deposits of iron ore, which account for almost 50% of total exports. With the current rises in metal prices, gold and copper mining companies are opening mines in the interior.

== Notable firms ==
This list includes notable companies with primary headquarters located in the country. The industry and sector follow the Industry Classification Benchmark taxonomy. Organizations which have ceased operations are included and noted as defunct.

Notable companies Status: P=Private, S=State; A=Active, D=Defunct
Name	Industry	Sector	Headquarters	Founded	Notes	Status	
Air Mauritanie	Consumer services	Airlines	Nouakchott	1962	Defunct, ceased all operations in 2007.	P	D
Central Bank of Mauritania	Financials	Banks	Nouakchott	1973	State Central Bank	S	A
Mauritania Airlines	Consumer services	Airlines	Nouakchott	2010	National Airline Company of Mauritania	P	A
Mauritania Airways	Consumer services	Airlines	Nouakchott	2006	Defunct, ceased all operations in 2010.	P	D
Mauritanian Post Company	Industrials	Delivery services	Nouakchott	1999	Postal service	P	A
Mauritel	Telecommunications	Mobile telecommunications	Nouakchott	1999	Part of Maroc Telecom (Morocco)	P	A

== See also ==
- Economy of Mauritania
- List of banks in Mauritania
- List of airlines of Mauritania
