= OUZ =

OUZ may refer to:

- Ohio University – Zanesville, a branch campus of Ohio University
- IATA Airport Code for Tazadit Airport in Mauritania
