= List of defunct airlines of Mauritania =

This is a list of defunct airlines of Mauritania.

Airline	Image	IATA	ICAO	Callsign	Commenced operations	Ceased operations	Notes
Air Ada			RDM	AIR ADA	Unknown.	Unknown.	
Air Afrique		RK	RKA	AIRAFRIQUE	1961	2002	Jointly owned by multiple West African countries.
Air Amder			RMD	AIR AMDER	2005	2007	
Air Fret De Mauritanie			FMT	AFDM	Unknown.	Unknown.	
Air Mauritanie		MR	MRT	MIKE ROMEO	1962	2007	Defunct, ceased all operations in 2007.
Air Soleil			SOE	AIR SOLEIL	Unknown.	Unknown.	
Al Rida Airways			LRW	AL RIDA	Unknown.	Unknown.	
Atlantic Airlines Cargo			MNV	AAC	1999	1999	
Benane Aviation Corporation			BNV	BENANE	Unknown.	Unknown.	
C.S.P.			RMU	AIR MAUR	Unknown.	Unknown.	
Caravan Air			VAN	CAMEL	Unknown.	Unknown.	
Cargo Express			MCX	MAURICARGO	Unknown.	Unknown.	
Chinguetti Airlines			CGU	CHINGUETTI	Unknown.	Unknown.	
Compagnie de Cargo International			CCX	CCI	1998	1998	
Compagnie Mauritanienne des Services			CMZ	CEE-EM-STAIRS	Unknown.	Unknown.	
Compagnie Mauritanienne de Transports			CPM	CMT	1998	2005	
Compagnie Mauritanienne de Transports Aérien				CMTAN	2001	2006	
Dunair			DUN	DUNAIR	Unknown.	Unknown.	
Lignes Mauritaniennes Air Express			LME	LIMAIR EXPRESS	Unknown.	Unknown.	
Mauria			MIA	MAURIA	1996	1998	
Mauritania Airlines International (MAI)		L6	MTW	MAI	2010	2018	Renamed to Mauritania Airlines.
Mauritania Airways		YD	MTW	MAURITANIA AIRWAYS	2006	2010	Defunct, ceased all operations in 2010.
Maurtanienne Aerienne et Navale			MNV	NAVALE	Unknown.	Unknown.	
Mauritanienne Air Fret			MRF	MAUR-FRET	Unknown.	Unknown.	
Mauritanienne Airways			MWY	MAURITANIENNE	2006	2006	
Mauritanienne de Transport Aérien			MDE	MAURI-TRANS	1996	1998	
Ocean Air			BCN	BLUE OCEAN	Unknown.	Unknown.	
Société De Transport Aerien de Mauritanie			NSC	TRANS-SOCIETE	Unknown.	Unknown.	
Société Tout Transport Mauritanien			TTM	TOUT-AIR	1998	2000	
Stella Aviation			SLV	AVISTELLA	Unknown.	Unknown.	
Tar Interpilot			TPL	INTERPILOT	Unknown.	Unknown.	
Trading Air Cargo			JCH	TRADING CARGO	Unknown.	Unknown.	
Trans Reco			REC	TRANS-RECO	Unknown.	Unknown.	
Transport Aérien de Mauritanie		TM	TRM	SOTRANSPOTM	Unknown.	Unknown.	
West African Cargo Airlines			WAC	WESTAF CARGO	Unknown.	Unknown.	
Zemmour Airlines			EMR	ZEMMOUR	Unknown.	Unknown.	.

== See also ==
- List of airlines of Mauritania
- List of airports in Mauritania
