= List of banks in Mauritania =

This is a list of commercial banks in Mauritania, as updated in late 2024 by the Central Bank of Mauritania.

== List of commercial banks ==
- International Bank of Mauritanie (IBM)
- Banque Mauritanienne de l’Investissement (BMI)
- Banque des Financements Islamiques (BFI)
- Qatar National Bank Mauritanie (QNBM), part of QNB Group
- Banque Islamique de Mauritanie (BIM)
- Nouvelle Banque de Mauritanie (NBM)
- Banque Muamelat As Sahiha (BMS)
- Banque Populaire de Mauritanie (BPM)
- Attijari Bank Mauritanie (ABM), part of Attijariwafa Bank Group
- Chinguitty Bank
- Société Générale Mauritanie (SGM), part of Société Générale Group
- Ora Bank Mauritanie, part of Orabank Group
- Banque El Amana (BEA)
- Banque Al Wava Mauritanienne Islamique (BAMIS)
- Générale de Banque de Mauritanie (GBM)
- Banque Nationale de Mauritanie (BNM)
- Banque Mauritanienne pour le Commerce International (BMCI)
- Banque pour le Commerce et l’Industrie (BCI), part of BCI Group

== See also ==
- Economy of Mauritania
- List of companies based in Mauritania
- List of banks in the Arab world
- List of banks in Africa
