= Nouakchott–Oumtounsy International Airport =

Nouakchott–Oumtounsy International Airport مطار نواكشوط الدولي - أم التونسي
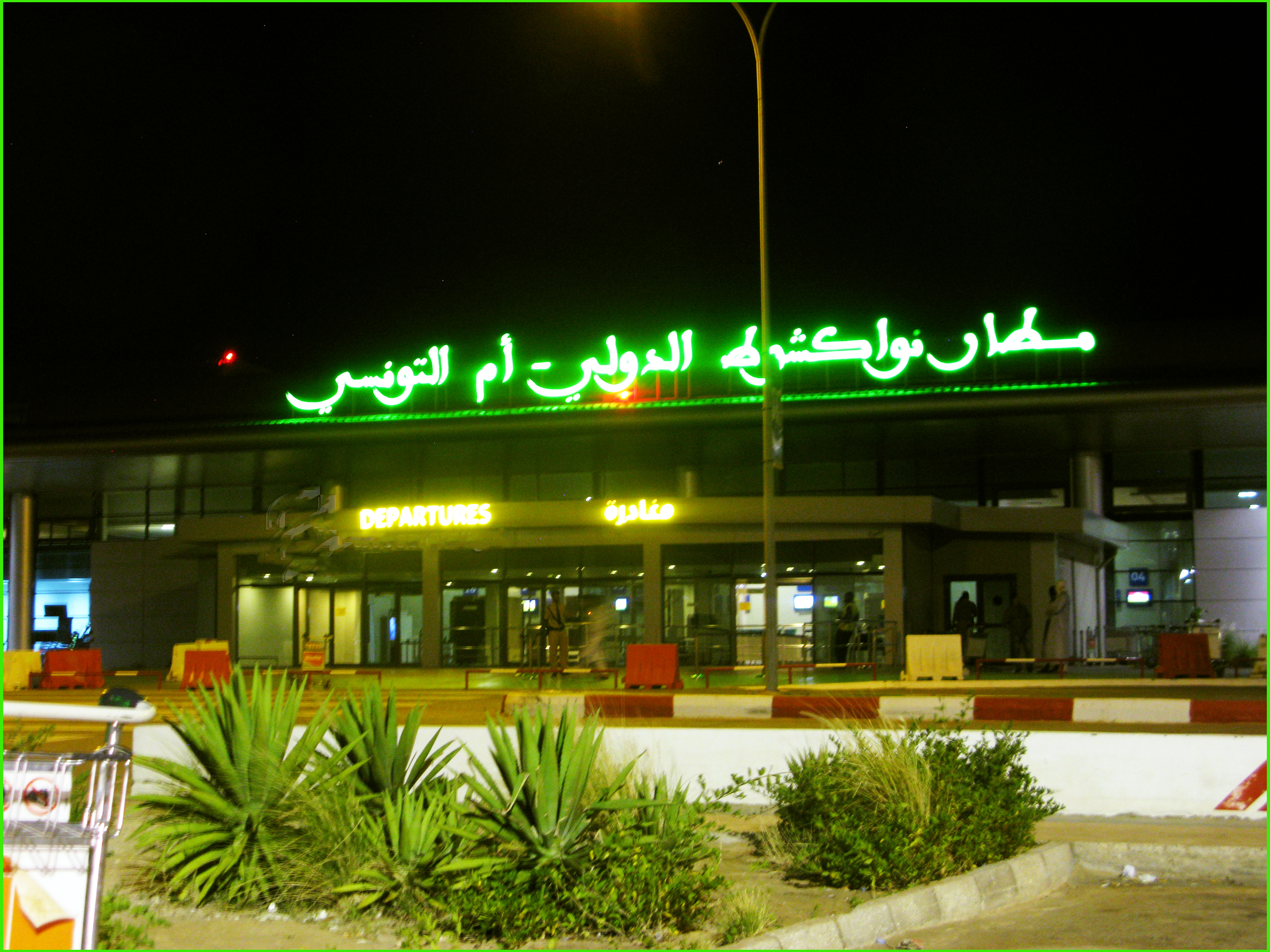
- IATA: NKC; ICAO: GQNO

Summary
- Airport type: Public
- Owner: Government of Mauritania
- Serves: Nouakchott
- Opened: 23 June 2016; 10 years ago
- Hub for: Mauritania Airlines
- Elevation AMSL: 3 m (9.8 ft)
- Coordinates: 18°18′36″N 015°58′11″W

Map
- Location in Mauritania Location in Africa

Runways
| Direction | Length | | Surface |
| Direction | m | ft | Surface |
|---|---|---|---|
| 06/24 | 2,400 | 7,874 | Concrete |
| 16/34 | 3,400 | 11,155 | Concrete |
- Source: AIP from ASECNA

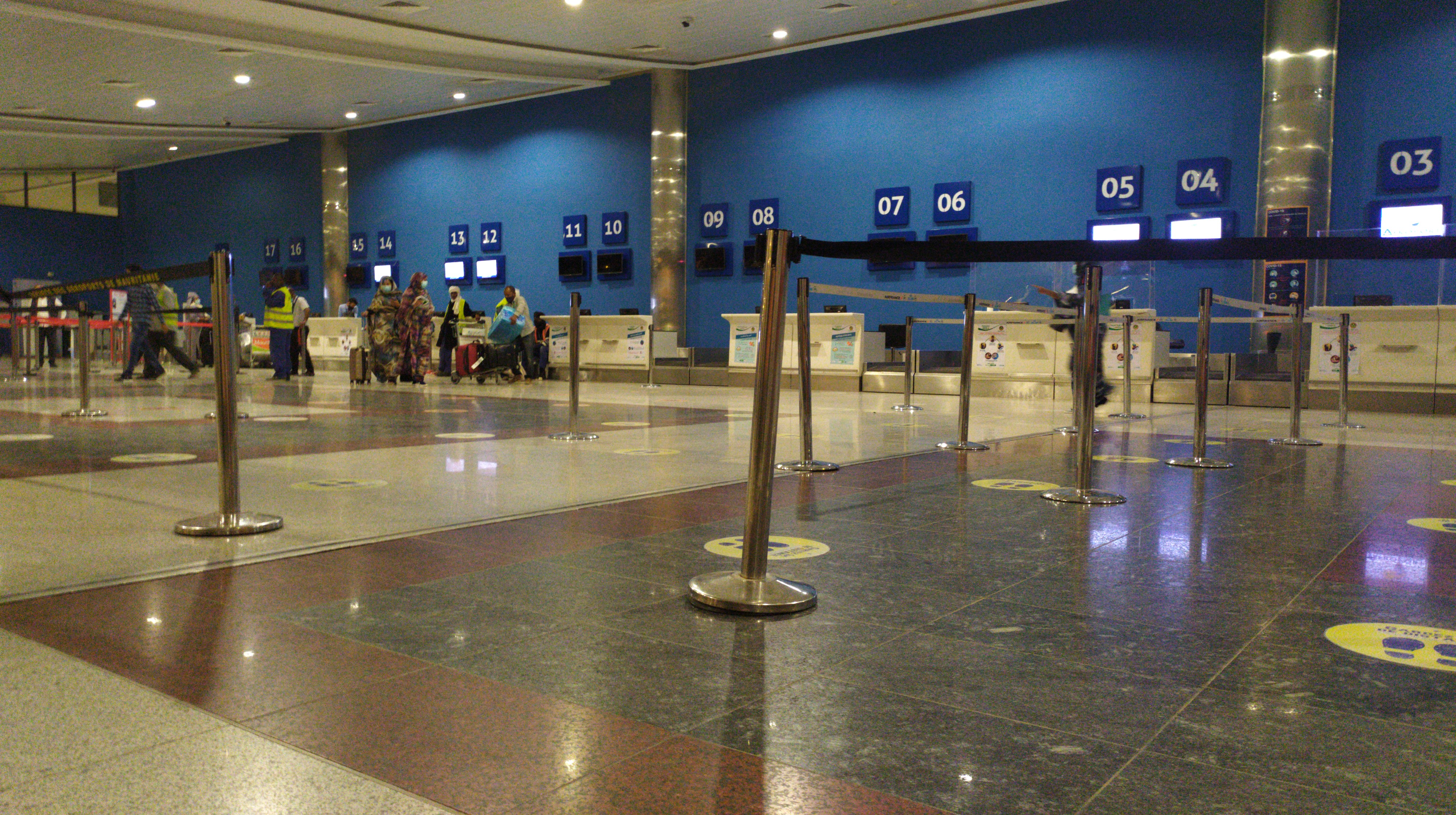
Inside of the airport

Nouakchott–Oumtounsy International Airport (IATA: NKC, ICAO: GQNO) (Arabic: مطار نواكشوط الدولي - أم التونسي, French: Aéroport International de Nouakchott–Oumtounsy) is an international airport serving Nouakchott, the capital of Mauritania. It is located 25 kilometres (16 mi) north of the city. The airport opened in June 2016 as the replacement for Nouakchott International Airport.

== History ==
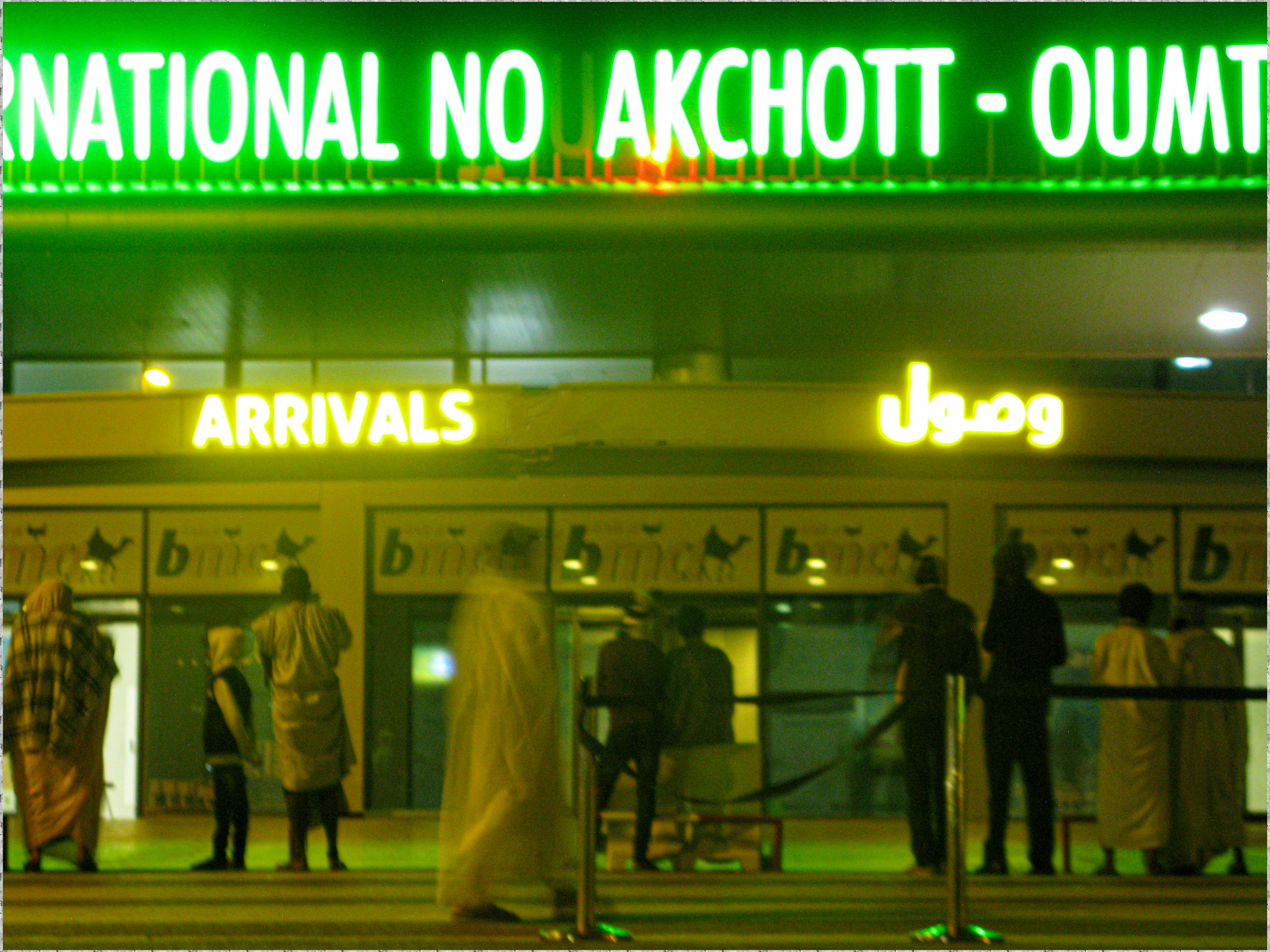
Exterior of the airport

Designed by Omer Houessou, the airport is the largest project in Mauritania since 1960. The Government of Mauritania approved the plan on 13 October 2011, and local company Najah for Major Works (NMW) started construction the following month.

Oumtounsy Airport opened on 23 June 2016, in time for the 27th Arab League summit in late July. It replaced Nouakchott International Airport, which is located 25 kilometres (16 mi) to the south in the city centre. A Mauritania Airlines International flight from Zouérat arrived at 12:00, becoming the first to land at the airport. President Mohamed Ould Abdel Aziz arrived in the afternoon to inaugurate the airport amid the landing of the first international flight, that of Turkish Airlines from Istanbul–Atatürk.

== Infrastructure ==
The 30,000-square-metre (320,000 sq ft) passenger terminal has 6 jet bridges and can handle 2 million passengers per year. There is also a dedicated terminal for air cargo and a VIP reception area.

=== Runways ===
The airport has two runways:

- Runway 06/24: 2,400 by 45 metres (7,874 ft × 148 ft)
- Runway 16/34: 3,400 by 60 metres (11,150 ft × 200 ft)

== Airlines and destinations ==
The following airlines operate regular scheduled and charter flights at Nouakchott–Oumtounsy Airport:

| Airlines | Destinations |
|---|---|
| Air Algérie | Algiers, Dakar–Diass |
| Air France | Conakry, Paris–Charles de Gaulle |
| Air Senegal | Dakar–Diass |
| ASKY Airlines | Conakry, Lomé |
| Binter Canarias | Gran Canaria |
| Mauritania Airlines | Bamako, Casablanca, Conakry, Dakar–Diass, Gran Canaria, Néma, Nouadhibou, Tunis |
| Royal Air Maroc | Casablanca |
| Tunisair | Tunis |
| Turkish Airlines | Banjul, Istanbul |

== Access ==
Nouakchott–Oumtounsy International Airport is connected to the city of Nouakchott by Sheikh Zayed Road.

== See also ==
- List of airports in Mauritania
