= List of Iberia destinations =

As of May 2021, Iberia flies to 26 domestic and 64 international destinations across Africa, the Americas, Asia and Europe. This list does not include irregular charters and destinations served by Air Nostrum operating as Iberia Regional or Iberia Express.

== List ==
Country	City	Airport	Notes	Refs
Albania	Tirana	Tirana International Airport Nënë Tereza	Seasonal	
Algeria	Algiers	Houari Boumediene Airport		
Algeria	Oran	Oran Es Sénia Airport		
Angola	Luanda	Quatro de Fevereiro Airport	Terminated	
Argentina	Buenos Aires	Ministro Pistarini International Airport		
Argentina	Córdoba	Ingeniero Aeronáutico Ambrosio L.V. Taravella International Airport		
Austria	Innsbruck	Innsbruck Airport		
Austria	Salzburg	Salzburg Airport		
Austria	Vienna	Vienna International Airport		
Belgium	Brussels	Brussels Airport		
Brazil	Fortaleza	Pinto Martins – Fortaleza International Airport		
Brazil	Recife	Recife/Guararapes–Gilberto Freyre International Airport		
Brazil	Rio de Janeiro	Rio de Janeiro/Galeão International Airport		
Brazil	São Paulo	São Paulo/Guarulhos International Airport		
Canada	Montreal	Montréal–Trudeau International Airport	Terminated	
Canada	Toronto	Toronto Pearson International Airport		
Chile	Santiago	Arturo Merino Benítez International Airport		
China	Shanghai	Shanghai Pudong International Airport	Terminated	
Colombia	Bogotá	El Dorado International Airport		
Colombia	Cali	Alfonso Bonilla Aragón International Airport	Terminated	
Colombia	Medellín	José María Córdova International Airport		
Costa Rica	San José	Juan Santamaría International Airport		
Croatia	Dubrovnik	Dubrovnik Airport		
Croatia	Split	Split Airport	Seasonal	
Croatia	Zagreb	Zagreb Airport		
Cuba	Havana	José Martí International Airport	Suspended	
Czech Republic	Prague	Václav Havel Airport Prague		
Dominican Republic	Santo Domingo	Las Américas International Airport		
Ecuador	Guayaquil	José Joaquín de Olmedo International Airport		
Ecuador	Quito	Mariscal Sucre International Airport		
Egypt	Cairo	Cairo International Airport		
El Salvador	San Salvador	El Salvador International Airport		
Equatorial Guinea	Malabo	Malabo International Airport	Terminated	
Finland	Rovaniemi	Rovaniemi Airport	Seasonal	
France	Marseille	Marseille Provence Airport		
France	Paris	Charles de Gaulle Airport		
France	Paris	Orly Airport		
Germany	Düsseldorf	Düsseldorf Airport		
Germany	Frankfurt	Frankfurt Airport		
Germany	Hamburg	Hamburg Airport		
Germany	Munich	Munich Airport		
Ghana	Accra	Accra International Airport	Terminated	
Gibraltar	Gibraltar	Gibraltar International Airport	Terminated	
Greece	Athens	Athens International Airport		
Guatemala	Guatemala City	La Aurora International Airport		
Hungary	Budapest	Budapest Ferenc Liszt International Airport		
Iran	Tehran	Mehrabad International Airport	Terminated	
Israel	Tel Aviv	Ben Gurion Airport		
Italy	Bologna	Bologna Guglielmo Marconi Airport		
Italy	Cagliari	Cagliari Elmas Airport	Seasonal	
Italy	Catania	Catania–Fontanarossa Airport	Seasonal	
Italy	Florence	Florence Airport		
Italy	Genoa	Genoa Cristoforo Colombo Airport	Seasonal	
Italy	Milan	Milan Linate Airport		
Italy	Milan	Milan Malpensa Airport		
Italy	Olbia	Olbia Costa Smeralda Airport	Seasonal	
Italy	Palermo	Falcone Borsellino Airport	Seasonal	
Italy	Rome	Rome Fiumicino Airport		
Italy	Venice	Venice Marco Polo Airport		
Japan	Tokyo	Narita International Airport		
Kuwait	Kuwait City	Kuwait International Airport	Terminated	
Libya	Tripoli	Tripoli International Airport	Terminated	
Libya	Benghazi	Benina International Airport	Terminated	
Luxembourg	Luxembourg	Luxembourg Airport	Terminated	
Maldives	Malé	Velana International Airport	Terminated	
Mauritania	Nouakchott	Nouakchott International Airport	Terminated	
Mexico	Mexico City	Mexico City International Airport		
Morocco	Casablanca	Mohammed V International Airport		
Morocco	Fez	Fès–Saïs Airport		
Morocco	Marrakesh	Marrakesh Menara Airport		
Morocco	Rabat	Rabat–Salé Airport	Terminated	
Morocco	Tangier	Tangier Ibn Battouta Airport		
Nicaragua	Managua	Augusto C. Sandino International Airport		
Nigeria	Lagos	Murtala Muhammed International Airport	Terminated	
Norway	Bergen	Bergen Airport, Flesland	Seasonal	
Norway	Oslo	Oslo Airport, Gardermoen		
Norway	Tromsø	Tromsø Airport	Seasonal	
Panama	Panama City	Tocumen International Airport		
Paraguay	Asunción	Silvio Pettirossi International Airport		
Peru	Lima	Jorge Chávez International Airport		
Portugal	Funchal	Cristiano Ronaldo International Airport	Seasonal	
Portugal	Lisbon	Humberto Delgado Airport		
Portugal	Porto	Francisco Sá Carneiro Airport		
Qatar	Doha	Hamad International Airport		
Romania	Bucharest	Bucharest Henri Coandă International Airport	Seasonal	
Russia	Moscow	Moscow Domodedovo Airport	Terminated	
Russia	Saint Petersburg	Pulkovo Airport	Terminated	
Saudi Arabia	Jeddah	King Abdulaziz International Airport	Terminated	
Slovenia	Ljubljana	Ljubljana Jože Pučnik Airport		
Senegal	Dakar	Blaise Diagne International Airport		
South Africa	Johannesburg	O. R. Tambo International Airport	Terminated	
Spain	A Coruña	A Coruña Airport		
Spain	Asturias	Asturias Airport		
Spain	Barcelona	Josep Tarradellas Barcelona–El Prat Airport	Focus city	
Spain	Bilbao	Bilbao Airport		
Spain	Granada	Federico García Lorca Airport		
Spain	Jerez de la Frontera	Jerez Airport		
Spain	Las Palmas	Gran Canaria Airport		
Spain	Madrid	Madrid–Barajas Airport	Hub	
Spain	Murcia	Murcia–San Javier Airport	Airport closed	
Spain	Palma de Mallorca	Palma de Mallorca Airport	Terminated	
Spain	San Sebastián	San Sebastián Airport		
Spain	Santander	Santander Airport		
Spain	Santiago de Compostela	Santiago–Rosalía de Castro Airport	Terminated	
Spain	Vigo	Vigo Airport		
Sweden	Stockholm	Stockholm Arlanda Airport		
Switzerland	Geneva	Geneva Airport		
Switzerland	Zurich	Zurich Airport		
Tunisia	Tunis	Tunis–Carthage International Airport	Terminated	
Turkey	Istanbul	Istanbul Airport		
Thailand	Bangkok	Suvarnabhumi Airport		
United Kingdom	London	Heathrow Airport		
United States	Anchorage	Ted Stevens Anchorage International Airport	Terminated	
United States	Boston	Logan International Airport		
United States	Chicago	O'Hare International Airport		
United States	Dallas	Dallas Fort Worth International Airport		
United States	Los Angeles	Los Angeles International Airport		
United States	Miami	Miami International Airport		
United States	New York City	John F. Kennedy International Airport		
United States	Orlando	Orlando International Airport		
United States	San Francisco	San Francisco International Airport	Seasonal	
United States	San Juan	Luis Muñoz Marín International Airport		
United States	Washington, D.C.	Dulles International Airport	Seasonal	
Uruguay	Montevideo	Carrasco International Airport		
Venezuela	Caracas	Simon Bolivar International Airport		
