= List of airlines of Mauritania =

This is a list of airlines currently operating in Mauritania:

Airline	Image	IATA	ICAO	Callsign	Commenced operations	Notes
Mauritania Airlines		L6	MAI	MAURITANIA AIRLINES	2010	

== See also ==
- List of defunct airlines of Mauritania
- List of airports in Mauritania
- List of companies based in Mauritania
