= Ahmed Sékou Touré International Airport =

International airport serving Conakry, Guinea

Ahmed Sékou Touré International Airport Aéroport international Ahmed Sékou Touré
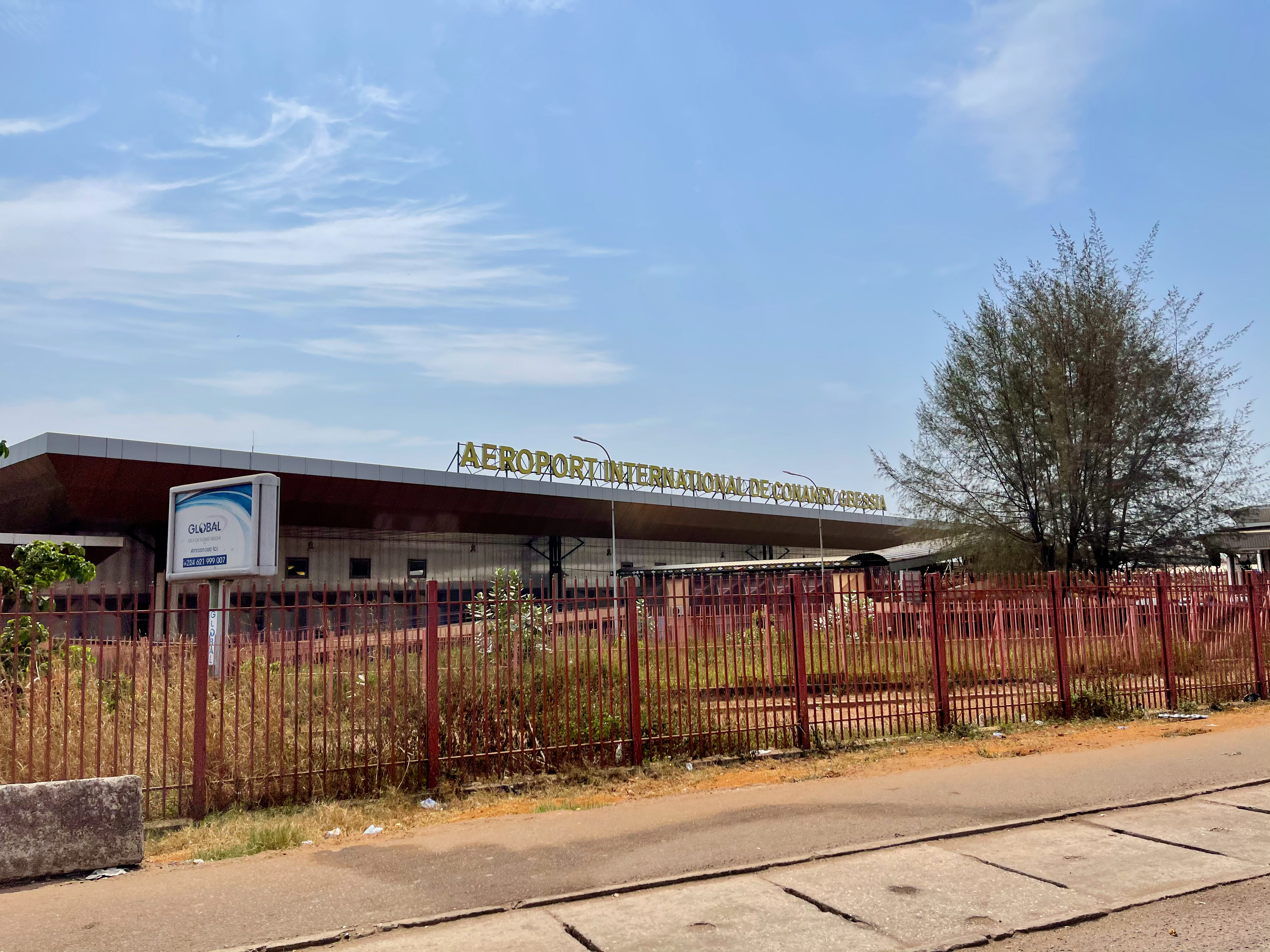
- IATA: CKY; ICAO: GUCY

Summary
- Airport type: Public
- Operator: SOGEAC
- Serves: Conakry, Guinea
- Opened: 1945
- Elevation AMSL: 72 ft (22 m)
- Coordinates: 09°34′36.80″N 13°36′43.06″W
- Website: aeroportdeconakry.com

Map
- Location of Airport in Guinea

Runways
Direction	Length		Surface
Direction	m	ft	Surface
06/24	3,300	10,827	Asphalt

Statistics (2012)
- Passengers: 360,007
- Stats GCM SkyVector

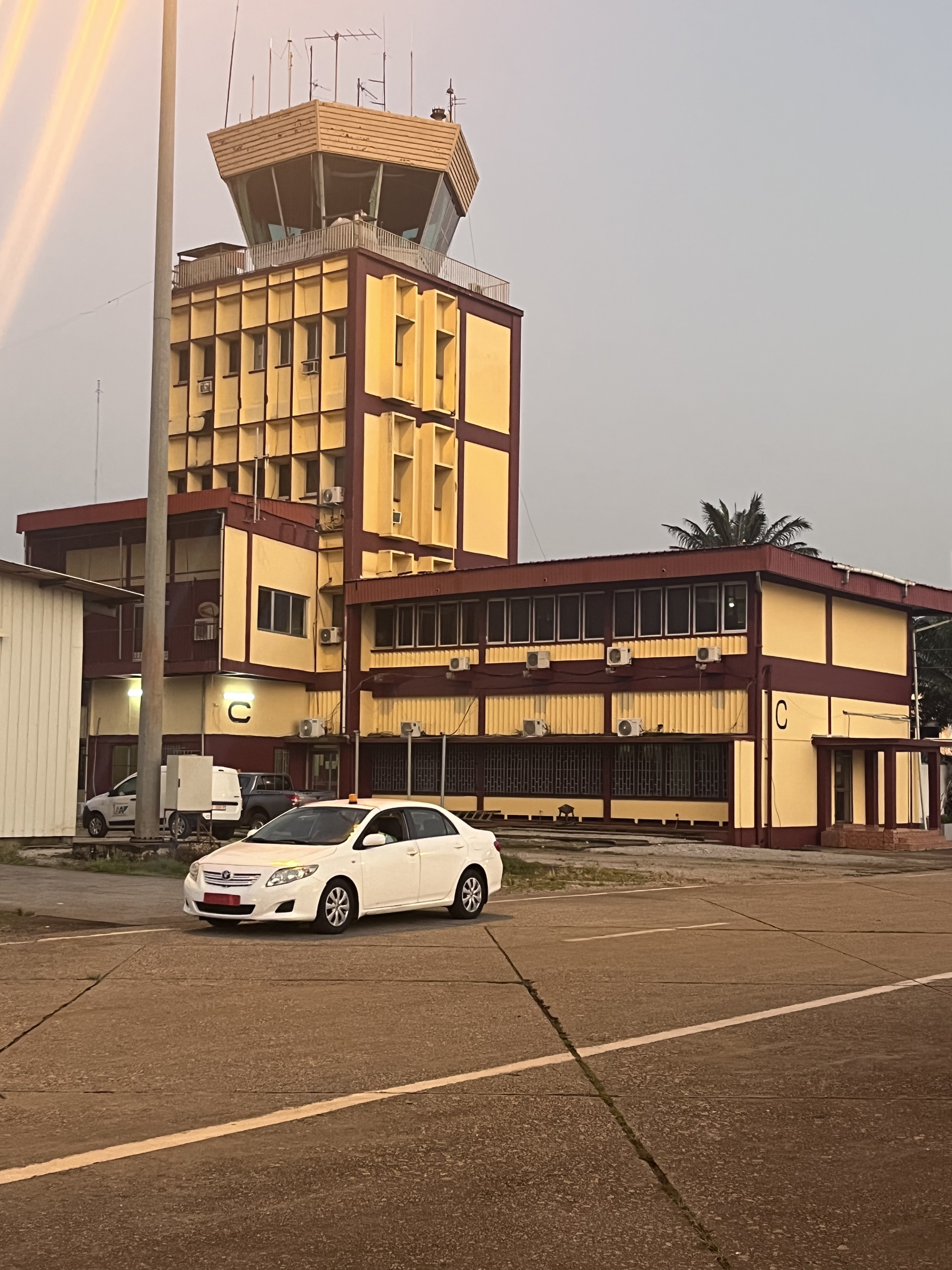
Ahmed Sékou Touré International Airport control tower in 2022

Ahmed Sékou Touré International Airport (IATA: CKY, ICAO: GUCY), also known as Gbessia International Airport, is an airport serving Conakry, capital of the Republic of Guinea in West Africa. It parallels the south shore of the Kaloum Peninsula approximately five kilometers from its tip. Autoroute Fidel Castro connects the airport to Conakry proper.

The Conakry VOR/DME (Ident: GIA) and Conakry NDB (Ident: CY) are located on the field.

== History ==
The airport was built in 1945.

In the 1970s, Soviet Naval Aviation was granted facilities at the airport to serve as a staging base for Atlantic maritime reconnaissance patrols by Tu-95RTs aircraft.

It was reported in 1975 that most of the Guinean air force's aircraft were based at Conakry-Gbessia Airport. Current air force operations are conducted out of the Conakry-Gbessia Airport.

In 2009, with a goal to increase annual passenger capacity to 1 million passengers, renovations began on the main terminal. Renovation costs amounted to 60 billion GNF (Around 85 million EUR). The government debated in 2007 whether to relocate the Conakry Airport to Forecariah, although no official changes have been declared, as of 2011. Traditionally, passengers embarked on all flights directly on the tarmac with transfers to the airport either by foot (most inter West African flights) or by buses for all European flights. The new renovations included gateways and an improved passenger departure lounge. As of January 2011, no changes have been made to the arrivals (customs and luggage carousels). The airport, as of 2012, has 360,000+ passengers per year.

On 13 December 2022, the Guinean State becomes 100% owner of SOGEAC, by acquiring 49% of the shares held by Aéroports De Paris (ADP), the French Development Agency (AFD) and the Chamber of Commerce and Industry of Bordeaux (CCIB) within the Conakry Airport Management and Exploitation Company (SOGEAC).

== Airlines and destinations ==
Airlines	Destinations
Africa World Airlines	Accra
Air Algérie	Algiers (begins 25 October 2026)
Air Côte d'Ivoire	Abidjan, Bamako, Monrovia–Roberts
Air France	Nouakchott, Paris–Charles de Gaulle
Air Peace	Bamako, Lagos
Air Senegal	Dakar–Diass
ASKY Airlines	Bamako, Lomé, Nouakchott
Brussels Airlines	Banjul, Brussels, Dakar–Diass, Freetown
Emirates	Dubai–International
Ethiopian Airlines	Abidjan, Addis Ababa, Ouagadougou
Mauritania Airlines	Dakar–Diass
Royal Air Maroc	Casablanca
Transair	Dakar–Diass
Tunisair	Dakar–Diass, Tunis
Turkish Airlines	Istanbul, Ouagadougou

== Incidents and accidents ==
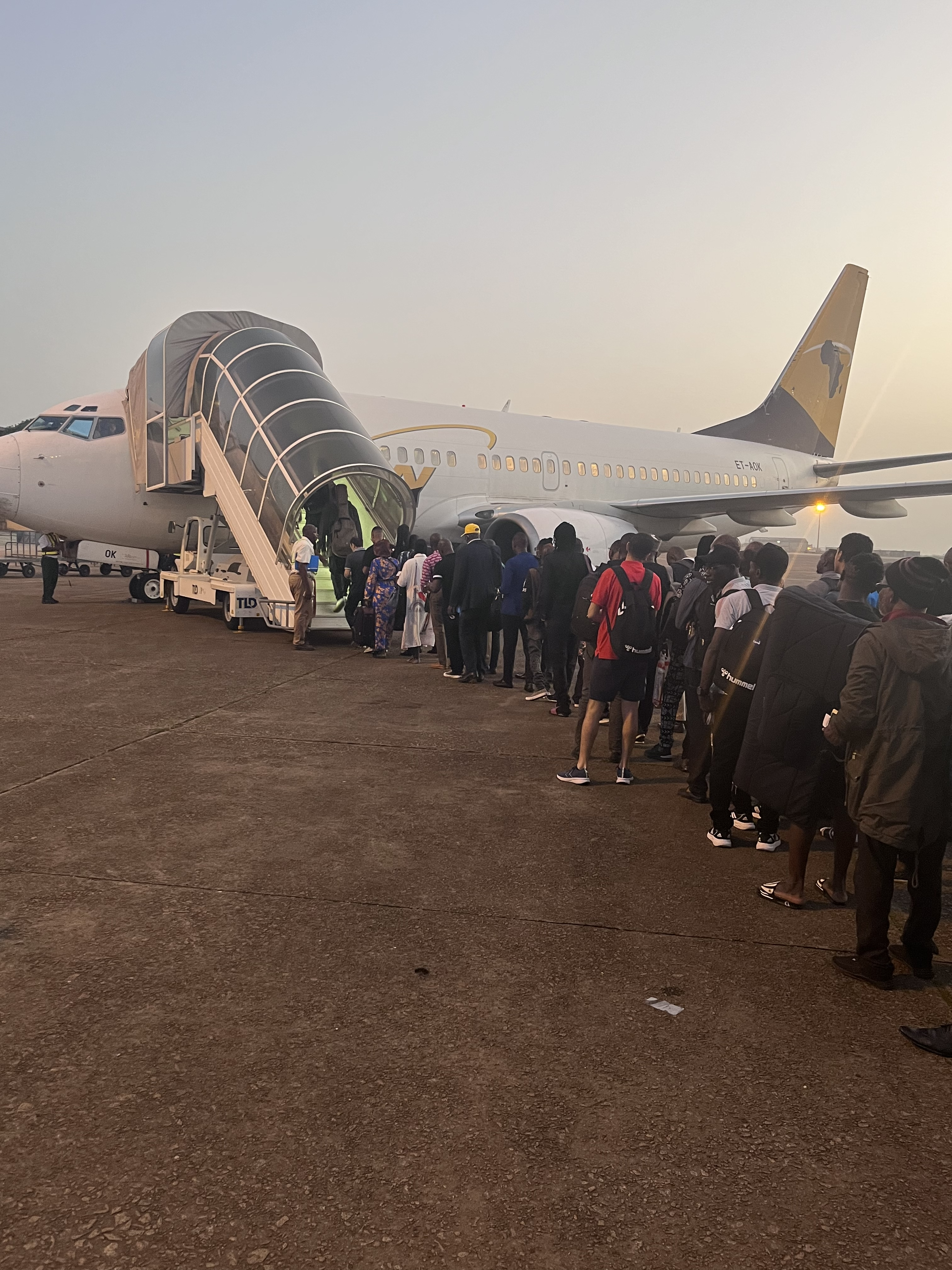
- Passengers boarding a flight at the Touré International Airport in 2022
  On 3 September 1978, an Air Guinee Ilyushin Il-18 from Moscow to Conakry crashed into marshland near Conakry. 15 of the total 17 occupants were killed. One crewmember and one passenger survived. The aircraft was destroyed.
- On 1 July 1983, a Chosonminhang (predecessor to Air Koryo) Ilyushin Il-62M on a non-scheduled international passenger flight from Pyongyang Sunan International Airport to Conakry via Kabul and Cairo crashed at the Fouta Djallon Mountains in Guinea. All 17 passengers and 6 crew on board were killed, and the aircraft was written off.
- On 19 November 2000, a Ghana Airways McDonnell Douglas DC-9 from Accra International Airport (in Accra) via Abidjan, Monrovia and Freetown with 42 passengers and 8 crew performed a gear-up landing in Conakry. The plane was written off.
- In 2007, a Guinean Air Force MiG-21 departing from Conakry crashed into the Radio Télévision Guinéenne headquarters. The Russian pilot ejected and was unharmed.
- On 28 July 2010, a Mauritania Airways Boeing 737 leased from Tunisair operating from Dakar to Conakry with 91 passengers and 6 crew overran the end of the runway in heavy rain. There were no fatalities, but the aircraft was damaged beyond repair.
- On 2 September 2022, engine 2 of TAP Air Portugal Flight 1492, an Airbus A320-251N, struck a motorcycle that crossed runway 24 during the plane's landing roll. Both riders on the motorcycle died; however, no one on board the plane was injured. The motorcycle driver was found to be an airport security agent. Engine 2 of the plane was damaged from the collision.

== See also ==
- Transport in Guinea
- List of airports in Guinea
