= Al Rida Airways =

IATA	ICAO	Call sign
-	LRW	AL RIDA

Al Rida Airways was an airline based in Mauritania.

== See also ==
- List of defunct airlines of Mauritania
