= 1983 CAAK Ilyushin Il-62 crash =

1983 aviation accident near Labé, Guinea

1983 Civil Aviation Administration of Korea Ilyushin Il-62 crash
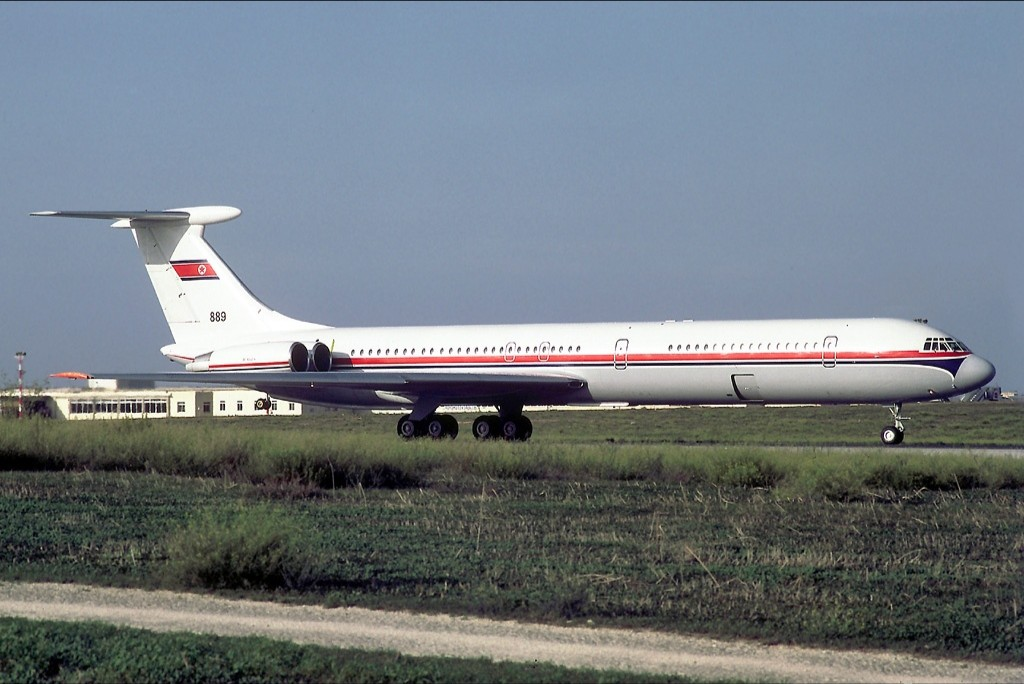
- P-889, the aircraft involved in the accident, pictured in 1982

Accident
- Date: 1 July 1983
- Summary: Controlled flight into terrain
- Site: Near Labé, Guinea; 11.32°N 12.3°W

Aircraft
- Aircraft type: Ilyushin Il-62M
- Operator: Civil Aviation Administration of Korea
- Registration: P-889
- Flight origin: Pyongyang Sunan International Airport, Pyongyang, North Korea
- 1st stopover: Kabul International Airport, Kabul, Afghanistan
- Last stopover: Cairo International Airport, Cairo, Egypt
- Destination: Conakry International Airport, Conakry, Guinea
- Occupants: 23
- Passengers: 17
- Crew: 6
- Fatalities: 23
- Survivors: 0

On 1 July 1983, a Civil Aviation Administration of Korea (CAAK) Ilyushin Il-62M was operating a scheduled international charter flight from Pyongyang, North Korea to Conakry, Guinea via Bamako, Mali. It carried 17 passengers and 6 crew members, a total of 23 occupants. While approaching Conakry International Airport, it crashed into mountainous terrain. All 23 occupants on board were killed.

The aircraft was flying from Pyongyang with construction cargo and workers ahead of the 1984 Organization of African Unity summit due to take place the following year.

It remains the deadliest aviation accident in Guinean history, and was the tenth operational loss of an Il-62 since its introduction. It remains the first and only known fatal aviation accident involving the airline.

== Flight ==
On 1 July 1983, the aircraft involved, P-889, was carrying construction material, as well as North Korean experts, construction workers and technicians from Pyongyang, North Korea, to complete work on a conference hall, dubbed the "Palace of Nations", ahead of the twentieth Organization of African Unity summit scheduled to take place in Conakry, Guinea, in May 1984. The flight was operated by the CAAK. The aircraft took off from Pyongyang International Airport en route to Conakry International Airport via Kabul, Afghanistan, and Cairo, Egypt.

According to the Bureau of Aircraft Accidents Archives, whilst attempting to land at Conakry International Airport, the aircraft encountered poor weather conditions during its descent and the crew failed to take note of their low altitude; the aircraft subsequently crashed in the Guinean highland region of Fouta Djallon, near the town of Labé, 160 miles northwest of the airport. All 23 passengers and crew were killed.

== Aftermath ==
The crash is Guinea's deadliest aviation accident and is the airline's only known fatal accident. News of the crash was slow to spread and was only announced on 4 July due to difficulties in reaching the remote crash site. Per the Associated Press, as "Guinea has a reputation for being one of the most secretive countries in the region", citing the BBC, "the lack of official details about the crash is not surprising."

Initial reports from a radio based in Conakry did not give details surrounding the accident, such as when the plane crashed nor the amount of casualties, only calling what happened a catastrophe. The Democratic Party of Guinea called the crash a disaster. The Guinean Government declared two days of national mourning, ordering all bars and dance halls to be closed, flags to be flown at half mast, and all political meetings to begin with a minute of silence, with officials being urged to "pay their respects before the remains of the victims" at the North Korean embassy in Conakry, Guinea. A high-level delegation of Guinean government officials traveled to North Korea shortly after the crash to deliver official condolences to Kim Il Sung.

By 5 July 1983, the cause of the crash was not given. The cause remains publicly unknown. However, Airways News reported that pilot error compounded by fatigue was suspected to be the cause.

== See also ==
- Eastern Air Lines Flight 980
- Aeroflot Flight 498
- Aeroflot Flight 5463
- Thai Airways International Flight 311
