= Economy of Mauritania =

Coordinates: 21°17′43″N 15°54′27″W

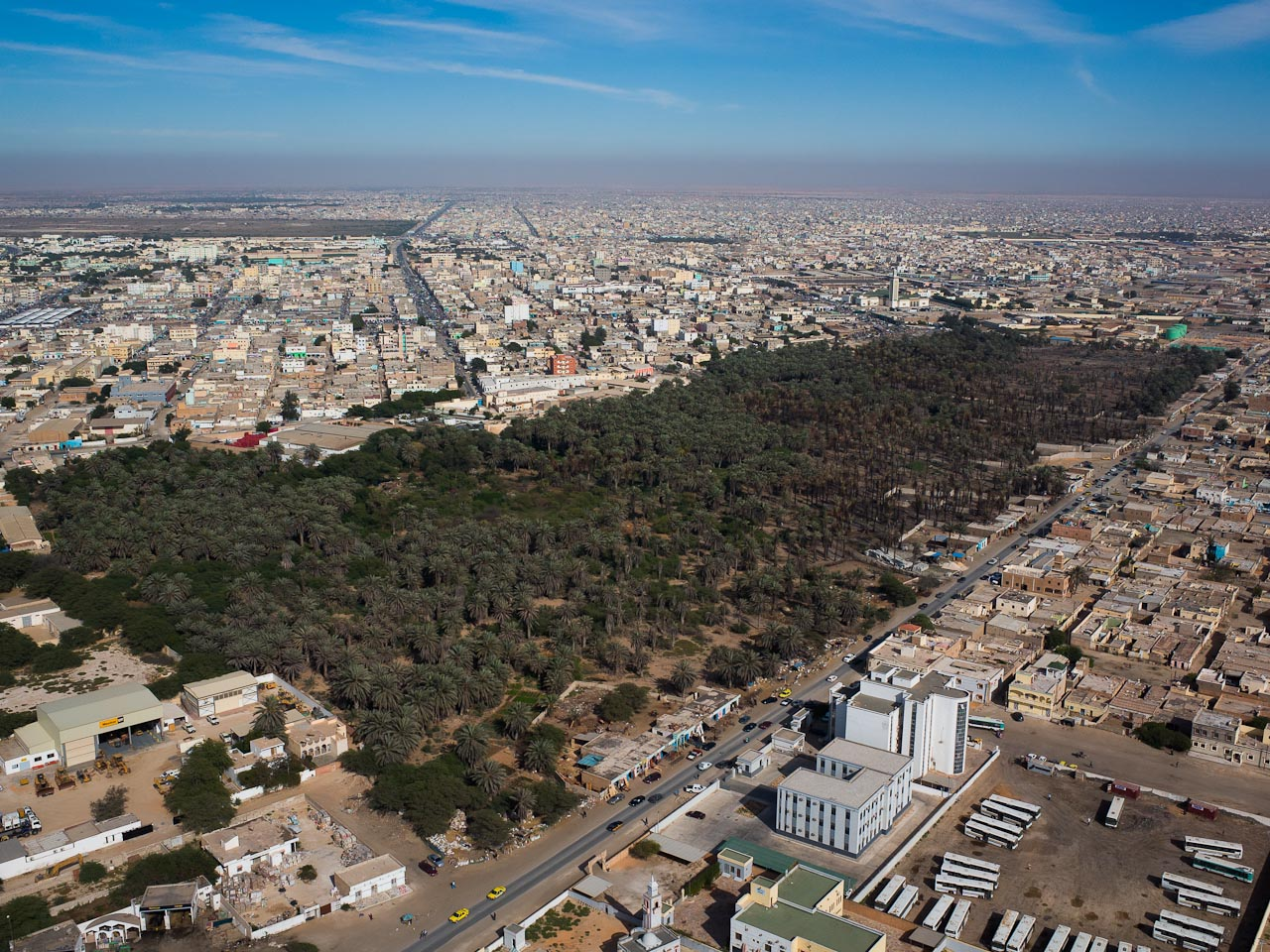
- Nouakchott
- Currency: Ouguiya (MRU, UM)
- Fiscal year: Calendar Year
- Trade organisations: AU, AfCFTA, AfDB, CEN-SAD, WTO, Group of 77

Statistics
- GDP: ▲$10.966 billion (nominal, 2023f); ▲$32.948 billion (PPP, 2023f)
- GDP growth: 3.6% (2018f); 6.7% (2019f)
- GDP per capita: ▲$2,475 (nominal, 2023f); ▲$7,437 (PPP, 2023f)
- GDP per capita growth: 1.2% (2025)
- GDP by sector: agriculture (14.9%) industry (48.0%) services (37.1%) (2012 est.)
- Inflation (CPI): ▼3% (2018f)
- Population below national poverty line: 40% (2004 est.)
- Gini coefficient: 39 (2000)
- Human Development Index: ▼0.556 low (2021) (158st); 0.358 IHDI (2018)
- Labour force: 1.318 million (2007)
- Labour force by occupation: agriculture (50.0%) industry (2%) services (48%) (2001 est.)
- Unemployment: 30% (2008 est.)
- Main industries: mining (iron ore, gold, copper, gypsum), petroleum, fish processing

External
- Exports: ▲$4.14 billion (2021)
- Export goods: iron ore, petroleum, gold, copper, gypsum, & fish.::.
- Main export partners: People's Republic of China: 55.4% European Union 32.39% African Union12.55% Australia 3.36% Japan 1.18% (2021)
- Imports: ▲$4.72 billion (2021)
- Import goods: machinery; petroleum products; & foods.:.
- Main import partners: European Union: 28.94% People's Republic of China: 21.85% Arab League 18.73% United States 5.72% Indonesia 3.07%
- Gross external debt: ▲$2.897 billion (31 December 2012 est.)

Public finance
- Revenue: $1.143 billion (2012 est.)
- Spending: $1.263 billion (2012 est.)
- All values, unless otherwise stated, are in US dollars.

Mauritania has a developing economy. It is still largely based on agriculture, mining and livestock, even though most of the nomads and many subsistence farmers were forced into the cities by recurring droughts in the 1970s and 1980s.

The nation has extensive deposits of iron ore, which account for almost 50% of total exports. The decline in world demand for this ore, however, has led to cutbacks in production. With the current rise in metal prices, gold and copper mining companies are opening mines in the interior.

The nation's coastal waters are among the richest fishing areas in the world, but overexploitation by foreigners threatens this key source of revenue. The country's first deep water port opened near Nouakchott in 1986.

In recent years, drought and economic mismanagement have resulted in a buildup of foreign debt. In March 1999, the government signed an agreement with a joint World Bank-International Monetary Fund mission on a $54 million enhanced structural adjustment facility (ESAF). The economic objectives have been set for 1999–2002. Privatization remains one of the key issues.

== Sectors ==
=== Energy ===
==== Natural gas and the Tortue/Ahmeyim project ====
In 2015, Kosmos Energy made significant natural gas discoveries on the maritime border between Senegal and Mauritania, and in December 2016, it entered into partnership with British Petroleum. The two companies, along with Mauritanian and Senegalese governments and the two countries' national oil companies, are optimistic about the potential of these gas discoveries. The Grand Tortue/Ahmeyim reserves are estimated at 15 trillion cubic feet. According to BP, 'that's equivalent to all of Africa's current gas production for nearly seven years.' The production phase will begin in 2022, starting with 2.3 million tons annually.

==== Dispute with Woodside Petroleum ====
In February 2006, the new Mauritanian government denounced amendments to an oil contract made by former Leader Ould Taya with Woodside Petroleum, an Australian company. In 2004, Woodside had agreed to invest US$600 million in developing Mauritania's Chinguetti offshore oil project. The controversial amendments, which Mauritanian authorities declared had been signed "outside the legal framework of normal practice, to the great detriment of our country", could cost Mauritania up to $200 million a year, according to BBC News. Signed by Woodside two weeks after the February 1, 2005, legislation authorizing the four amendments, they provided for a lower state quota in the profit-oil, and reduced taxes by 15 percent in certain zones. They also eased environmental constraints and extended the length and scope of the exploitation and exploration monopoly, among other measures.

The disputed amendments were signed by former Oil Minister Zeidane Ould Hmeida in February 2004 and March 2005. Hmeida was arrested in January 2006 on charges of "serious crimes against the country's essential economic interests".

Nouakchott's authorities declared that the government would likely seek international arbitration, which Woodside (which operated for Hardman, BG Group, Premier Oil, ROC Oil, Fusion, Petronas, Dana Petroleum, Energy Africa and the Hydrocarbons Mauritanian Society) also contemplated.

Discovered in 2001, Chinguetti has proven reserves of about 120,000,000 barrels (19,000,000 m^{3}) of oil. At the end of December 2005, authorities estimated that in 2006, the oil profits would be 47 billion ouguiyas (about US$180 million) and represent a quarter of the state budget, according to RFI.

Some U.S. oil companies are alleged to be playing a part in Mauritania's oil related corruption.

=== Mining ===
Mauritania's mineral sector was dominated by iron ore mining and beneficiation. Other mineral commodities produced in the country included cement, copper, gold, gypsum, petroleum, salt, and steel. The 'Ministère des Mines et de l’Industrie' was the Government agency responsible for enacting the Mining Code and for the coordination of all activities in the mining sector. The 'Direction des Mines et de la Géologie' was the entity responsible for promoting the mineral sector and for providing geologic and mining information to potential investors; the 'Direction des Hydrocarbures' was in charge of the development of the petroleum sector; and the 'Office Mauritanien des Recherches Géologiques' was the Government entity responsible for evaluating areas of mineral potential for exploration. The 'Société Nationale Industrielle et Minière (SNIM)' was responsible for iron ore production and beneficiation.

In 2007, the total value of exports from Mauritania was estimated to be about $1.5 billion. Excluding fish exports, which amounted to $254 million, all the main export categories were either mining or hydrocarbon products. Iron ore exports, which were valued at $575 million, represented about 38% of the country’s total exports; crude oil exports were valued at $339 million and accounted for 23%; copper exports were valued at $184 million and accounted for about 13%; and gold exports were valued at $59 million and accounted for 4% of total exports.

All mineral commodity production increased during the year, with the exception of crude petroleum, which decreased by about 51% to 5,487,000 barrels (872,400 m^{3}) compared with 11,168,000 barrels (1,775,600 m^{3}) in 2006. Cement production increased by 14.6% to 409,513 metric tons (t) compared with a revised 357,239 t in 2006. Gypsum production increased by 8.9%; iron ore production, by 6.8%; salt production, by about 35.5%; and crude steel production, by about 4.2%. The sharp increase in copper and gold production was owing to the opening of the Guelb Mohgrein Mine in late 2006.

Mining, which was one of the country’s most important sectors to the national economy, contributed about 12% of the gross domestic product (GDP) and represented more than one-half of the country’s export earnings in 2005. According to the Ministère des Mines et de l’industrie (MMi), the development, diversification, and promotion of the mining sector have become the government’s priority in recent years. The number of foreign companies applying for prospecting licenses was increasing, and projects were at various stages, ranging from grassroots exploration to mine development.

=== Agriculture ===
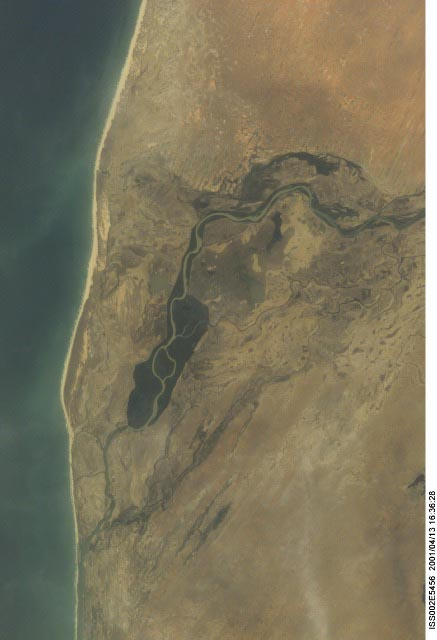
The Sénégal River

Located in the Sahelian and Saharan zones, Mauritania has one of the least developed agricultural bases in West Africa. Arable land represents less than 0.5 percent of the country, leaving it particularly reliant on food imports.

According to the Food and Agriculture Organization of the United Nations (FAO): "The rural sector is one of the most important in the Mauritanian economy. Indeed, over sixty two percent (62%) of the population depend on rural activities for their livelihoods. Rural activities are responsible for 17% of the GDP and are the second highest source of employment in the country (about 21% of the working population). Finally, the sector contributes significantly to meet the country's consumption needs of cereals (30%), red meat (100%) and milk (30%). The useful agricultural area (UAA) represents less than 0.5% of the country (estimated at 502,000 ha). Moreover, 44% of the UAA, or 220,000 ha, is cultivated with rainfed production systems (...) that are highly dependent on rainfall, the water flow and thus on the quality of water infrastructures".

A major reason for Mauritania's economic stagnation since the mid-1970s has been the decline of its rural sector. Government planners neglected both herding and farming until the 1980s, concentrating instead on development in modern sectors such as mining. In the 1960s, livestock and crop production together provided 35 to 45 percent of GDP (at constant 1982 prices). From 1970 to 1986, their contribution to GDP (at constant 1982 prices) averaged 28 percent, with herding accounting for about 20 percent of this figure and with crop production falling to as low as 3 to 5 percent in the worst drought years. This has led to a particular exposition to climate change and the rural sector has been severely affected by droughts, sporadic dry spells and flooding.

Most important to the rural economy has been the livestock subsector. Between 1975 and 1980, herding engaged up to 70 percent of the population, and sedentary farmers constituted about 20 percent of the population. The vast majority of the population lived in the southern one-third of the country, where rainfall levels were high enough to sustain cattle herding. Farming was restricted to the narrow band along the Senegal River where rainfall of up to 600 millimeters per year and annual river flooding sustained crop production as well as large cattle herds. In the dry northern two-thirds of the country, herding was limited to widely scattered pastoral groups that raised camels, sheep, and goats, and farming was restricted to date palms and minuscule plots around oases.

=== Tourism ===
In 2010's, Mauritania visited by 1,500 tourists each year. This number is extremely low relative to size of local population. In late May 2019 total local population of Mauritania stood at 4,077,000 inhabitants. This gives a ratio of 1 tourist for every 2,718 locals.

Along with some on the ancient settlements listed below, other tourist highlights in the Mauritanian Sahara include the Richat Structure just beyond Ouadane, Fort Saganne, the nearby Amojjar Pass and the sandy Tifoujar Pass; Terjit oasis and the medieval ruins of Ksar el Barka.

=== Education ===
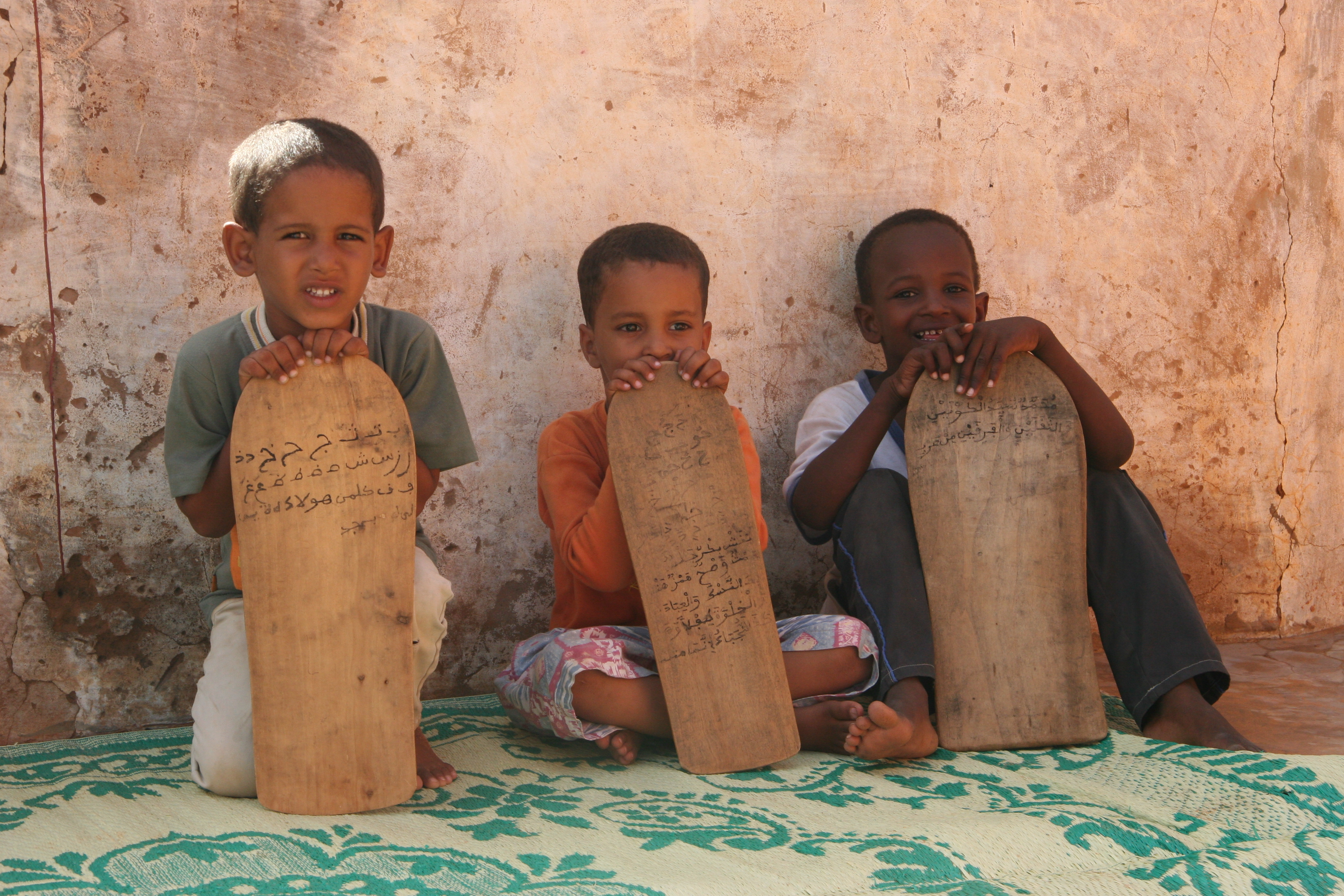
Young madrasah pupils in Mauritania.

In Mauritania education is compulsory between the ages of 6 and 14. In 2002, the gross primary enrollment rate was 88 percent, and the net primary enrollment rate was 68 percent. Gross and net enrollment ratios are based on the number of students formally registered in primary school and therefore do not necessarily reflect actual school attendance. In 1996, 41.8 percent of children ages 7 to 14 years were attending school. As of 2001, 61 percent of children who started primary school were likely to reach grade 5. However, a lack of adequate school facilities and teachers, particularly in rural areas, is likely to impede the full realization of the government’s goal of universal primary education in Mauritania until at least 2007.

Public school is free, but other costs such as books and lunches make education unaffordable for many poor children. Ongoing challenges to the provision of quality education in Mauritania include high dropout and repetition rates, inadequate curriculum, and a poor national infrastructure that prevents children from traveling to and from school. In 2002, a World Food Program (WFP) survey of out-of-school children in Mauritania found that 25 percent did not attend school due to the need to support their families or perform domestic work, and another 22 percent did not attend due to the distance to school.

== Infrastructure ==
=== Electricity ===
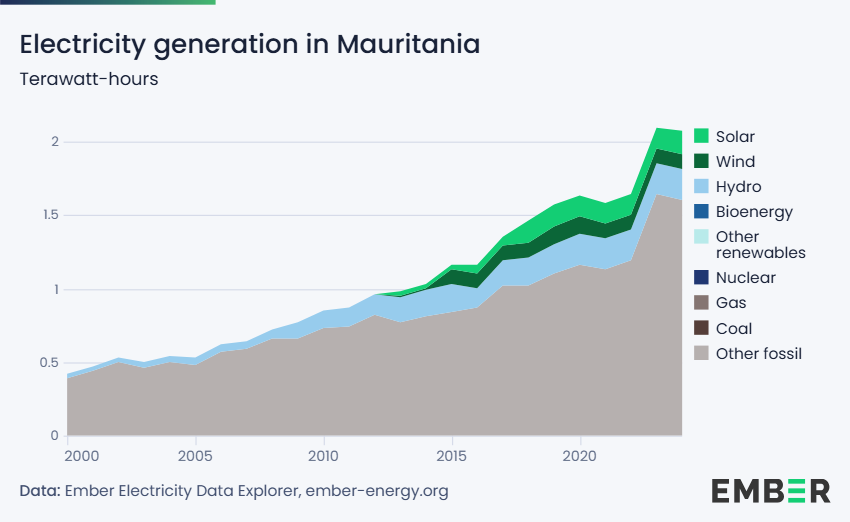
Electricity generation in Mauritania in terawatt-hours

Mauritania has 380 MW of generating capacity, of which 263 MW are fossil fuels and 117 MW are renewable. Its sunny weather makes solar power highly favorable, and eight plants totaling 16.6 MW were installed with the support of Masdar in 2016.

=== Telecommunications ===
Telephones - main lines in use: 300,500 (2024)

Telephones - mobile cellular: 200,000 (2003)

Telephone system: general assessment: limited system of cable and open-wire lines, minor microwave radio relay links, and radiotelephone communications stations (improvements being made)

domestic: mostly cable and open-wire lines; a recently completed domestic satellite telecommunications system links Nouakchott with regional capitals.

international: country code +222; satellite earth stations - 9 Intelsat (Atlantic Ocean) and 20 Arabsat.

Radio broadcast stations: AM 1, FM 14, shortwave 1 (2001)

Radios: 410,000 (2001)

Television broadcast stations: 20 (2024)

Televisions: 708,000 (2001)

Internet Service Providers (ISPs): 26 (2014)

Internet users: 250,000 (2002)

Country code (Top level domain): .mr

=== Transport ===
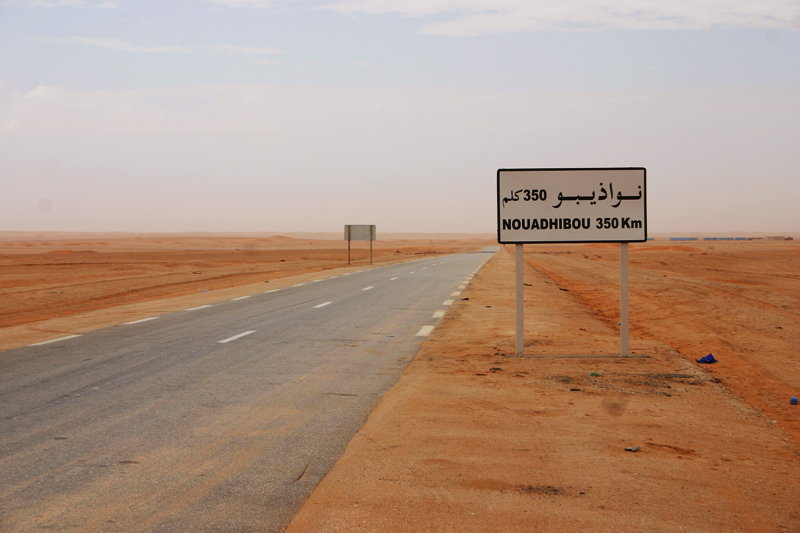
Photograph of the Cairo–Dakar Highway taken near Nouadhibou

Citizens of Mauritania have limited access to transportation. The single-line railroad serves mining interests with very occasional ad hoc passenger services. Apart from two infrastructural road developments there are few paved roads.

== Diversification ==
In 2007, mining industries accounted for well over 35 percent of the Mauritanian economy, with the fish industry so much as 54% (with big changes between these industries in the power relationship). Diversification of the economy into non-mining industries remains a long-term issue. Mauritania is a net importer of food, reportedly importing 70% of its domestic food needs.

== Economic statistics ==
Exports of Mauritania by product category (2019) Chemical products Transportation Machines Mineral products Plastics and rubbers Metals Foodstuffs Precious metals Textiles Instruments Animal products Vegetable products Paper goods Footwear and headwear Miscellaneous Stone and glass Wood products Animal and vegetable bi-products Animal hides Arts and antiques Weapons

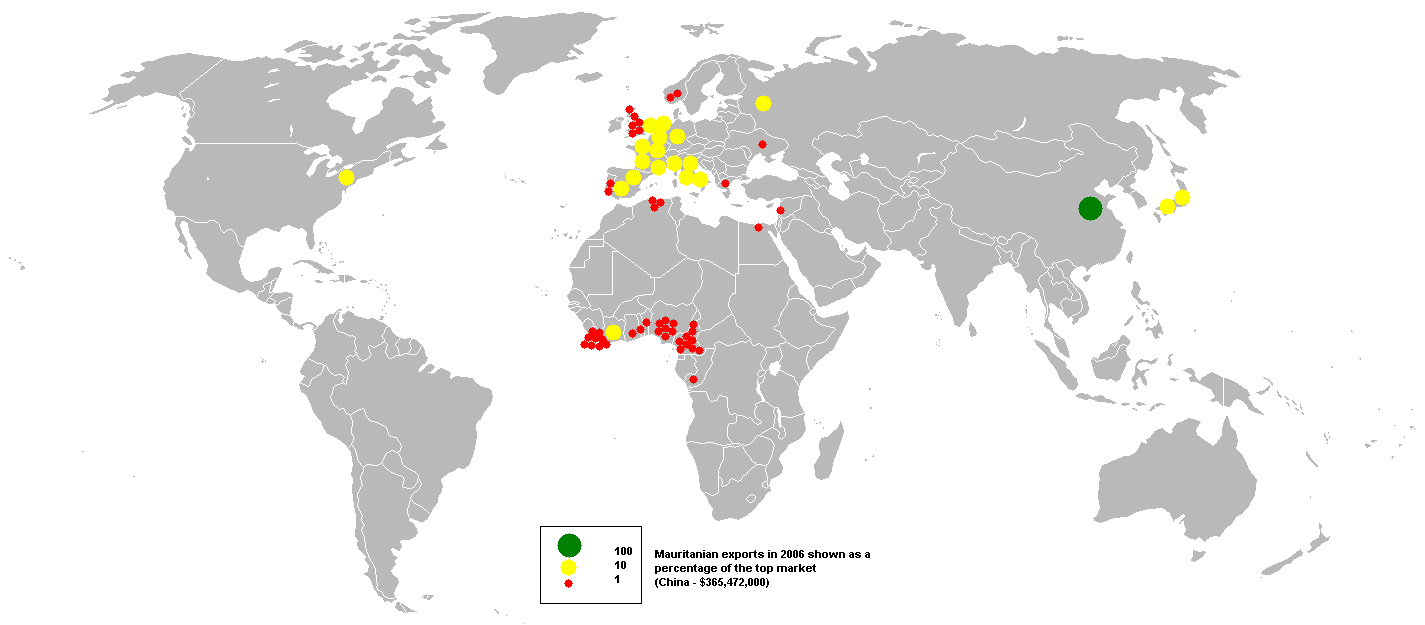
Mauritanian exports in 2006

Current GDP per capita of Mauritania grew 82% in the 60s reaching a peak growth of 166% in the 70s. But this proved unsustainable, and growth consequently scaled back to 14% in the 80s. Finally, it shrank by 29% in the 90s. Mean wages were $0.97 per man-hour in 2009.

The following table shows the main economic indicators in 1990–2026. Inflation below 5% is in green.

| Year | GDP (in bil. US$ PPP) | GDP per capita (in US$ PPP) | GDP (in bil. US$ nominal) | GDP growth (real) | Inflation (%) | Government debt (% of GDP) |
|---|---|---|---|---|---|---|
| 1990 | 5.8 | 2886 | 1.8 | n/a | n/a | n/a |
| 1995 | ▲7.5 | ▲3253 | ▲2.1 | ▲9.8 | ▲6.5 | n/a |
| 2000 | ▲8.4 | ▼3187 | ▼1.8 | ▼ -3.9 | ▲3.3 | ▲55.5 |
| 2005 | ▲11.5 | ▲3790 | ▲2.9 | ▲8.6 | ▲12.1 | ▲71.1 |
| 2006 | ▲14.1 | ▲4770 | ▲4.0 | ▲18.3 | ▲6.2 | ▼38.0 |
| 2007 | ▲14.2 | ▼4672 | ▲4.3 | ▼ -2.0 | ▲7.3 | ▲61.5 |
| 2008 | ▲14.4 | ▼4619 | ▲5.1 | ▼ -0.3 | ▲7.5 | ▼57.2 |
| 2009 | ▲14.5 | ▼4532 | ▼4.7 | ▲0.1 | ▲2.1 | ▼54.3 |
| 2010 | ▲15.1 | ▲4589 | ▲5.6 | ▲2.6 | ▲6.3 | ▼43.9 |
| 2011 | ▲16.0 | ▲4756 | ▲6.8 | ▲4.2 | ▲5.7 | ▼38.8 |
| 2012 | ▲17.1 | ▲4938 | ▼6.7 | ▲4.5 | ▲4.9 | ▲39.3 |
| 2013 | ▲18.1 | ▲5107 | ▲7.3 | ▲4.2 | ▲4.1 | ▲40.7 |
| 2014 | ▲19.2 | ▲5292 | ▼6.6 | ▲4.3 | ▲3.8 | ▲49.5 |
| 2015 | ▲20.4 | ▲5500 | ▼6.2 | ▲5.4 | ▲2.7 | ▲59.9 |
| 2016 | ▲20.8 | ▼5493 | ▲6.4 | ▲1.3 | ▲1.5 | ▼57.6 |
| 2017 | ▲22.5 | ▲5807 | ▲6.8 | ▲6.3 | ▲2.3 | ▼55.7 |
| 2018 | ▲23.6 | ▲5932 | ▲7.5 | ▲4.8 | ▲3.1 | ▲59.2 |
| 2019 | ▲25.1 | ▲6176 | ▲7.9 | ▲3.1 | ▲2.3 | ▼57.7 |
| 2020 | ▲26.4 | ▲6367 | ▲8.5 | ▼ -0.4 | ▲2.4 | ▼56.5 |
| 2021 | ▲27.6 | ▲6518 | ▲9.1 | ▲0.7 | ▲3.6 | ▼54.5 |
| 2022 | ▲31.6 | ▲7294 | ▲9.6 | ▲6.8 | ▲9.6 | ▼50.3 |
| 2023 | ▲35.0 | ▲7904 | ▲10.7 | ▲6.8 | ▲4.9 | ▼48.6 |
| 2024 | ▲38.1 | ▲8424 | ▲11.0 | ▲6.3 | ▲2.5 | ▼45.1 |
| 2025 | ▲40.9 | ▲8832 | ▲12.3 | ▲4.2 | ▲1.6 | ▼40.1 |
| 2026 | ▲43.9 | ▲9280 | ▲14.4 | ▲4.4 | ▲4.1 | ▼37.1 |

== See also ==
- Ministry of Finance (Mauritania)
- List of companies based in Mauritania
- United Nations Economic Commission for: Africa & Western Asia
- Slavery in Mauritania
