= Nouakchott International Airport =

Former airport in Mauritania

Nouakchott International Airport مطار نواكشوط الدولي
- IATA: ~~NKC~~; ICAO: ~~GQNN~~

Summary
- Airport type: Defunct
- Owner: Najah for Major Works (NMW)
- Serves: Nouakchott, Mauritania
- Elevation AMSL: 7 ft (2.1 m)
- Coordinates: 18°05′43″N 015°56′58″W

Map
- Location of airport in Mauritania

Runways
Direction	Length		Surface
Direction	m	ft	Surface
~~05/23~~	~~3,010~~	~~9,876~~	~~Asphalt~~
- Source: DAFIF

Nouakchott International Airport (ICAO: GQNN) (Arabic: مطار نواكشوط الدولي) was an airport located in Nouakchott, the capital of Mauritania. It closed in June 2016 upon the opening of Nouakchott–Oumtounsy International Airport, 25 kilometres (16 mi) north of the city. Until late 2010, the airport served as hub of Mauritania Airways.

Mauritania Airlines International was based at the airport until the closure.

== Accidents and incidents ==
- On July 6, 1965, a Douglas C-47-DL (6V-AAA) of Air Mauritanie was damaged beyond repair in a non-fatal landing mishap.
- On March 14, 1979, a Fairchild F-27A (5T-CJY) of Air Mauritanie was damaged beyond repair in a non-fatal crash landing during a sandstorm.
- On August 9, 1996, a Fokker F-28 Fellowship 4000 (5T-CLG) of Air Mauritanie was flying to Nouakchott from Las Palmas when a passenger, a policeman from Zouerate, attempted to hijack the plane to Morocco. The pilot disarmed him, leaving a bullet lodged in the ceiling. The plane landed safely at Nouakchott undamaged; the hijacker gave no motive.
- On August 26, 2010, an Astraeus Boeing 757-200 registered G-STRY (operating for BMI) carrying 108 passengers was forced to land at the airport after experiencing vibrations in both its engines. The plane was flying from Freetown to London when its pilot chose to divert to Nouakchott. There were no casualties. The final report said that the cause of the incident was icing.
- On 12 July 2012, a Harbin Y-12 aircraft belonging to the military crashed while attempting to take off from Nouakchott International Airport, killing all seven people on board. The plane had been chartered by Canadian gold miner Kinross Gold to carry gold from its Tasiast Gold Mine. The cause was not immediately known, but witnesses said the aircraft caught fire before it went down.
- On September 27, 2013, a Boeing 747-428M (9M-ACM) of Nasair leased from Eaglexpress arrived from Jeddah on a ferry flight to pick of passengers headed to Madinah. While parking in position no. 6, the left-wing tip hit a mast and received minor damage.
