= Nouadhibou International Airport =

Airport serving Nouadhibou, Mauritania

Nouadhibou International Airport مطار نواذيبو الدولي (Arabic) Aéroport international de Nouadhibou (French)
- IATA: NDB; ICAO: GQPP

Summary
- Airport type: Public
- Operator: Government of Mauritania
- Serves: Nouadhibou, Mauritania
- Elevation AMSL: 16 ft (4.9 m)
- Coordinates: 20°55′59″N 017°01′47″W

Map
- Location of airport in Mauritania

Runways
Direction	Length		Surface
Direction	m	ft	Surface
02/20	2,427	7,961	Asphalt
- Source: DAFIF

Nouadhibou International Airport (IATA: NDB, ICAO: GQPP) is an international airport serving Nouadhibou (formerly Port-Étienne), a city in the Dakhlet Nouadhibou region of Mauritania.

== Airlines and destinations ==
Airlines	Destinations
Mauritania Airlines	Gran Canaria, Nouakchott, Zouérat

== Accidents and incidents ==
- On July 2, 1942, a Lockheed 18-07-01 Lodestar (F-ARTL) of Air France crashed shortly after takeoff. All 3 occupants survived and the plane was written off.
- On August 7, 1980, a Tupolev Tu-154B-1 (YR-TPH) of Tarom arriving from Bucharest was approaching and the crew couldn't see the runway at the 90 meter decision height. The plane contacted water 300 meters short of the runway at 03:04, which the pilot mistook for dry land, leading to a missed approach procedure being initiated. 1 passenger out of the 168 occupants was killed, and the plane was written off.
- On April 10, 2001, an Antonov An-12BK (3C-AWU) of Air West Co. departing for Nouakchott made a forced landing on the beach 6 km from the runway during initial climb after one of the engines caught fire; the plane later burnt out. All 6 occupants survived.
