= Mauritanian Post Company =

Company responsible for postal service in Mauritania

- الشركة الموريتانية للبريد; La Société Mauritanienne des Postes
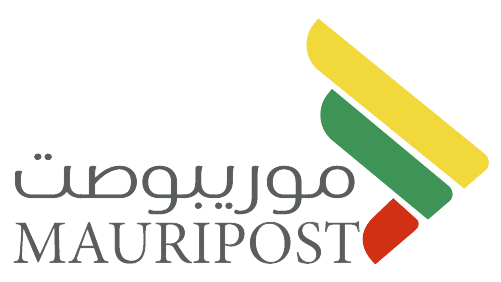

Agency overview
- Formed: 29 December 1999
- Headquarters: Mauritania
- Website: www.mauripost.post

La Société Mauritanienne des Postes, or Mauripost, is the company responsible for postal service in Mauritania. The company founded in 1999 and is the official postal operator of the country. Mauritania Postal Service became a regular member of the Universal Postal Union (1967).

== History ==
La Société Mauritanienne des Postes was established 29 December 1999 by the decree № 99-157 / MP / MIPT within the division of the Bureau of Posts and Telecommunications (French: Office des Postes et Télécommunications – OPT).

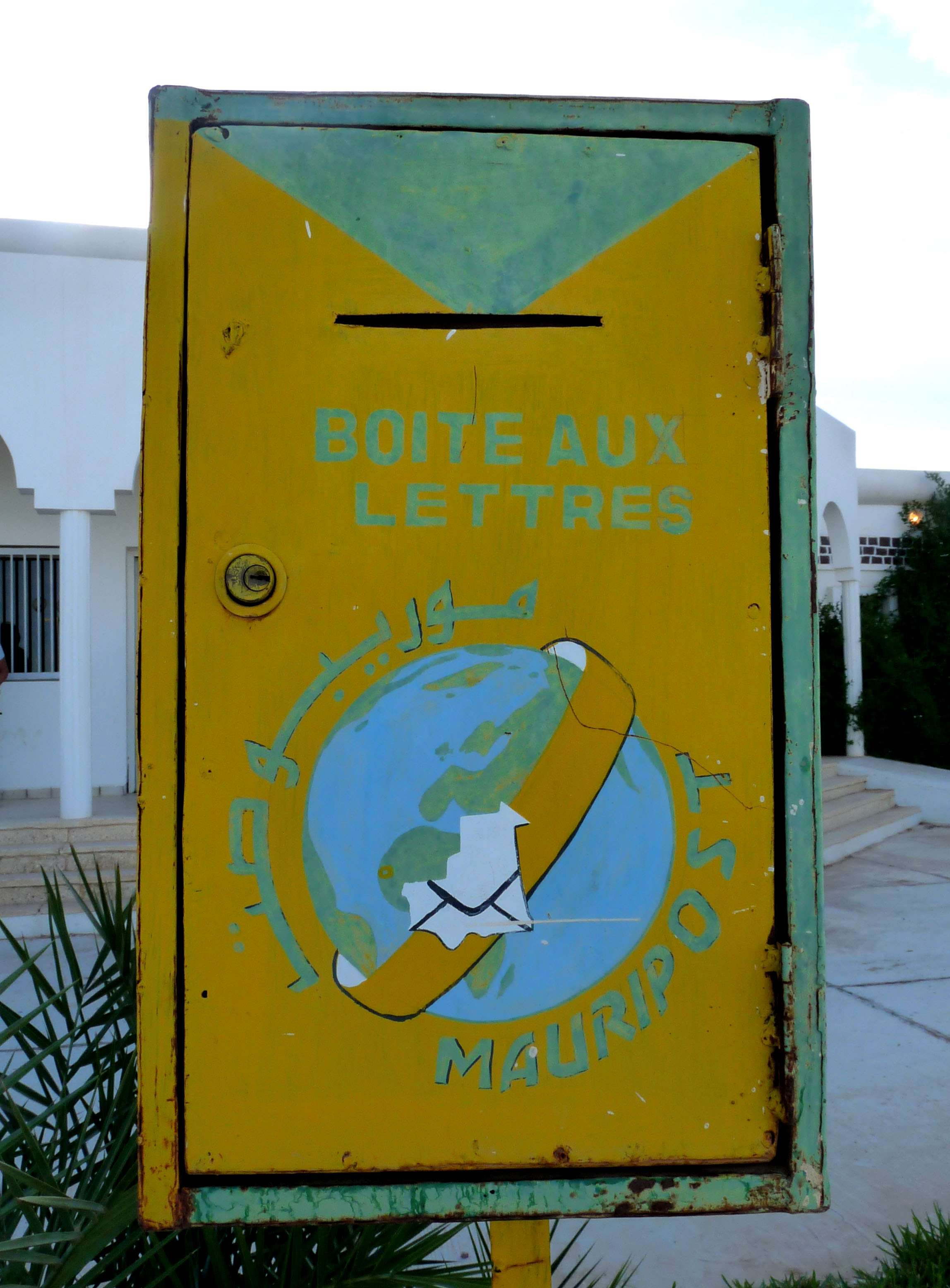
Old Mauripost post box in Adrar.

== Services provided ==
"Mauritanian postal company" carries out postal service between provincial capitals, carries out money transfers, money orders, processing of mail checks, savings operations, and investment activities.

Mauripost activities were regulated by the 2004 law № 2004-015 in Mauritania "Regarding Mail". In accordance with the 2001 law № 2001-18 of Mauritania, the body that regulates activities in postal services in Mauritania (along with telecommunications, electricity and water supply) is the Autorité de Régulation (French) or Regulatory Authority.

== Organizational structure ==
The Organization of Mauripost includes four operating departments and three research departments.

=== Operating departments ===
- Department of Postal Financial Services (responsible for postal checks & savings operations).
- Nouakchott Post Office (mail forwarding & requirements for international mail addresses associated with international financial reporting).
- Department of the postal network (mail & domestic and international money orders processed by regional post offices).
- Department of express letters (express post office & postal delivery).

=== Research Branch ===
- Research and Development Department (responsible for interaction with international organizations and philately).
- Audit and Control (exercising control and audit functions, is responsible for participation in legal proceedings).
- Finance and Administration Department (finance and accounting, human resources, training, & information systems management).

== Leadership ==
As of 2010, the company's CEO is Mustafa Ould Abdallah (Moustapha Ould Abdallah).

== Headquarters ==
The company's management is located in the Mauritanian capital, Nouakchott, in the central post office, at BP 10 000.
