= Mauritania Airways =

Airline of Mauritania (2007–2010)

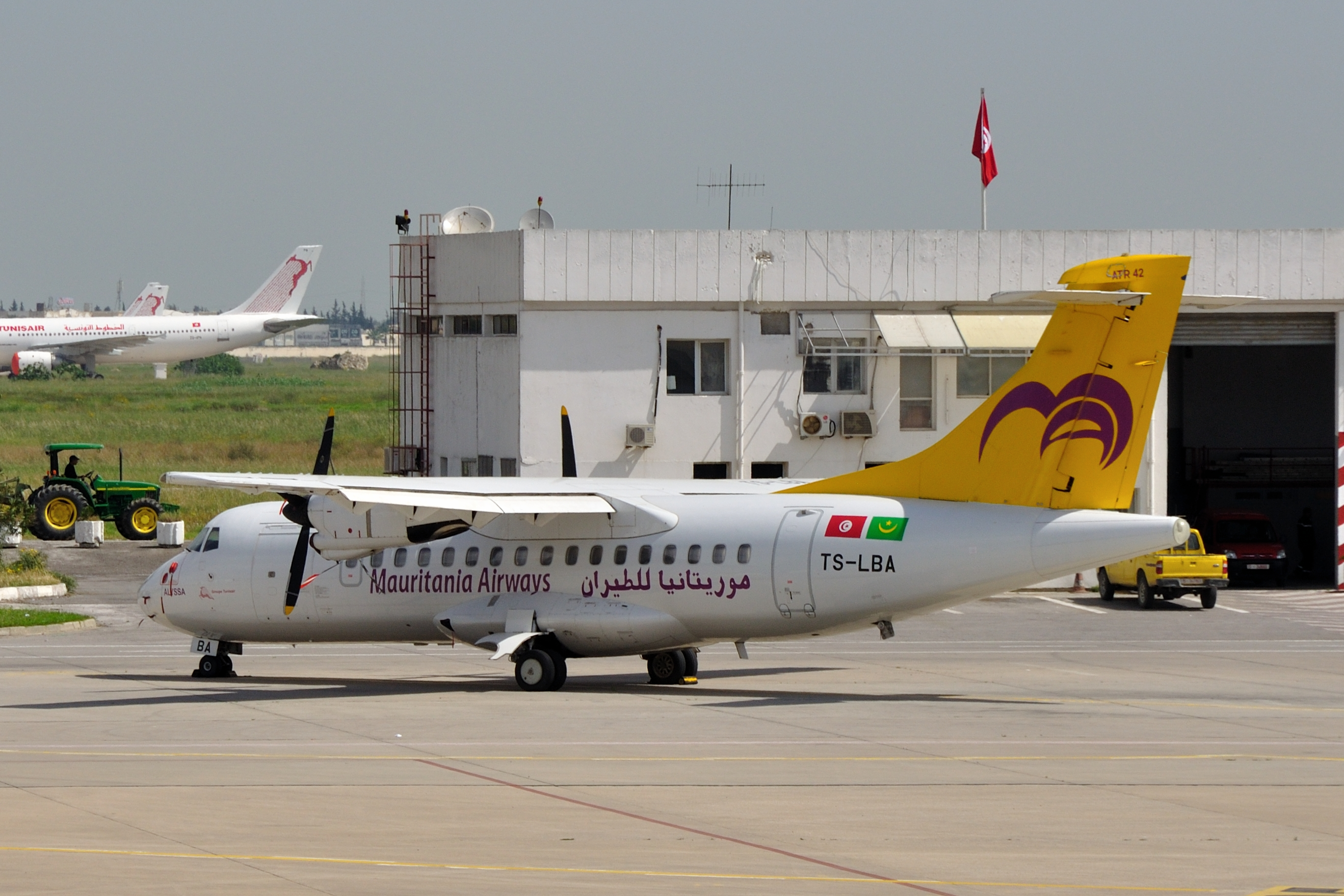
IATA	ICAO	Call sign
YD	MTW	MAURITANIA AIRWAYS
- Founded: 2006
- Commenced operations: November 2007
- Ceased operations: December 2010
- Hubs: Nouakchott International Airport
- Fleet size: 3 (upon closure)
- Destinations: 12
- Parent company: Tunisair
- Headquarters: Nouakchott, Mauritania
- Website: fly-mauritaniaairways.com (defunct)

Mauritania Airways S.A. was an airline based in Nouakchott, Mauritania, operating out of Nouakchott International Airport.

== History ==
The company was established in December 2006, and made its first flight on 7 November 2007. It replaced Air Mauritanie, the former national airline, which had suffered from prolonged financial difficulties and had been liquidated in October of the same year.

Mauritania Airways was a joint venture between Mauritanian and Tunisian interests: Tunisair owned 51 percent, Mauritanian businessman Mohamed Ould Bouamatou owned 39 percent, and the Government of Mauritania owned the remaining 10 percent.

In November 2010, the airline was banned from European airspace by the European Commission, quoting "persisting deficiencies in its operations and maintenance", thus losing the rights to continue its scheduled services to Paris-Orly Airport, France and Gran Canaria Airport, Spain. Subsequently, Mauritania Airways discontinued all flights and went out of service on 23 December 2010.

Again, a new Mauritanian flag carrier was formed, this time called Mauritania Airlines International; this airline was subsequently announced in the April 2012 European Commission press release (19th update) as having been added to the European list of banned air carriers.

== Destinations ==
As of January 2010, Mauritania Airways offered scheduled flights to the following destinations:

Africa

- Benin
  - Cotonou – Cadjehoun Airport
- Cape Verde
  - Praia – Praia Airport
- Côte d'Ivoire
  - Abidjan – Port Bouet Airport
- The Gambia
  - Banjul – Banjul International Airport
- Mali
  - Bamako – Senou International Airport
- Mauritania
  - Nouakchott – Nouakchott International Airport hub
  - Nouadhibou – Nouadhibou International Airport
- Niger
  - Niamey – Niamey Airport
- Republic of the Congo
  - Brazzaville – Maya-Maya Airport
- Senegal
  - Dakar – Dakar-Yoff-Léopold Sédar Senghor International Airport
  - Ziguinchor – Ziguinchor Airport
- Tunisia
  - Tunis – Tunis-Carthage International Airport

Europe (flights were all suspended following the EU ban)

- France
  - Paris – Paris-Orly Airport
- Spain
  - Las Palmas – Gran Canaria Airport

== Fleet ==
Upon its closure in December 2010, the Mauritania Airways fleet consisted of the following aircraft:

Fleet
Aircraft	Total	Passengers (Business/Economy)	Notes
ATR 42-300	1	48 (0/0/48)	
Boeing 737-700	2	145 (0/12/133)	leased from Tunisair
Total	3		

== Incidents ==
On 28 July 2010 at 01:30 local time, Mauritania Airways Flight 620 from Dakar, Senegal to Conakry, Guinea, which was operated using a Boeing 737-700 (registered TS-IEA), overran the runway upon landing in heavy rain at Conakry International Airport. Approximately 10 persons amongst the 91 passengers and six crew members on board suffered injuries, but there were no fatalities, even though the aircraft was substantially damaged and declared a hull loss; the first of a Boeing 737-700.
