= Zeidane Ould Hmeida =

Mauritanian politician (born 1955)

Zeidane Ould Hmeida (born in 1955) is a Mauritanian politician and former Minister of Oil and Energy.

He was appointed Minister of Industry and Mines on November 4, 2001, by President Maaouya Ould Sid'Ahmed Taya. On March 29, 2005, he was appointed Minister of Oil and Energy, a new portfolio. Following Taya's fall from power in August 2005, Ould Hmeida lost his ministerial position and was arrested for alleged 'economic crimes'.

Since May 13, 2014, he has served as a presidential Advisor, under both Mohamed Ould Abdel Aziz and current head of state Mohamed Ould Ghazouani.

He retired in 2020.
