= Tazadit Airport =

Tazadit Airport مطار ازويرات (Arabic)
- IATA: OUZ; ICAO: GQPZ

Summary
- Airport type: Public
- Serves: Zouérat
- Elevation AMSL: 1,119 ft (341 m)
- Coordinates: 22°45′25″N 12°29′00″W

Map
- Location of the airport in Mauritania

Runways
Direction	Length		Surface
Direction	m	ft	Surface
09/27	2,500	8,202	Asphalt
- Source: GCM Google Maps

Tazadit Airport (IATA: OUZ, ICAO: GQPZ) is an airport that serves the city of Zouérat in Mauritania.

== Airlines and destinations ==
Airlines	Destinations
Mauritania Airlines	Nouadhibou

== See also ==
- Transport in Mauritania
- List of airports in Mauritania
