= Mauritania Airlines =

Flag carrier of Mauritania

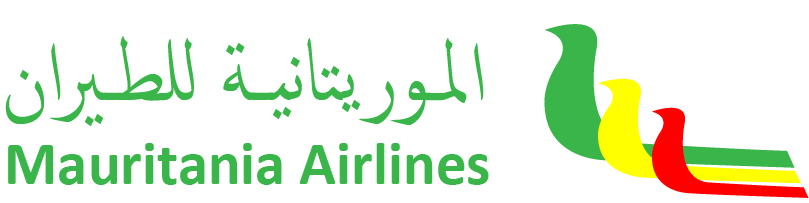

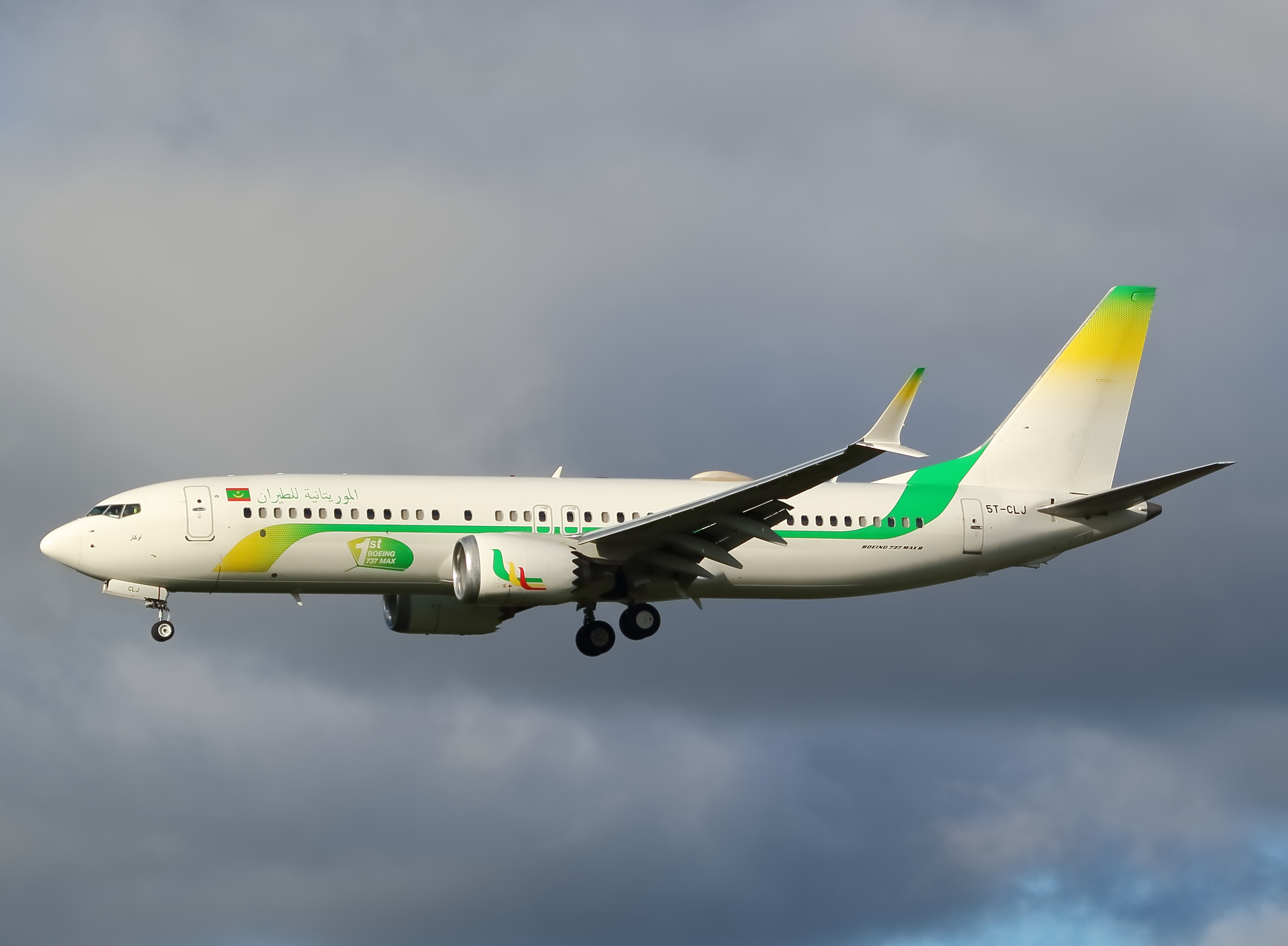
IATA	ICAO	Call sign
L6	MAI	MAURITANIA AIRLINES
- Founded: December 2010; 15 years ago
- Hubs: Nouakchott–Oumtounsy International Airport
- Fleet size: 6
- Destinations: 15
- Headquarters: Nouakchott, Mauritania
- Website: mauritaniaairlines.mr

Mauritania Airlines, previously Mauritania Airlines International, is an airline based in Nouakchott, Mauritania, serving as flag carrier of the country. The company was set up in December 2010 in response to the demise of Mauritania Airways. In April 2018, the airline rebranded from Mauritania Airlines International to Mauritania Airlines. It is the only airline currently flying domestically within Mauritania.

== Destinations ==
Mauritania Airlines has its base at Nouakchott–Oumtounsy International Airport (NKC). The company operates short- and medium-haul flights.

The airline was on the EU "blacklist" until December 2012, but it has since been removed.

Country	City	Airport	Notes	Refs
Benin	Cotonou	Cadjehoun Airport		
Côte d'Ivoire	Abidjan	Félix-Houphouët-Boigny International Airport		
Gabon	Libreville	Léon-Mba International Airport		
Guinea	Conakry	Ahmed Sékou Touré International Airport		
Mali	Bamako	Modibo Keita International Airport		
Mauritania	Néma	Néma Airport		
Mauritania	Nouadhibou	Nouadhibou International Airport		
Mauritania	Nouakchott	Nouakchott–Oumtounsy International Airport	Hub	
Mauritania	Zouérat	Tazadit Airport		
Morocco	Casablanca	Mohammed V International Airport		
Republic of the Congo	Brazzaville	Maya-Maya Airport		
Republic of the Congo	Pointe-Noire	Agostinho-Neto International Airport		
Senegal	Dakar	Blaise Diagne International Airport		
Sierra Leone	Freetown	Freetown International Airport		
Spain	Las Palmas	Gran Canaria Airport		
Tunisia	Tunis	Tunis–Carthage International Airport		

=== Codeshare and Interline agreements ===
Mauritania Airlines currently has a codeshare agreement with Royal Air Maroc and Interline agreements with APG Airlines and Hahn Air.

== Fleet ==
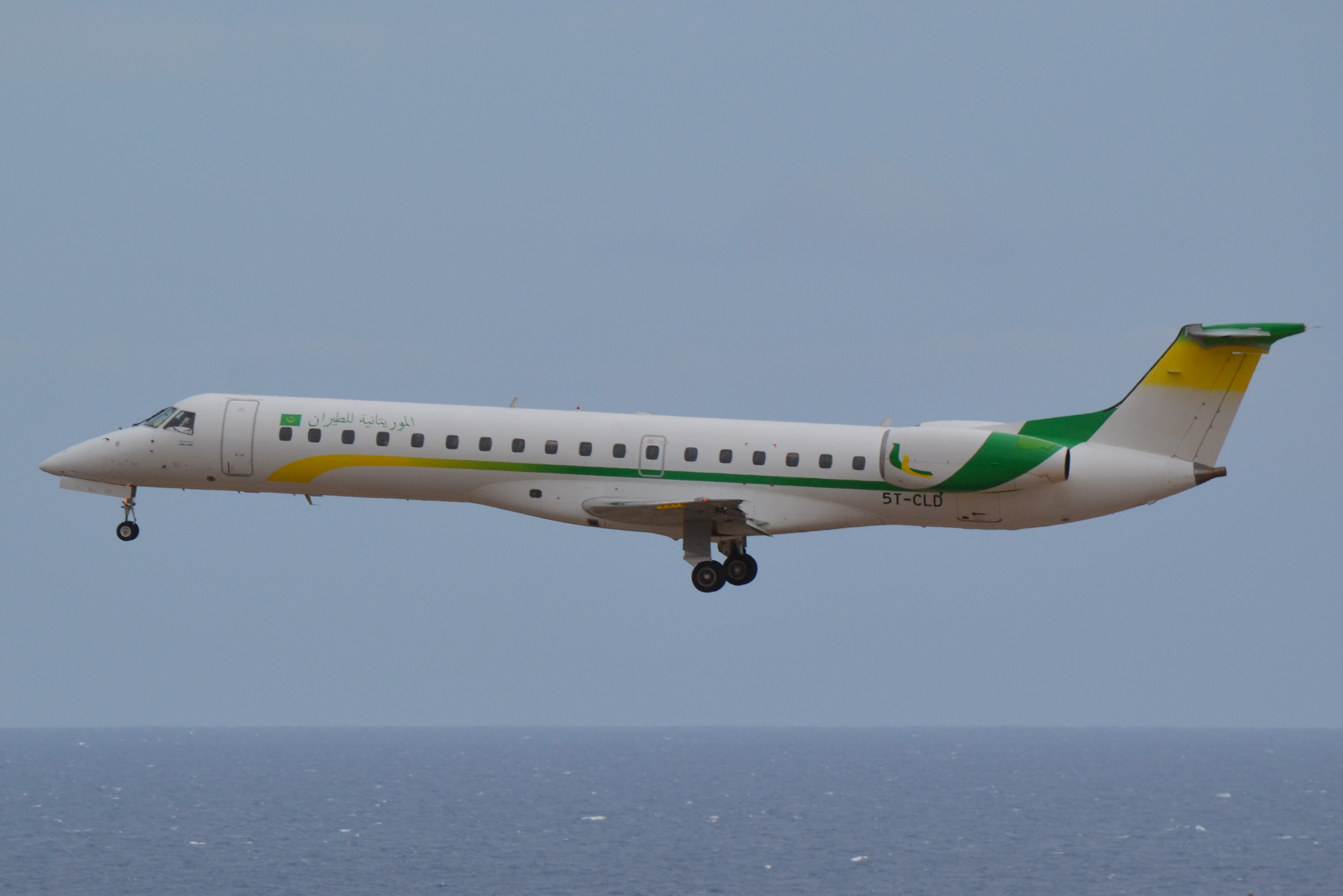
A Mauritania Airlines Embraer ERJ-145LR

=== Current fleet ===
As of July 2026, Mauritania Airlines operates the following aircraft:

Mauritania Airlines fleet
Aircraft	In service	Orders	Passengers			Notes
Aircraft	In service	Orders	B	E	Total	Notes
Boeing 737-700	1	—			115	
Boeing 737-800	1	—	16	144	160	
Boeing 737 MAX 8	1	—	16	144	160	
Embraer ERJ 145	1	—	—	50	50	
Embraer 175	2	—	TBA		76	
Total	6	0				

=== Former fleet ===
As of August 2025, Mauritania Airlines operated 1 Boeing 737-700, 1 Boeing 737-800, 1 Boeing 737-8 MAX, 1 Embraer ERJ 145 and 2 Embraer 175.

The airline also previously operated the following aircraft:

- 1 leased Airbus A320
- 2 Boeing 737-500

== See also ==
- List of defunct airlines of Mauritania
