= Khatt Atui =

Wadi in Western Sahara and Mauritania

Khatt Atui Khatt Atoui, Wad Atui, Uad Atui, Oued Atui, Oued Atwiy
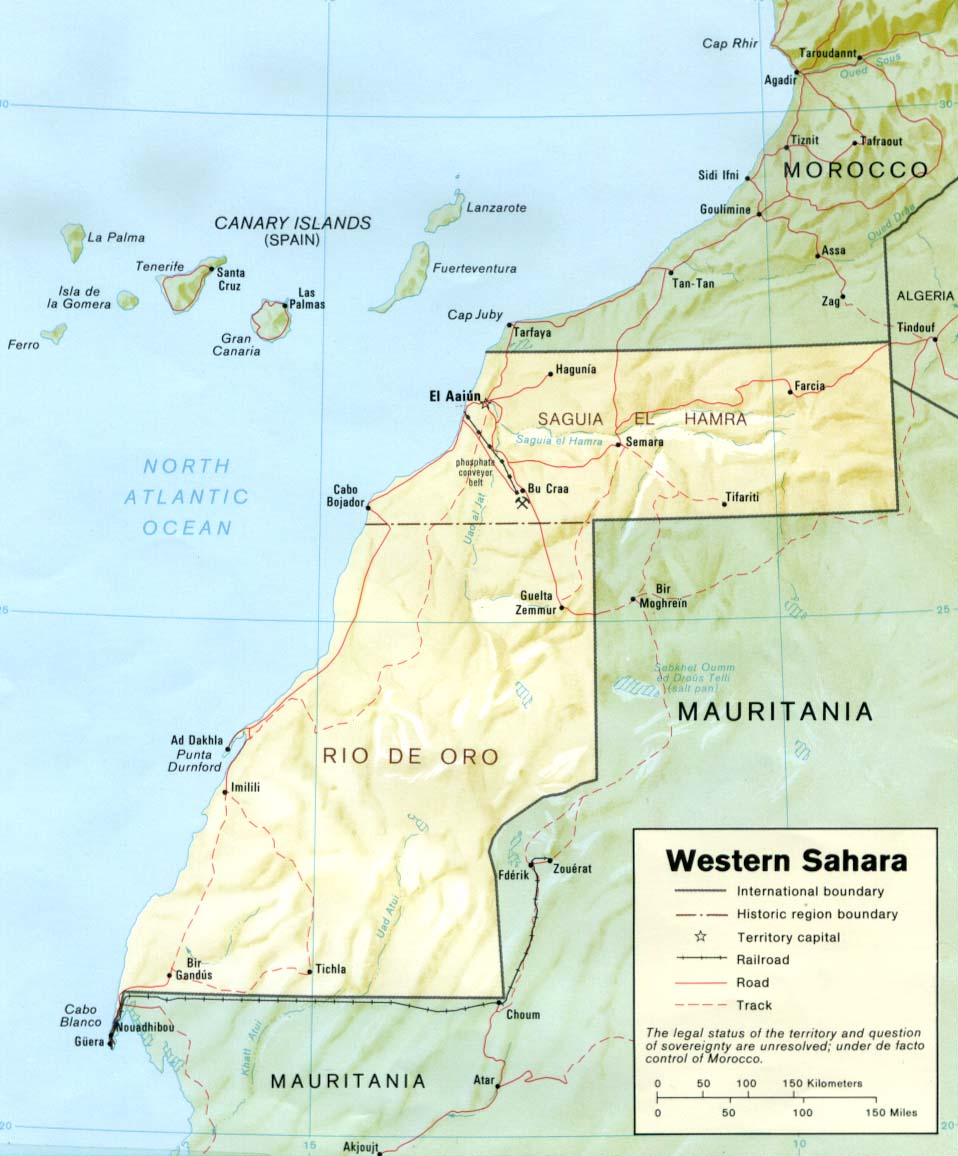
- 1989 map of Western Sahara showing the course of Khatt Atui (Uad Atui)

Location
- Countries: Mauritania, Western Sahara
- Regions: Dakhlet Nouadhibou, Inchiri (Mauritania)

Physical characteristics
- Source: northeast of Aousserd, Western Sahara
  - coordinates: 22°47′N 14°07′W
- Mouth: Baie d'Aouati, Atlantic Ocean
  - coordinates: 19°53′N 16°15′W
- Basin size: 83,295 km^{2} (32,160 sq mi)

Basin features
- Population: 99,599

Khatt Atui is a wadi in North Africa. This dry riverbed begins near Aousserd in the disputed territory of Western Sahara and runs southwest through the Dakhlet Nouadhibou and Inchiri Regions of Mauritania, ending at the Baie d'Aouati on the Atlantic coast east of Iouik, Mauritania in Banc d'Arguin National Park.

The Atui basin as defined by the Transboundary Waters Assessment Programme of the Global Environment Facility covers 83,295 square kilometres (32,160 sq mi) and is home to an estimated 99,599 people. The Mauritanian settlements of Chami (on the highway between Nouakchott and Nouadhibou), Imkebden and N'Talfa are located along the wadi, as is the Tasiast gold mine.

Khatt Atui has been suggested as the location of the lower reaches of a major ancient river, dubbed the Tamanrasett paleoriver, that flowed through the Sahara to the Arguin Basin during humid episodes in the late Quaternary. Early Neolithic archaeological sites have been found along the Mauritanian portion of the wadi.
