= Vehicle registration plates of Mauritania =

Mauritania
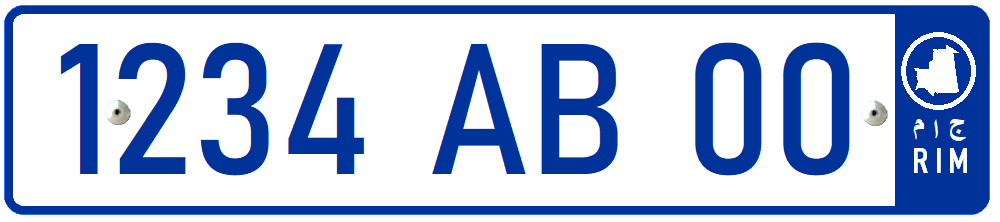
- Regular legal standard number plate from Nouakchott.
- Country: Mauritania
- Country code: RIM

Current series
- Size: 520 mm × 110 mm 20.5 in × 4.3 in
- Serial format: Not standard
- Colour (front): Blue on White
- Colour (rear): Blue on White

The license plates of Mauritania feature a white background with a blue label. The plates start with four digits, followed by two letters and end with a two-digit number. This combination provides information about the specific area where the vehicle is registered (e.g., "00" for Nouakchott). On the right side of the plate, there is a representation of Mauritanian license plates based on the Euro plate design. This includes a blue bar displaying a circular outline of the country and the distinctive "RIM" abbreviation (French: République Islamique de Mauritanie - Islamic Republic of Mauritania) in both Arabic and Latin letters. In older license plates, the blue bar is not present, and only the letters are displayed.

As stated before, the international vehicle registration code for Mauritania is RIM.

In 2017 it became optional to use Arabic letters instead of Latin letters, with the plate format flipped to reflect Arabic reading order, with an official list of letter pairs published in 2023.

Arabic letters	Mapped Latin letters	Phonetic Transliteration
أ أ	AA	aa
أ ب	AB	ab
أ ج	AC	aj
أ ع	AE	aʿ
أ ث	AF	ath
أ ق	AG	aq
أ ك	AK	ak
أ ل	AL	al
أ م	AM	am
أ ن	AN	an
أ ط	AP	at
أ ر	AR	ar
أ س	AS	as
أ و	AU	aw
أ ى	AV	aa
أ ي	AY	ay
أ ض	AZ	aḍ

== Regional coding ==
- 00 - Nouakchott
- 01 - Hodh Ech Chargui
- 02 - Hodh El Gharbi
- 03 - Assaba
- 04 - Gorgol
- 05 - Brakna
- 06 - Trarza
- 07 - Adrar
- 08 - Dakhlet Nouadhibou
- 09 - Tagant
- 10 - Guidimaga
- 11 - Tiris Zemmour
- 12 - Inchiri
License plates of Mauretania
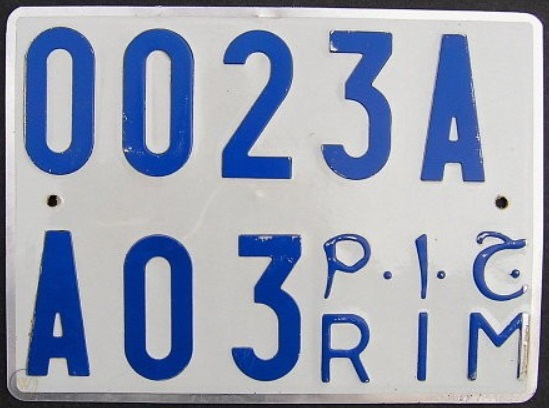
Older type.

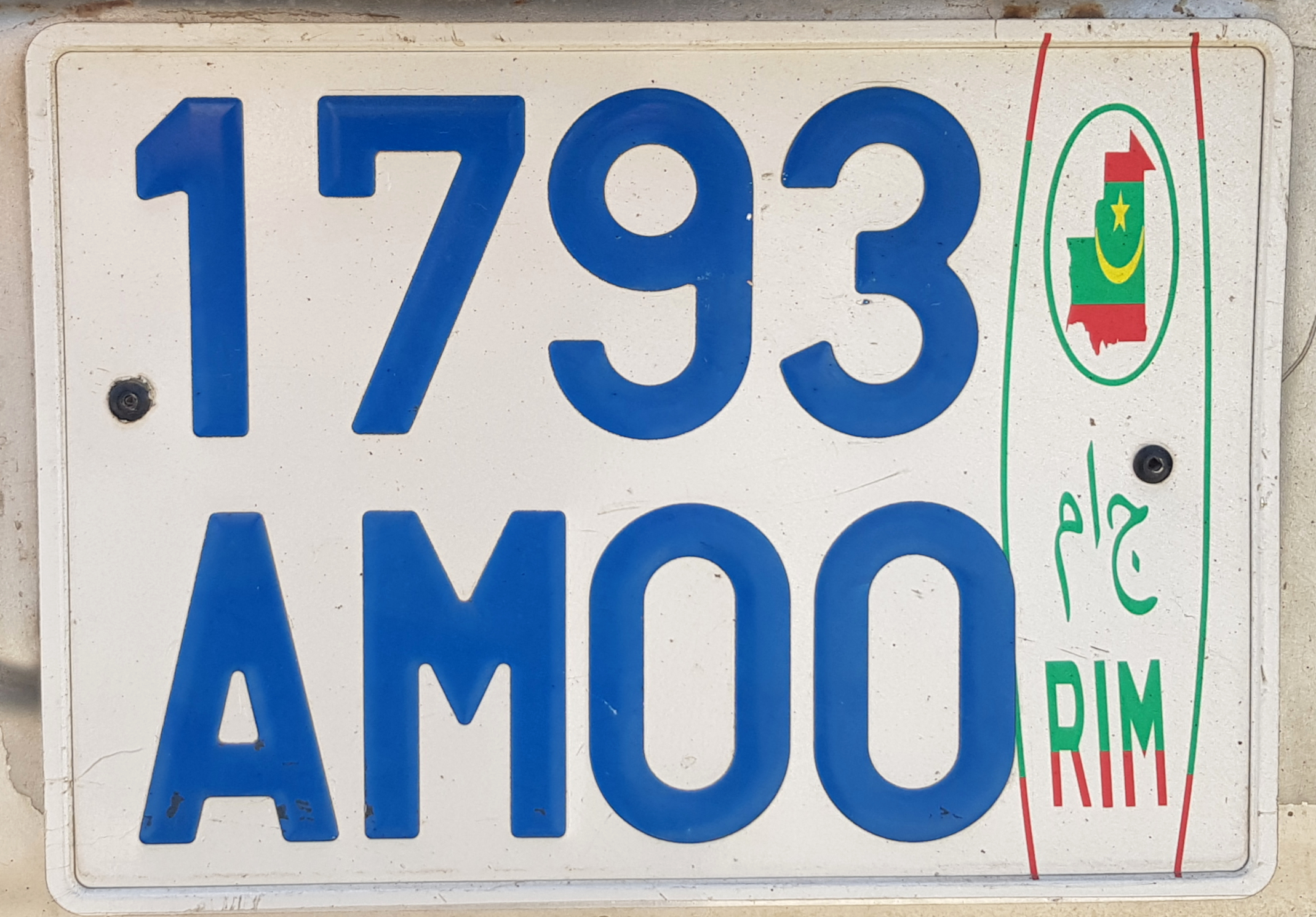
Civilian plate with coloured map.

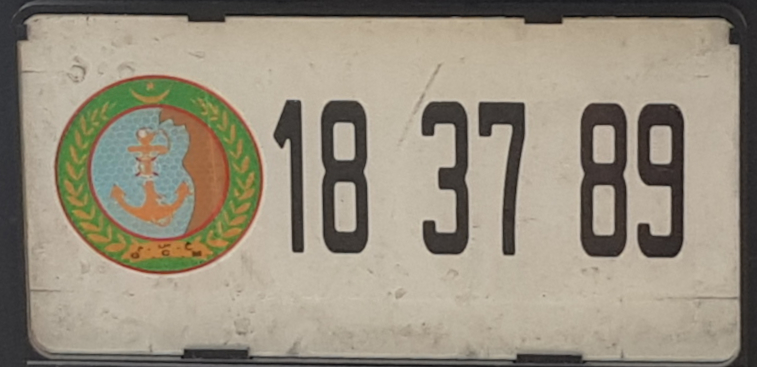
Navy vehicle.

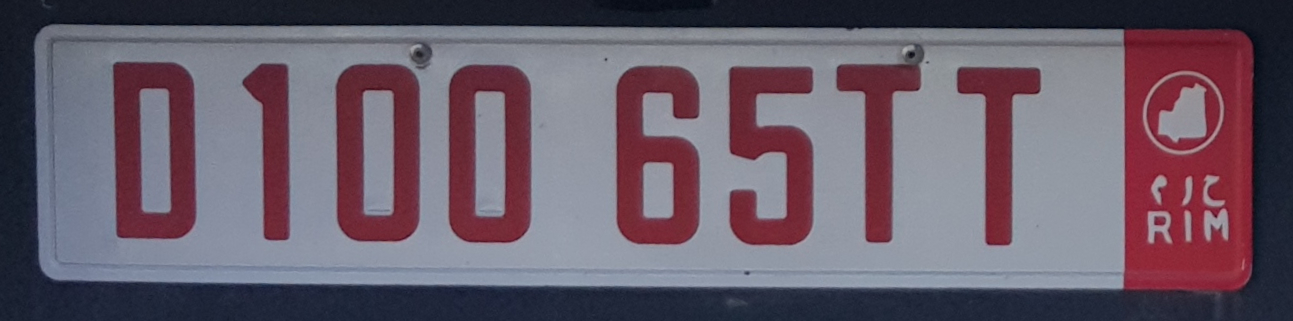
Temporary license plate.
