= Tikattane =

- Location in Mauritania
- Coordinates: 19°2′N 16°14′W
- Country: Mauritania
- Region: Inchiri

Tikattane is a coastal town in western Mauritania. It is located in Akjoujt department in the Inchiri Region.

Nearby towns and villages include El Mamghar (25.6 nm), Regbet Thila (26.5 nm), Iouik (50.1 nm), Akjoujt (113.2 nm), Portendick (27.8 nm) and Tanit (27.1 nm).
