= Kiji =

Kiji may refer to:

- KIJI, a radio station in Guam
- Kijji, an island in Mauritania
- Aba Kiji, a clan of the Shor people of Russia
- Japanese torpedo boat Kiji, two Japanese warships

== See also ==
- Kijiji, an online classified advertising service
