= Cape Timiris =

Coordinates: 19°23′04″N 16°32′38″W

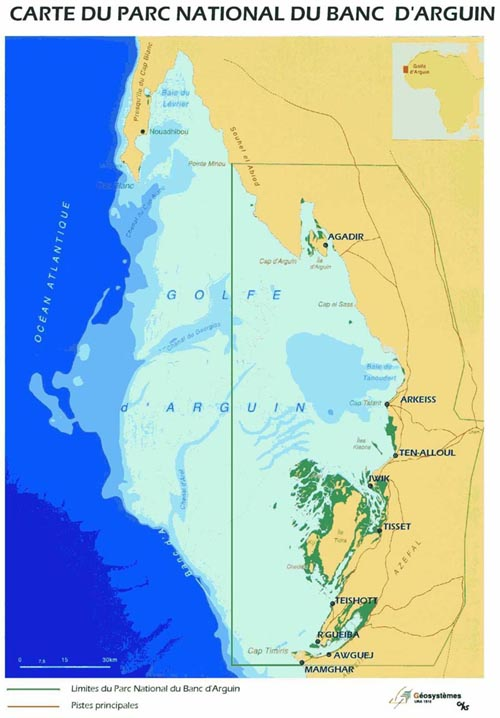
Map of the Banc d'Arguin National Park coast of Mauritania, with Cape Timiris in the far south.

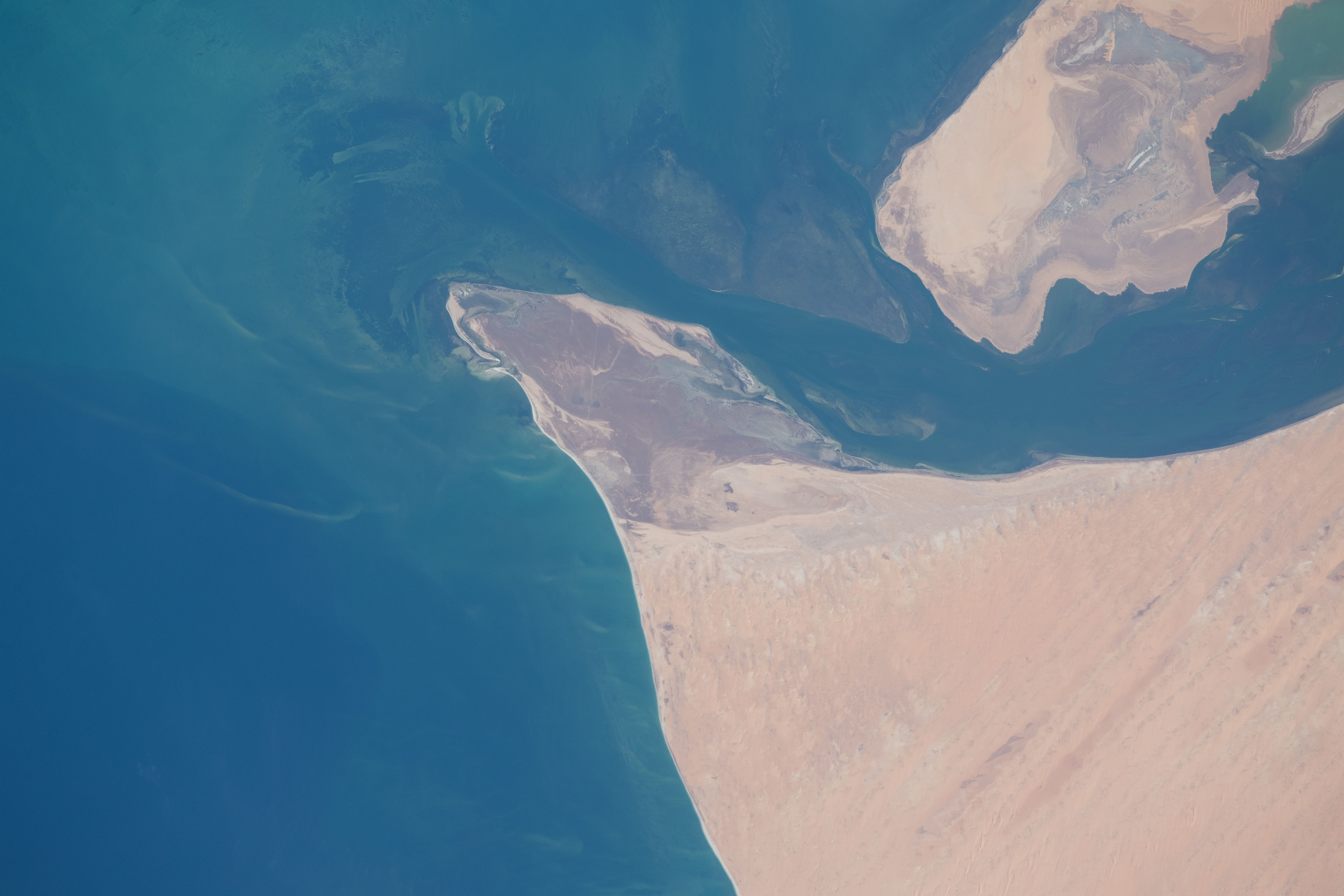
Cape Timiris

Cape Timiris (Cap Timiris in French), or Râs Timirist, is a headland on the Atlantic Ocean coast of Mauritania, roughly 160 kilometres (99 mi) north by air from Nouakchott, south of Tidra Island, near the settlement of Nouamghar (El Mamghar). It lies at the southern edge of the Banc d'Arguin National Park, an Important Bird Area. The lagoons of the cape provide shallow waters for birds, particularly waders. The cape contains a nearby observatory.

== Geography ==
Cape Timiris is a headland on the Atlantic Ocean coast of Mauritania, roughly 157 kilometres (98 mi) north by air from Nouakchott, south of Tidra Island, and roughly 32 miles (51 km) south of Cape Juick. The cape marks the southern boundary of the Banc d'Arguin National Park, an internationally designated Important Bird Area. The settlement of Nouâmghâr, located at the entrance to the cape, to the south, serves as one of the access points to the park. There is a headland and an island, Île de Hossam, at Cape Timiris.

The central ridge of the area consists of numerous small sand dunes. Sand hills lie between the cape and the dune of Piton de Chedallah, 33 miles (53 km) to the southeast. Lagoons to the west and north of the cape provide shallow waters where birds, particularly waders, can forage, and the vicinity is rich in mangroves. The Baie de Saint Jean lies between the cape and Presqui'ile de Thila, 4 miles (6.4 km) to the northeast. The Imraguen people fish in the area.

The Cap Timiris Canyon lies off the coast, which is on the northern boundary of the Mesozoic–Cenozoic Senegal Mauritania Basin.

== Observatory ==
There is an observatory situated at Cape Timiris.
