= Nemadi dialect =

Dialect of Hassaniya Arabic

Nemadi
- Ikoku
- Native to: Mali, Mauritania
- Region: Timbuktu (Mali), Mauritania
- Native speakers: (200 cited 1967)
- Language family: Afro-Asiatic: Semitic; West Semitic; Central Semitic; Arabic; Maghrebi; Hilalian; Hassaniya; Nemadi

Language codes
- ISO 639-3: –
- Glottolog: None

Nemadi is a language spoken by a small hunting tribe of eastern Mauritania known as the Nemadi people. It is, according to some sources, a dialect of Hassaniyya, according to others, a mixture of Zenaga, Azer, and Hassaniyya. The name "Nemadi" itself appears to come from Soninke, where it means "master of dogs".

== Documentation ==
According to Robert Arnaud (1906), "around Tichit the Nemadi employ a dialect called Azeïr which is close to Soninke." Chudeau (1913), perhaps following him, adds that "We have little information on their language, which M. Delafosse classifies provisionally with Soninké." However, Brosset (1932) says that they speak Hassaniyya, and that "their special vocabulary does not consist of vocables different from Hassaniyya, but of technical terms which need has forced them to create, which are forged from Arabic, Zenaga, and maybe Azer."

Chinguetti's Kitab El Wasit says that "The Nmadi speak the dialect common to all the Moors (i.e. Hassaniyya). However, they do not pronounce the final m of the affixed second person plural pronoun, so they say: as-Salam alayku ("peace be upon you") for alaikum, and kayfa haluku ("how are you?") for halukum."

Laforgue claims that they speak "Zenati", i.e. Berber, a claim seen by Hermans as "very improbable".

According to Gerteiny (1967), they speak "their own dialect, probably a mixture of Azêr [Soninke], Zenaga, and Hassaniyya, called Ikôku by the Moors. They express themselves in brief idiomatic phrases, and the language has neither singular nor plural."

The Ethnologue's former description of their language appears to be based solely on this source. Later editions say that "The Nemadi (Ikoku) are an ethnic group of 200 (1967) that speak Hassaniyya, but they have special morphemes for dogs, hunting, and houses".

Hermans' opinion is that "the language spoken by the Nemadi in general (there may remain some Azer-speaking Nemadi) is Hassaniyya. But one must recognize certain peculiarities", including the lack of plural, certain argot-like expressions (cf. Fondacci), and the technical terms (cf. Brosset, Fondacci, Gabus.)

== In literature ==
The Nemadi feature in a side story in Bruce Chatwin's semi-fictional book The Songlines about Aboriginal Australians.

== See also ==
- Imraguen people

== Bibliography ==
- Robert Arnaud, 1906. "Chasseurs et pêcheurs du Tagant et du Hodh", in La Géographie, vol. 16.
- Capt. Diégo Brosset 1932, "Les Némadi", in Bulletin de l'Afrique de l'Ouest Française.
- Sid Ahmad Lamine ech-Chinguetti 1911. Kitab al-Wasît. Cairo.
- Raymond Chudeau 1913. "Peuples du sahara central et occidental", in l’Anthropologie.
- Capt. P. H. Fondacci 1945. "Les Némadis" (Mémoire du CHEAM n° 1009).
- Jean Gabus 1951. "Contribution à l’étude des Némadis", in Bull. Soc. Suisse d’ Anthropologie-Neuchâtel.
- Alfred G. Gerteiny 1967, Mauritania. Frederic A. Praeger.
- Jean-Michel Hermans, Les NEMADIS, chasseurs-cueilleurs du désert mauritanien
- Pierre Laforgue 1926. "Une fraction non musulmane : les Némadi", in Bulletin de l'Afrique de l'Ouest Française.
