= Nouamghar =

- Commune and village
- Location in Mauritania
- Coordinates: 19°21′30″N 16°30′46″W
- Country: Mauritania
- Region: Dakhlet Nouadhibou
- Department: Chami

Area
  - Total: 3,050 sq mi (7,899 km^{2})

Population (2023)
  - Total: 1,553
  - Density: 0.5092/sq mi (0.1966/km^{2})
- Time zone: UTC+0 (GMT)

Nouamghar (or Nouâmghâr), also El Mamghar, is a coastal village and rural commune in the Dakhlet Nouadhibou region of western Mauritania. The village is 150 kilometers north north-east of the capital Nouakchott and is located at the entrance to Cape Timiris. It is a traditional and active fishing port where ancient fishing techniques are used.

== History ==
Historically a fishing village, Nouamghar sits a few meters away from the shore on a coastal dune, and is located southeast of Cape Timiris. Inhabited by Imraguen fishermen, whose huts were covered with cotton, the village was the center of "a considerable trade of dried fish." The fishermen dried their fish under the sun, which were then transported to Adrar in caravans.

The village has changed since the Banc d'Arguin National Park was declared a World Heritage Site, as it is now the administrative center of the park authority and one of the focal access points to the park.

== Population ==
At the 2023 census, Nouamghar had 1,553 inhabitants.
