= List of rivers of Mauritania =

This is a list of rivers in Mauritania. This list is arranged by drainage basin, with respective tributaries indented under each larger stream's name.

== Atlantic Ocean ==
- Khatt Atui
- Oued Seguellil
- Sénégal River
  - Gorgol River
    - Gorgol Noir (Gorgol el Akhdar)
    - Gorgol Blanc (Gorgol el Abiod)
  - Oued Garfa
  - Karakoro River
  - Kolinbiné River
