= Tmeimichatt =

Coordinates: 17°14′44″N 10°40′11″W

- Commune and village
- Location in Mauritania
- Country: Mauritania
- Region: Dakhlet Nouadhibou
- Department: Chami

Area
  - Total: 3,722 sq mi (9,641 km^{2})

Population (2023 census)
  - Total: 1,615
  - Density: 0.4339/sq mi (0.1675/km^{2})
- Time zone: UTC+0 (GMT)

Tmeimichatt is a village and rural commune in Mauritania.
