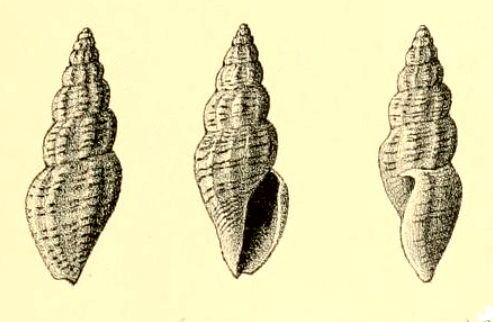
- Original image of a shell of Mangelia pontyi

Scientific classification
- Kingdom: Animalia
- Phylum: Mollusca
- Class: Gastropoda
- Subclass: Caenogastropoda
- Order: Neogastropoda
- Family: Mangeliidae
- Genus: Mangelia
- Species: M. pontyi

Binomial name
- Mangelia pontyi (Dautzenberg, 1910)

Synonyms
- Mangilia pontyi Dautzenberg, 1910

= Mangelia pontyi =

Species of gastropod

Mangelia pontyi is a species of sea snail, a marine gastropod mollusk in the family Mangeliidae.

== Description ==
The length of the shell attains 7 mm, its diameter 2.5 mm.

== Distribution ==
This marine species occurs off Cansado, Mauritania.
