= La Batterie =

La Batterie Al Batariyya
- Location in Mauritania
- Coordinates: 20°51′34″N 17°2′16″W
- Country: Mauritania
- Region: Dakhlet Nouadhibou

La Batterie, also known in Arabic as Al Batariyya, is a village in northwestern Mauritania on the Ras Nouadhibou peninsular. It is located in the Nouadhibou Department in the Dakhlet Nouadhibou region south of Nouadhibou close to Cansado.
