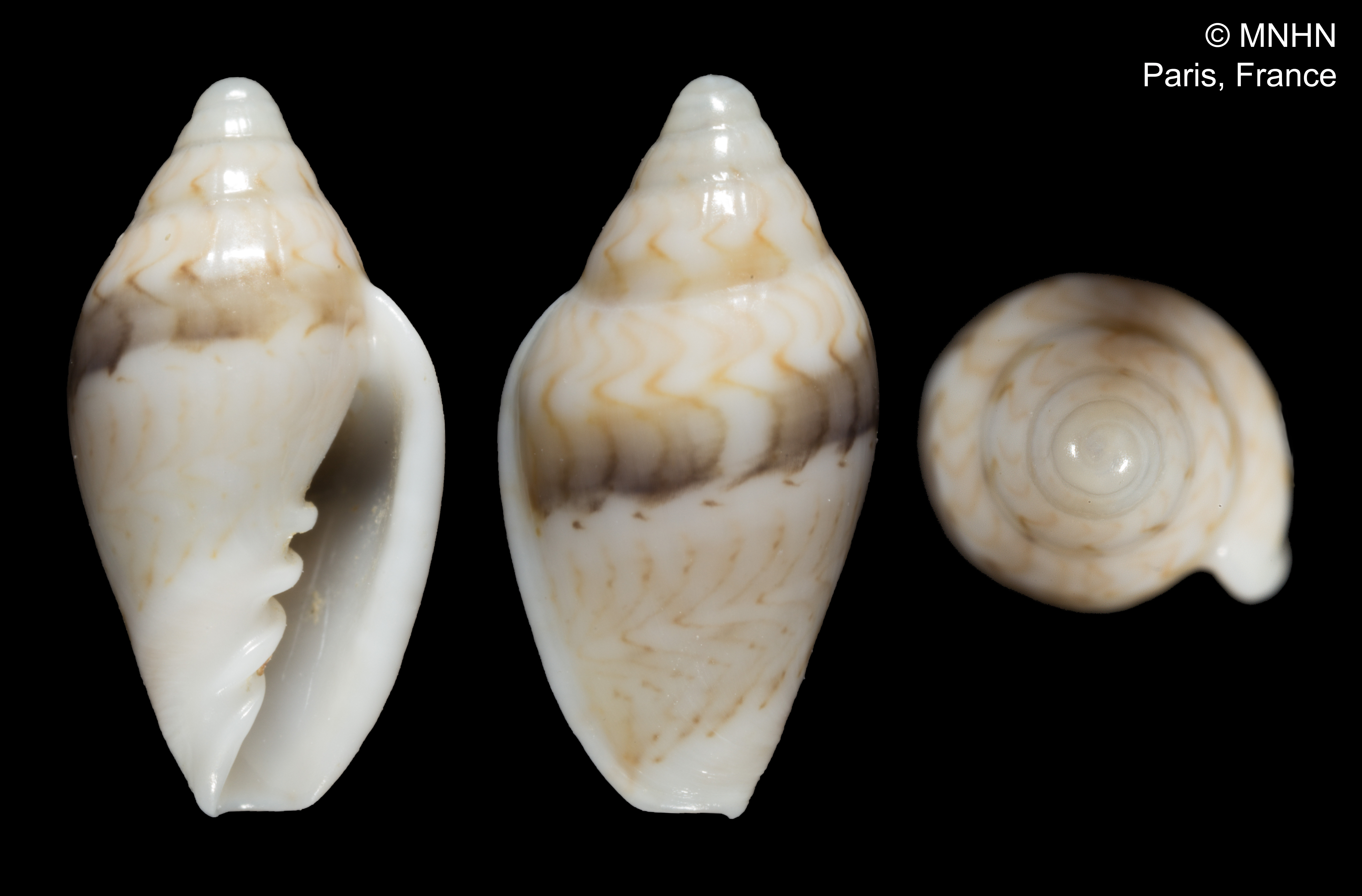
- Shell of Marginella bavayi (syntype at MNHN, Paris)

Scientific classification
- Kingdom: Animalia
- Phylum: Mollusca
- Class: Gastropoda
- Subclass: Caenogastropoda
- Order: Neogastropoda
- Family: Marginellidae
- Genus: Marginella
- Species: M. bavayi

Binomial name
- Marginella bavayi Dautzenberg, 1910

Synonyms
- Marginella (Mordicamarginella) bavayi Dautzenberg, 1910· accepted, alternate representation

= Marginella bavayi =

Species of gastropod

Marginella bavayi is a species of sea snail, a marine gastropod mollusk in the family Marginellidae, the margin snails.

== Description ==
The shell is ovate-conical, smooth, and very glossy, with a conical spire ending in an obtuse apex. It has about 4½ slightly convex whorls separated by a distinct suture, with an elongated body whorl tapering toward the base. The aperture is moderately open, and the columella bears four folds, while the outer lip is slightly arched, smooth internally, and narrowly bordered externally. The protoconch is bulbous and protruding, and the outer lip is thin, regular, and smooth or very weakly denticulate.

The shell is pale fawn, with a broad grey band on the shoulder of the last whorl, three faint whitish transverse zones, and fine brown zigzag longitudinal lines. Additional spiral ornamentation includes broad cream-rufous to grey-beige bands separated by narrow whitish gaps, with two further grey-beige to amber-grey spiral bands on the spire and upper body whorl, sometimes marked with irregular blackish patches; sinuous black axial lines run along the shell but are interrupted at a whitish zone. The lip and columella base are white. It attains a length of up to 8 mm.

== Taxonomy ==
Marginella bavayi is also represented as Marginella (Mordicamarginella) bavayi. The species was described and named by Philippe Dautzenberg, who dedicated it to his colleague and friend M. A. Bavay.

More broadly, M. bayavi has been placed within a North-West African species group characterized by a slightly developed posterior notch and strongly developed labial denticles, together with M. festiva and M. cleryi, and separated from other regional assemblages (including Angolan, Namibian, and southern African lineages) based on shell morphology and coastal distribution patterns.

== Distribution ==
M. bayavi occurs off Mauritania and Senegal. It was first collected during a 1908 expedition, when specimens were dredged approximately 3½ miles north of Cansado Bay at a depth of 9–10 m. Additional specimens have since been recorded from the Nouadhibou region and the Dakar region, from shallow coastal waters to depths of about 38 m.

== Habitat ==
M. bavayi is associated with coarse sandy substrates in shallow subtidal environments.
