= Tamanrasset (disambiguation) =

Tamanrasset may refer to:

- Tamanrasset, an oasis city
- Tamanrasset River, an ancient river
- Tamanrasset Province, the largest province in Algeria
