= Iouik =

- Location in Mauritania
- Coordinates: 19°50′58″N 16°19′51″W
- Country: Mauritania
- Region: Dakhlet Nouadhibou

Iouik, also spelled Iwik, is a coastal town in western Mauritania. Located in the Banc d'Arguin National Park within the Dakhlet Nouadhibou region, it sits on a small peninsula.

Nearby towns and villages include Uad Guenifa (73.4 nm), Cansado (72.0 nm), Tanoudert (21.5 nm), Akjoujt (108.4 nm), El Mamghar (32.4 nm), Regbet Thila (28.6 nm) and Tikattane (50.1 nm) .

Iouik is very close to the island of Tidra lying in the southwest some 3 km distant, further west is Niroumi and around 10 km north are the Kiaone islands.
