= Kiaone =

Kiaone are two offshore sandy islets in the Bay of Arguin, Mauritania, the islet is very small. The large islet is 1.2 km to 300 meters long and 12 to 15 meters wide, the smaller one named Petite Kiaone is 450 meters long and 50 meters wide. The island is part of the Banc d'Arguin National Park. During low tilde the islets form a large single island. The islet is not populated.

Nearby islets includes Echakcher to the north-northeast and Niroumi to further to the southwest. Some 4 kilometres to the east is the Mauritanian mainland and nearby are the town or city of Ten-Alloul in the east, further north is the Iwik Peninsula.

Several different types of birds including the pink flamingos migrate in the area, they first migrated in 1957.

During the prehistoric era, the islets was once connected to the mainland until some 6,000 to 5,000 years ago when the rise of the sea level split it from the mainland.
