= Bafour =

Historical group in the Sahara

The Bafour or Bafur were a group of people inhabiting Mauritania and Western Sahara. Scholars such as H.T. Norris describe "Bafur (Bafour)" as a loose term encompassing the pre-Sanhaja inhabitants of the region, who were "part Berber, part Negro, and part Semite."

== History ==
Some historians believe that Bafour hunter-gatherers were the dominant population group in Mauritania during the Neolithic Era. Others propose that they were agriculturalists living in and around the Adrar Plateau, at that time the edge of the Sahara desert. The earliest European sources refer to the region as 'Adrar al Bafur', or 'Bafur Mountains'. They are credited with introducing irrigation and the cultivation of the date palm there. As Sanhaja Berber populations increasingly came to dominate the region, the Bafur mixed and traded with them.

Historian James L.A. Webb writes,

"During the more humid period from c. 1450 or 1500 to c. 1600. the lands of the central and northern Gibla came to be settled once again, this time apparently by Bafur villagers. Bafur place-names and desert traditions about the Bafur survive, but little else. The ethnic identity of the Bafur apparently was transformed in the period before the late seventeenth century and absorbed into the ethnic categories of Wolof, Berber, and Fula, and thus remains somewhat mysterious."

According to Webb's study of oral traditions, from 1600 to 1850, there was a well-established commercial route between communities of the Senegambia — reaching north to the Western Sahara and Mauritania. More than four centuries prior, Arabs mixed with Bafur and Berber Masufa in Wadan, in present-day Mauritania. A group known as Idaw al-Hajj ("sons of pilgrims" in Hassaniya) gradually settled in trading areas of northwestern Senegal, from where they dominated the gum Arabic trade, as well as shipment of grain from the Wolof region to the Bidan, and trade between Wolofs and the Maghreb for horses for their military campaigns. As is common among trading peoples, over time intermarriage had taken place between the Idaw al-Hajj people and the Wolof people, and northerners gradually became assimilated into the sub-Saharan African community, including the use of Wolof as their language.

== Identification ==
The relationship between the Bafour and any modern-day West African ethnic group is unclear. They are at times referred to as the descendants of local pre-Berber peoples. Others have argued that they were initially a non-Sanhaja Berber group that later mixed with Soninke and Fula.

French art historian Jean Laude wrote, "In the pre-Islamic period (before the ninth century), according to oral tradition, Mauritania was occupied by the Bafour, a population of possibly mixed origin from whom the eastern Songhai, the central Soninke Wangara, and the western Serer are derived." They may also be the ancestors of the coastal Imraguen community.

== Sources ==
- Pazzanita, Anthony G (2008). Historical Dictionary of Mauritania (3rd revised ed.). Scarecrow Press. ISBN 978-0-8108-5596-0.
- Webb, James L.A. (1994). Desert Frontier: Ecological and Economic Change Along the Western Sahel, 1600–1850. University of Wisconsin Press. ISBN 978-0-299-14334-3.
