= Chami, Mauritania =

Chami شامي
- Commune
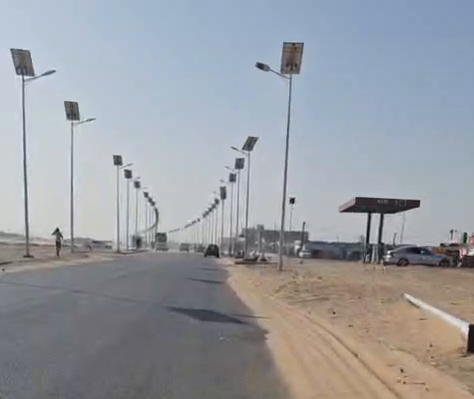
- Interactive map of Chami
- Coordinates: 20°10′2.28″N 15°58′20.64″W
- Country: Mauritania
- Region: Dakhlet Nouadhibou
- Department: Chami

Area
  - Total: 5,127 km^{2} (1,980 sq mi)

Population (2023 census)
  - Total: 4,214
  - Density: 0.8219/km^{2} (2.129/sq mi)
- Time zone: UTC+0
  - Summer (DST): not observed

Chami (Arabic: شامي) is a planned city in the Dakhlet Nouadhibou region of Mauritania. Due to the gold mining in the region, the city is known as the "capital of gold" of Mauritania. It has around 4,214 inhabitants (2023 census), of whom 2,941 were male and 1,273 were female.

== Location and climate ==
Chami is located in the northwest of the country on highway N2, which runs from Nouakchott in the south to Nouadhibou and the border with Western Sahara in the north. The distance to the Atlantic coast is about 25 km. Due to its location in the western part of the Sahara, the climate is arid. The Banc d'Arguin National Park is located directly west of Chami.

== History ==
Chami was founded in 2012 in an area that had previously been almost uninhabited in order to counter the problem of "anarchic sedentarization" – the formation of new villages through the settlement of nomads without state control. The location was chosen because of its proximity to the N2 highway, which gained in importance after it was paved. The presence of the state and the founding of a settlement were intended to improve control over the desert area and to concentrate the population, who often lived in widely scattered micro-villages, in places where it was easier to provide public services.

Even before the first families arrived, infrastructure was constructed. Plans were made for 5,680 residential lots, 805 commercial units, and community and administrative buildings on an area of 600 hectares. A green belt with nearly 50,000 plants (mainly Prosopis juliflora) was planted around the town to protect against the ever-present wind. After several public buildings were completed in 2013, a mosque was also inaugurated in 2015. There are also solar street lamps, electricity supply and a water supply network.

The 2013 census put the population at just 51, In 2015, the population was estimated to be around 3000. The population of Chami grew rapidly after President Mohamed Ould Abdel Aziz confirmed the gold rush in 2016 and said that any Mauritanian could try their luck here. There was also an influx of migrants from Mali, Sudan and other countries.

== Economy ==
Chami is a showcase project for the Mauritanian government's modernization, urban development and population control policies. In addition to the development of the town, a number of businesses have also been established there.

== Controversies ==
About 10 km south of Chami, there is a gas station at a location where the water supply would have been easier. The owner of the gas station was considered a rival of the then President Mohamed Ould Abdel Aziz, which is why it is assumed that he had the city founded at a different location, despite having a better location.

Contrary to the government's objectives, hardly any nomads from the surrounding area settled in Chami, as their income was not sufficient to buy land in Chami.

The mining activity causes severe environmental pollution, mainly due to the unregulated use of mercury. It is assumed that the prevailing northeast wind Harmattan carries mercury vapors into the Banc d'Arguin National Park, a UNESCO World Heritage Site.
