= Bay of Arguin =

Bay on the coast of Mauritania

- Baie d'Arguin (French); Baía de Arguim (Portuguese)
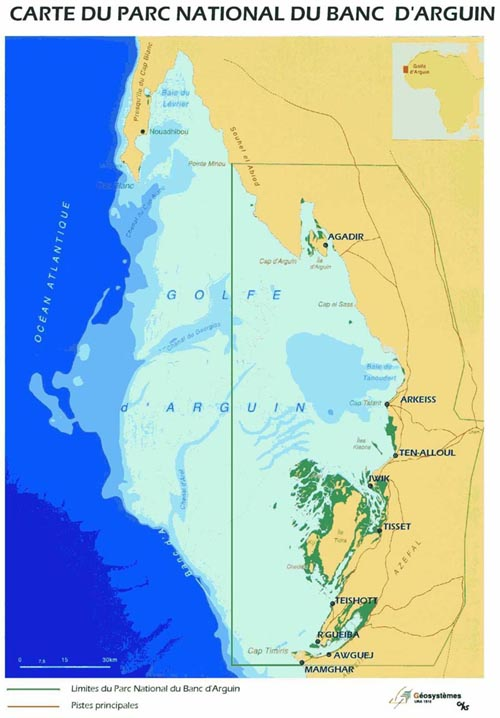
- Map of the wider gulf area showing the Banc d'Arguin National Park

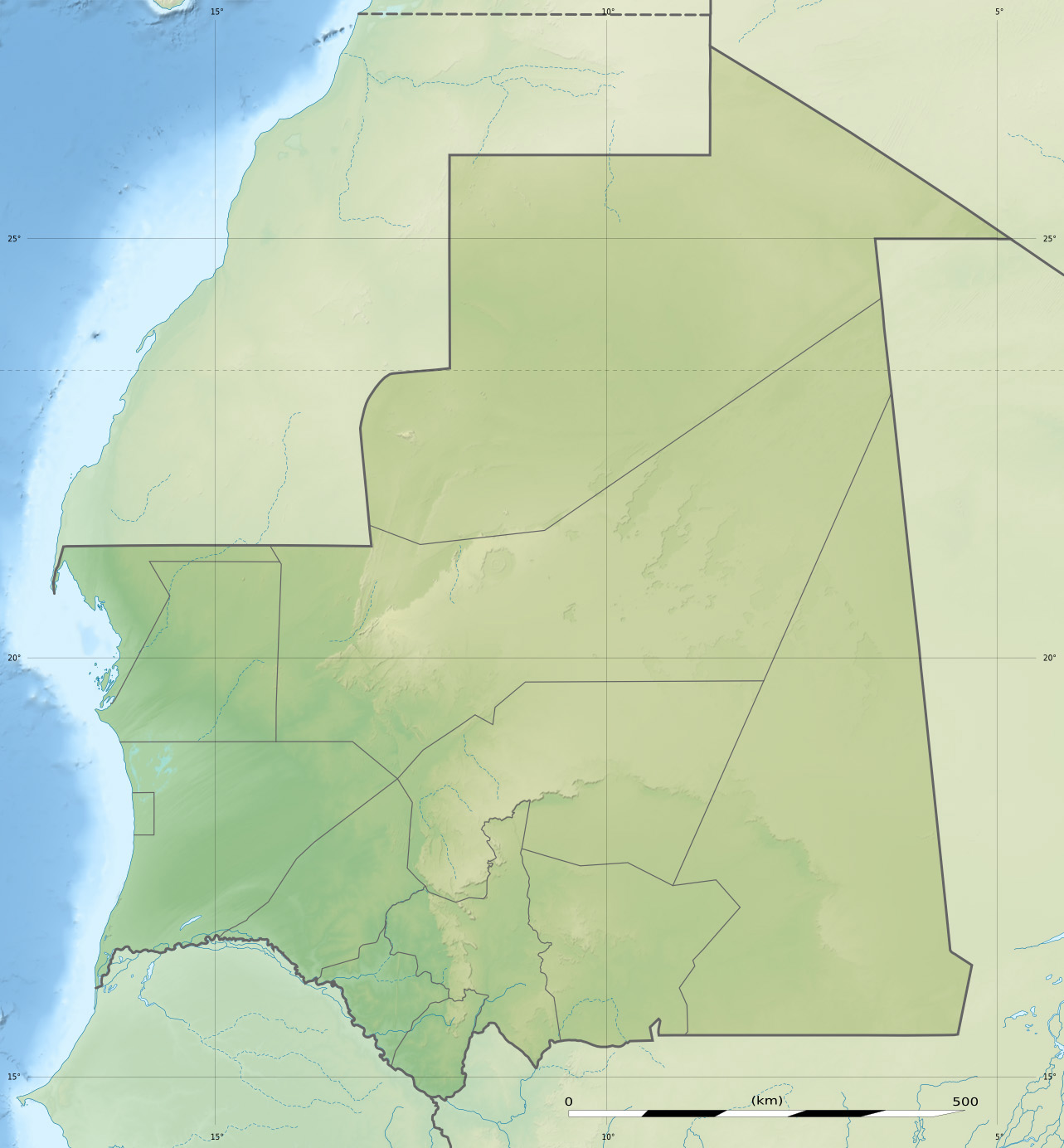
- Location in Mauritania
- Coordinates: 20.08°N 16.62°W
- Ocean/sea sources: Atlantic Ocean
- Basin countries: Mauritania
- Max. length: 13 km (8.1 mi)
- Max. width: 20 km (12 mi)
- Islands: Île d’Arguin, Île de l'Ardent

The Bay of Arguin (French: Baie d'Arguin; Portuguese: Baía de Arguim) is a bay on the Atlantic shore of Mauritania and the former mouth of the Tamanrasset River, now a Paleo-river.

== Geography ==
It is located south of Cap Blanc, north of Cap Timiris.

The bay contains three islands, including Arguin and Tidra, as well as numerous sandbanks. It is also the site of the 12,000 km^{2} Banc d'Arguin National Park which includes most of the bay. The park's northern boundary is at Minou; it does not include the Dakhlet Nouadhibou, or the westernmost areas. Smaller bays within the Bay of Arguin include Dakhlet Nouadhibou in the north and Baie de Tanoudert in the east. Other promontories include Minou, Cap Sainte-Anne, Argun, Alzaz, Tagarit and Tafarit. The Oued Chibka, a seasonal and occasional stream flowing only when the climate is partly wet, is in the north-central part.

Inhabited places by the bay include Nouadhibou in the north, Arkeiss and Tel-Alloul to the east and Teichott, R'Gueiba and Awguei to the south.

== History ==
The bay is the possible location of Cerne, a Carthaginian outpost founded by Hanno the Navigator around 500 B.C.

The first European to visit the bay was Nuno Tristão in 1443, after which the remainder of the bay was explored.

The area is also known as the place where the French frigate Méduse was famously wrecked in 1816.
