= Tanoudert =

- Location in Mauritania
- Coordinates: 20°13′N 16°13′W
- Country: Mauritania
- Region: Dakhlet Nouadhibou

Tanoudert is a coastal town in Mauritania. It is located in the Dakhlet Nouadhibou region and forms a part of the Banc d'Arguin National Park. It is situated to a homonymous bay lying to the west and further west is Cape Tagarit (Cap-Tagair).

Nearby towns and villages include Cansado (110 km), Bir Gandus, Tichla, Akjoujt and Iouik (43 km), further south is the town of Arkeiss.
