= Chami Department =

Chami
- Department
- Location within Mauritania
- Country: Mauritania
- Region: Dakhlet Nouadhibou

Area
  - Total: 8,752 sq mi (22,668 km^{2})

Population (2023 census)
  - Total: 7,382
  - Density: 0.8434/sq mi (0.3257/km^{2})

Chami is a department in Dakhlet Nouadhibou Region in Mauritania.

== List of municipalities in the department ==
The Chami department is made up of following communes:

- Chami
- Nouamghar
- Tmeimichatt

== Economy ==
Gold mining is happening in the area.
