= Dakhlet Nouadhibou region =

Region of Mauritania

Dakhlet Nouadhibou region ولاية داخلة نواذيبو
- Region of Mauritania
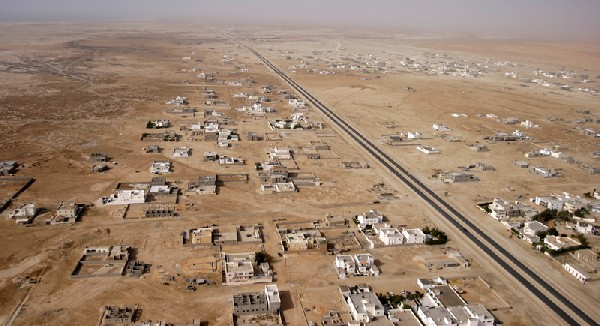

- Coordinates: 20°57′N 16°14′W
- Country: Mauritania
- Departments: 2: Nouadhibou; Chami
- Capital: Nouadhibou

Area
  - Total: 22,300 km^{2} (8,600 sq mi)

Population (2023 census)
  - Total: 184,459
  - Density: 8.27/km^{2} (21.4/sq mi)
- Time zone: UTC+0
  - Summer (DST): not observed
- HDI (2017): 0.634 medium

Dakhlet Nouadhibou region (Arabic: ولاية داخلة نواذيبو, romanized: wilāyat dāxlet nwaḏību, lit. 'Nouadhibou Peninsula Region') is an administrative division of Mauritania. Its regional capital is Nouadhibou, located at its northwestern end and serving nearly 95% of the region's population. The rest of the shoreline is sparsely populated with villages, but the east of the region is mostly uninhabited.

== Demographics ==
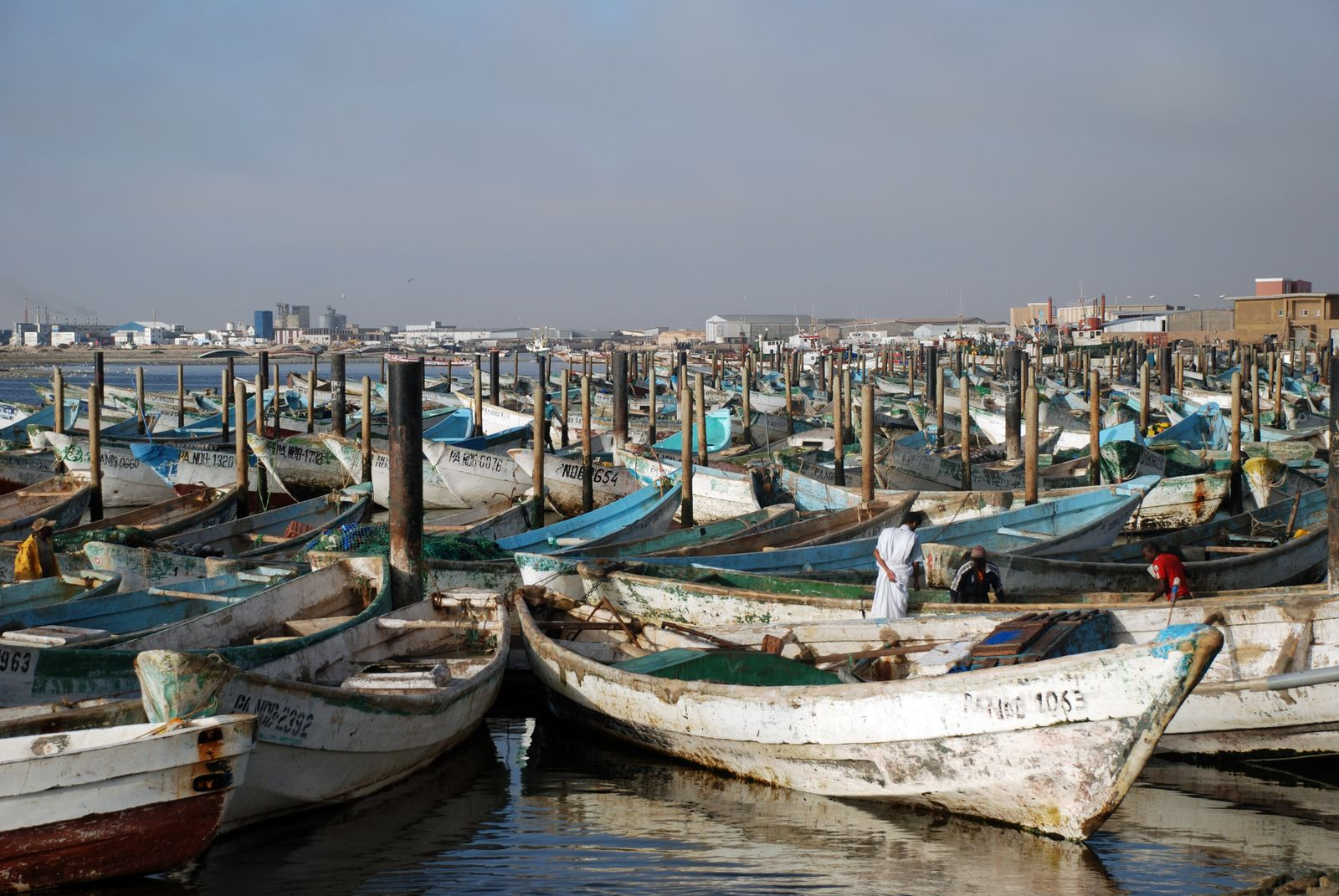
Port in Nouadhibou

Historical population
Year	Pop.	±% p.a.
1977	23,526	—
1988	63,030	+9.37%
2000	79,516	+1.96%
2013	123,779	+3.46%
2023	184,459	+4.07%

As of 2013, the population of the region was 123,779, compared to 97,875 in 2011. There were 57.05% female and 42.95% male. As of 2008, the number of couples with children was 35.60%, and the number of couples without children was 3.70%. The proportion with extended family was 37.90%, and extended single-parent was 8.60%, one-person was 6.50%, and single-parent nuclear was 7.80%.

As of 2008, the rate of households confirming the existence of a public telephone in their neighbourhood or village was 95.69%, the rate of households benefiting from electricity post in their neighbourhood was 12.63 percent, the rate of households benefiting from health center or health post in their neighbourhood was 2.53%, and the rate of households benefiting from sanitary services was 21.90%.

== Economy and development ==
As of 2008, the activity rate was 60.80%, and the economic dependency ratio was 0.59. The fraction of people working in government was 9.70 percent, individual/household private was 18.20%, other was 31.40%, para public was 16.10 percent, and private enterprise was 24.70 percent. The unemployment rate as of 2008 was 37.80. As of 2013, the coverage rate of DPT3 children from 0 to 11 months in the region was 89.90%, BGC vaccination was 80.10%, and polio vaccination coverage was 87.80%. As of 2007, the number of tourist establishments in the region was 19. As of 2008, the literacy rate for people aged 15 years and over was 73.50%. The net enrolment ratio of girls for secondary level was 35.90%, the net enrolment ratio of boys for secondary level was 26.10%, and the total net enrolment ratio at the secondary level was 31.60%.

== Geography ==
The region is named after the Dakhlet Nouadhibou Bay and contains Mauritania's part of the Cabo Blanco peninsula. It is the westernmost region of the country. It borders Western Sahara to the north, the Mauritanian region of Inchiri to the east, and the Atlantic Ocean to the west. The Bay of Arguin dominates the west of the region; the Banc d'Arguin National Park dominates the south and includes much of the bay's islands. The southernmost part of the bay and the southeasternmost parts of the park are not in the region; about a third of the region is a national park area. Nearly all of the country's islands and islets lie in this region, including Echakcher, Kiaones, Niroumi, Nair, Arel, Tidra, the country's largest island, Kijji, Touffat, Cheddid and sometimes Serenni.

Mauritania is mostly covered with desert, with only its western regions around the coast of the Atlantic Ocean having some vegetation, along with the southern regions on the Senegal River. There are some oases in the desert regions. Since it is a desert, there are large shifting dunes forming temporary ranges. The average elevation is around 460 m (1,510 ft) above the mean sea level. The rainfall in the northern regions closer to the Tropic of Cancer receives around 100 mm (3.9 in) of annual rainfall compared to the southern portions that receive around 660 mm (26 in). The average temperature is 37.8 °C (100.0 °F), while during the night it reaches 0 °C (32 °F).

Due to the geography, the inhabitants have historically been nomadic. In modern times, people have migrated to urban centres during the drought in the 1970s and the early 1980s. There are a few sedentary cultivators, who are located only in the Southern regions of the country. Research has indicated that the Saharan movement has resulted in a reduction of rainfall in the region from the 1960s, when it received close to 250 mm (9.8 in) of rainfall.

== Local administration ==
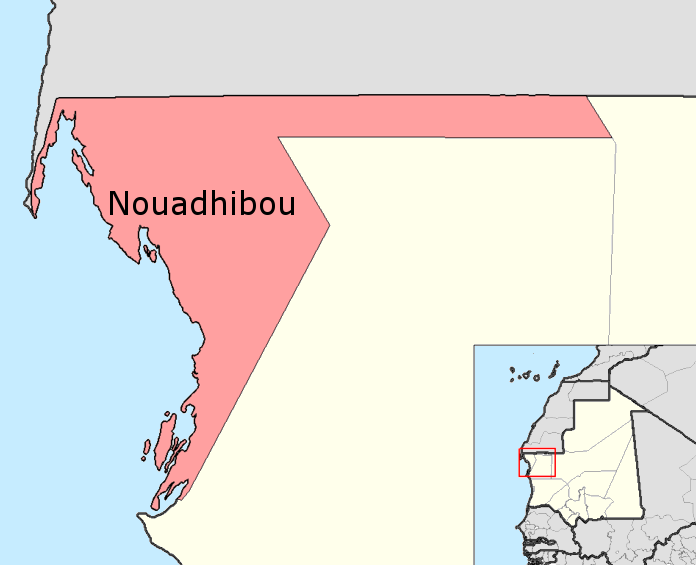
Dakhlet Nouadhibou region

The local administration is adopted from the French local administration framework, with the Ministry of Internal Control governing the local bodies. The original administration was held by Governors of each district, but after the municipal elections in 1994, the powers were decentralized from the district bodies.

Nouadhibou is one of 15 wilayas (regions). The smallest administrative division in the region is the commune. A group of communes forms a moughataa (department) and a group of moughataa form a district. The executive power of the district is vested in a district chief, while it is on the hakem in the moughataa.

The communes are responsible for overseeing and coordinating development activities and are financed by the state. The Local Governments have their own legal jurisdiction, financial autonomy, an annual budget, staff, and an office. The elections for the local government are conducted every five years along with regional and parliamentary elections. On account of the political instability, the last elections were held in 2023.

Settlements outside the regional capital include Agadir or Arguin, Arkeiss, R'Geiba, Chami, Iouik (or Iwik), Tanoudert, Teichott, Ten-Alloul and Tessot.

== See also ==
- Regions of Mauritania
- Departments of Mauritania
- Ras Nouadhibou
