= Azer dialect =

Mande language formerly spoken in West Africa

Azer
- Azayr
- Native to: Mali, Senegal, Mauritania
- Region: West Africa
- Ethnicity: Soninke
- Language family: Niger–Congo?: Mande; Western; Northwestern; Soninke–Bobo; Soninke–Bozo; Soninke; Azer

Language codes
- ISO 639-3: –
- Glottolog: azer1256

Azer or Azayr is a mostly or entirely extinct dialect of the Soninke language, heavily mixed with Berber and Hassaniya Arabic, formerly spoken in Mauritania and northern Mali.

== History and distribution ==
Azer arose as a lingua franca for trade across the Sahel, a mixture between Soninke and Berber, widely spoken in the salt-trading centres of Ouadane, Tinigi, Chinguetti, Tichit, Oualata, and Aoudaghost. The name is supposedly derived from the Berber term 'El Answar', their name for the Guiriganke or related Soninke group who founded these oasis towns. Azer's usage progressively declined beginning in the 16th century as it was replaced by Berber and Hassaniya.

Elements of the language were collected and studied by Heinrich Barth in the 19th century, Diego Brosset in 1930–1931 and Théodore Monod in 1934.

Some Berber and Nemadi communities in the Adrar Plateau, Araouane, Oualata, Néma and Taoudenni spoke Azer well into the 20th century. The language survives today mostly in place names such as Chinguetti, which means 'spring of horses'.

== Sources ==
- Blench, Roger (2019). "The Linguistic Prehistory of the Sahara". In Gatto, M. (ed.). Burials, Migration and Identity in the Ancient Sahara and Beyond (PDF). Cambridge University Press. pp. 431–463.
- Monteil, Charles (1939). La Langue azer (in French). Paris: Larose. p. 120.
- Nicolaï, Robert (1977). "Sur l'appartenance du songhay" (PDF). Annales de la faculté des lettres et sciences humaines de Nice (28).
- Webb, James L.A. (1994). Desert Frontier: Ecological and Economic Change Along the Western Sahel, 1600–1850. University of Wisconsin Press. ISBN 978-0-299-14334-3.
