= Alfred G. Gerteiny =

American author and scholar of Middle Eastern and African Studies

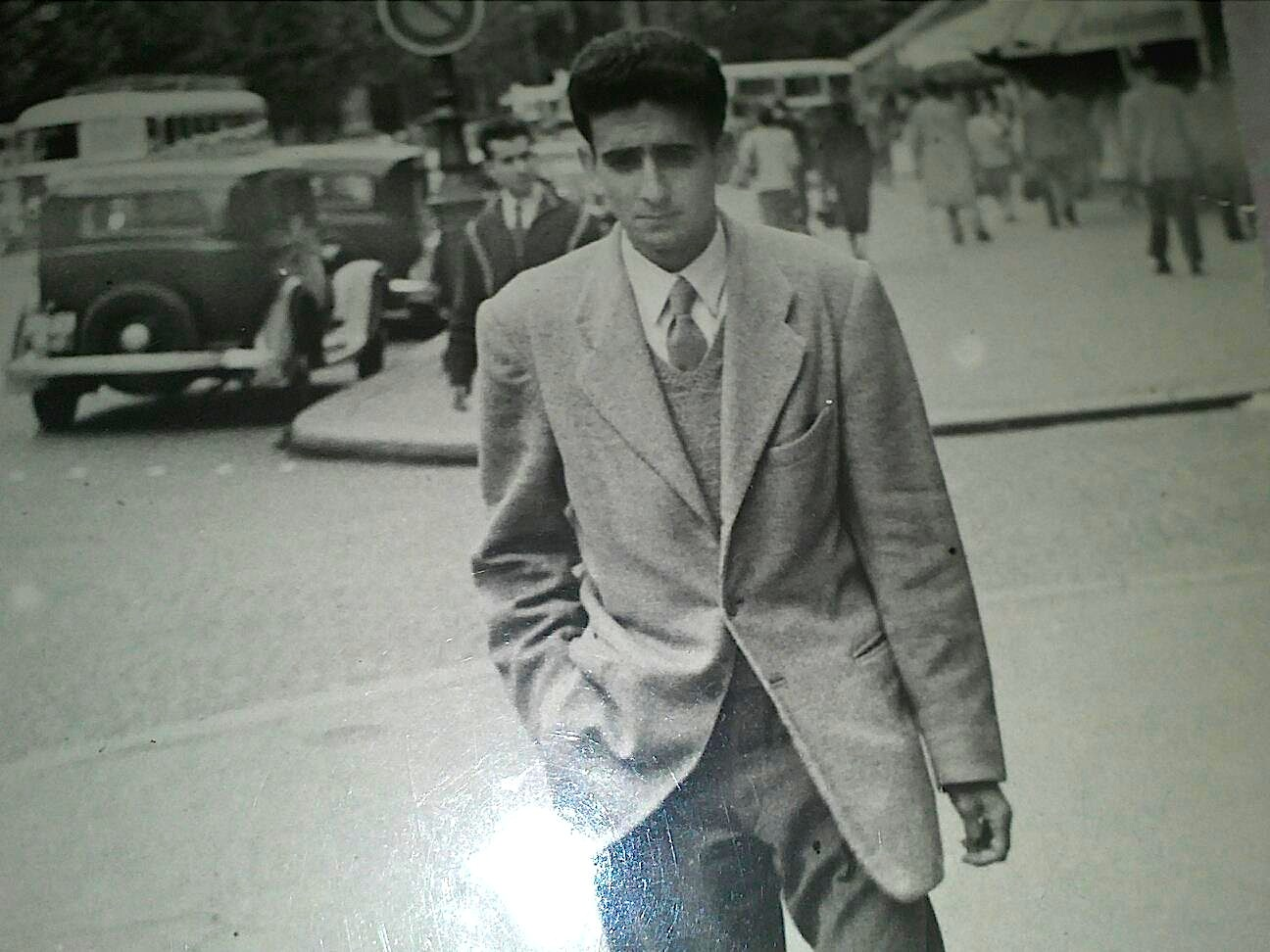
Gerteiny in Paris after completing final exams, 1956

Alfred G. Gerteiny (born 1930) is an American author and scholar of Middle Eastern and African Studies, a specialist on the Islamic Republic of Mauritania, the Palestinian issue, and International Terrorism. Gerteiny posits that the "imposition" of Israel in Palestine by the International Community was an unprecedented historical blunder, and U.S. blind support of Israel, its strategy, policies and practices in the Occupied Territories as instrumental to the instability and chaos in the Middle East. Gerteiny shares with Richard Arens, Chaim Shatan, and Richard Falk—UN Special Rapporteur on Palestine Human Rights—among others, the belief that these practices may amount to genocide, based on the interpretive comments of the progenitor of the UN Genocide Convention, Raphael Lemkin. Gerteiny considers that the two states solution to the conflict in Palestine is fundamentally flawed, not only because of the intractable mutual claim to the whole former mandate by the warring parties, but also because of its fundamental meaning and importance to Judaism, Christianity and Islam, the 3 branches of the Abrahamic Tradition. He has suggested that a more practical and equitable solution may be one patterned after the Helvetic model—an internationally neutralized "Holy Land Confederation," with Jewish, Christian and Muslim cantons, and with Jerusalem as capital. In the Terrorist Conjunction, he further argues that "bad foreign policy choices, when coupled with grievances in the Middle East, are a fuel that triggers terrorizing violence."

Before devoting his academic focus on the Middle East, Gerteiny was best known for his field work in, and expertise on the Islamic Republic of Mauritania hitherto unknown African territory, which mysteries he reported in books and journal articles.

As an academic, Gerteiny emphasized the fundamental importance of Tenure, Academic Freedom and Collegiality in the pursuit of truth, particularly at institutions of higher learning, and as president of the University of Bridgeport's Chapter of the American Association of University Professors, he led the longest higher education faculty strike in U.S. history in defense of these values, ultimately losing tenure and position, along with the striking faculty.

== Early life and education ==
Gerteiny was born in Heliopolis, Egypt, where he was reared in the family's French cultural tradition. He is the son of Officier d'Académie Georges J. Gerteiny, Secrétaire de l’Institut Français d’Archaéologie Orientale du Caire, and of Nabiha Sophie.

After completing the primary education cycle at the Heliopolis Jesuit school, Gerteiny graduated from the Lycée Français du Caire, and in Europe, from Institut d'Etude et de Recherches Diplomatique de Paris (ILERI). He also took specialized courses at the Hague Academy of International Law. In New York, he attended Columbia University's Middle East Institute, where he did graduate work under J. C. Hurewitz. He transferred to St. John's University, where he was awarded a Ph.D. in Contemporary History in 1963. His doctoral dissertation was supervised by Arpad F. Kovacs. Gerteiny lectured and conducted graduate seminars at St. John's University's African Studies Center, as well as at the University of Bridgeport where he served as chairman of History; he also lectured worldwide.

== Career ==
Gerteiny was a research assistant to the late Charles Ammoun, Lebanon's Ambassador to UNESCO, on the Apartheid Project, a managing editor at Grolier, Inc., and he developed, produced and hosted "As History Unfolds," a political discussion series on the University of Bridgeport (U.B-TV) public channel. Gerteiny served also as consultant on Mauritanian Affairs to the Peace Corps, to the PKNO-AURA, 1973 Solar Eclipse expedition to Mauritania, as well as to the Arizona State University's Meteoritic Institute, concerning their Chinguetti meteorite research planning project. He was a Senior Research Fulbright Scholar in Egypt, Tunisia and Morocco where he studied the determinants of these nations foreign policies, and later served twice on the National Screening Committee for Fulbright Grants to the MENA region. Dr. Gerteiny was honored by the University of Paris' Centre d'Analyse et de Recherches Documentaires pour l'Afrique Noire.; he is cited in the International Social Science Council's Directory of Africanists, the UNESCO Directory of Outstanding Social Scientists.

== Personal life ==
He was married in 1955 to Elizabeth Folsom Leppert, in Scarsdale, New York; they have 2 daughters and a son.

== Published works ==
- L’Evolution de l’Opinion Publique des Etats-Unis Face à la Guerre Froide en Turquie, (D.E.S. Dissertation) Institut International d’Etudes et Recherches Diplomatique, Paris, 1956.
- The Concept of Positive Neutralism in the United Arab Republic, Ph.D. Dissertation) St. John's University, New York, 1963.
- Mauritania, Praeger (and Pall Mall, London, U.K) Library of African Affairs, Frederic A. Praeger, New York, 1967.
- Historical Dictionary of Mauritania, Scarecrow Press, Metuchen, N.J., 1981. ISBN 9780810814332.
- Mauritania, Frederick A. Praeger, N.Y., 1967; Pall Mall Press, London, U.K., 1968.
- Observations And Recommendations Concerning Allegations Of Human Rights Violations In the Islamic Republic of Mauritania.
- "Islamic Influences on Politics in Mauritania" in D. McCall and N. Bennett, (eds.)Aspects of West African Islam, (Boston University Papers on Africa, Vol. V.) Ch. 11, pp. 209–223, African Studies Center, Boston University, Boston, MA, 1971.
- "The Threat of Peace in the Middle East," World Review, Vol. 10, No. 1, pp. 12–19, Australian Institute of International Affairs, University of Queensland Press, Brisbane, Aus. March, 1971.
- "Morocco-Mauritania, 1957-1970 case," Cascon (Computer-based System for Handling Information on Local Conflicts_, Center of International Studies, M.I.T., Cambridge, MA, 1972.
- "On The History, Ethnology and Political Philosophy of Mauritania," The Maghreb Review, Vol. 3, Nos. 7–8, pp. 1–6, London, U.K., May–August, 1978
- "Justice And The Palestinians," in T.M. Thomas and Jesse Levvitt, (eds.) Justice: Interdisciplinary and Global Perspectives, University Press of America, pp. 203–234, Lanham, MD and London, U.K., 1988, ISBN 0819170933.
- "Perceptions of the Union President," in Collins, Denis, The Longest Faculty Strike in U.S. Higher Education: Perspectives from Key Participants, Journal of Academic Ethics (Special Issue) Vol. 1, No. 3, pp. 273–285, Kluwer Academic Publishers, Dordrecht, N.L, 2003.
- The Terrorist Conjunction: The United States, The Israeli-Palestinian Conflict and al-Qā’ida, (A Praeger Security International Imprint) Greenwood Publishers, Westport, CT., and London UK 2007; Pentagon Press, New Delhi, 2008. ISBN 9780275996437.
- Observations and Recommendations Concerning Allegations of Human Rights Violations in the Islamic Republic of Mauritania, University of North Carolina-Charlotte, Intercultural Training Institute, 1996 (Report submitted to the US Department of State via the United States Embassy in Nouackchotte, IRM, and the United Nations Human Rights Commission.

== Book reviews ==
- Muddle of the Middle East, Volumes I and II: Chatterji, Nikshoy C.: New York: Humanities Press Vol. I, 466 pp.; Vol. II, 442 pp., Publication Date: August 1973.History: Reviews of New Books, Volume 2, 1974 – Issue 6. Published online: 13 Jul 2010
- The Arab Lands of Western Asia: Malone, Joseph J.: (The Modern Nations in Historical Perspective Series): Englewood Cliffs, N.J.: Prentice-Hall, 269 pp., Publication Date: August 4, 1973. History: Reviews of New Books, Volume 2, 1973 – Issue 2. Published online: 13 Jul 2010
- Egypt: Imperialism and Revolution: Berque, Jacques (Translated by Jean Stewart): New York: Praeger Publishers, 736 pp., Publication Date: November 30, 1972.History: Reviews of New Books, Volume 1, 1973 – Issue 4. Published online: 13 Jul 2010
- The British in Egypt: Mansfield, Peter: New York: Holt, Rinehart and Winston, Inc., 351 pp., Publication Date: May 15, 1972.History: Reviews of New Books, Volume 1, 1972 – Issue 1. Published online: 09 Jul 2012
