= Japanese torpedo boat Kiji =

Two Japanese warships have borne the name Kiji:

- Japanese torpedo boat Kiji (1903), a Hayabusa-class torpedo boat launched in 1903 and stricken in 1923
- Japanese torpedo boat Kiji (1937), an Ōtori-class torpedo boat launched in 1937 and ceded to Russia as Vnimatel'nyy in 1947 .
