= Arak gorges =

Series of gorges in Algeria

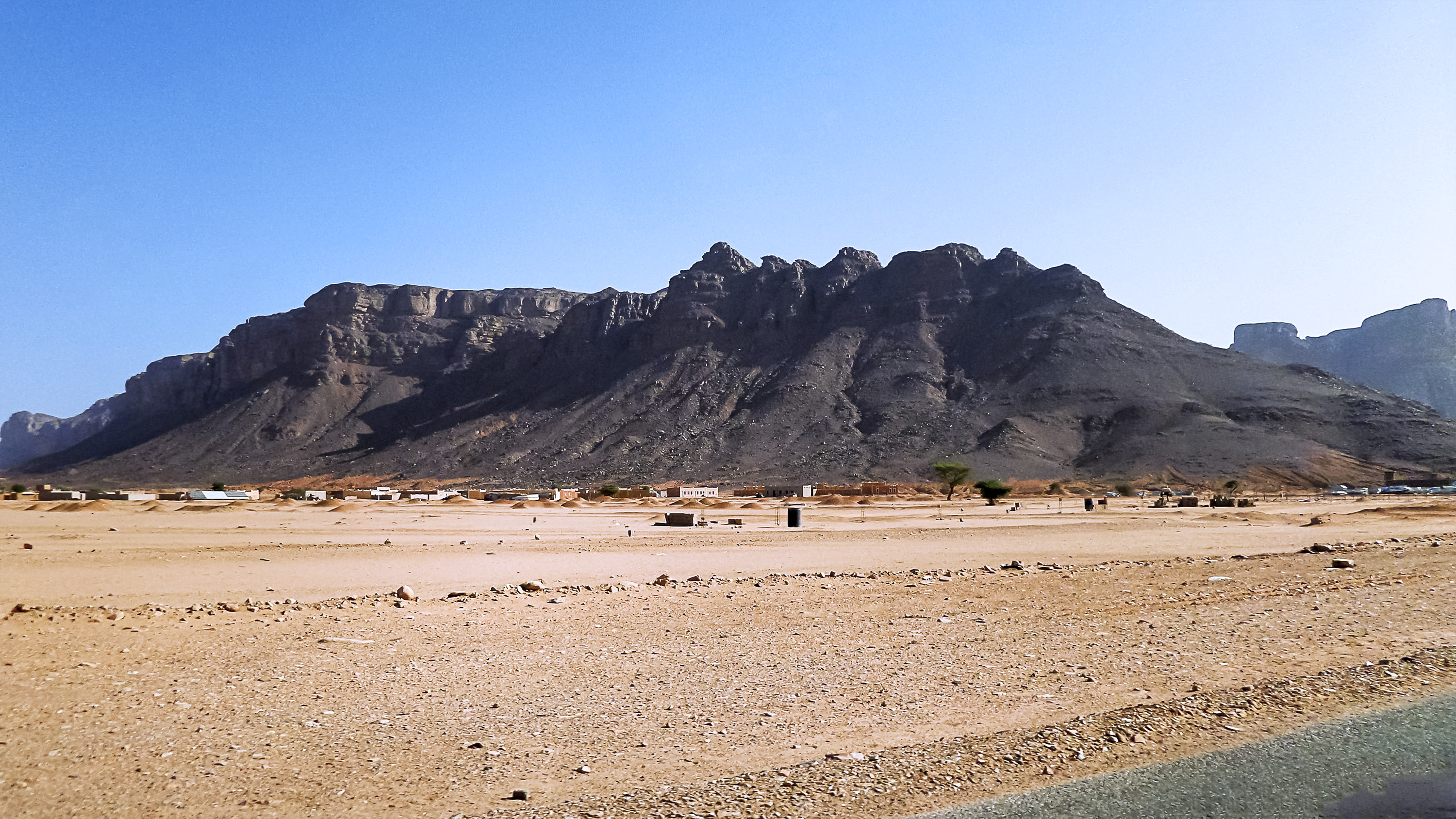

- Location within Algeria

Geography
- Location: Tamanrasset Province, Algeria
- Coordinates: 25°17′23″N 3°44′39″E
- Interactive map of Arak gorges

The Arak gorges are a series of desert gorges located in Tamanrasset Province, Algeria. The gorges are roughly 330 kilometres from the city of Tamanrasset. Carved by ancient river activity, the canyon walls vary in height from 250 to 500 metres (820 to 1,600 ft), and the canyon base is now a dry wadi.

Despite the extremely dry climate (only 60 to 75 mm of rain per year), hardy desert plants and animals survive in the gorges. Examples include the red-headed rock agama, wheatear birds, and small vultures. There are no permanent human settlements in the gorges, though stone tools and burial mounds indicate the occasional human presence throughout history.

== Gallery ==
Topographic map of the region surrounding Arak

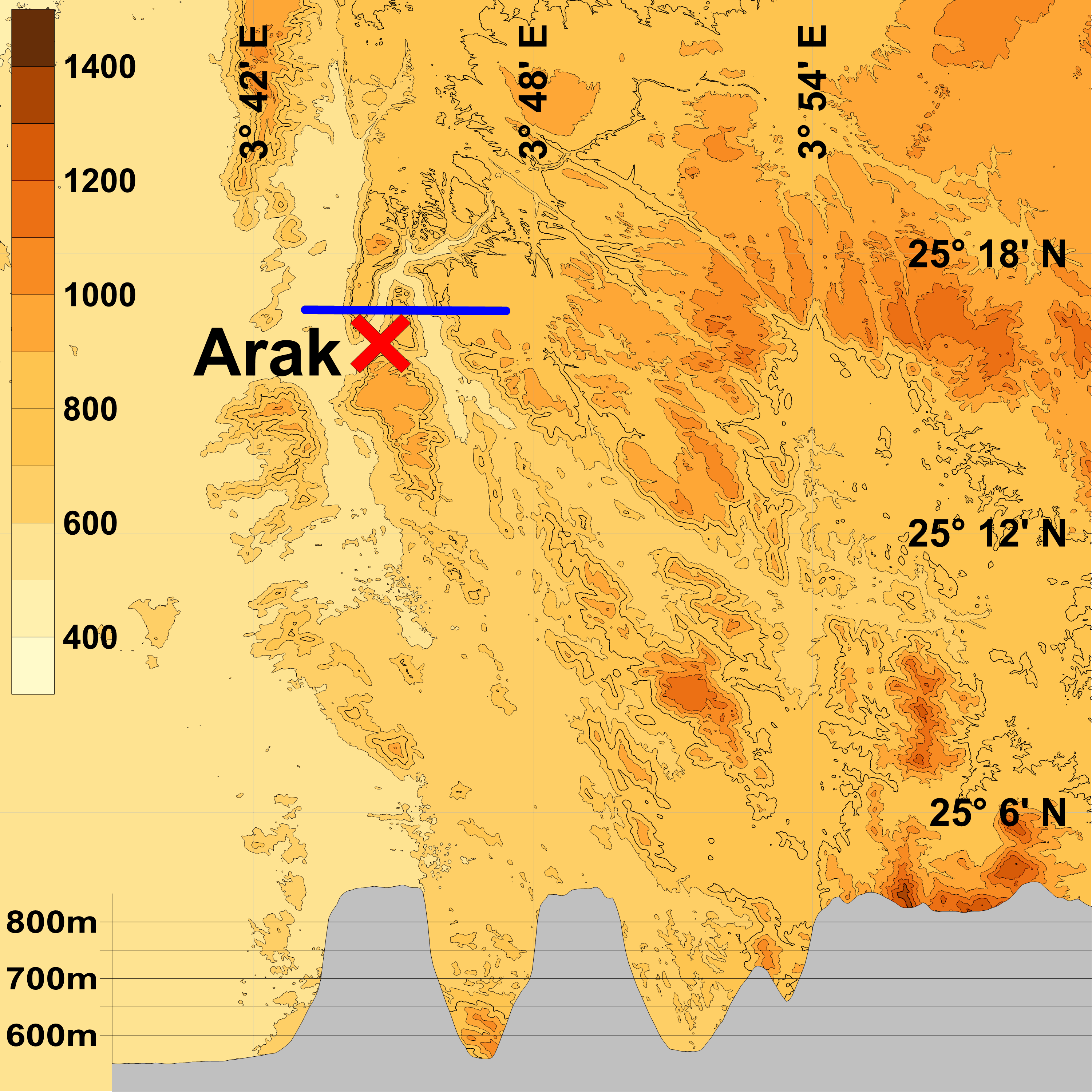
Location of Arak and altimetric profile through the gorges
