= Cansado =

Cansado كانصادو
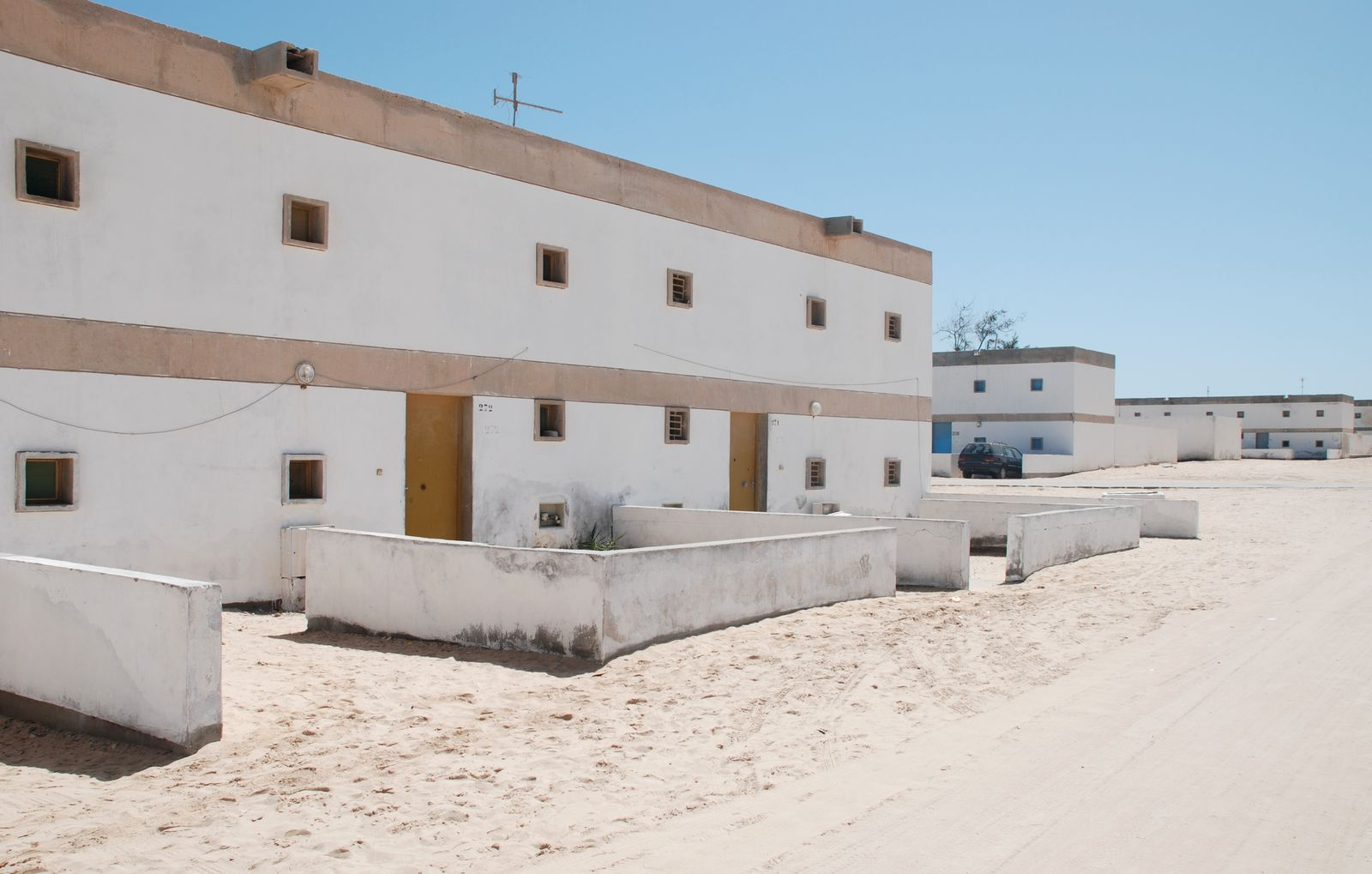

- Location in Mauritania
- Coordinates: 20°51′12″N 17°1′57″W
- Country: Mauritania
- Region: Dakhlet Nouadhibou

Cansado (Arabic: كانصادو) is a coastal town in north-western Mauritania on the Ras Nouadhibou peninsula. It is located in the Nouadhibou Department in the Dakhlet Nouadhibou region.

It was built from scratch in the early 1960s for the staff administering the port and railhead for the iron ore mining company MIFERMA (Societe Anonyme des Mines de Fer de Mauritanie) as part of their iron mine development project at Zouérate.

Nearby towns and villages include Uad Guenifa (3.9 nmi (7.2 km; 4.5 mi)), La Batterie (2.1 nmi (3.9 km; 2.4 mi)), Nouadhibou (3.5 nmi (6.5 km; 4.0 mi)), Bir Gandus (54 nmi (100 km; 62 mi)), Tanoudert (59.6 nmi (110.4 km; 68.6 mi)) and Iouik (72 nmi (133 km; 83 mi)).

== See also ==
- Railway stations in Mauritania
