= Kijji =

Island off the coast of The Banc d'Arguin National Park, Mauritania

Kiji is a small island off the coast of The Banc d'Arguin National Park, Mauritania. The island is uninhabited. Its area is 13,5 km^{2}; its length is 7.8 km and its width is 2.2 km.

The isle is located west of the main island of Tidra; the smaller islet of Touffat lies to the south.
