= Tidra =

Island in Mauritania

Coordinates: 19.73°N 16.39°W

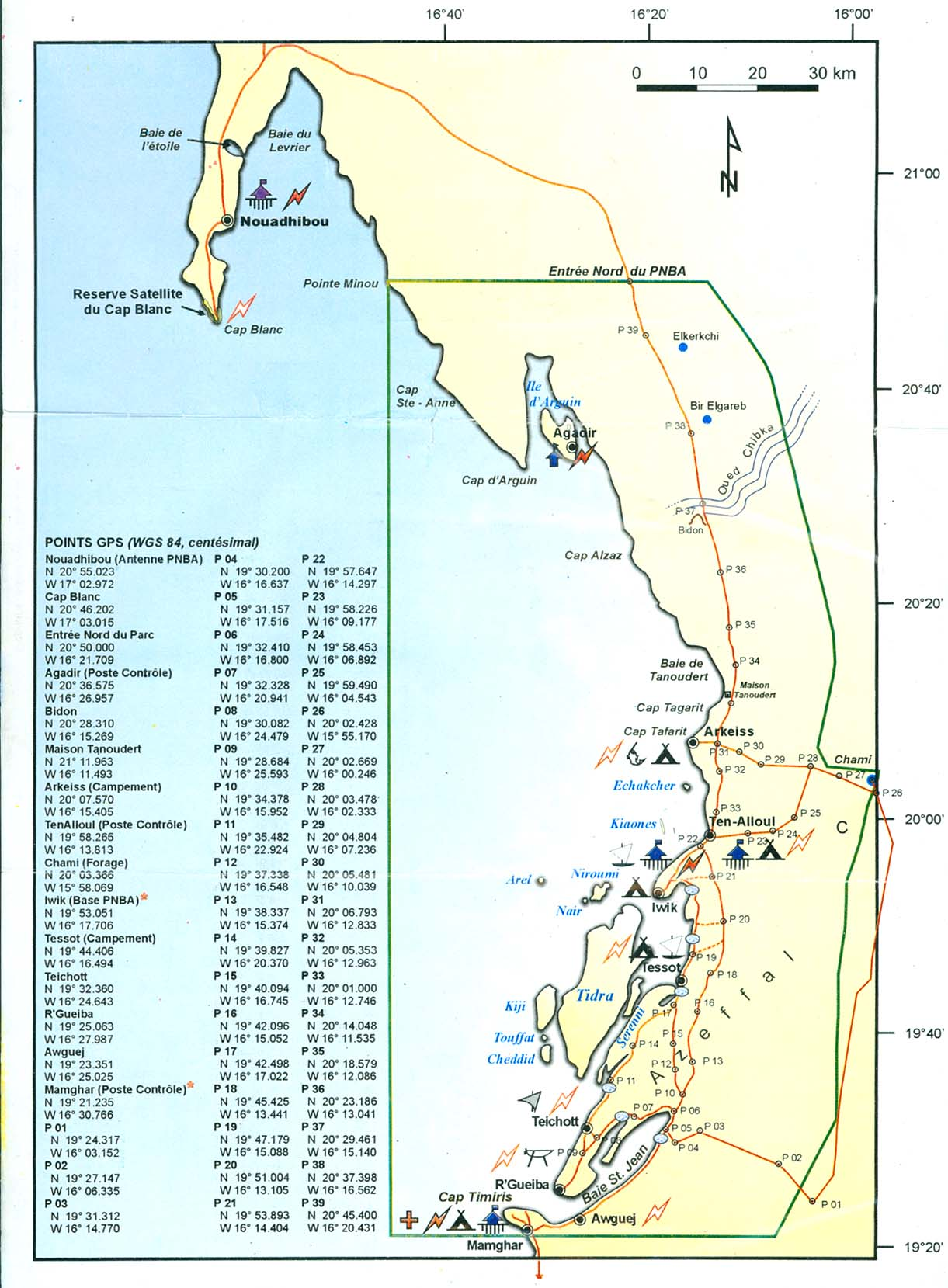
Map of Banc d'Arguin including Tidra Island and Arguin

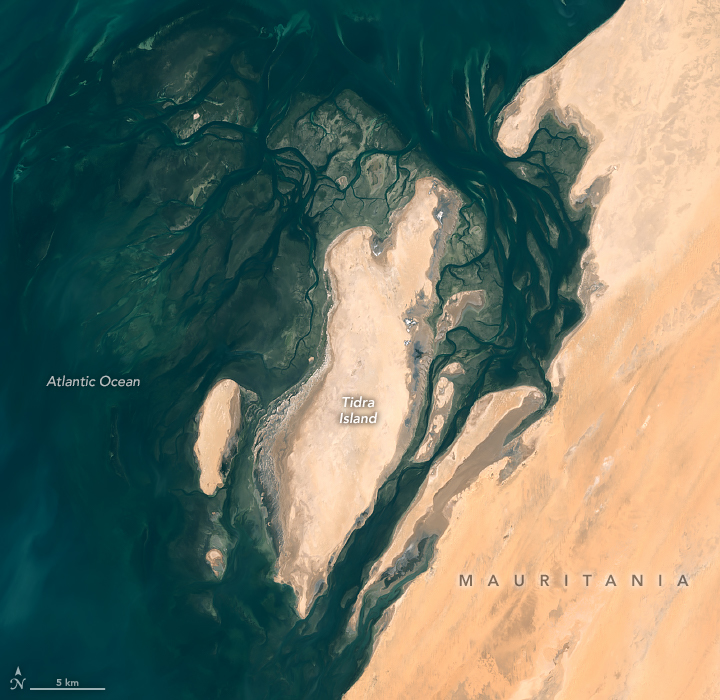
Banc d'Arguin from orbit, 2019

Tidra (Arabic: تيدرة) is an offshore island 29 kilometres (18 miles) long and 8 km (5 mi) wide. It is the largest island off the shore of Banc d' Arguin, Mauritania (also being the largest in the nation) and is home to a community of Imraguen fishing tribe. The island is part of the Banc d'Arguin National Park.

Nearby islands and islets include Nair to the north, Cheddid to the southwest and Kijji to the west, the peninsula (then island) of Serenni lies to the east together with mainland Mauritania roughly 2 to 3 km, nearby towns across in the mainland includes Iwik to the northeast and Tessot to the east.

During the prehistoric era, Tidra was once connected to the mainland until some 6,000 to 5,000 years ago when the rise of the sea level split it from the mainland.
