= Imraguen people =

Ethnic group of Mauritania and Western Sahara

Imraguen
Total population
- 23,800 (2016)

Regions with significant populations
- Western Sahara: 23.000 (2016)
- Mauritania: 800 (2016)

Languages
- Hassaniya Arabic

Religion
- Sunni Islam

The Imraguen, or Imeraguen (Berber: Imrāgen; singular: Amrig), are a Berber ethnic group or tribe of Mauritania and Western Sahara. They were estimated at around 5,000 individuals in the 1970s. Most members of the group live in or nearby Mauritania's Banc d'Arguin National Park.

== History ==
The name Imraguen (Berber orthography: imrāgen) is a Berber word meaning "fishermen", or "people who fish while walking on the sea", or "those who harvest life".

The Imraguen are believed to descend from the Bafour people. According to the Documentation of the human population of the territory, the Imraguen people lived on the Banc d'Arguin National Park for thousands of years, and its population had probably been larger.

Militarily powerless, the Imraguen were traditionally reduced to the degrading lower-caste status of Znaga, forcibly ruled and taxed (horma) by more powerful Berber, Hassane and Zawia tribes, such as the Oulad Delim and Ouled Bou Sbaa.

In 2008, the Imraguen people occupied 9 small villages along the coastline. Some Imraguen populate the abandoned La Güera fort, which is also the south point of the Western Sahara zone claimed by Morocco.

== Fishing ==
A few generations ago, the Imraguen people used to whistle the dolphins to bring them near the shore and catch all the mullets that always followed the dolphins.

The Imraguen people are the only ones authorized to fish in the Banc d'Arguin area, as long as they use their traditional fishing techniques. The number of fishes caught for each species is limited and strongly reinforced by the Mauritanian authorities. In 2004, the Imraguen people agreed to preserve the shark and ray species in the Banc d'Arguin National Park (which became a UNESCO world heritage site in 1989) and traded their nets for money.

The Imraguen people blame the new oil and gas explorations around the Banc d'Arguin area, along with a new road adjacent to the area, as the main factors for the reduction of fish reproduction in the area.

At the Arkeiss village, it is possible for tourists to practice "sports fishing" in the Banc d'Arguin and gather up to 5 kilos of fish.

== Language ==
Imeraguen
- Imraguen
- Native to: Mauritania
- Region: Banc d'Arguin National Park
- Ethnicity: Imraguen
- Native speakers: 530 (2006)
- Language family: Unclassified (Hassaniya Arabic variety with an Azer (Soninke) base per Ethnologue or Berber base per Fortier, Corinne 2004)

Language codes
- ISO 639-3: (ime deprecated in 2015 as spurious)
- Glottolog: imer1236

The Imraguen speak Hassaniya Arabic with some Berber vocabulary related to fishing; their dialect is referred to as the Imraguen language.

== Religion ==
The Imraguen are Muslims of the Sunni Maliki rite.
