= Tamanrasset River =

Ancient, inactive river in Algeria

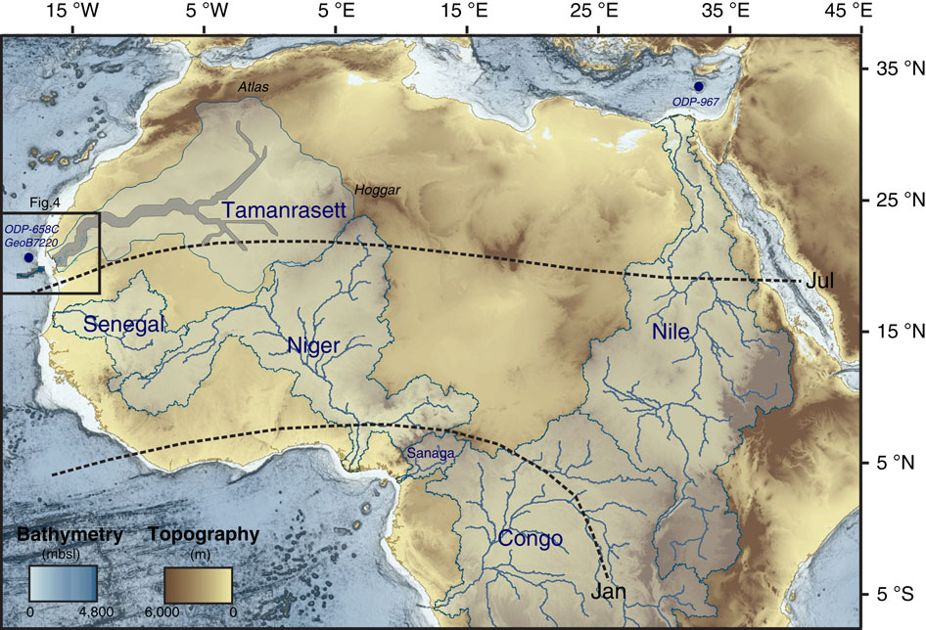
Outline of the main course of the Tamanrasset along with the present-day active Nile, Senegal, Niger, Sanaga and Congo.

The Tamanrasset River is an enormous palaeoriver believed to have flowed through West Africa as recently as 5000 years ago during the African humid period. The Tamanrasset River basin is thought to have been comparable with the present-day Ganges–Brahmaputra river basin in Asia.

== Tributaries ==
Western side:

- Oued Saoura
- Oued Namous

Eastern side:

- Oued Tamanrasset

== Overview ==
The Tamanrasset is thought to have flowed across the Sahara in ancient times from sources in the southern Atlas Mountains and Hoggar Mountains in what is now Algeria.

It is thought the river fed into the Cap Timiris Canyon, located off the coast of Mauritania; the canyon is located in waters three kilometres deep and is 2.5km wide in places.

The presence of the river is thought to have had wide-ranging implications for human migration from Central Africa to the Middle East, Europe, and Asia. Previously, the inhospitable Sahara desert was believed to have made a western route for migrating to Europe unviable.

Researchers believe that the ancient river became active during the African Humid Period, climate oscillations caused by the precession of the Earth's rotation.

The palaeoriver was discovered using a Japanese orbital satellite system called Phased Array type L-band Synthetic Aperture Radar (PALSAR). Using microwave sensing, PALSAR can see below Saharan sands and detect the fossil water still present.

The Tamanrasset has been noted as a possible location for an ancient Saharan civilization based solely on comparisons with similar contemporary river systems and their associated civilizations. The existence and location of the Tamanrasset River was only confirmed by scientists in 2015, although an expedition looking for oil found the Cap Timiris Canyon in 2003 which was likely formed by the flow of the sediment-laden freshwater of this river system. Currently no evidence exists of any former civilization or agricultural community which dates to the time in which the river was present.

== See also ==
- Arak gorges
- African humid period
