= Inchiri region =

Region of Mauritania

Inchiri ولاية إينشيري
- Region of Mauritania
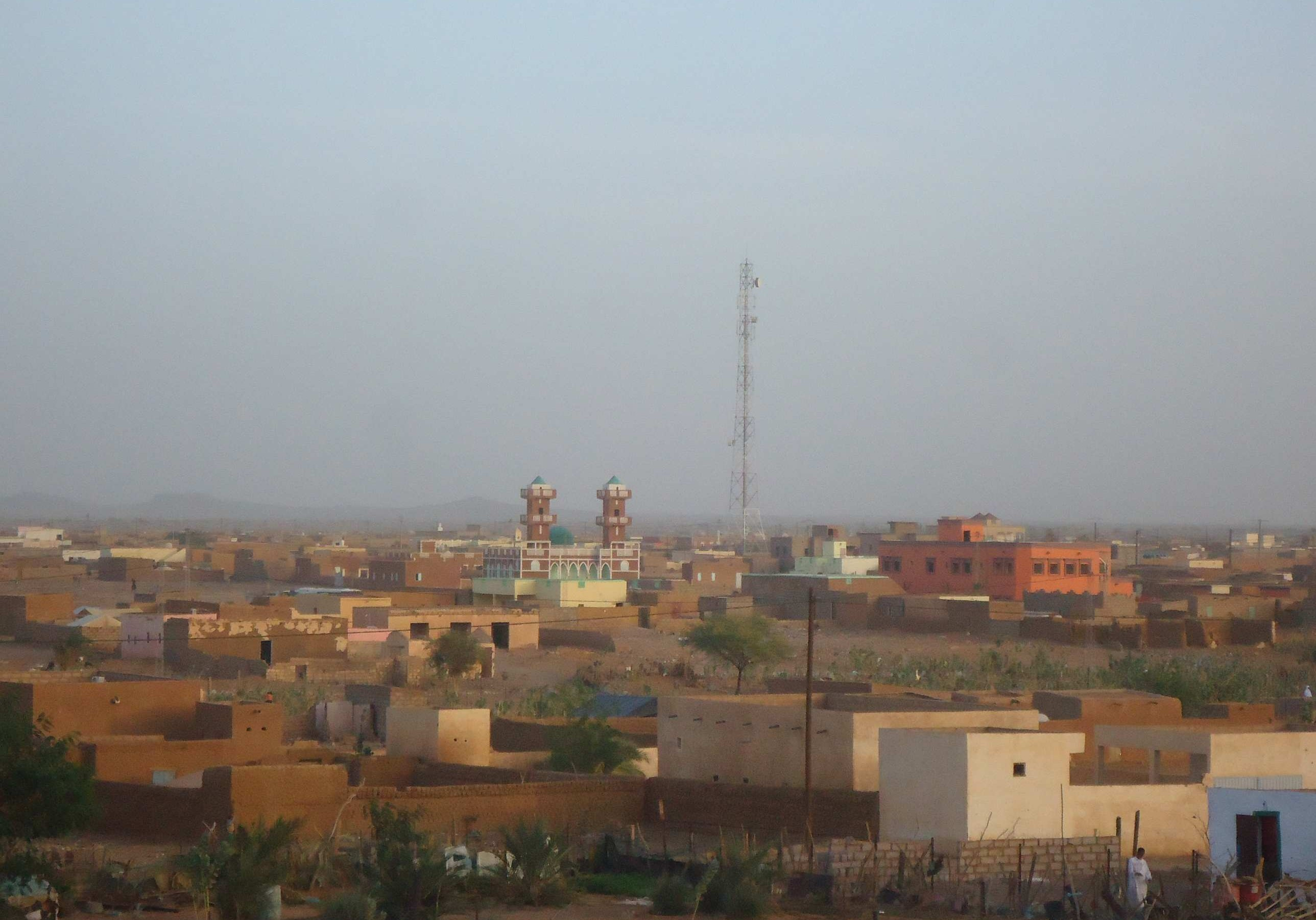

- Coordinates: 20°04′N 15°04′W
- Country: Mauritania
- Departments: 1: Akjoujt
- Capital: Akjoujt

Area
  - Total: 47,000 km^{2} (18,000 sq mi)

Population (2023 census)
  - Total: 29,484
  - Density: 0.63/km^{2} (1.6/sq mi)
- Time zone: UTC+0
  - Summer (DST): not observed
- HDI (2017): 0.643 medium

Inchiri (Arabic: ولاية إينشيري, romanized: Wilāyat Inshiri) is a region in western Mauritania. Its capital and only city is Akjoujt. It borders the regions of Adrar to the east, Trarza to the south, and Dakhlet Nouadhibou to the north and west, along with a short Atlantic Ocean coastline. The region is known for its rich copper deposits, and therefore is heavily mined. According to the World Health Organization, there is a malaria risk during the rainy season, which lasts from July to October. Former president Mohamed Ould Abdel Aziz was born and raised in Akjoujt.

== Demographics ==
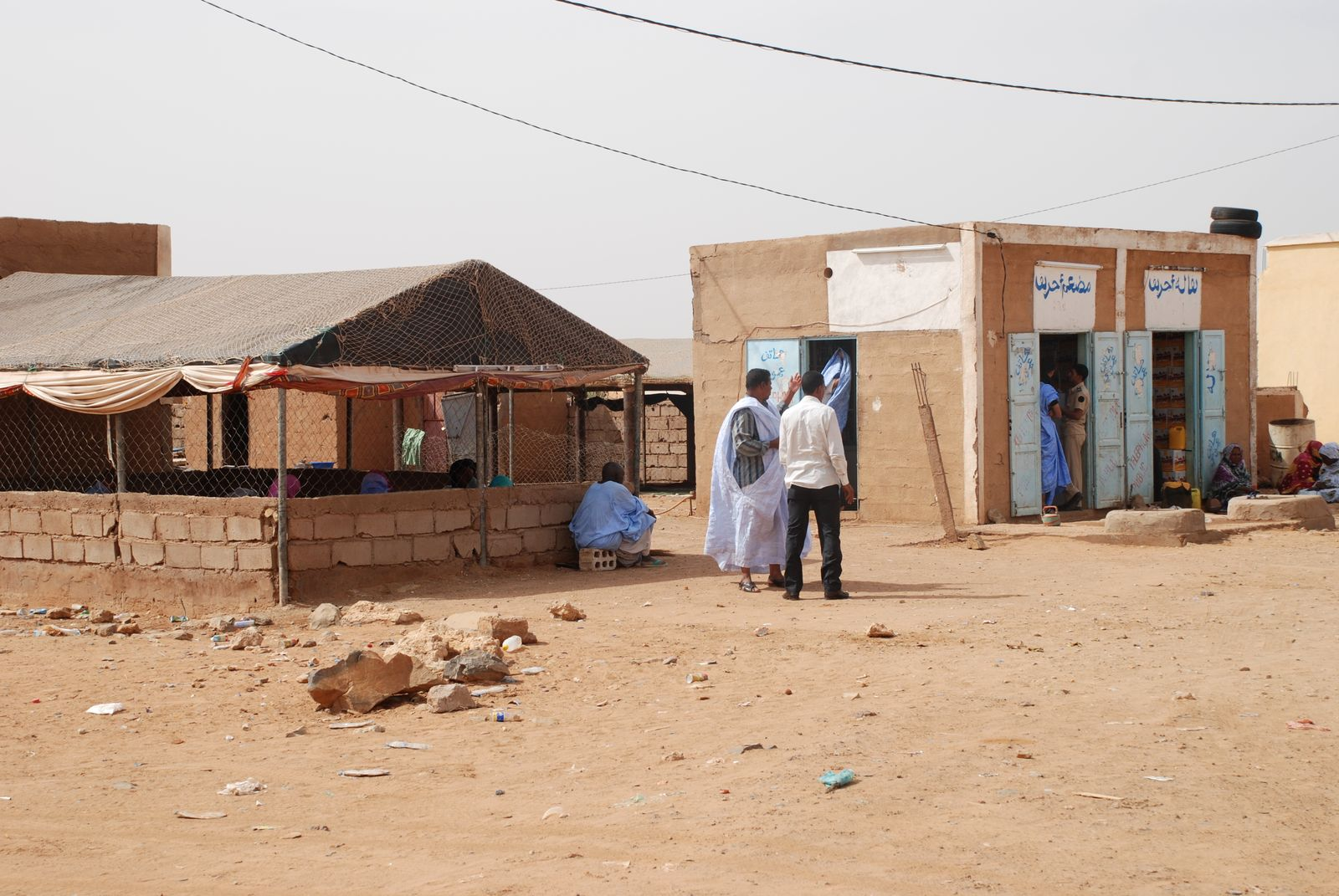
Households in Akjoujt

As of 2016, the population of the region was 20,386, compared to 19,639 in 2013 and 15,609 in 2011. The 2016 population included 10,812 males and 9,575 females.

== Economy, health and education ==
As of 2008, the economic activity rate was 59.8% and the dependency ratio was 0.69. As of 2014, 26.1% of people worked for the government, 18.5% worked for private businesses, and 22.8% were self-employed. As of 2015, 97.4% of children aged 0 to 11 months had received the DPT vaccine, 76.0% had received the BCG vaccine, and 97.4% had received the polio vaccine. As of 2008, the literacy rate for people aged 15 years and over was 63.6%. The net enrollment ratio of girls in secondary level was 19.4% and that of boys was 10.0%. The region has also become a hub for the gold mining industry.

As of 2014, The unemployment rate of the average Mauritanian within Inchiri was 17.9%, The dependency ratio was 1.2, and the access to water was estimated to be around 87.6%. The vast majority of households as of 2014 did not have access to any type of home computer system, with the ownership rate being around 3.4%. More recent information on the current economic state of the Inchiri region remains hard to come by, as the government hasn't updated its economic census on the region in many categories since 2008.

The goldmine with what seems to be the most accessible information about it seems to be the Tasiast Gold Mine in Northern Inchiri. The mine seems to be operated by Tasiast Mauritanie Ltd. S.A, a subsidiary of Kinross Gold Corporation which is located in Canada. While gold is the most attractive mineral available in Inchiri, there's multiple other minerals within the region. Those being:

Asbestos, Beryllium, Chromium, Cobalt, Copper, Gold, Iron, Nickel, Titanium, and Tungsten. The majority of mining operations occur away from popular residential areas.

== See also ==
- Regions of Mauritania
- Departments of Mauritania
- Tasiast Gold Mine
