= Banc d'Arguin National Park =

Mauritanian National Park

Banc d'Arguin National Park حوض أركين
- IUCN category II (national park)
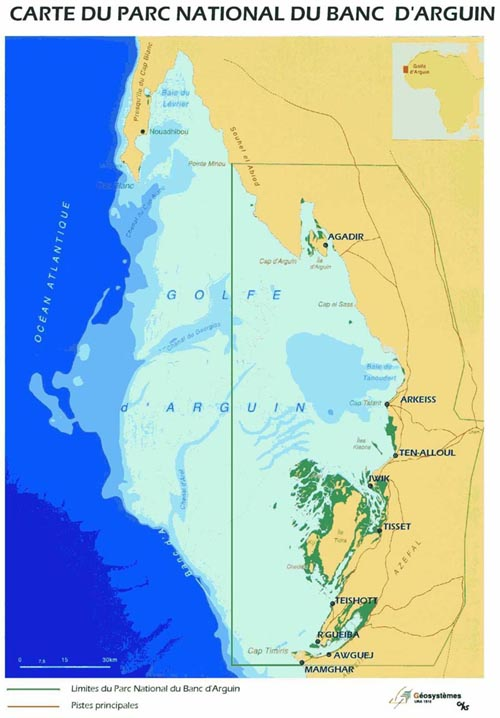
- Map of the bay showing the Banc d'Arguin National Park

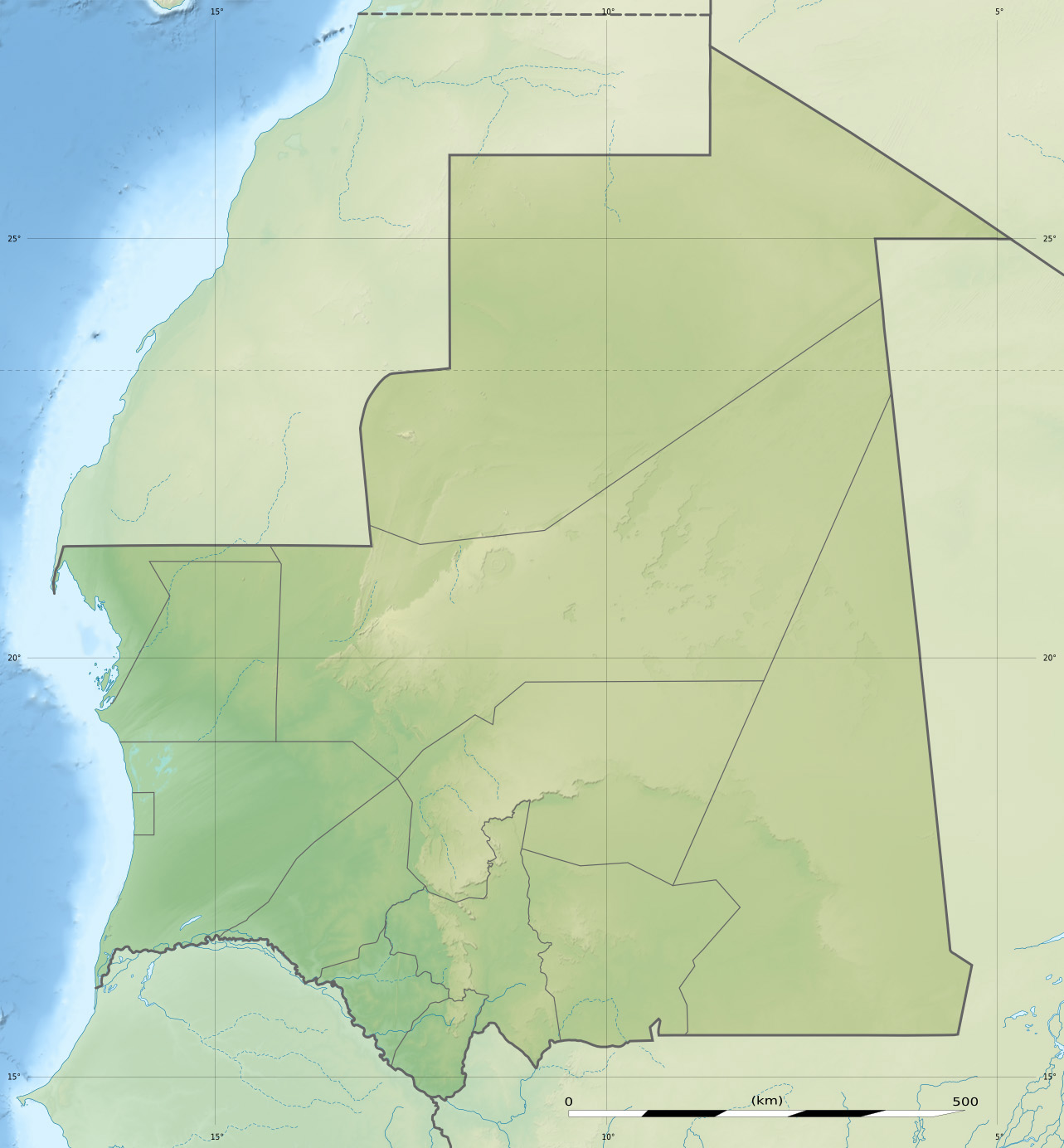
- Location within Mauritania
- Location: Mauritania
- Nearest city: Nouakchott and Nouadhibou
- Coordinates: 20°14′N 16°06′W
- Area: 12,000 km^{2} (4,600 sq mi)
- Established: 1976
- Governing body: IUCN

UNESCO World Heritage Site
- Type: Natural
- Criteria: ix, x
- Designated: 1989 (13th session)
- Reference no.: 506
- Region: Arab States

Ramsar Wetland
- Official name: Parc National du Banc d'Arguin
- Designated: 22 October 1982
- Reference no.: 250

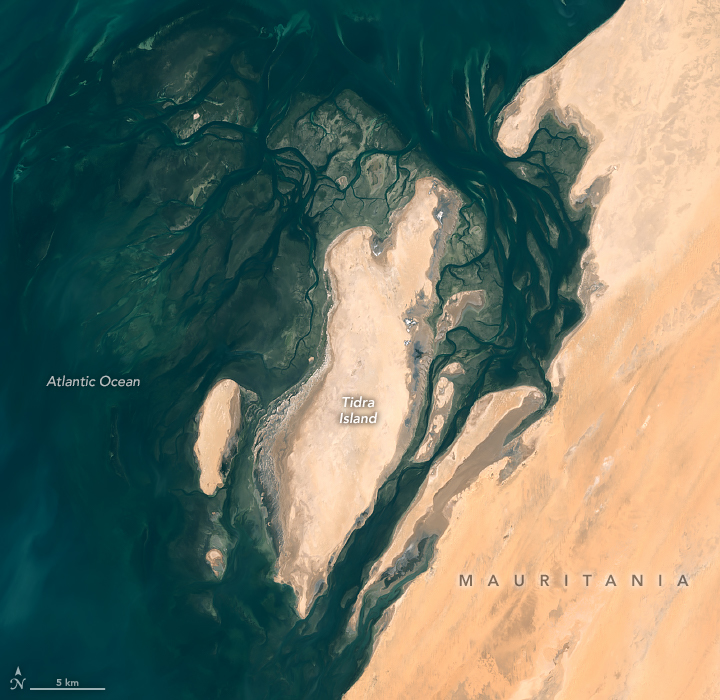
Banc d'Arguin from orbit, 2019

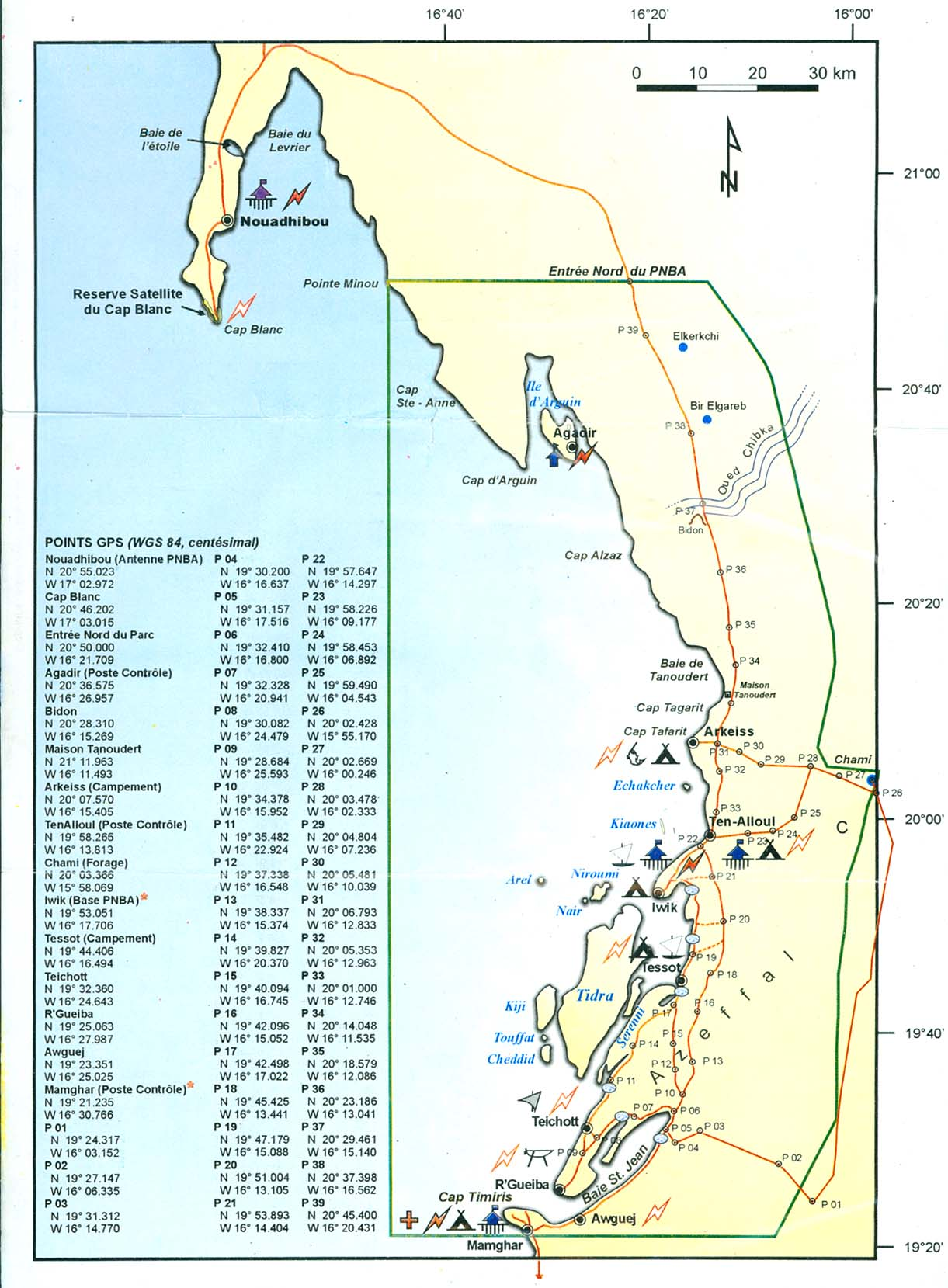
Map of Banc d'Arguin including Tidra Island and Arguin

The Banc d'Arguin National Park (Arabic: حوض أركين, romanized: Ḥawḍ ʾArkīn, French: Parc national du Banc d'Arguin) of Bay of Arguin lies in Western Africa on the west coast of Mauritania between Nouakchott and Nouadhibou and is the former mouth of the Tamanrasset River. The World Heritage Site is a major site for migratory birds and breeding birds, including flamingos, pelicans and terns. Much of the breeding is on sand banks including the islands of Tidra, Niroumi, Nair, Kijji and Arguim. The surrounding waters are some of the richest fishing waters in western Africa and serve as nesting grounds for the entire western region.

The Banc d'Arguin National Park is a nature reserve that was established in 1976 to protect both the natural resources and the valuable fisheries, which makes a significant contribution to the national economy, as well as scientifically and aesthetically valuable geological sites, in the interests of and for the recreation of the general public.

The park's vast expanses of mudflats provide a home for over two million migrant waders from northern Europe, Siberia and Greenland. The region's mild climate and absence of human disturbance makes the park one of the most important sites in the world for these species. The nesting bird population is also noted for its great numbers and diversity. Between 25,000 and 40,000 pairs belonging to 15 species, making the largest colonies of water birds in West Africa. The park has been designated an Important Bird Area (IBA) by BirdLife International because it supports large numbers of wintering waterbirds.

== Conservation ==
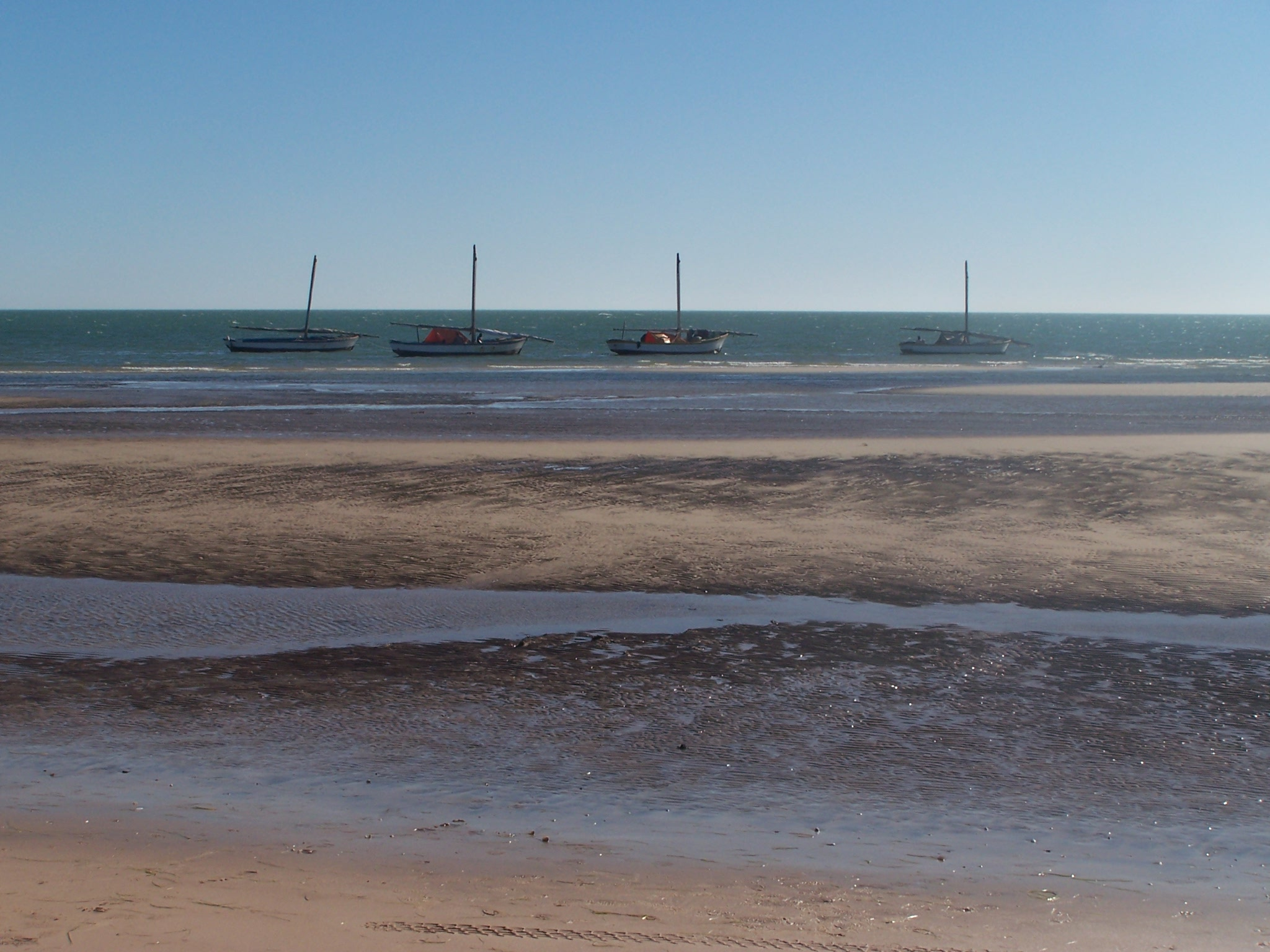
Fishing boats at Banc d'Arguin

The extensive intertidal flats of Parc National du Banc d'Arguin shelters on the most pristine seagrass beds on earth. Human impact is still at its minimum compared to the other intertidal systems along the East Atlantic Flyway. Only a small indigenous community is allowed to fish in the Park boundaries using relatively primitive techniques and tools. No motor boats are permitted in the area. Over the last decade, however, the international shark/ray market made its way to PNBA. Locals started to target these species even though it is not allowed. It is perhaps the most challenging issue facing conservation in the park.

== People ==
The local population comprises about 500 or so Imraguen tribesmen that live in seven villages within the park. They base their economy on subsistence fishing using traditional methods.

== Fauna ==
The park is host to one of the world's most diversified communities of nesting piscivorous birds in the world. At least 108 bird species have been recorded, representing both Palaearctic and Afrotropical realms. Wintering waders and other wetland birds number over two million, and include greater flamingo (maximum 96,000), ringed plover (maximum nearly 98,000), grey plover (maximum 68,000), red knot (maximum 366,000), curlew sandpiper (maximum nearly 250,000), sanderling (maximum 50,000), dunlin (maximum one million), little stint (maximum 65,000), common redshank (maximum 120,000), and bar-tailed godwit (maximum 500,000).

Along with the regions in north such as the Cintra Bay and Dakhla Peninsula, the area is one of the most important wintering grounds for Eurasian spoonbill. Breeding birds include white pelican, reed cormorant, gull-billed tern, Caspian tern, West African crested tern, and common tern, together with several species or subspecies with an African distribution, such as grey heron, Eurasian spoonbill and western reef heron.

For marine mammals, endangered species can be seen here all-year round; for example, Mediterranean monk seals, Atlantic humpback dolphins and bottlenose dolphins. Other species can be seen here are orca (killer whales), pilot whales, Risso's dolphins, dolphins (common, rough-toothed). Fin whales and harbour porpoises are also known to visit the area.

Banc d'Arguin is rich in fish and the rare false shark ray is only known from this region.

== Flora ==
Battering surf and shifting sand banks are found along the entire length of the shoreline. The Ras Nouadhibou (formerly Cap Blanc) peninsula, which forms Dakhlet Nouadhibou (formerly Lévrier Bay) to the east, is 50 kilometres (31 mi) long and up to 13 km (8.1 mi) wide. The peninsula is administratively divided between Morocco (see Glossary) and Mauritania, with the Mauritanian port and railhead of Nouadhibou located on the eastern shore (see fig. 11). Dakhlet Nouadhibou, one of the largest natural harbors on the west coast of Africa, is 43 km (27 mi) long and 32 km (20 mi) wide at its broadest point. About 50 km (31 mi) southeast of RasNouadhibou is Arguin. In 1455 the first Portuguese installation south of Cape Bojador (in the present-day South Morocco) was established at Arguin. Farther south is the coastline's only significant promontory, 7 m (23 ft) high Cape Timiris. From this cape to the marshy area around the mouth of the Senegal River, the coast is regular and marked only by an occasional high dune.

On coastal dunes vegetation is rare. At the foot of ridges, however, large tamarisk bushes, dwarf acacias, and swallowworts may be found. Some high grass, mixed with balsam, spurge, and spiny shrubs, grows in the central region. The north has little vegetation.

== Climate ==
The Coastal Zone, or Sub-Canarian Zone, extends the length of the approximately 754 km-long Atlantic coast. Prevailing oceanic trade winds from the Canary Islands modify the influence of the harmattan, producing a humid but temperate climate. Rainfall here is minimal; in Nouadhibou it averages less than 30 mm annually and occurs between July and September. Temperatures are moderate, varying from mean maxima of 28 °C and 32 °C for Nouadhibou and Nouakchott, respectively, to mean minima of 16 °C and 19 °C.

== Geology ==
The depositional profile of the northern Banc d'Arguin describes a flat-topped platform, on which extensive carbonate deposits developed largely in water depths <10 m below sea level. Vast areas of the Banc d'Arguin are covered by mixed carbonate–siliciclastic sediments dominated by barnacles and mollusc remains plus admixed aeolian siliciclastics. These sediments accumulate into extensive shoals, resulting in water depths less than 5 m several dozen km off the present shoreline. The bank edge forms a sharp morphological step, suddenly deepening from 10–20 m down to 30–50 m, and separates the inner shelf environments (<5–10 m; carbonate bank) from those of the outer shelf. Assemblages formed by benthic foraminifers and molluscs and monospecific bivalve shell accumulations with admixed aeolian silt characterise the platform cover in the outer shelf.

In the central and southern outermost shelf, silt-sized quartzose materials form confined bodies referred to as the Arguin and Timiris Mud Wedges. These deposits started to form with transgressional inundation early in the Holocene and have grown continuously and rapidly over the past 9,000 years. Locally, the mud wedge deposits are incised by gullies and canyons towards the shelf break lying at around 80–110 m. The southernmost Golfe d'Arguin describes a homoclinal ramp profile with vast intertidal plains around Tidra Island.

== History ==
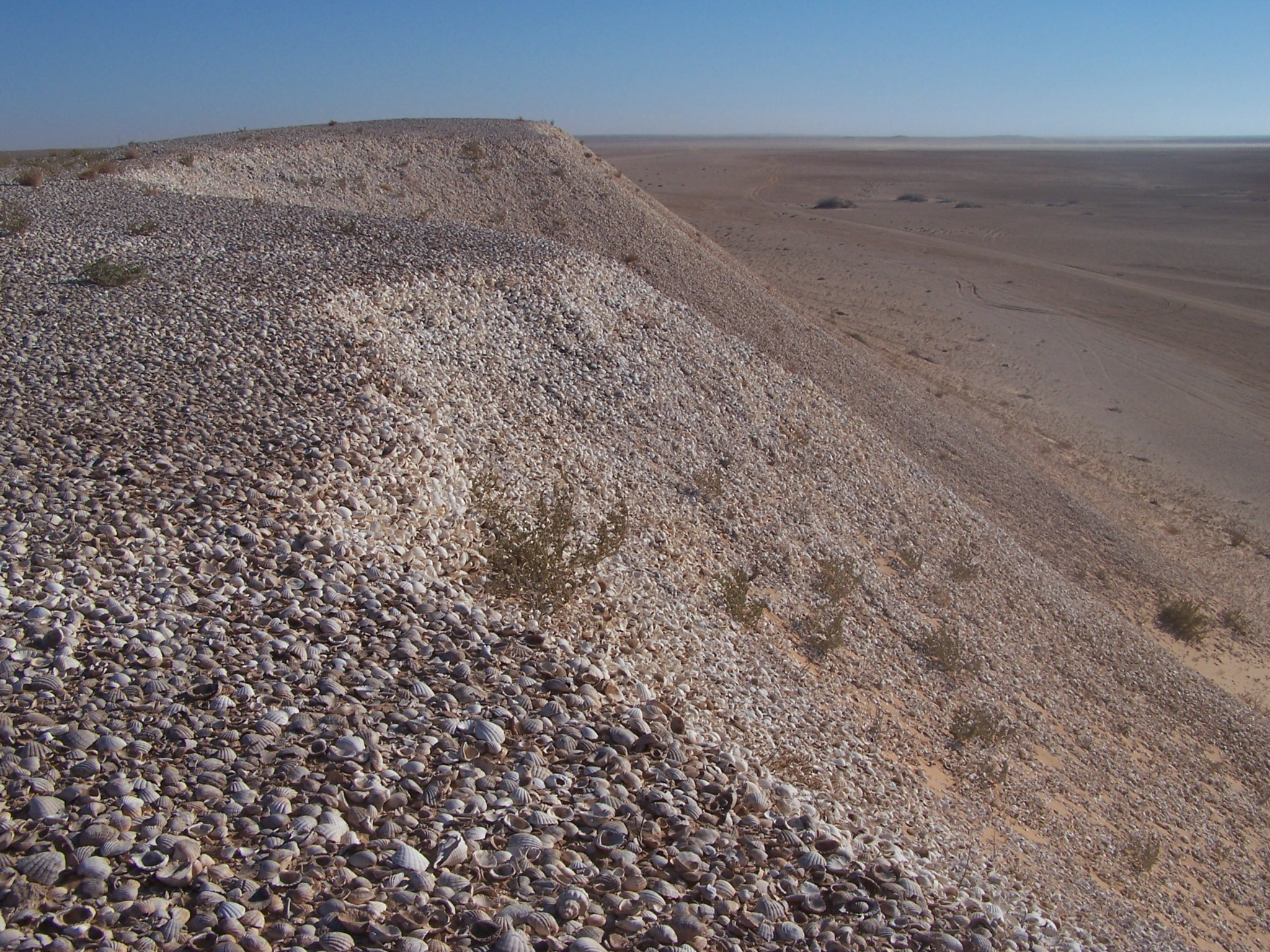
Shell midden several km long and tens of metres high proving an intense prehistoric use of the area

Because of its rich fishery and strategic location, the territory has been highly coveted and disputed by the European colonial powers of Portugal, France, England, Brandenberg/Prussia and Holland.

1445 – 5 February 1633	Portuguese rule (Arguim).
5 February 1633 – 1678	Dutch rule (brief English occupation in 1665).
1 September 1678 – September 1678	French occupation.
September 1678	Abandoned.
5 October 1685 – 7 March 1721	Brandenburg (from 1701, Prussian) rule.
7 March 1721 – 11 January 1722	French rule.
11 January 1722 – 20 February 1724	Dutch rule.
20 February 1724 – March 1728	French rule.

- The Wreck of Medusa – La Méduse was a French frigate that ran aground at high tide off Banc d'Arguin on 2 July 1816.
  A scene inspired by the account of survivors Alexandre Corréard and Jean-Baptiste-Henri Savigny was made the subject of a painting in 1819 by Théodore Géricault called "The Raft of the Medusa", which is displayed in the Louvre Museum in Paris, France.

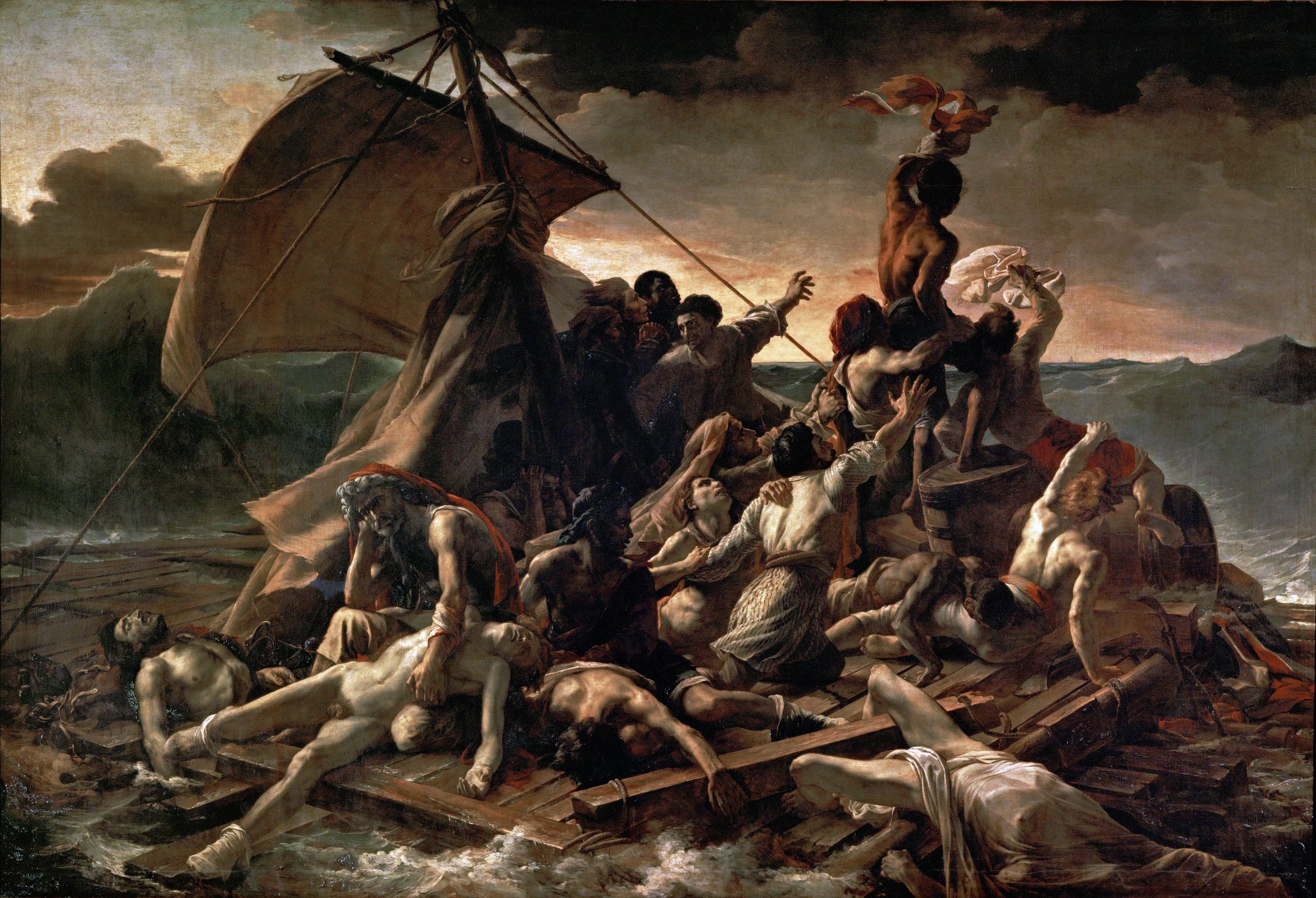
The Raft of the Medusa, Théodore Géricault

Despite the Almoravid domination of Spain in the eleventh and twelfth centuries, there seems to be little evidence of contact during that time between Mauritania and Europe. The inhospitable coastline of Mauritania continued to deter voyagers until the Portuguese began their African explorations in the fifteenth century. Lured by legends of vast wealth in interior kingdoms, the Portuguese established a trading fort at Arguin, southeast of Cap Blanc (present-day Ras Nouadhibou), in 1455. The king of Portugal also maintained a commercial agent at Ouadane in the Adrar in an attempt to divert gold traveling north by caravan. Having only slight success in their quest for gold, the Portuguese quickly adapted to dealing in slaves. In the mid-fifteenth century, as many as 1,000 slaves per year were exported from Arguin to Europe and to the Portuguese sugar plantations on the island of São Tomé in the Gulf of Guinea.

With the merger of the Portuguese and Spanish crowns in 1580, the Spaniards became the dominant influence along the coast. In 1638, however, they were replaced by the Dutch, who were the first to begin exploiting the gum arabic trade. Produced by the acacia trees of Trarza and Brakna and used in textile pattern printing, this gum arabic was considered superior to that previously obtained in Arabia. By 1678 the French had driven out the Dutch and established a permanent settlement at Saint Louis at the mouth of the Senegal River, where the French Company of the Senegal River (Compagnie Française du Sénégal) had been trading for more than fifty years.

The Moors, with whom the Europeans were trading, considered the constant rivalries between European powers a sign of weakness, and they quickly learned the benefits of playing one power against the other. For example, they agreed simultaneously to give monopolies to the French and the Dutch. The Maures also took advantage of the Europeans whenever possible, so that when the French negotiated with the amir of Trarza to secure a monopoly on the gum Arabic trade, the amir in exchange demanded a considerable number of gifts. Thus began the custom, an annual payment expected by the Maures for doing business with a government or a company. By 1763 the British had expelled France from the West African coast, and France recovered control only when the Congress of Vienna in 1815 granted French sovereignty over the coast of West Africa from Cap Blanc south to Senegal.

== See also ==
- Arguin Island
