= De Perier family =

French noble family

de Perier
- Argent, on a vert fess accompanied by four cinquefoils of the same set one on each canton of the shield
- Country: France
- Origin: Normandy
- Properties: Château de La Madeleine in Pressagny-l'Orgueilleux; Moros Manor in Concarneau

The de Perier family is a French lineage of naval and infantry officers from Le Havre in France. From the 17th century onwards, there were two branches, of which only the elder survives.

Notable members include Étienne de Perier (1686-1766), colonial governor of French Louisiana, grand-croix of Saint Louis and lieutenant général des armées navales; Antoine Alexis de Perier de Salvert (1691-1757) chef d'escadre, commander of Saint Louis, director of the Dépôt des cartes et plans de la Marine; Pierre-Étienne de Perier (1893-1968), divisional general and Grand Officer of the Legion of Honour.

== History ==
=== Origins ===
The Perier surname is common in France (ranked 1244th on the Filae website), and between 1891 and 1990 it was found mainly, in descending order, in Seine-Maritime, Manche, Île-de-France, Gironde and Isère. According to linguist Henri Moisy, the name Perier, with a single r, is the Norman form of the Low Latin "perarius", meaning a pear tree. The Perier surname preceded by a particle has been borne by several families, but only one remains.

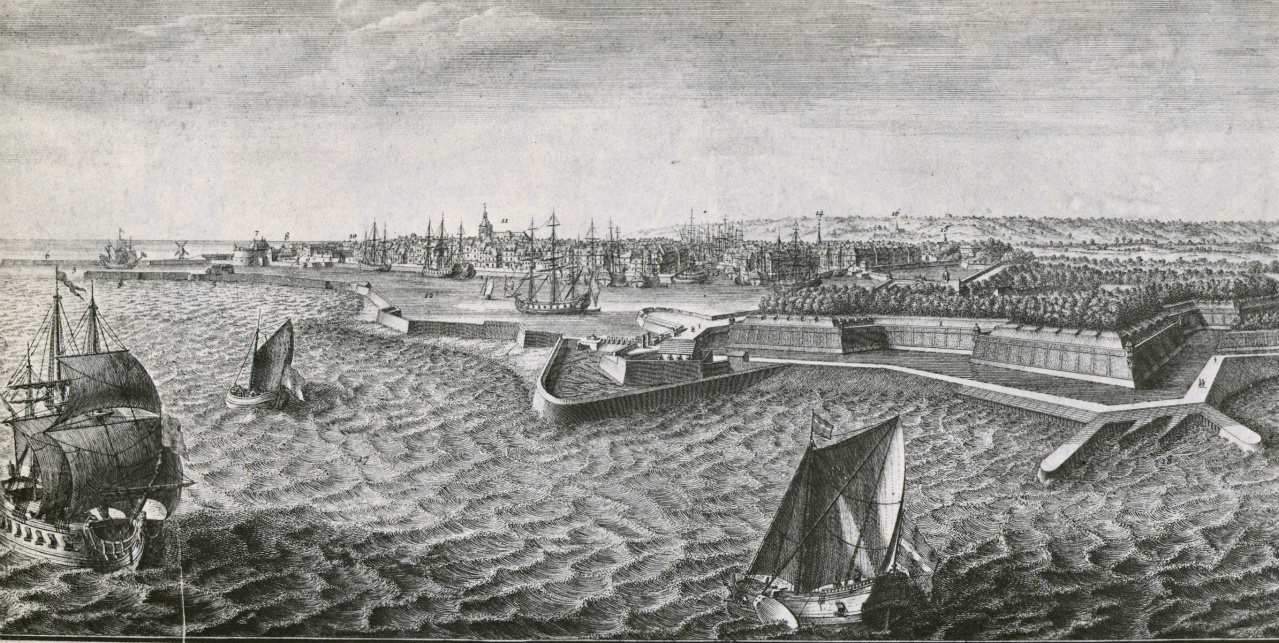
The port of Le Havre in 1740.

Le Havre in Normandy was founded in 1517 by Francis I as a military base, fishing port and shipyard. In the years that followed, there were several inhabitants called Perier. In The French nobility, Arnaud Clement wrote that the family's lineage goes back to David Perier and his wife Marie Beaufils, who died in Le Havre in 1644 and 1640 respectively. David was hoyman. The proven lineage thus begins in 1596, the birth date of their son Jean Perier (1596-1647), a ship's captain who had several sons, including: Jean (1620-1660), founder of the elder branch, and Étienne (1644-1726), founder of the younger branch. The two branches produced eight members of the Order of Saint-Louis and the same number of members of the Legion of Honour.

=== Elder branch ===
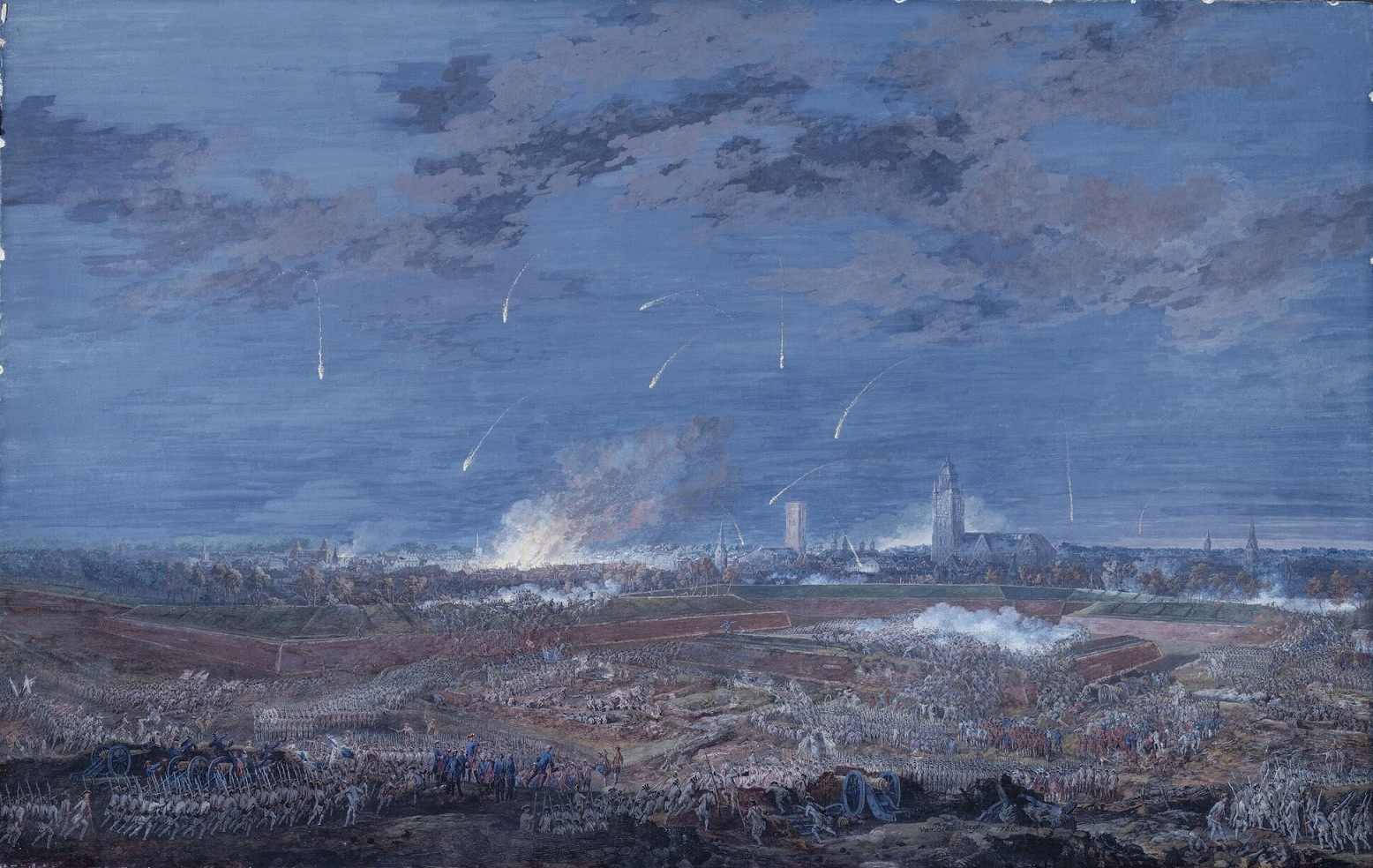
Siege of Bergen-op-Zoom (1747).

Second lieutenant in the Touraine regiment in 1734, Jean Perier du Petit Bois took part in the siege of Philippsburg. Having obtained the ranks of ensign (1736) and captain (1738), he was made a knight of Saint-Louis. In 1747, at the siege of Bergen-op-Zoom, he took part in the assault at the head of a company. His unit was wiped out and he was himself seriously wounded twice. Promoted to lieutenant colonel, he was awarded a sword of honour and died of his wounds in Le Havre in 1748. His brother, Pierre Étienne Perier du Petit Bois (1720-1780), captain of the coastguard militia, bought the position of treasurer general of the Navy and the Colonies in the Port and Department of Le Havre.

Antoine de Perier (1751-1844), son of the former, was an aspirant in the Royal Artillery Corps from 1768 to 1770, but was unable to enter for lack of a place. He then prepared for the entrance examinations for the Engineers and became a aspirant in this corps from 1770 to 1772. Unable to secure a place there either, he joined the provincial troops, in the Régiment de Blois (1773) and then the Régiement de Bresse (1776). In 1785, he served in Holland in the Maillebois Legion, but it was disbanded in 1786. Once again serving in the provincial troops, he temporarily withdrew from service during the French Revolution. First a lieutenant, then a captain in the Régiment de Turenne, he was arrested in 1793 because of the Law of Suspects during the Terror. Released after the fall of Robespierre in 1794, he was appointed colonel in 1797 and took command of the Rouen National Guard, with the support of an emissary from the Count of Provence, who was trying to rally his units to his cause. He lost his command during the coup of 18 Brumaire. During the Restoration, he offered to serve in the Swiss Guards, but his age led to his application being rejected. He died in 1844 at the home of his son René, in the Château de la Madeleine.

His son René (1800-1880) was briefly a bodyguard to Louis XVIII from 1818 to 1819 in the d'Havré company. He was mayor of Pressagny-l'Orgueilleux where he owned the château de la Madeleine from 1839 to 1864. His son, Léonor (1842-1908), enlisted as a rifleman at the age of 18 and became a colonel in the Foreign Legion and an officer of the Legion of Honour. His son, Pierre-Étienne (1893-1968), attained the rank of divisional general and the dignity of Grand Cross of the Legion of Honour.

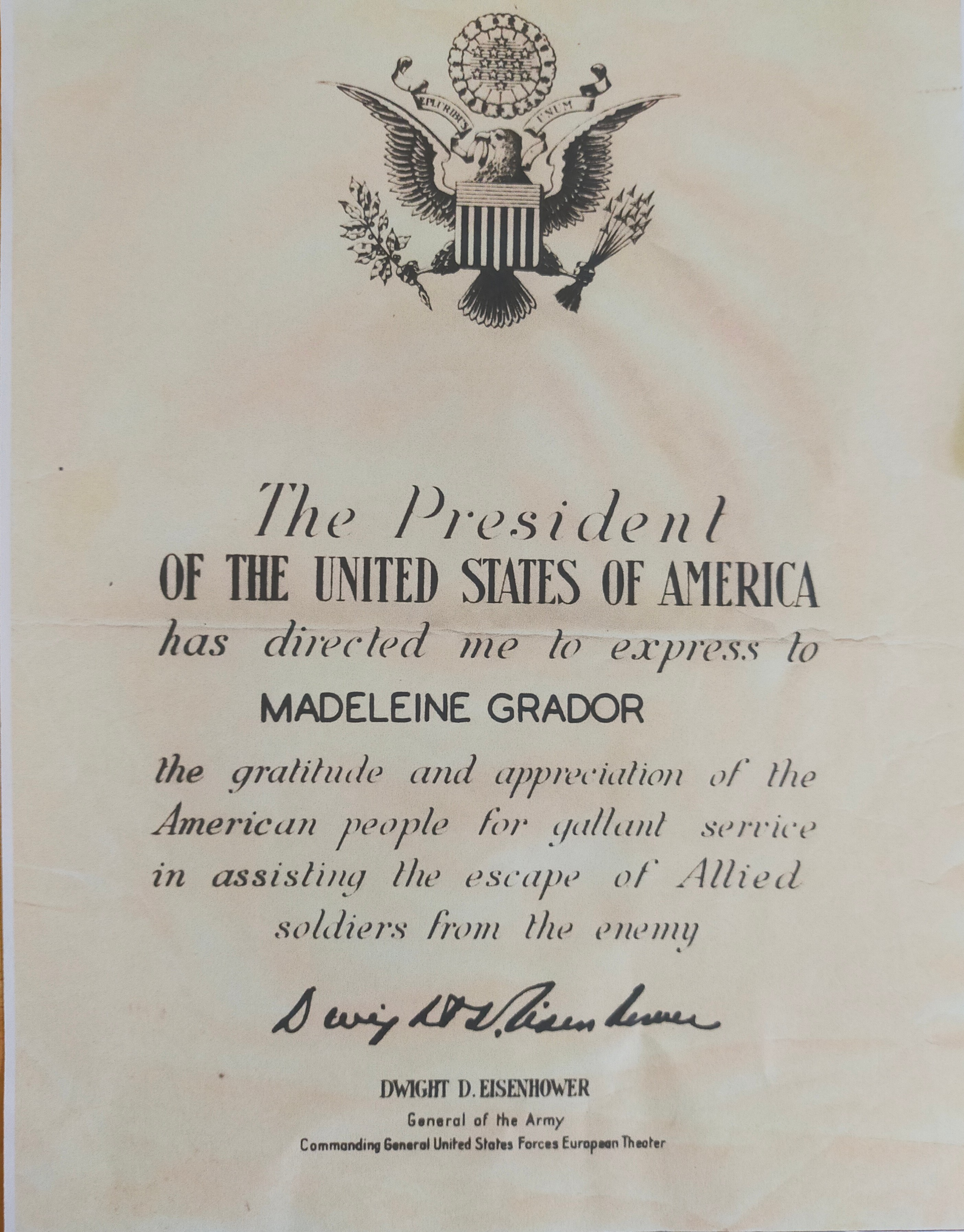
Certificate of resistance issued to Madeleine de Perier by Dwight D. Eisenhower.

Madeleine de Perier (1914-2009), wife of Pierre Grador, was a member of the Lyon-Carter network, which helped Allied airmen escape. Incarcerated in Fresnes prison, she was sentenced to death by the Nazis on 22 June 1944. The last convoy to the extermination camps, which she was to have been part of, was cancelled on 17 August thanks to the intervention of the Swedish consul, Nordling. The insurrection led to the liberation of Paris on 25 August, with the arrival of the Leclerc division and the Allies. The French Republic recognised her as a soldier without uniform in the Forces Françaises Combattantes who had taken part in the fight to liberate the homeland. Her conduct also earned her the congratulations of Dwight D. Eisenhower, who awarded her a certificate of gratitude and the Medal of Freedom.

=== Younger branch ===
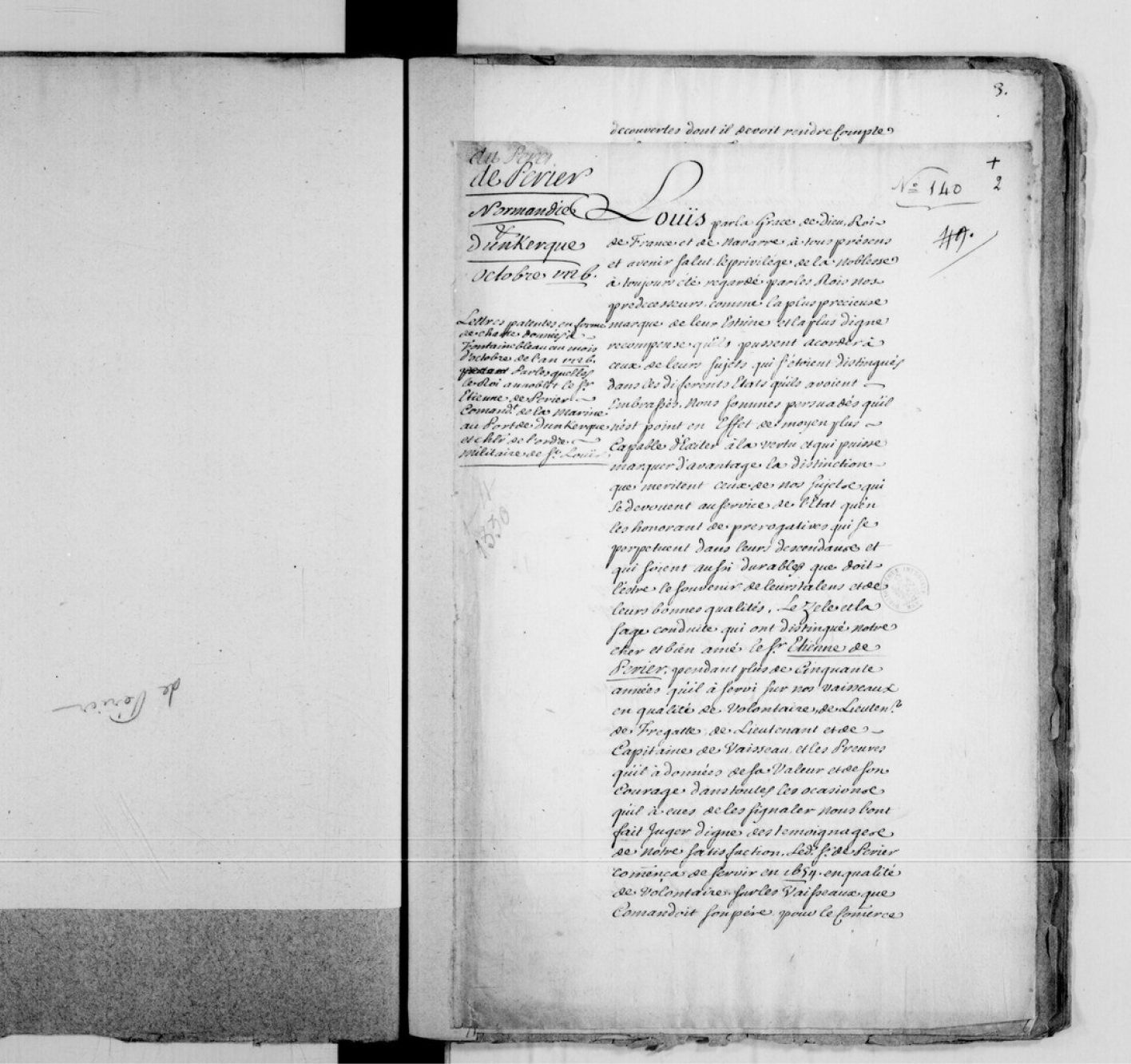
First page of the letters patent of nobility issued in 1726 to Étienne de Perier.

The younger branch continually produced naval officers from the seventeenth to the nineteenth centuries. In the seventeenth century, Étienne Perier, founder of this branch, distinguished himself in the fight against piracy. Taking part in all the wars of his time, he fought at Solebay, Texel, Cayenne and Tobago. He took control of many ships when they were boarded. In 1689, Perier was wounded when he blew up a 40-gun English coastguard. He ended his career as ship and port captain at Le Havre. In 1726, at the age of 82, he and his descendants were ennobled by letters patent from Louis XV. These refer to his "long and important service" and his long career of "more than fifty years as a volunteer, frigate lieutenant, naval officer and naval captain". He had several sons, two of whom distinguished themselves in the armed forces.

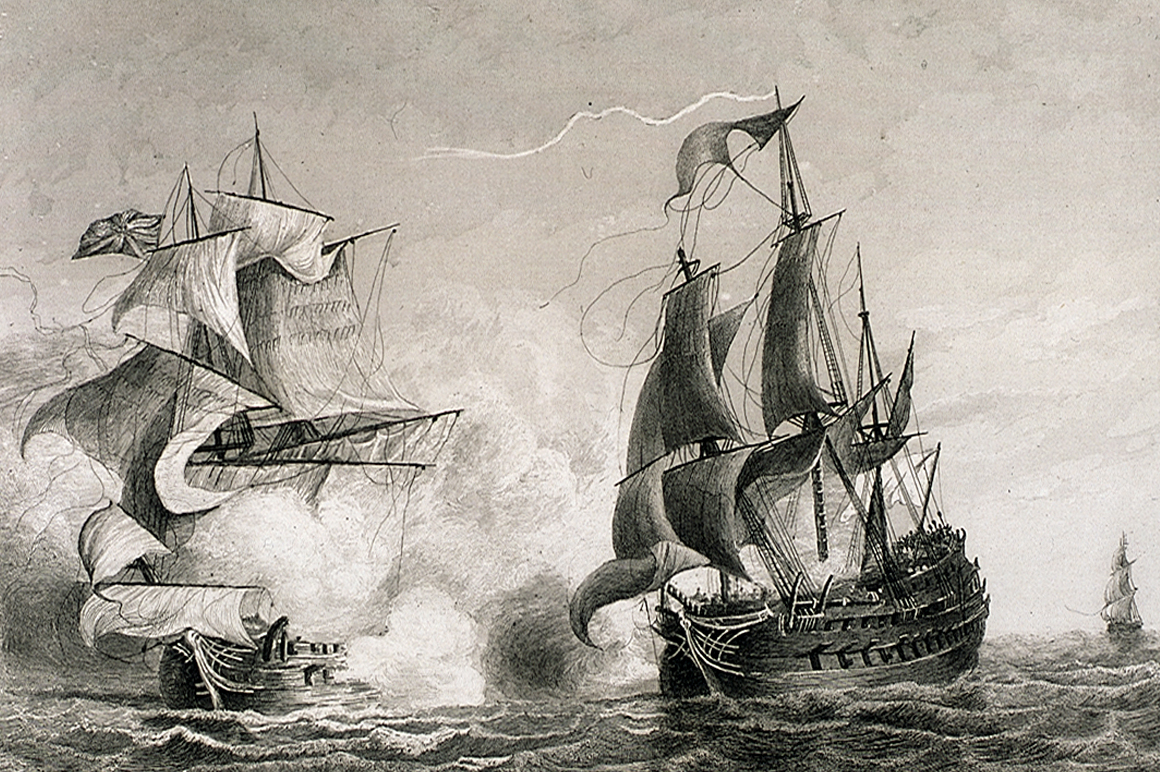
The action of 8 May 1744

His eldest son, Étienne de Perier (1686-1766) began his long career at the age of eight. Brian E. Coutts wrote that he embarked as a volunteer in 1695, and fought throughout the War of the Spanish Succession. He boarded several ships and was shot twice. Captured in 1711, he was released on condition that he would no longer serve at sea. A naval gunner at Valenciennes, he took part in the defence of Le Quesnoy, which was besieged by the Imperials in 1712. Wounded during the bombardment, he was captured again. Returning to sea service in 1714, he joined the French East India Company in 1720. During a campaign in Chile, his squadron suffered a famine. He was sent ashore with 50 men to find the necessary supplies. Fighting successfully against the 800 Spanish soldiers, he supported "several vigorous actions" which enabled him to ensure the "salvation of the Company's merchant vessels". Having taken the fortress of Arguin in 1721, he was sent to India in 1724 to protect the Mahé trading post, which was under siege from the Prince of Malabar. As colonial governor of French Louisiana from 1727 to 1733, he carried out numerous projects to improve the colony. When the Natchez Revolt broke out in 1729, he mounted a punitive expedition with his brother's reinforcements. Having returned to sea service, he embarked on the Mars and distinguished himself in action of 8 May 1744 by capturing the HMS Northumberland, after a very violent 9-hour battle. Perier retired from the service in 1757, after a final campaign in the West Indies in 1756, where he lost a son and a son-in-law. Raised to the rank of lieutenant général des Armées navales in 1757, he was awarded the Grand Cross of Saint-Louis in 1765. He died at the Château de Tréoudal in Saint-Martin-des-Champs in 1766. Perier the Elder had several sons, including Étienne Louis de Perier (1720-1756), lieutenant and knight of Saint-Louis, and Antoine Louis de Perier de Monplaisir (1728-1759), who drowned the day after the Battle of Quiberon Bay in the sinking of the Juste.

His youngest son, Antoine Alexis de Perier de Salvert (1691-1757), also distinguished himself in the navy. Raymond de Bertrand wrote that he enlisted in 1701. Perier de Salvert took part in numerous battles against pirates and boarded several ships. He distinguished himself in 1721 and 1724 by twice taking the fortress of Arguin from the Dutch in Mauritania. Second in command of the expedition against the Natchez in Louisiana in 1731, he led two expeditions in 1745 and 1755 to protect Louisbourg in New France against English forces. As squadron leader, commander of Saint-Louis and director of the Dépôt des cartes et plans de la Marine, he died in Versailles in 1757. He had several sons, two of whom distinguished themselves.

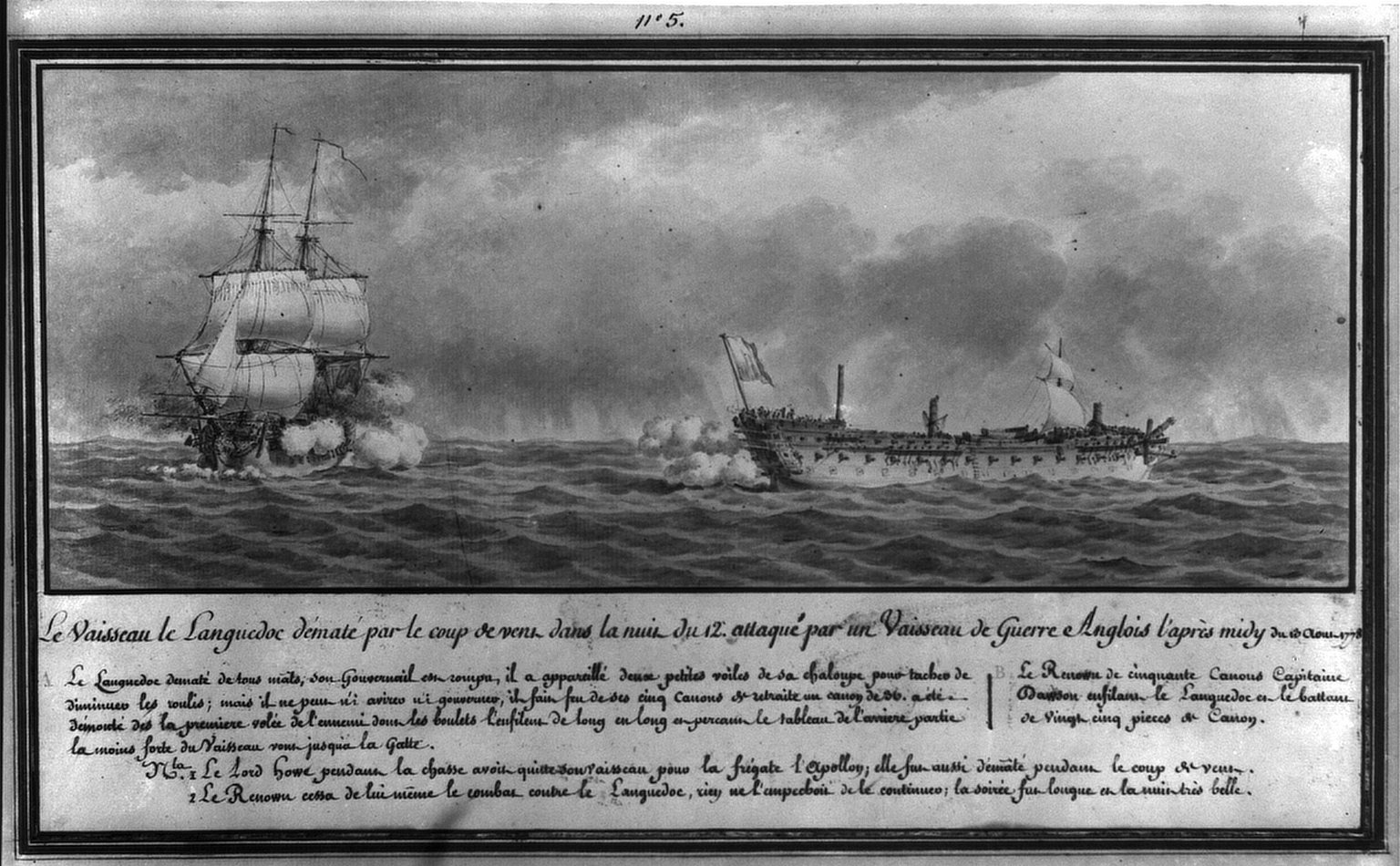
The Languedoc, attacked by the HMS Renown, 13 August 1778

The first one, Louis Alexis de Perier de Salvert (1730-1803), count of Salvert, took part in the Duc d'Anville expedition (1746), the Battle of Minorca (1756), the Battle of Lagos (1759) and the Battle of 23 October 1762, the final maritime confrontation of the Seven Years' War. During the American Revolutionary War, Perier de Salvert was second in command of the Languedoc (1778), the flagship of d'Estaing's squadron. Under his command, he took part in all the battles against the English: the Battle of Rhode Island, the Battle of Saint Lucia, the Battle of Grenada and the Siege of Savannah. As chef d'escadre and knight of Saint-Louis, Louis XVI appointed him a member of the Society of the Cincinnati, created by Washington to reward soldiers who had distinguished themselves during the conflict. Louis Alexis's son François de Perier de Salvert (1764-1834), count of Salvert, was a ship's captain and harbourmaster at Pointe-à-Pitre in Guadeloupe. He was held as a prisoner on parole at Leek, Staffordshire, from 1803 to 1814. François had a son, Charles de Perier de Salvert, a judge of peace who died in Basse-Terre in 1904. The name de Perier de Salvert became extinct in 2018 in Guadaloupe with its descendant Mathilde de Perier de Salvert who had a son from his marriage in 1960.

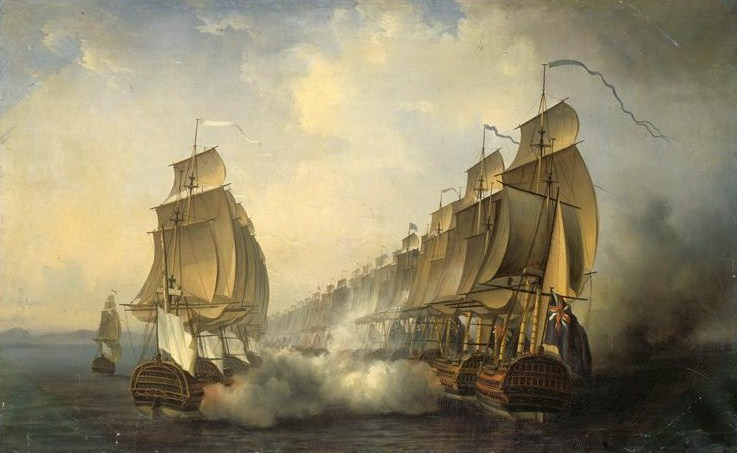
Battle of Cuddalore, Auguste Jugelet.

The second one, Éléonor Jacques Perier de Salvert (1748-1783), a lieutenant and knight of Saint-Louis, founded several Masonic lodges, including The Triple Hope in Port Louis. A deputy member of the Académie de Marine, he left several poems and plays in verse, including Le Passage de la Ligne. He was killed by an English cannonball at the Battle of Cuddalore in 1783.

== Line of descent ==
Simplified filiation of the de Perier family:

- David Perier († 1644), hoyman in Le Havre, married Marie Beaufils († 1640)
  - Jean Perier (1596-1647), ship's captain, married at first (1615) to Anne Duval († after 1623), daughter of Philippe Duval, maître de heux and Jeanne Huraud, and at second (1632) to Anne Le Dentu (1613-1645), daughter of Jehan Le Dentu, bourgeois of Le Havre, and Marie Thomas
    - Jean Perier (1620-1660), waxmaker and candlestick maker in Le Havre, married in 1648 to Marguerite Melun (1624-1688), daughter of Pierre Melun, baker, and Jeanne Roze
      - Pierre Perier (1654-ca. 1690), ship's captain, married in 1678 to Marie Marguerite Gohon, daughter of Étienne Gohon, cloth merchant and captain of the quartenier, and Guillaumette Estiemble
        - Jean Perier (1679-1726), King's Counselor, Lieutenant General of the Admiralty of Le Havre and Harfleur, churchwarden of Saint-François
        - Pierre Perier du Petit Bois (1688-1729), captain of merchant ships, married for the first time (1714) to Marie Anne Le Prestre (1691 - after 1715), daughter of Jacques Le Prestre, captain quartermaster, and Marie Anne Ricoeur, and for the second time (1719) to Suzanne Louvet (1689 - after 1730), daughter of Guillaume Louvet, quartermaster, and Marie Catherine du Butin
          - Jean Perier du Petit Bois (1715-1748), captain in the Touraine regiment and knight of Saint-Louis, died of wounds sustained at the siege of Berg-op-Zoom
            - Pierre Étienne Perier du Petit Bois (1720-1780), lawyer at the Normandy Parliament, coastguard captain, general treasurer of the Navy and Colonies in Le Havre, churchwarden of Saint-François, married in 1748 to Marie Anne Henriette Morin d'Oudalle (1727 - after 1760), daughter of Jean Gabriel Morin, merchant, and Catherine Françoise Bouëtte
              - Antoine de Perier (1751-1844), colonel of the first brigade of the Rouen National Guard, married in 1797 to Éléonore Le Tellier de Brothonne (1762-1835), daughter of Mathieu Le Tellier de Brothonne and Marie Le Roy
                - René de Perier (1800-1880), bodyguard to Louis XVIII, author, mayor of Pressagny-l'Orgueilleux, châtelain de la Madeleine, bibliophile, married Marie Bassompierre Sewrin in 1839, daughter of Charles Augustin Bassompierre Sewrin, author, goguettier and secrétaire général archiviste des Invalides, and Louise des Acres de l'Aigle.
                  - Léonor de Perier (1842-1908), infantry colonel and officer of the Légion d'honneur, married in 1886 to Louise Loubère (1862-1939), daughter of Jean-Louis Loubère, infantry colonel and governor of French Guyana, and Marie Masson de Longpré
                    - Pierre-Étienne de Perier (1893-1968), Major General and Grand Officer of the Legion of Honor.
                      - Remaining descendants
            - Pierre René Éléonor de Perier (1760-1788), second lieutenant in the Bresse regiment
    - Étienne Perier (1644-1726), ship's captain commanding the port of Le Havre and chevalier de Saint-Louis, knighted with his descendants in 1726, married in 1684 to Marie de Launay († 1693), daughter of Michel de Launay, sieur de Salvert, and Marguerite Le Run
      - Étienne de Perier (1686-1766), governor of Louisiana, lieutenant-general of the naval armies and grand-croix de Saint-Louis, married in 1719 Catherine Le Chibelier (1691-1756), widow of ship's lieutenant Chambellan de Graton, daughter of Jean Le Chibelier, mayor of Le Havre and treasurer of Notre-Dame, and Louise Le Maistre.
        - Étienne Louis de Perier (1720-1756), lieutenant and chevalier de Saint-Louis
        - Antoine Louis de Perier de Monplaisir (1728-1759), lieutenant de vaisseau killed the day after the Battle of Les Cardinaux, married in 1756 to Élisabeth Marie de Perreau (1736-1806), daughter of Jean Perreau and Marie Joly
      - Antoine Alexis de Perier de Salvert (1691-1757), squadron leader and commander of Saint-Louis, married for the first time (1716) to Marie de Piotard (ca. 1691 - 1739), and for the second time (1739) to Angélique Rosalie de Laduz (1713-1786), daughter of Jacques de La Duz, captain general of the Vannes coastguard, and Marie Thérèse Fenouil
        - Antoine François de Perier de Moros (1723-1768), lieutenant in the Navy
        - Louis Alexis de Perier de Salvert (1730-1803), squadron leader, chevalier de Saint-Louis and member of the Society of the Cincinnati, married in 1758 Catherine François de Gervais, daughter of François de Gervais, provost general of the Navy in Toulon, and Thérèse Lamanoird
          - François de Perier de Salvert (1764-1834), ship and port captain at Pointe-à-Pitre, chevalier de Saint-Louis, married in 1814 Ellen Goostry (1782-1846), daughter of Jean Goostry and Ellen Lightfoot
            - Charles de Perier de Salvert (1818-1904), justice of the peace in Basse-Terre
              - Victor de Perier de Salvert (1864-1944), typographer at the government printing works in Guadeloupe, married for the first time in 1894 to Marie Joséphine Amélie Daucourt (1851-), then for the second time to Edith Charlesin (1900-1974)
                - Mathilde de Perier de Salvert (1938-2018), teacher. In 1960 she married Mathieu Justin Ladire from whom who she had a son Max Ladire born in 1960, then in 1985 she married Pierre Louazel (1941-1993). She is the last member of the younger branch.
              - Eugène de Perier de Salvert (1865-after 1920), tax controller in Guadeloupe. Through successive relationships with Joséphine William (ca. 1875-before 1914), Marie Sophie Thérèse Augustine Augustin (1870-1956) and Joséphine Souprayen, he had five children.
        - Éléonor Jacques Marie Stanislas Perier de Salvert (1748-1783), lieutenant de vaisseau, chevalier de Saint-Louis, high-ranking freemason, writer and member of the Académie de marine, killed at the battle of Gondelour, married in 1773 Pauline Bigot de Morogues, daughter of Sébastien-François Bigot de Morogues, lieutenant general of the naval armies and founder of the Académie de marine, and Marie Bodineau

== Notable members ==
- Étienne Perier (1644-1726), captain of a ship and harbourmaster of Le Havre, knight of Saint-Louis, ennobled in 1726.
- Étienne de Perier, known as "Perier the Elder" (1686-1766) colonial governor of French Louisiana, lieutenant général des Armées navales and Grand Cross of Saint-Louis.
- Antoine Alexis de Perier de Salvert, known as "Perier the Younger" (1691-1757), lord of Moros, chef d'escadre, director of the Naval Maps and Plans Depot and Commander of Saint-Louis59.
- Louis Alexis de Perier de Salvert (1730-1803), chef d'escadre, lord of Moros, knight of Saint-Louis and member of the Society of the Cincinnati.
- Éléonor Jacques Marie Stanislas Perier de Salvert (1748-1783), lieutenant, member of the Académie de Marine, writer, knight of Saint-Louis and senior freemason, founder of The Triple Hope lodge in Port-Louis.
- Pierre-Étienne de Perier (1893-1968), divisional general and Grand Officer of the Legion of Honour.
- Madeleine de Perier (1914-2009), resistant, member of the Lyon-Carter network and holder of the Medal of Freedom.

== Portrait gallery ==
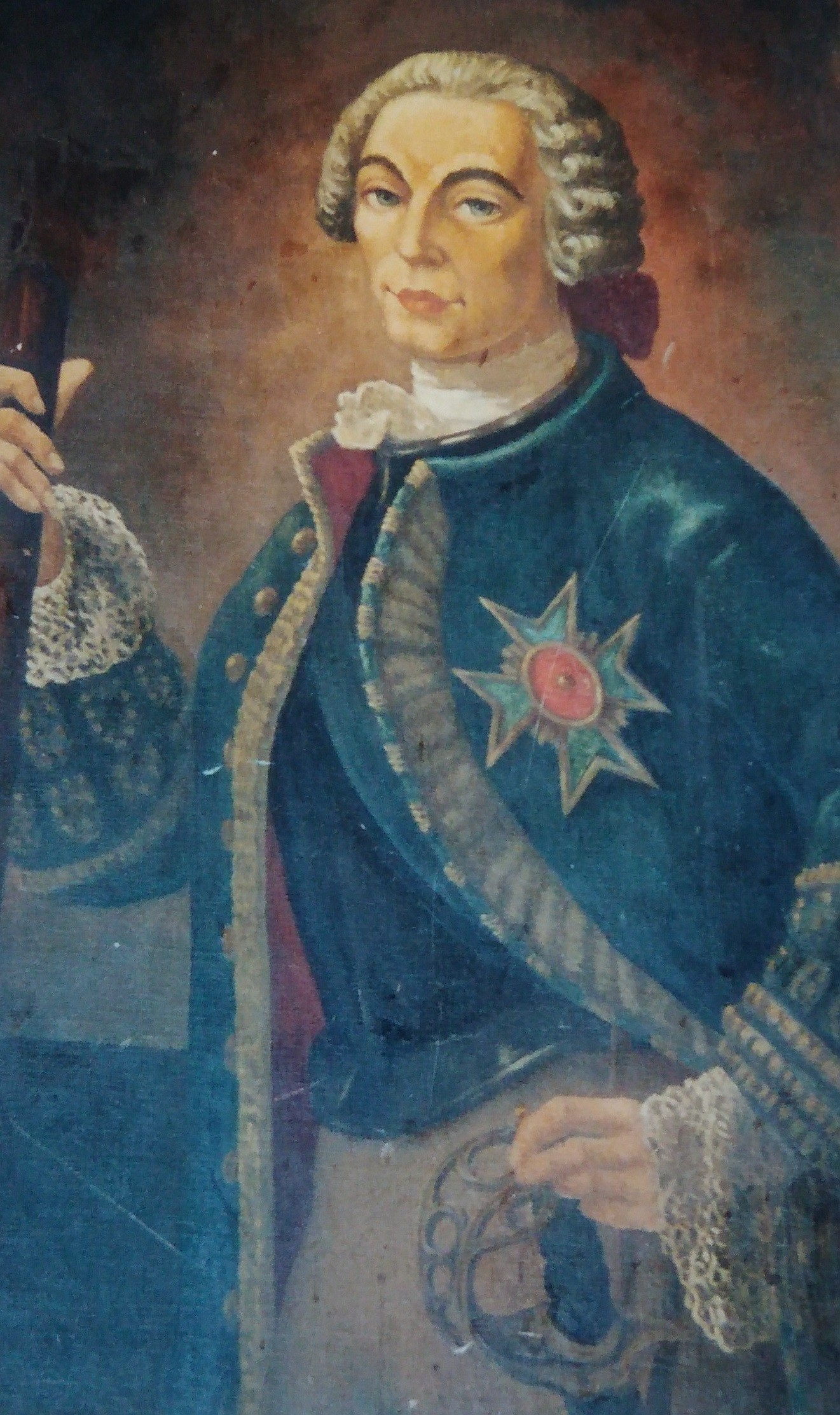
Posthumous portrait of Étienne de Perier (1686-1766)

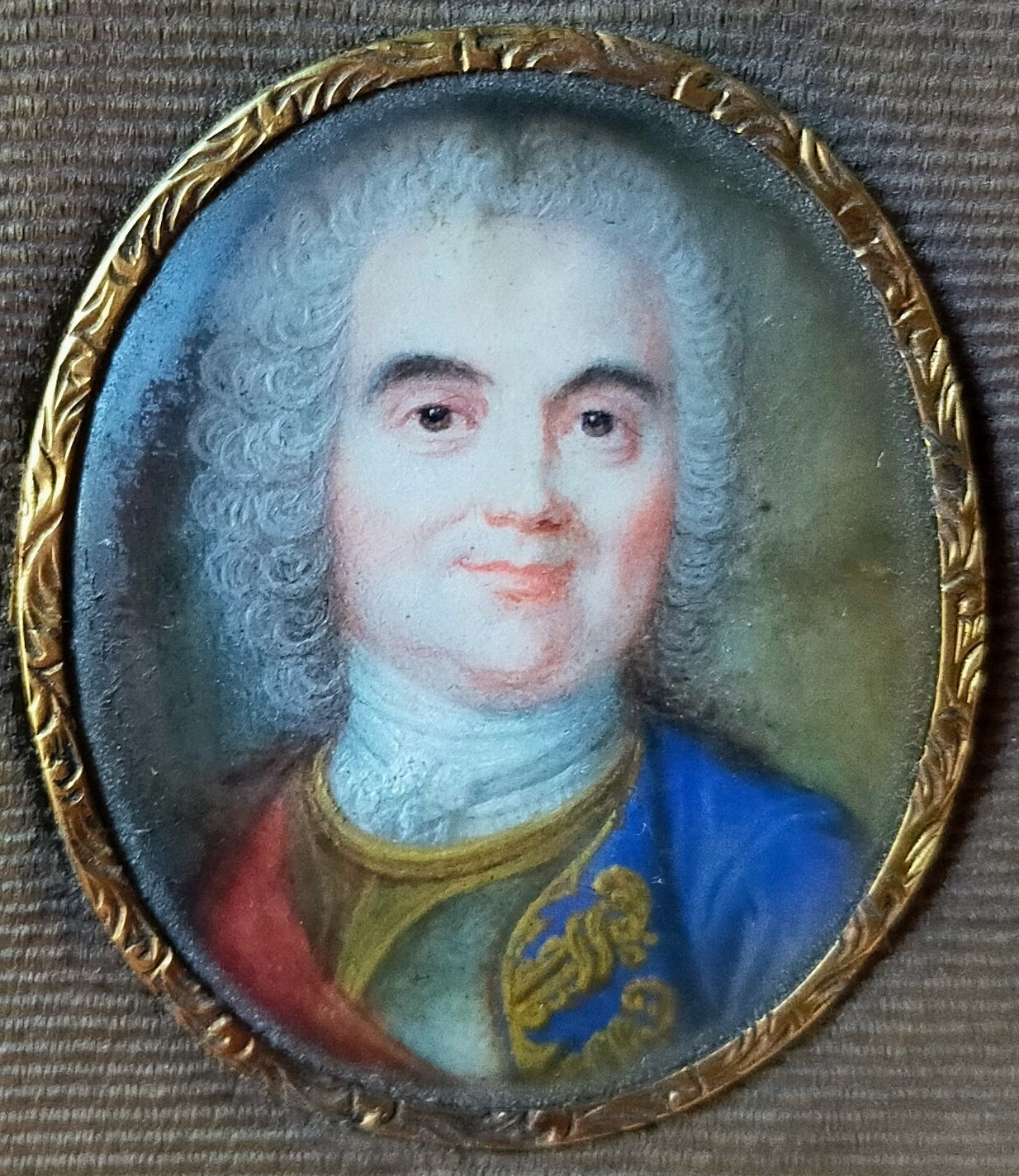
Antoine Alexis Perier de Salvert (1691-1757), in 1756 or 1757.

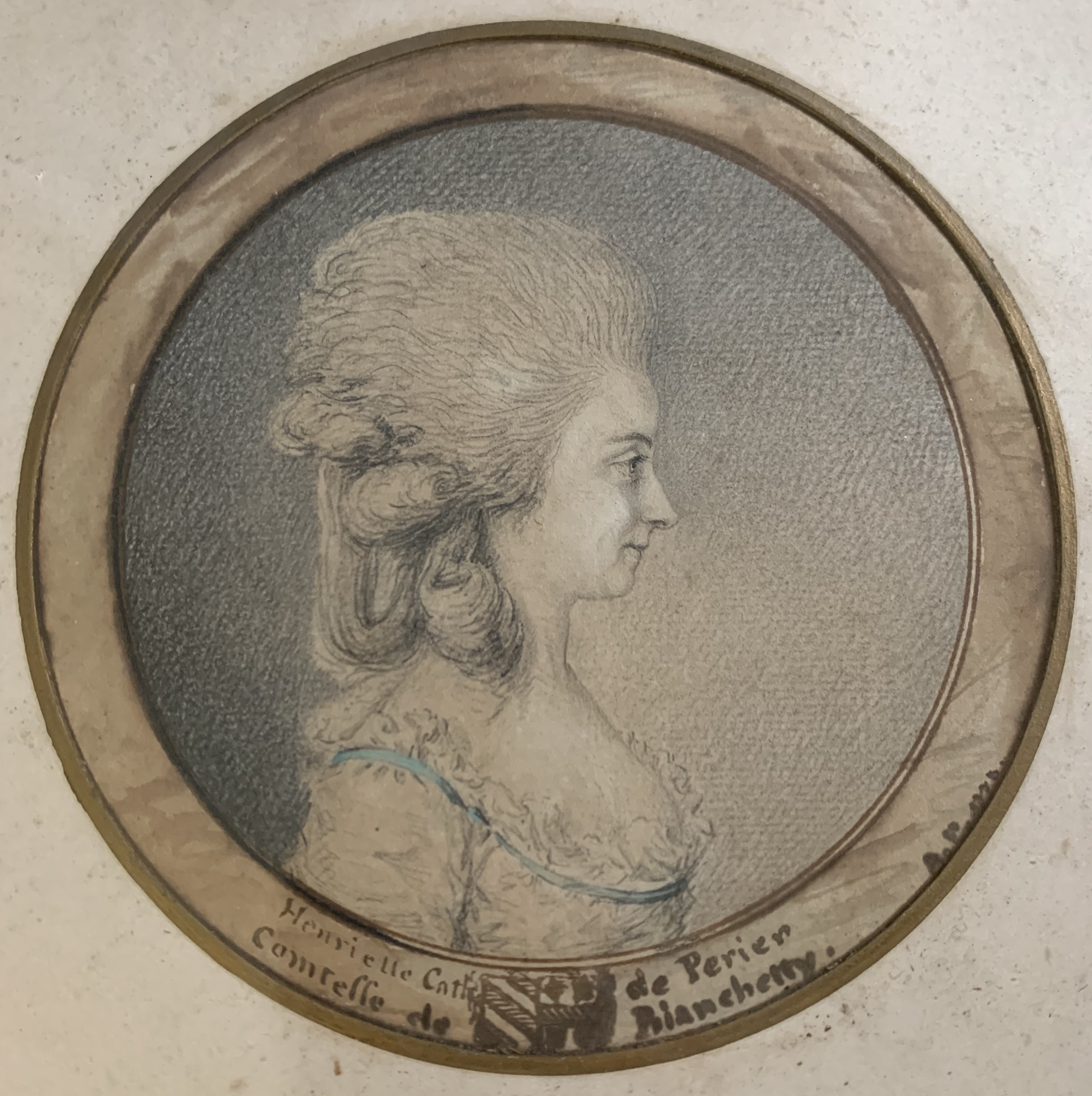
Henriette Catherine de Perier (1749-1823) countess of Blanchetti, in 1775.

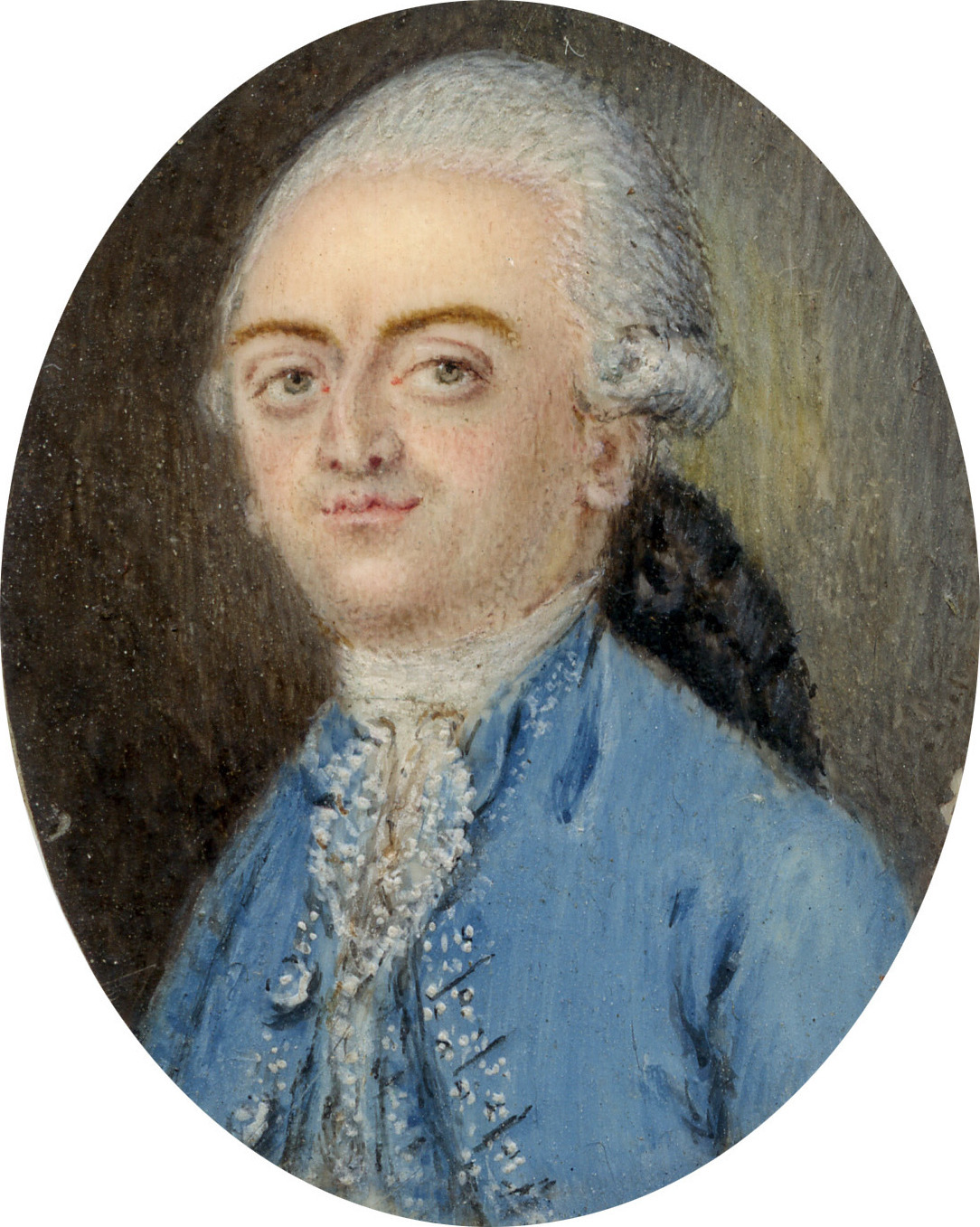
Antoine de Perier (1751-1844), around 1800.

== Properties and legacy ==
The Perier owned the following properties:

- Monplaisir plantation in McDonoghville (1727-1737).
- Moros manor, in Concarneau (1728-1795).
- Château de la Madeleine (1839-1864), in Pressagny-l'Orgueilleux.
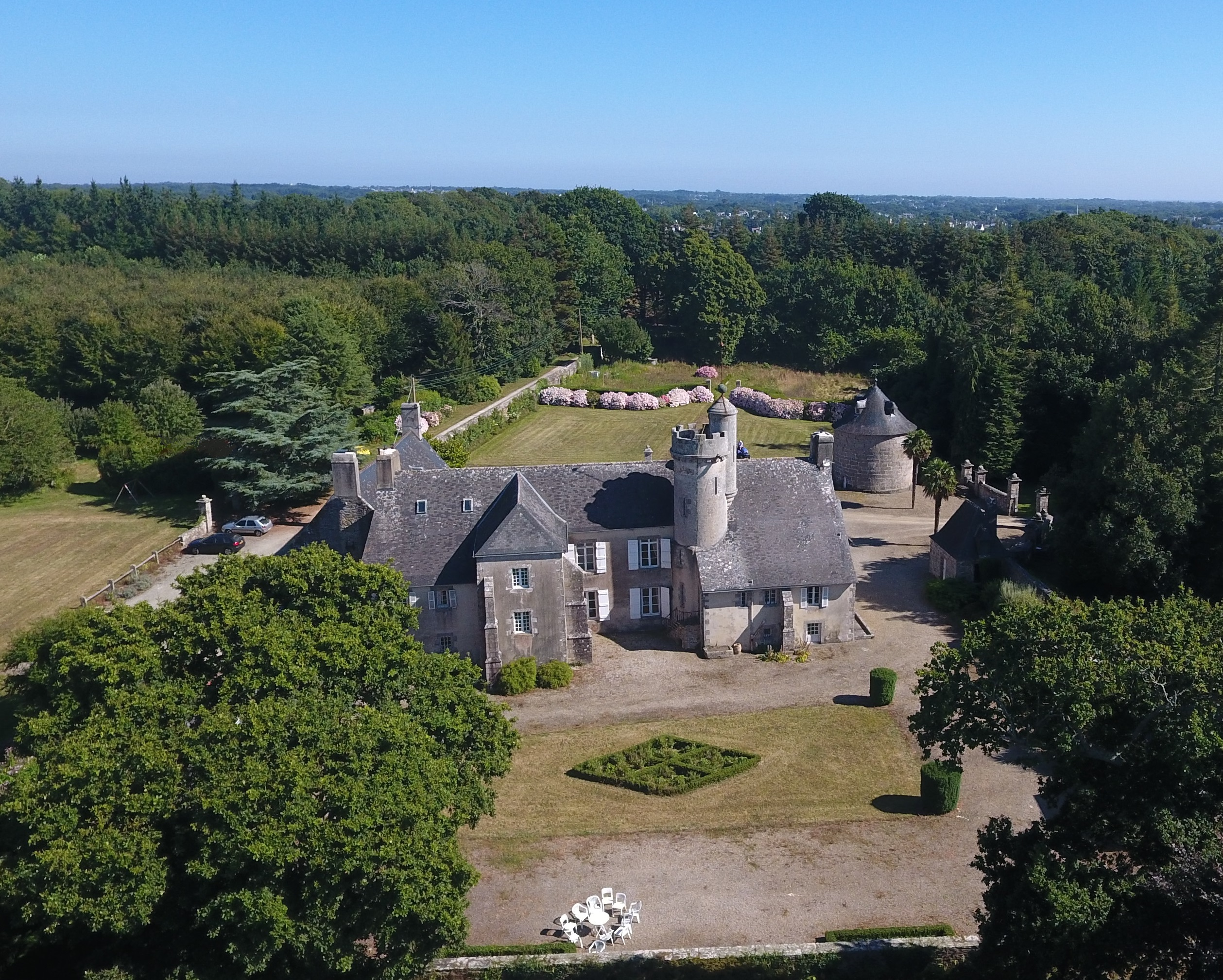
Moros manor.

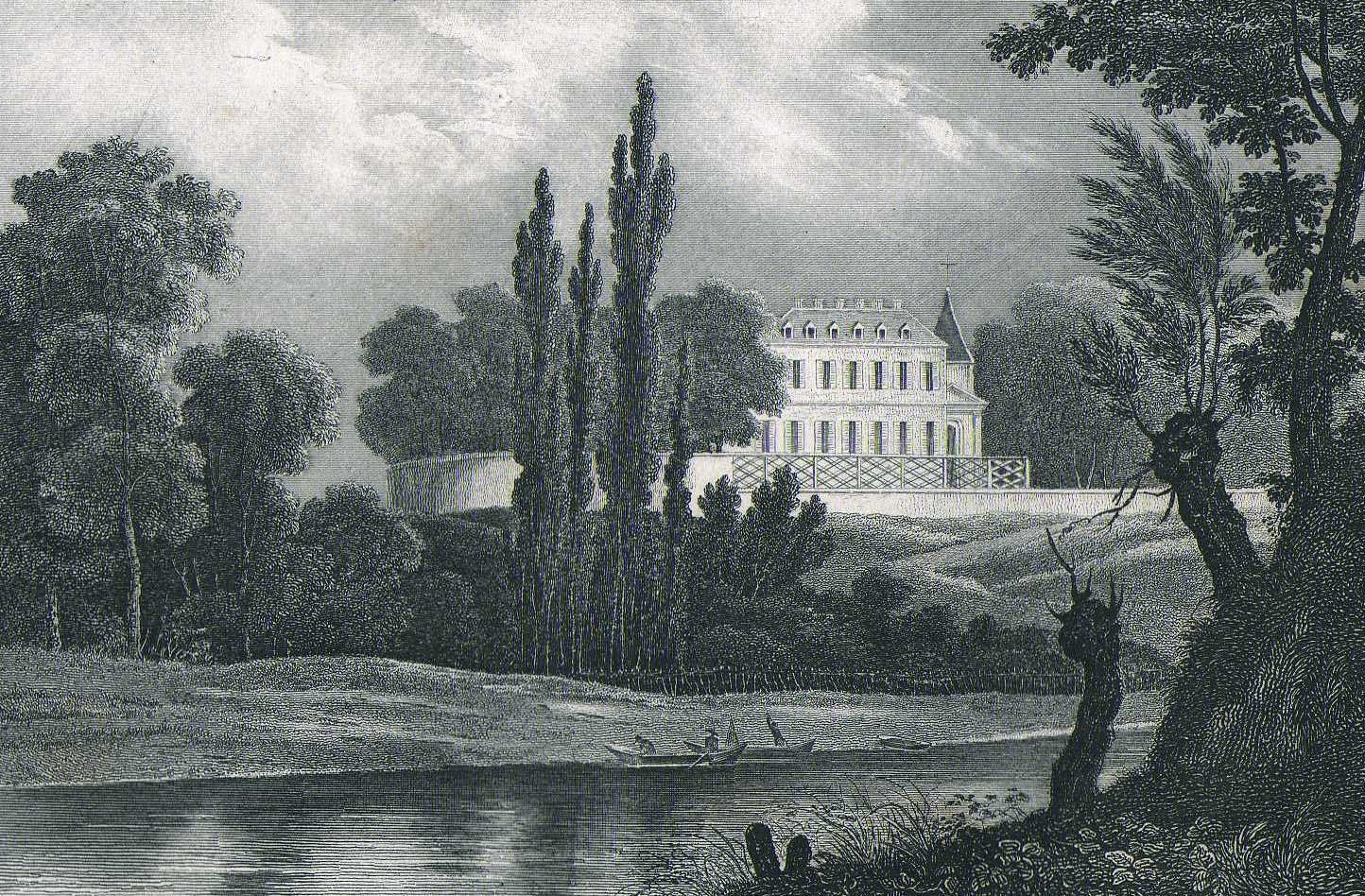
Château de la Madeleine in the 19th century.

This family left a number of memorabilia for posterity:

- In New Orleans, Louisiana: a street called Perrier St and a Maison Perrier hotel on the same street were inaugurated in 1890 and 1892, in reference to Étienne de Perier (1687-1766), governor of French Louisiana from 1726 to 1733.

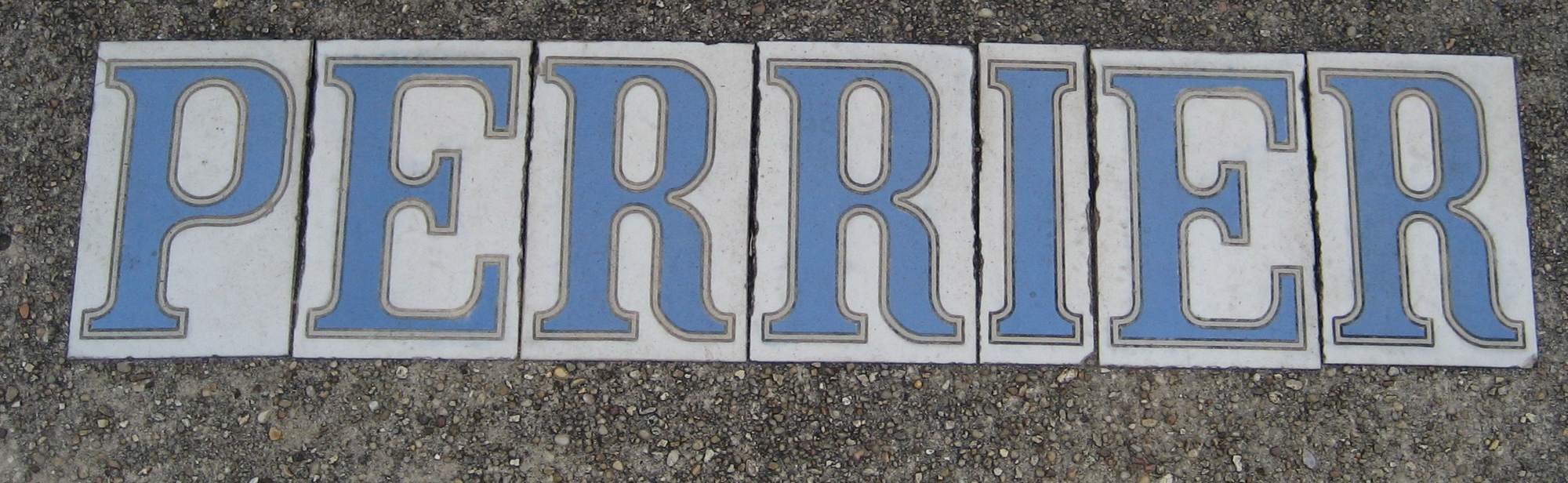
Perrier St.

- In Saint-Denis, Réunion: founded in 1958, a Masonic temple belonging to the Friendship lodge of the Grand Orient de France bears the name Éléonore Perier de Salvert, in reference to Éléonor Jacques Marie Stanislas Perier de Salvert (1748-1783), a Sovereign Prince Rose Croix and founder of the Triple Hope lodge in Mauritius.

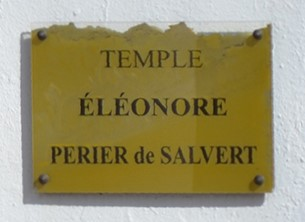
Commemorative plaque Jacques de Perier de Salvert

== Coats of arms ==
- Coat of arms: Argent, on a fess vert between four cinquefoils vert, one in each canton of the shield.
- Motto (of the eldest branch): Dextera Domini fecit virtutem (The right hand of the Lord has shown strength), Psalm 117.

== Alliances ==
The main alliances of the de Perier family are: Duval (1615), Le Dentu (1632), Boissaye du Bocage (1661), de Launay (1684), Le Chibelier (1719), de Piotard (1729), de Laduz (1739), Morin d'Oudalle (1748), du Plessis de Tréoudal (1755), de Perreau (1756), de Gervais (1758), Bigot de Morogues (1773), de Blanchetti (1773), Le Tellier de Brothonne (1797), Le Hayer de Bimorel (1818), du Lièpvre du Bois de Pacé (1834 and 1842), Bassompierre Sewrin (1839), Barré de Saint-Venant (1897), de Place (1921), Berthe de Pommery (1928), etc.

== Resources ==
=== Bibliography ===
- Henri Jougla de Morenas and Raoul de Warren, Grand armorial of France, volume 7, Société du Grand armorial de France, 1934-1952, p. 413.
- Émile Salomon, "Une famille de marins sous l'ancien régime: les Perrier de Salvert", La Nouvelle Revue Héraldique, Historique et Archéologique, second year, no. 12, December 1918, pp. 137–140.
- Étienne Taillemite, Dictionnaire des marins français, Tallandier, May 2002, p. 414 and 415.
- Étienne de Séréville, Dictionnaire de la noblesse française, 1975-1977, p. 785.
- Régis Valette, Catalogue de la noblesse française, Paris, Robert Laffont, 1989, p. 153.
- Michel Vergé-Franceschi, "Les Officiers de vaisseaux issus de la Compagnie des Indes: l'exemple des frères Périer", in Les flottes des Compagnies des Indes 1600-1857, Service historique de la Marine, Vincennes-Portsmouth, 1996.

=== Related articles ===
- Étienne Perier (governor)
- Antoine-Alexis Perier de Salvert
- Éléonor Jacques Marie Stanislas Perier de Salvert
- Pierre-Étienne de Perier
