= Étienne Perier (governor) =

Colonial governor of French Louisiana (1727-1733)

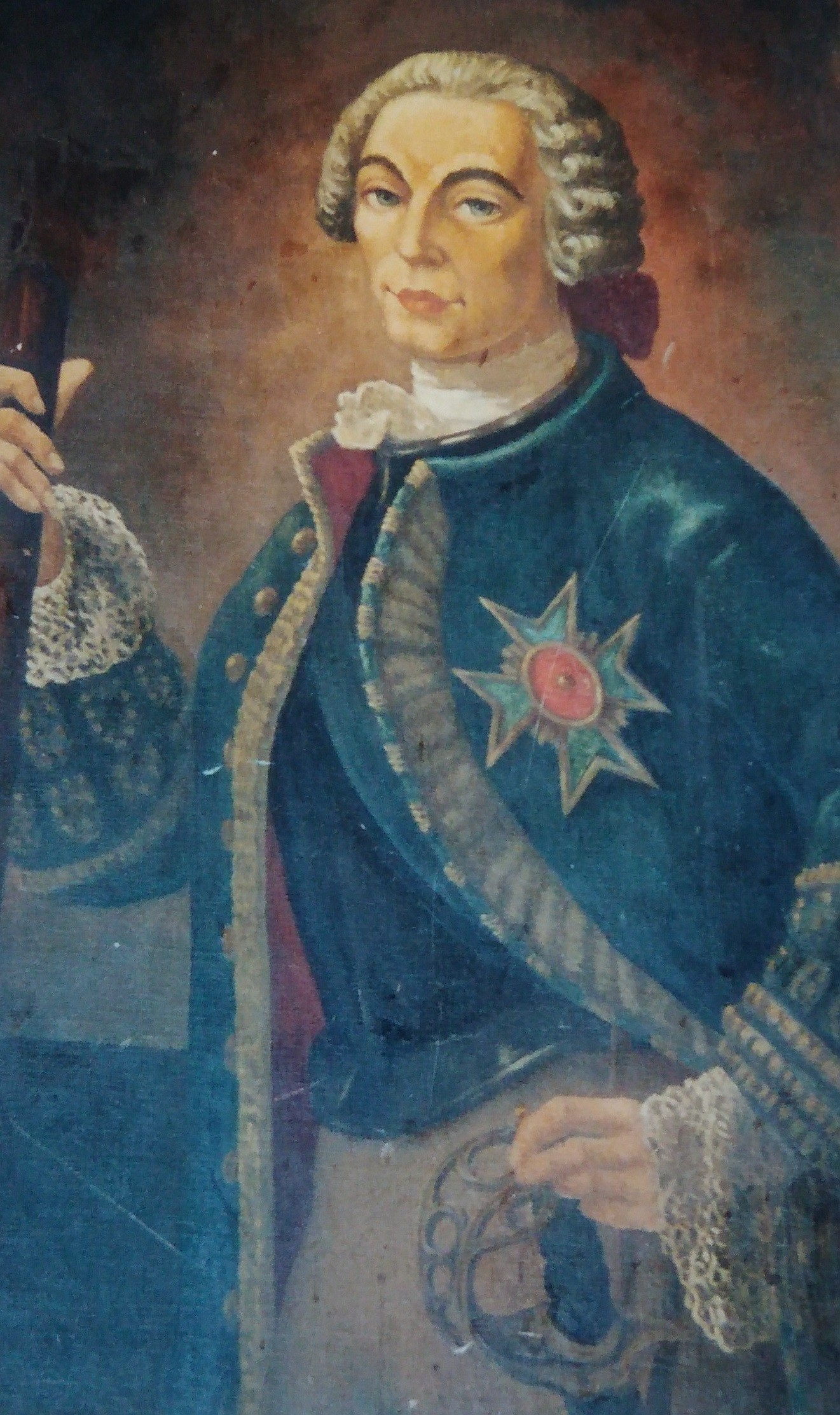
- Posthumous portrait by unknown artist

8th French Governor of Louisiana
- In office 1726–1733
- Monarch: Louis XV
- Preceded by: Pierre Dugué de Boisbriand
- Succeeded by: Jean-Baptiste Le Moyne, Sieur de Bienville

Personal details
- Born: Étienne Perier; February 27, 1686 Brest, France
- Died: April 1, 1766 (aged 80) Saint-Martin-des-Champs, France
- Spouse: Catherine le Chibelier (m. 1719; died 1756)
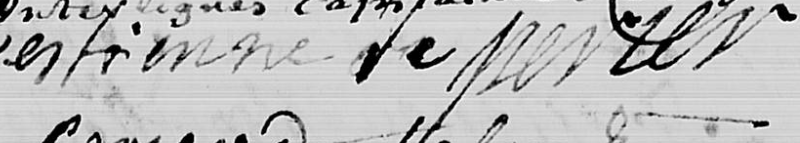
- Signature
- Nickname: Perier the Elder

Military service
- Allegiance: Kingdom of France
- Branch/service: French Navy
- Years of service: 1702–1765
- Rank: Lieutenant général des Armées navales
- Battles/wars: War of the Spanish Succession; Natchez Revolt; War of the Austrian Succession; Seven Years' War
- Awards: Order of Saint Louis; Grand-Croix

Étienne Perier or Étienne de Perier (Note: In sources, Perier's surname is variously rendered as Perier, Périer, or Perrier, both with and without the particle de.) (1686–1766), also known as Perier the Elder (French: Perier l'Aîné), was a French naval officer and governor of French Louisiana from 1726 to 1733. His time as governor included some notable achievements, including the construction of the first levee along the Mississippi River in 1727. In response to the Natchez Revolt, he attempted to completely destroy the Natchez people, which increased Native American hostility toward the French in the territory. Because he failed to secure the safety of the colony, Perier was recalled as governor in March 1733. He later distinguished himself as a naval officer and privateer, including during the capture of HMS Northumberland in 1744.

== Early life ==
Étienne Perier was born on February 27, 1686, in Brest in France. A member of the de Perier family, he was the son of Étienne Perier and Marie de Launay. His father was a non-noble shipowner and merchant in Le Havre. By 1691 the family moved to Dunkirk, where Perier's father served as captain of the Port of Dunkirk. In 1695, when he was eight, Perier joined a privateer crew alongside a son of Jean Bart, a friend of his father's. He saw his first action before he turned nine.

== In the French navy (1702–1714) ==
When he was 15, Perier began a military career at sea. French naval power at the time was invested primarily in a fleet of coursairs, and Perier served on several ships escorting convoys in the English Channel and the North Sea until August 1704, when he joined a company of gardes-marine. During the War of Spanish Succession, he participated in the capture of several British ships while serving under René Duguay-Trouin and Claude de Forbin, including sailing to Scotland as part of the failed French invasion of Britain.

In 1711, Perier was captured and held as a prisoner of war, but he was later released on the condition he no longer serve at sea. To comply with the terms of his parole, he served on land in the Marine Artillery Corps in Valenciennes, France. In June 1712, during the Holy Roman Empire's siege of Le Quesnoy, Perier took part in the city's defense. A falling parapet brick injured him during the siege, and he was captured again when the Austrians overran the city.

== In service of the Compagnies (1714–1726) ==
After the Wars of the Spanish Succession wound down in 1714, Perier returned to sea to combat pirates off the coast of Senegal for the Compagnie du Sénégal, which held a monopoly on the trade of enslaved people from West Africa. After 1718, it merged with several other French trading monopolies into the Company of the Indies.

In 1721, Perier served under his younger brother Antoine-Alexis during the capture of Arguin, an island off the coast of Mauritania. The Dutch retook the island a year later but lost it again in 1724 to French troops, including Perier and his brother. After recovering Arguin, the Company troops captured a battery and a fort at Portendick further down the Mauritanian coast before returning to France.

During his service with the Company of the Indies, Perier sailed in the South Pacific off the coasts of Chile and Peru, and spent six months in 1724 on the Malabar Coast, guarding the recently established fort at Mahé, India, which was under threat from local rulers.

== Governor of the French Louisiana (1726–1733) ==
In August 1726, after then-governor of French Louisiana Pierre Dugué de Boisbriant was recalled to France, Perier was appointed commandant general of the territory, overseeing military matters and relations with the Native Americans. He arrived in New Orleans in October 1726 and established his home at 613 Royal Street. Also in October, Louis XV ennobled Perier, his father, and his brother Antoine-Alexis by letters patent in recognition of the family's decades of service to the king.

Despite Perier's lack of experience in colonial administration, the Company of the Indies felt they had a long-time employee who would be a pliant administrator focused on the Company's goals. To ensure this, the Company granted him an annual salary of 10,000 French livres, (Note: 10,000 livres in 1725 is equivalent to about €151,000 in 2021. (Convertisseur de Monnaie d'Ancien Régime)) 10 arpents (8.4 acres; 3.4 hectares) of riverfront land, and eight enslaved people a year so long as he remained in office. He sold the land, which is in the modern McDonoghville neighborhood, in 1737.

The Company directed Perier to increase the colony's profitability, enforce discipline and loyalty, and keep the English from entering the territory. He was tasked specifically with completing improvements to secure the health and safety of New Orleans, as well as to visit the Company settlement in Natchez. Perier also sought to diffuse some of the partisan, religious, and familial cliques that had made running the colony difficult for his predecessors. In this, he had some initial successes, particularly in managing the dispute between Jesuit and Capuchin missionaries.

Perier launched a large public works effort, overseeing the construction of the first levees on the Mississippi River, clearing forests and brush from the land between the city and Lake Pontchartrain, and digging a canal from the Mississippi to connect the river to a rice mill on the king's plantation and Bayou St. John. Perier also sought to strengthen the colony's moral character with support for stronger civil punishment of vices, such as gambling, and support for the construction of more churches and rectories. He also welcomed the Ursuline nuns to the city; his wife, Catherine, laid the cornerstone for the nuns' first convent in the city.

=== Slavery policies ===
Achieving these public works required the labor of enslaved Africans. The Company of the Indies had a monopoly on the slave trade. During the time it controlled the colony, more captured Africans were imported to Louisiana than at any other point in the 18th century. With this steady supply of new captives, Perier tended to put enslaved people to work on public projects until they were auctioned off to local slaveholders. To increase the workforce, he began conscripting enslaved people for 30 days at a time. In most cases, they were conscripted when the Company first brought them to Louisiana before delivering them to their purchasers, raising the ire of Louisiana slaveholders. Perier instituted an apprenticeship program where enslaved people were loaned to craftsmen for three years to train them as brickmakers, joiners, masons, carpenters, and other skilled trades necessary to the growth and development of the colony. He also put enslaved Africans to work on Company ships, navigating the coast and rivers.

French settlers enslaved both Africans and Native Americans. Perier had growing concerns over alliances among enslaved people, and he encouraged slaveholders to keep enslaved Africans apart from enslaved Native Americans for fear of the two groups forming alliances. He was concerned in particular that Native Americans who escaped from slavery would induce enslaved Africans to escape and seek the protection of Native tribes. To foster mistrust between the two groups, Perier used armed enslaved African troops to attack neighboring Native Americans (although he was hesitant to rely on such troops for fear of inclining them to revolt), and he continued the policy of rewarding Native Americans for capturing escapees and disrupting maroon communities.

=== Native American relations ===
Perier's taking office marked the end of the indigenous policy established by former governor Jean-Baptiste Le Moyne de Bienville. Despite having been encouraged by the Company to learn from what Bienville had written about relations with the Native Americans, and recognizing the need to improve relations to forestall British advancement into the territory, Perier instead broke with Bienville's policy of diplomatic engagement with neighboring tribes.

Louisiana's colonial administrators at the time tried balancing the need to maintain good relations with Native Americans with demands from settlers for more and better land; however, Perier did not recognize Native American ownership of their traditional lands. This was in line with French desires to colonize New France, as opposed to earlier efforts to maintain the territory as a resource for trade.

While Perier worked to maintain positive relations with France's Choctaw and Quapaw allies, in other instances he sought to dominate tribes unwilling to align with France's colonial ambitions. In Illinois, at the border between France's Canada and Louisiana territories, the Meskwaki (Fox) in 1728 again declared war on France. Perier alongside his counterpart in Canada, the Marquis de Beauharnois, and the local commanders pursued a policy of complete destruction against the Meskwaki, despite the ill will it generated with other Native American tribes in the region. This approach would be seen in Perier's response to the Natchez revolt.

=== Personal ambition on Natchez land ===
The territory of the Natchez, on bluffs above the Mississippi River, had been noted by the Company of the Indies for its agricultural potential as early as 1717, and Fort Rosalie and several tobacco plantations were established there after the First Natchez War in 1716. The Company specifically told Perier to attend to the development of the Natchez settlement, and Perier saw an opportunity to establish his own plantation in the area, too.

To oversee Fort Rosalie and the Natchez settlement, Perier appointed the Sieur de Chépart. (Note: Different primary sources provide different spellings of the Sieur de Chépart's name, including Chepar, Chépart, Chopart, Dechepare, Deschepart, Detchéparre, d'Echepare, and Etcheparre, among other variations.) Chépart was described as "rapacious, haughty, and tyrannical," abusing soldiers, settlers, and the Natchez alike, including throwing Dumont de Montigny, who had overseen the fort under the previous commandant, into chains. With the help of some Illiniwek traders, Dumont escaped to New Orleans and reported on Chépart's actions, and the commandant was called before the Superior Council, which found him guilty of "acts of injustice".

Perier, who according to some sources was already in a partnership with Chépart to establish a large plantation at Natchez, overruled the Superior Council, pardoned Chépart, and sent him back to the Natchez territory. Upon his return, Chépart was working to secure land for himself and Perier's plantation. In spring 1729, Chépart ordered the Natchez to abandon the village of White Apple, an important cultural and religious site for the tribe, planting a missionary cross on the land to indicate he was acting on Perier's orders. To delay action against them, the Natchez asked Chépart to wait until after the fall harvest so they would be able to remove their ancestors' remains from White Apple. He granted their request, and the Natchez used the delay to plan the attack that marked the beginning of the Natchez revolt.

=== Natchez revolt and retaliation ===
On November 28, 1729, the Natchez Chief, the Great Sun, led his warriors into Fort Rosalie and captured the settlement, killing Sieur de Chépart and between 229 and 285 colonists and enslaved people, and taking about 450 captives, mostly French women and enslaved people. About a month later, the Natchez's allies, the Yazoo, made a similar attack on Fort St. Pierre. Ahead of the attack, the Natchez also recruited several enslaved Africans, arguing that driving off the colonists would mean freedom for them as well.

According to historian Lyle Saxon, in response to the Natchez revolt, Perier "made the grave mistake of trying to inspire the Indians with fear," seeking the complete destruction of the Natchez and their allies to ensure the safety of the colony. Supposing a general conspiracy among the indigenous tribes in the area, he launched an indiscriminate campaign of attacks. He began by authorizing an attack in December 1729 by enslaved Africans on the unaligned Chaouacha tribe south of New Orleans, rewarding the men by freeing them from slavery. He also proposed attacks against other tribes along the Mississippi, regardless of their involvement in the revolt, earning a rebuke from Controller-General of Finances Philibert Orry, who described the plan as "acting against all the rules of good government and against those of humanity".

In January 1730, French and allied Choctaw soldiers caught the Natchez by surprise and recovered 54 women and children and 100 enslaved people. Throughout 1730, Perier sought to make examples of captured Natchez men and women, including torturing them and burning them alive in public executions. Lacking enough troops to handle the revolt and unwilling to rely too heavily on France's Choctaw allies, Perier sought reinforcements from France.

The Natchez continued to resist the French until January 1731, when Perier and colonial soldiers, along with two battalions of marines commanded by his brother, Antoine-Alexis, successfully captured the Natchez's Grand Village. The Great Sun and nearly 500 more Natchez men, women, and children were captured and shipped to Saint-Domingue, where they were sold into slavery. However, an undetermined number of other Natchez escaped to seek refuge with (and eventual assimilation) into other tribes, including the English-allied Chickasaw and Cherokee, further straining the French's already poor relationship with the Chickasaw.

=== Aftermath and recall ===
In his reports on the Natchez revolt and his response, Perier suggested a conspiracy among the tribes, perhaps with British encouragement, was responsible for the revolt, to divert attention from the role Chépart and his orders played in igniting the conflict. However, this story did not gain credence back in France, nor in Louisiana. Instead, the Company criticized Perier for letting his personal plans for a Natchez plantation distract him from his public responsibilities. This fit the analysis of historian Michael James Forêt, who found that the roots of the Natchez revolt "lay in a larger pattern of Franco–Natchez conflict and the greed of Perier and the commandant of Fort Rosalie".

In the aftermath of the revolt, Perier attempted to punish the Chickasaw for taking in Natchez refugees and continued his harsh approach toward even allied Native Americans, which raised the concern of other military and civil officials in the colony. At the same time, he sought to reward some Native allies, such as the Quapaw, by expanding trading posts, including commissioning the Sieur de Vincennes to establish Fort Vincennes on the lower Wabash River.

In June 1731, Perier faced an attempted slave uprising, the Samba rebellion, involving enslaved Bambara peoples inspired by the Natchez revolt. As he had done with Natchez prisoners, Perier ordered torture and public executions using a breaking wheel for the men and women who planned the attempted uprising.

In the end, Perier was criticized for his support of Chépart and his policies towards Native Americans, which failed to provide security and stability for the colony. Ultimately, the result of the revolt was a further weakening of the Company, which was still suffering from the bursting of the Mississippi Bubble in 1720. Because of its ongoing financial losses in the territory in 1731, the Company abandoned its charter and returned Louisiana to the king. Despite questions about his management of the Natchez revolt, Perier remained in place as governor of the colony, although the king's advisors, particularly the Count of Maupaus, sought to replace him. Working with the newly arrived commissaire-ordonnateur, Edmé Gatien Salmon, Perier reorganized the governing council to remove the Company's representatives. However, the new council suffered from competing military and civilian concerns, and Perier's efforts to remove two critical councilors later contributed to the decision to remove him as governor.

In 1733, Perier was recalled to France to answer for his handling of the Natchez revolt, and former Louisiana governor Bienville was appointed to replace him.

== Return to the navy (1733–1766) ==
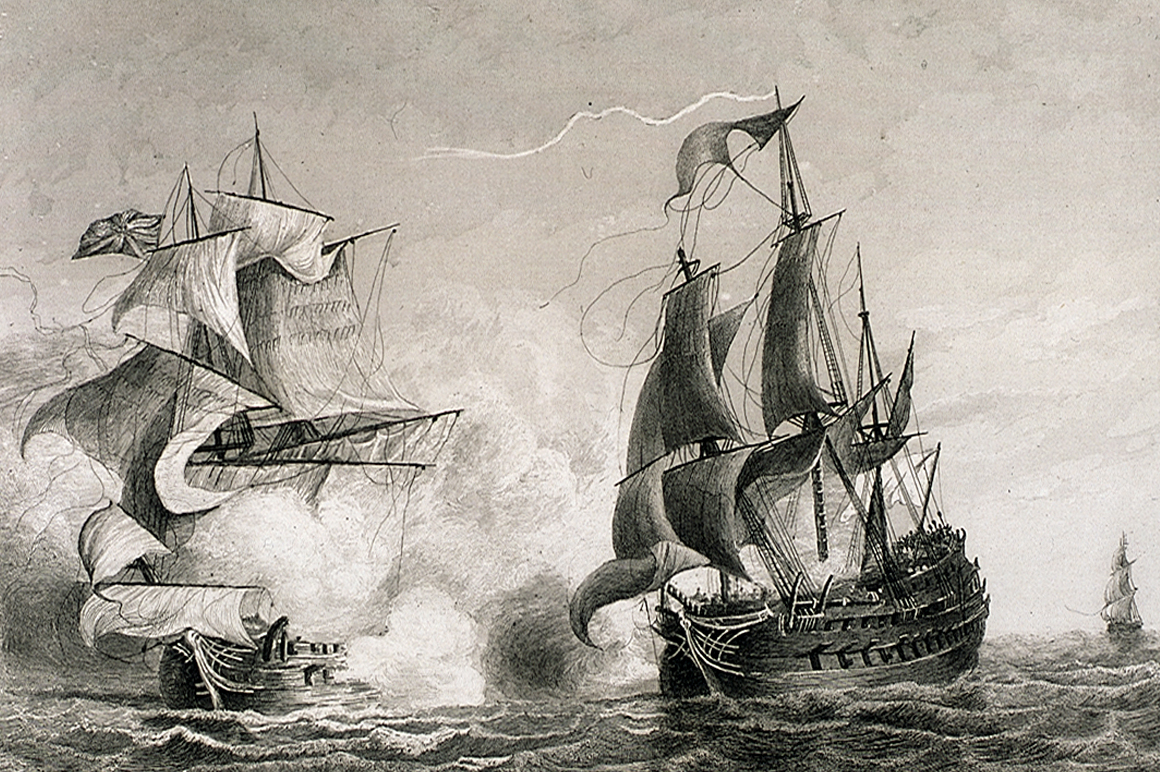
The action of 8 May 1744, at which Perier captured HMS Northumberland

After his recall, Perier and his family returned to France, and by 1734 he returned to sea as second officer on the Neptune, cruising off the coast of Senegal. By 1737 he had settled in Brest, and made a career in the French Navy. During the War of the Austrian Succession, he commanded the Mars at the capture of HMS Northumberland during the action of 8 May 1744 and participated in the failed Duc d'Anville expedition of 1746. He later commanded a squadron of four warships and two frigates in the Caribbean during the Seven Years' War. In 1757, he was promoted to Lieutenant général des Armées navales.

At the end of his career, on August 23, 1765, Perier was awarded the Grand-Croix of the Order of Saint Louis. At the time, only two Grand-Croix were allocated to the Ministry of the Navy. He was first inducted into the Order as a chevalier in 1727 after being named governor of Louisiana and elevated to commandeur in 1755.

Perier died due to anasarca on April 1, 1766, at his daughter's home, Tréoudal castle in Saint-Martin-des-Champs, France.

== Personal life ==
Étienne Perier married Catherine le Chibelier (1691–1956), daughter of an échevin (municipal official) from Le Havre and the widow of naval officer Jacques Graton de Chambellan, on September 21, 1719. They had three sons and a daughter. Two of the sons, Étienne Louis (1720–1756) and Antoine Louis (1728–1759), lived to adulthood and followed their father's footsteps into military service.

== Legacy ==
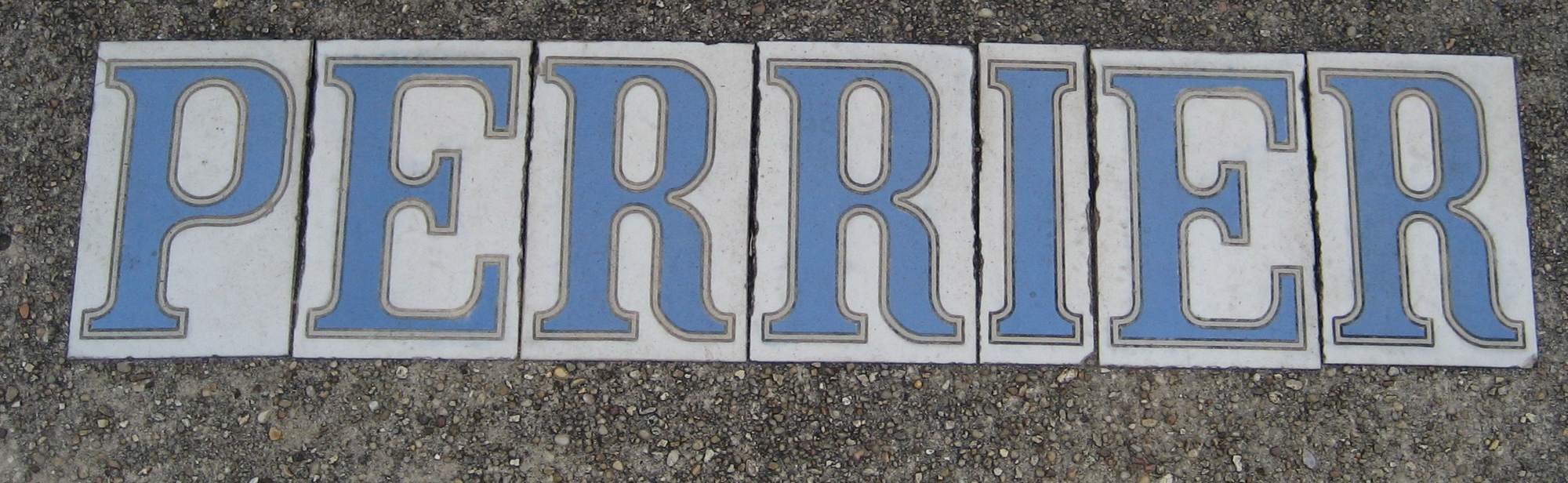
New Orleans tiled lettering marking Perrier Street.

In 1890, the city of New Orleans named a street after Perier, although with the spelling "Perrier." Perrier Street runs mostly through the Uptown section of the city, between Saint Charles Avenue and the Mississippi River.

== Notes ==
=== References ===
Preceded by Pierre Dugué de Boisbriant	French Governor of Louisiana; 1727–1733	Succeeded by Jean-Baptiste le Moyne de Bienville
