= Antoine-Alexis Perier de Salvert =

Antoine Alexis Perier de Salvert
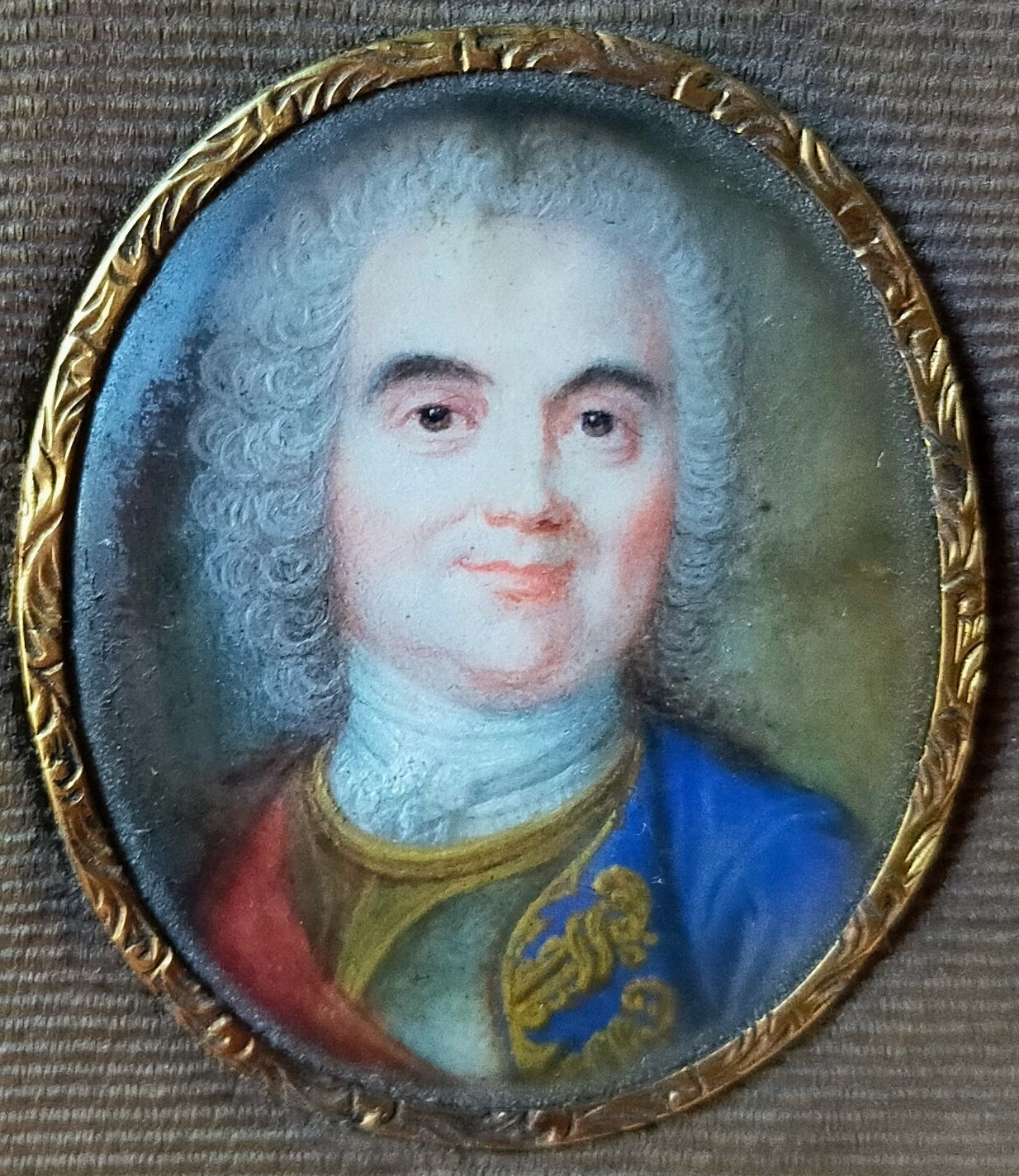
- Born: Antoine-Alexis Perier (Note: On his birth certificate (4 September 1691 in Dunkirk), his name was Antoine-Alexis Perier, son of sieur Estienne Perier); 3 September 1691; Dunkirk, France
- Died: 7 April 1757 (aged 65); Versailles, France
- Burial place: Church of Notre-Dame, Versailles
- Spouse(s): Marie-Françoise de Piotard (m. 1729) Angélique-Rosalie de Laduz de Vieuxchamps (m. 1749)
- Military career
- Allegiance: Kingdom of France
- Branch: French Navy
- Rank: Chef d'escadre in the French Navy
- Nicknames: Perier the Younger; Perier the Cadet
- Awards: Commander of the Order of Saint-Louis in (1756)

Signature
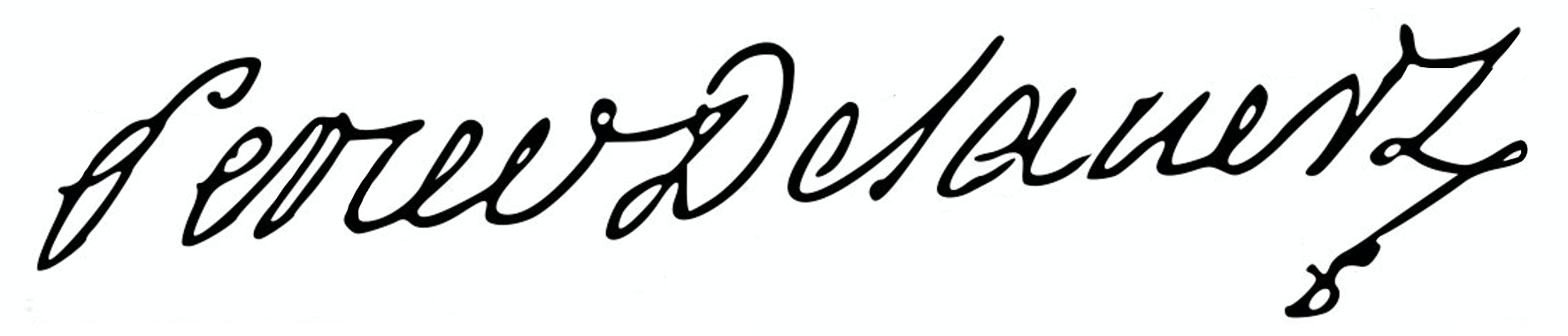

Antoine Alexis Perier (Note: In sources, Perier's surname is variously rendered as Perier, Périer, or Perrier, both with and without the particle de.) (1691–1757), also known as Perier the Younger (French: Perier jeune), Perier the Cadet, and (after 1729) Perier de Salvert, (Note: Raymond de Bertrand in his book Notice historique sur Antoine-Alexis Perier de Salvert writes: "It is to be believed that it was about the time of his marriage in 1729 that Perier added to his surname, the name of Salvert") (Note: On his burial certificate (April 8, 1757), his declared name is "Perier de Salvert") was a French naval officer appointed to the rank of chef d'escadre in 1752, commander of the order of Saint-Louis.

== Early life ==
Coat of arms of the de Perier family.

Antoine Alexis Perier de Salvert was a member of the de Perier family. He was the son of Étienne Perier and Marie de Launay. His father was a non-noble shipowner and merchant in Le Havre and a captain of the Port of Dunkirk. (In October 1726, he was ennobled via letters patent of Louis XV together with his father and his brother Étienne in recognition of the family's decades of service to the king).

From 1701 to 1702 he sailed as a privateer on a frigate off the English coast, and then on the Escadre du Nord under Pointis and Saint-Pol Hécourt. In 1705, his father secured him a position as a garde de la Marine, but he continued to serve in a fleet of French corsairs.

== Career in the French Navy ==
From 1705 he became an ensign on several privateer ships in Duguay-Trouin's squadron and Forbin's squadron. He took part in several naval battles along the coasts of England, Scotland, Russia, Norway and Denmark.

He was on board the Protée when in October 1707 Forbin's squadron captured three English ships — HMS Cumberland, HMS Chester, and HMS Ruby — and sank HMS Devonshire during the Battle at The Lizard.

In March 1708 he was given command of a frigate in Forbin's squadron which failed to transport James Francis Edward Stuart to Scotland. The same year, he served on Blekoualle under captain Du Quesnel. In 1709 Du Quesnel gave him the command of a captured ship.

In 1709 he took command of a brigantine and captured a privateer ship from Ostend and later he served on the frigate the Zéphyr. He was wounded in the stomach by a "dead bullet". When the Zéphyr was captured, he was a prisoner for six months in England.

In 1712 he took command of the Lion and captured 37 merchant ships.

In 1716 he moved to the service of the Compagnie du Sénégal. He was given command of a 30-gun frigate and took back Fort James in Gambia from pirates.

From 1720 to 1722 he served the Compagnie des Indes. He was given command of four armed frigates. In 1721, he took over the fortress of Arguin after 13 days of siege. He got his brevet of ensign of vessel on 16 August 1721.

From 1722 to 1724 he was attached to the direction of works of the port of Lorient in Brittany.

In 1724 he returned to the service of the Compagnie des Indes. He took command of two frigates and six transport vessels of the Compagnie.

In 1724 after 13 days of siege, he took over the forts of Arguin and Portendick occupied by the Dutch.

In 1727 he was in France and served on the Neptune commanded by the Marquis d'O.

In 1730 he got a brevet of lieutenant de vaisseau and the commanded the Fluyt Somme. He was also appointed king's lieutenant to the Louisiana government under the orders of his brother, Étienne Perier, governor of Louisiana. He arrived in Louisiana in 1731, made an expedition against the Natchez and returned in France.

In 1733 he was appointed second captain on the Griffon, then commander of the Méduse.

In 1734 he was on the Fleuron under the command of M. de Beauharnais. The vessel was in charge of transporting soldiers to help the King of Poland during the Siege of Danzig.

In 1738–1739 he commanded the Astrée in charge of protecting along the coasts of Guinea the trade of the Compagnie des Indes from the attacks of the English. In 1739, he destroyed along the coast of Morocco the flagship of the Salé Rovers.

On 1 May 1741 he was appointed capitaine de vaisseau.

In March 1744 he commanded the Dauphin-Royal.

In 1745, during the siege of Louisbourg, he was appointed to command a squadron for the defense of Louisbourg, but the expedition was canceled.

In 1747 he got the command of Northumberland and of a squadron sent to help Canada.

On 17 February 1750 he was appointed commissioner general of artillery. Then, he commanded Le Lys and a division on the coast of Guinea. On his return, he was appointed chef d'escadre on 1 September 1752.

In 1755 he commanded Bizarre in comte Dubois's squadron and he went to Duisburg.

In 1756 the king appointed him attached to the council of the Ministry of Marine and director of naval charts and plans.

He died on 7 April 1757 in Versailles, France, and was buried the day after in the Notre-Dame de Versailles in the presence of the first officers of the court.

== Decorations ==
- Knight of the Order of Saint Louis on 13 May 1738.
- Commander of the Order of Saint Louis on 19 June 1756 (honorary) and 19 October 1756.

== Personal life ==
Perier de Salvert married in 1729 Marie-Françoise de Piotard and in 1749 Angélique-Rosalie de Laduz. He had two sons from his first marriage and one from his second marriage.

After his first marriage he lived in the manor of Moros near Concarneau in Brittany, which he bought from Abraham Duquesne.

== See also ==
- de Perier de Salvert family
- Étienne Perier
- Éléonor Jacques Marie Stanislas Perier de Salvert

== Sources ==
- de Bertrand, Raymond (1861). Notice historique sur Antoine-Alexis Perier de Salvert (in Mémoires de la Société dunkerquoise pour l'encouragement des sciences, des lettres et des arts) [Historical notice on Antoine-Alexis Perier de Salvert] (in French). Dunkirk, France: Société dunkerquoise pour l'encouragement des sciences, des lettres et des arts. pp. 229–263.
