= Éléonor Jacques Marie Stanislas Perier de Salvert =

Eléonor Jacques Marie Stanislas Perier de Salvert
- Born: 14 November 1748; Brest, France
- Died: 20 June 1783 (aged 34–35) off Cuddalore, India
- Military career
- Allegiance: Kingdom of France
- Branch: French Navy
- Rank: Lieutenant de vaisseau in the French Navy

Éléonor Jacques Marie Stanislas Perier de Salvert (1748 – 1783) was a lieutenant de vaisseau in the French Navy.

== Biography ==
Coat of arms of the de Perier family.

Éléonor Jacques Marie Stanislas Perier de Salvert was a member of the de Perier family. He was the son of Antoine Alexis Perier de Salvert and Angélique Aimée Rosalie de Laduz de Vieuxchamps. He joined the Navy as a Garde-Marine on 5 April 1762, and was promoted to Lieutenant on 14 February 1778.

In 1772, he was captain of the 4-gun cutter Furet.

In 1776, he was at Isle de France (Mauritius).

He served under Jean-Baptiste François Lollivier de Tronjoly on the 64-gun Brillant from 20 August to 3 September 1778, when he transferred to the frigate Pourvoyeuse as Saint-Orens' first officer. From 9 October to 9 December, he was in command of Enighed, a Danish prize that he brought to Port-Louis Later, he was promoted to the command of the frigate Fine.

On 14 July 1782, he was given command of the 54-gun Flamand, replacing Cuverville who had been promoted to the Vengeur.

He was killed in action at the Battle of Cuddalore on 20 June 1783, by the first broadside fired by the British.

== See also ==
- de Perier family
- Antoine-Alexis Perier de Salvert
- Étienne Perier

== Sources ==
- "Périer de Salvert" (PDF). Académie de Marine.
- Cunat, Charles (1852). Histoire du Bailli de Suffren. Rennes: A. Marteville et Lefas. pp. 447.
- Doneaud Du Plan, Alfred (1878). Histoire de l'Académie de Marine. Paris: Berger-Levrault. p. 124.
- "Fonds Marine, sous-série B/4: Campagnes, 1571-1785" (PDF). Archives nationales.
- Lacour-Gayet, Georges (1910). La marine militaire de la France sous le règne de Louis XV. Paris: Honoré Champion.
- Roche, Jean-Michel (2005). Dictionnaire des bâtiments de la flotte de guerre française de Colbert à nos jours 1 1671 - 1870. p. 87. ISBN 978-2-9525917-0-6. OCLC 165892922.
- Roussel, Claude-Youenn; Forrer, Claude (2019). Tromelin et Suffren, un conflit entre marins. Kronos. ISBN 978-2-917232-88-0.
- van Hille, Jean-Marc. "Éléonor Jacques Périer de Salvert (1748-1783), lieutenant de vaisseau, fondateur de la loge La Triple Espérance à l'Orient de Port-Louis dans l'Île de France".
