= Pierre-Étienne de Perier =

French general

- Born: Antoine Pierre-Étienne de Perier; October 31, 1893; Laghouat, French Algeria
- Died: June 22, 1968 (aged 74); Paris, France
- Alma mater: École spéciale militaire de Saint-Cyr
- Relatives: Maxime Weygand
- Military career
- Allegiance: France
- Branch: French Army
- Service years: 1912–1950
- Rank: Divisional general
- Nickname: General de Perier
- Unit: Troupes de marine
- Conflicts: First World War; Occupation of the Rhineland; Rif War; Second World War; Tunisian campaign; First Indochina War

Pierre-Étienne de Perier (31 October 1893 – 22 June 1968) was a French divisional general, Grand Officer of the Legion of Honour, and magazine editor.

== Early life ==
=== Origins ===
Antoine Pierre-Étienne de Perier was a member of the de Perier family. Its coat of arms bears "Silver, a fess of vert accompanied by four cinquefoils of the same laid one to each canton of the shield".

He was born on 31 October 1893 in Laghouat, French Algeria, to Antoine Léonor de Perier (1842–1908), commander of the 2nd Battalion of African Light Infantry and Officer of the Legion of Honour, and Louise Loubère (1862–1939), daughter of colonel Jean-Louis Loubère, governor of French Guiana.

=== Education ===
De Perier entered the École spéciale militaire de Saint-Cyr, class of Montmirail (1912–1914), and enlisted the same year, quickly being promoted to corporal.

== Service during World War I ==
On 28 August 1914, in the battle of La Besace (Ardennes), he was seriously wounded in the jaw by a bullet while charging the Germans. This action earned him a mention in the army order: "Well behaved in combat on 28 August 1914, brilliantly charged with the bayonet at the head of his section, was seriously wounded". In 1916, he was posted to the Armée d'Orient, and became a captain in the Zouaves in 1917.

== Inter-war period ==
A regional topographer in Morocco from 1919 to 1921, he joined the colonial infantry. He was sent to Germany, in the French army of the Rhineland, from 1921 to 1925.

Then a commander, he was aide-de-camp to General Franchet d'Esperey from 1932 to 1934.

== Service during World War II ==
In June 1940, the Third Army, of which he was sub-chief of staff, was surrounded in Lorraine by Guderian, who led Operation Tiger. De Perier was captured by the Nazis but managed to escape: "was particularly noted for his initiative, energy and courage during the period from 1 June to 22 June 1940. Taken prisoner after the encirclement of his army, he escaped and managed to elude the horsemen in pursuit and reached the unoccupied zone of French territory after having circulated for eight days in the German lines". He was awarded the Escapees' medal by decree in 1945.

From September 1940 to May 1942, promoted to colonel, he became chief of staff to General Maxime Weygand.

In 1941, the African Army had to be put in a position to enter the campaign. To this end, it was necessary to complete its units, create security formations to replace the garrisons and reconstitute their maintenance services. These objectives could only be achieved by mobilization, which colonel de Perier decided to do.

From 1942, he took part in the Tunisian campaign.

== Service during First Indochina War ==
Inspector general of Colonial troops in October 1944, he was assistant to generals Valluy and Salan during the First Indochina War. He was cited in the army order in 1947.

== End of career ==
In 1948, de Perier was heard at Weygand's trial before the High Court. He gave a long deposition in which he defended the accused.

He chaired the Revue Économique Française when it was reissued in 1952 under the Société de Géographie Commerciale. This journal dealt with economic issues and overseas territories.

General de Perier died on 22 June 1968 in Paris.

== Military ranks ==
- Aspirant (11 October 1913)
- Second lieutenant (5 August 1914)
- Captain (6 July 1917)
- Commander (25 December 1929)
- Lieutenant-colonel (24 March 1936)
- Colonel (25 June 1940)
- Brigadier general (1 June 1943)
- Divisional general (1 November 1950)

== Decorations ==
=== French, French Colonial or Inter-Allied decorations ===
- Croix de guerre des théâtres d'opération extérieurs
- Croix de guerre 1914-1918
- Croix de guerre 1939-1945
- Escapees' Medal (1945)
- Grand Officer of the Legion of Honour (1950)
- Cross for Military Valour
- Morocco commemorative medal
- Victory Medal 1914-1918
- 1914–1918 Commemorative war medal
- Combatant's Cross
- Orient campaign medal
- Medal for the War Wounded

=== Foreign decorations ===
- Moroccan Peace Medal
- Commemorative Cross for the 1914-1918 Liberation War and the Union
- Order of Ouissam Alaouite

== Works ==
- Study on the landings by sea in the French Military Review
