= Pressagny-l'Orgueilleux =

- Commune
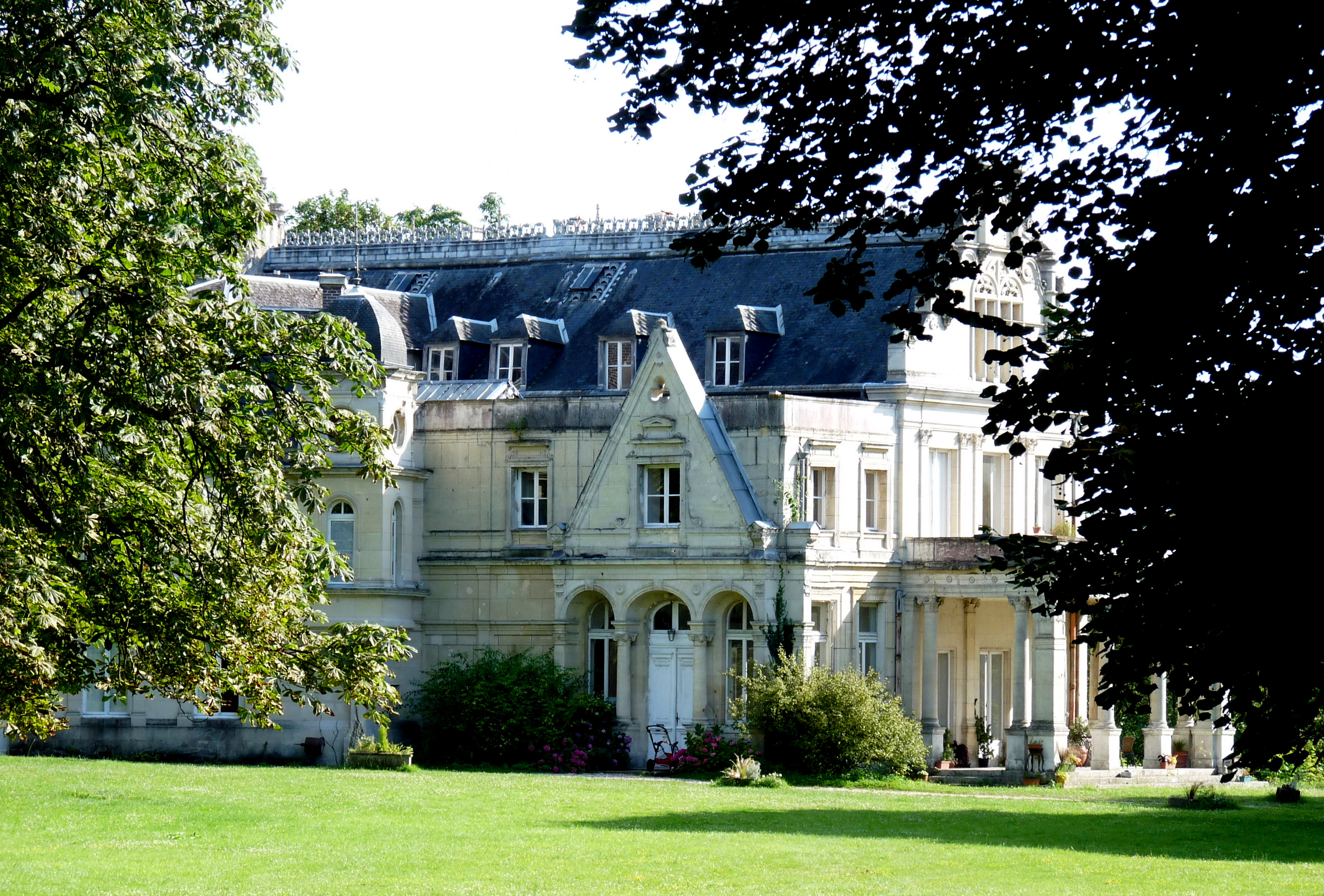
- The château of la Madeleine in Pressagny-l'Orgueilleux
- Location of Pressagny-l'Orgueilleux
- Location within France Location within Normandy
- Coordinates: 49°07′59″N 1°26′48″E
- Country: France
- Region: Normandy
- Department: Eure
- Arrondissement: Les Andelys
- Canton: Les Andelys
- Intercommunality: Seine Normandie Agglomération

Government
  - Mayor (2020–2026): Pascal Mainguy
- Area^{1}: 10.27 km^{2} (3.97 sq mi)
- Elevation: 31 m (102 ft)
- Highest elevation: 136 m (446 ft)
- Lowest elevation: 12 m (39 ft)
- Population (2023): 686
  - Density: 66.8/km^{2} (173/sq mi)
- Time zone: UTC+01:00 (CET)
  - Summer (DST): UTC+02:00 (CEST)
- INSEE/Postal code: 27477 /27510
- ^{1} French Land Register data, which excludes lakes, ponds, glaciers > 1 km^{2} (0.386 sq mi or 247 acres) and river estuaries.

Pressagny-l'Orgueilleux (French pronunciation: [pʁɛsaɲi lɔʁɡœjø]) is a commune in the Eure department in Normandy in northern France.

== Population ==
Historical population
Year	Pop.	±% p.a.
1968	232	—
1975	327	+5.03%
1982	482	+5.70%
1990	617	+3.13%
1999	757	+2.30%
2007	720	−0.62%
2012	707	−0.36%
2017	706	−0.03%
2023	686	−0.48%
Source: INSEE

== See also ==
- Communes of the Eure department
