= French ship Neptune (1723) =

Ship of the line of the French Navy

History

France
- Name: Neptune
- Builder: Brest
- Laid down: February 1723
- Launched: November 1723
- Commissioned: 1724
- Fate: Captured 1747

General characteristics
- Type: Third-rate ship of the line
- Displacement: 2500 tonneaux
- Tons burthen: 1500 port tonneaux
- Length: 50.2 m (164 ft 8 in)
- Beam: 13.6 m (44 ft 7 in)
- Draught: 7.3 m (23 ft 11 in)
- Crew: 556
- Armament: 74 guns

Neptune was a third-rate ship of the line of the French Royal Navy, designed by Hélie.

Neptune was captured in 1747 during the Second Battle of Cape Finisterre.
