= Portendick =

Portendick Porto d'Arco
- Location in Mauritania
- Coordinates: 18°35′N 16°7′W
- Country: Mauritania
- Region: Trarza

Portendick is an abandoned coastal city in western Mauritania. The name is a corruption of the Portuguese name Porto d'Arco. It was located in the Ouad Naga Department of Trarza Region.

Founded by the Dutch in 1721 after the French capture of Arguin, Portendick was a significant port for the gum arabic trade. It was the site of a major battle during the Char Bouba war between Arab Hassan and Berber Zawaya tribes.

By the 19th century, however, trade from the port had massively declined. The advancing desert had moved the Acacia senegal groves far to the south, closer to the commercial outlet of Saint-Louis on the Senegal River. The area's arid, desert climate and lack of clean drinking water, a natural harbor, or a trading post contributed to the decline. Nevertheless, British traders would still purchase gum there, particularly when France and the Emirate of Trarza were at war. In 1825 they formed the English Company of Portendick to formalize tax payments to the Emir. The French blockaded the port for a year in 1835, during another conflict with the Trarza, capturing several British merchant vessels.

As of 1916, all that remained of the city was a small group of huts.
