= Saint-Martin-des-Champs, Finistère =

Saint-Martin-des-Champs Sant-Martin-war-ar-Maez
- Commune
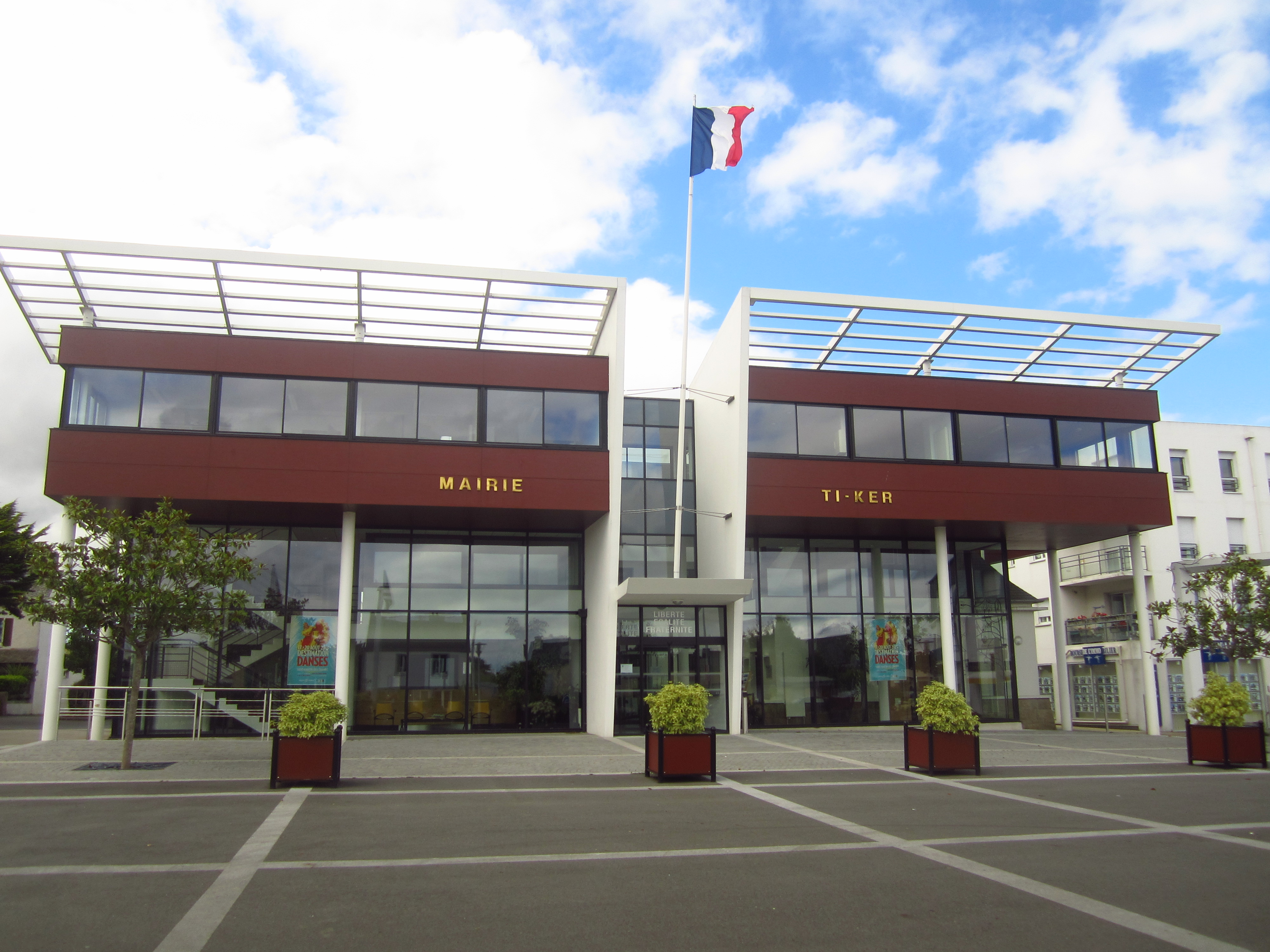
- The town hall in Saint-Martin-des-Champs

- Coat of arms
- Location of Saint-Martin-des-Champs
- Location within France Location within Brittany
- Coordinates: 48°34′37″N 3°50′33″W
- Country: France
- Region: Brittany
- Department: Finistère
- Arrondissement: Morlaix
- Canton: Morlaix
- Intercommunality: Morlaix Communauté

Government
  - Mayor (2020–2026): François Hamon
- Area^{1}: 15.70 km^{2} (6.06 sq mi)
- Highest elevation: 113 m (371 ft)
- Lowest elevation: 0 m (0 ft)
- Population (2023): 4,773
  - Density: 304.0/km^{2} (787.4/sq mi)
- Time zone: UTC+01:00 (CET)
  - Summer (DST): UTC+02:00 (CEST)
- INSEE/Postal code: 29254 /29600
- ^{1} French Land Register data, which excludes lakes, ponds, glaciers > 1 km^{2} (0.386 sq mi or 247 acres) and river estuaries.

Saint-Martin-des-Champs (French pronunciation: [sɛ̃ maʁtɛ̃ de ʃɑ̃]; Breton: Sant-Martin-war-ar-Maez) is a commune in the Finistère department of Brittany in north-western France. Since 2014 the mayor has been François Hamon, who was reelected in 2020.

== Population ==
Inhabitants of Saint-Martin-des-Champs are called in French Saint-Martinois.

Historical population

Year	Pop.	±% p.a.
1793	897	—
1800	846	−0.83%
1806	309	−15.45%
1821	944	+7.73%
1831	975	+0.32%
1836	1,053	+1.55%
1841	1,334	+4.84%
1846	1,305	−0.44%
1851	1,289	−0.25%
1856	1,446	+2.33%
1861	1,366	−1.13%
1866	1,396	+0.44%
1872	1,450	+0.63%
1876	1,564	+1.91%
1881	1,596	+0.41%
1886	1,697	+1.23%
1891	1,786	+1.03%
1896	1,842	+0.62%
1901	2,019	+1.85%

Year	Pop.	±% p.a.
1906	2,068	+0.48%
1911	2,015	−0.52%
1921	1,905	−0.56%
1926	2,027	+1.25%
1931	2,276	+2.34%
1936	2,507	+1.95%
1946	2,716	+0.80%
1954	2,534	−0.86%
1962	2,685	+0.73%
1968	3,086	+2.35%
1975	4,617	+5.92%
1982	5,170	+1.63%
1990	4,933	−0.58%
1999	4,709	−0.52%
2007	4,763	+0.14%
2012	4,722	−0.17%
2017	4,593	−0.55%
2023	4,773	+0.64%

Source: EHESS and INSEE (1968-2023)

== Breton language ==
The municipality launched a language scheme for the Breton language through Ya d'ar brezhoneg on 27 October 2005.

== See also ==
- Communes of the Finistère department
