= Arguin =

Arguin أرغين
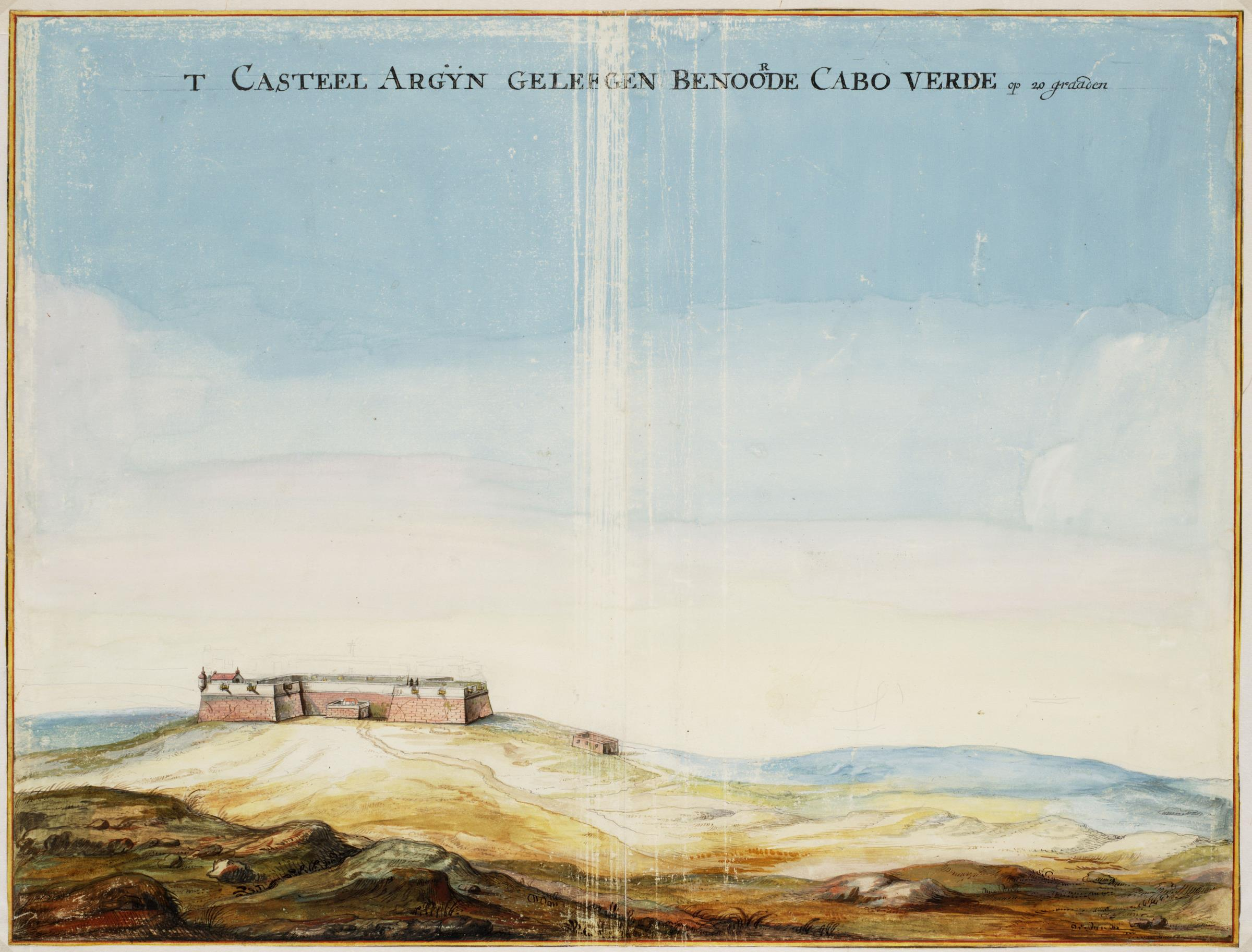
- Watercolour drawing of Fort Arguin by Johannes Vingboons, ca. 1663

- Location in Mauritania
- Coordinates: 20.6000°N 16.4500°W
- Country: Mauritania
- Region: Dakhlet Nouadhibou Region
- Elevation: 0 m (0 ft)

Arguin (Arabic: أرغين : Arghīn; Portuguese: Arguim) is an island off the western coast of Mauritania in the Bay of Arguin. It is approximately 6 km × 2 km (3.7 mi × 1.2 mi) in size, with extensive and dangerous reefs around it. The island is now part of the Banc d'Arguin National Park.

== History ==
The island changed hands frequently during the colonial era. The first European to visit the island was the Portuguese explorer Nuno Tristão, in 1443. In 1445, Prince Henry the Navigator set up a feitoria on the island, which acquired gum arabic and enslaved people for Portugal. By 1455, 800 enslaved people were shipped from Arguin to Portugal every year.

=== Dutch West India Company rule ===
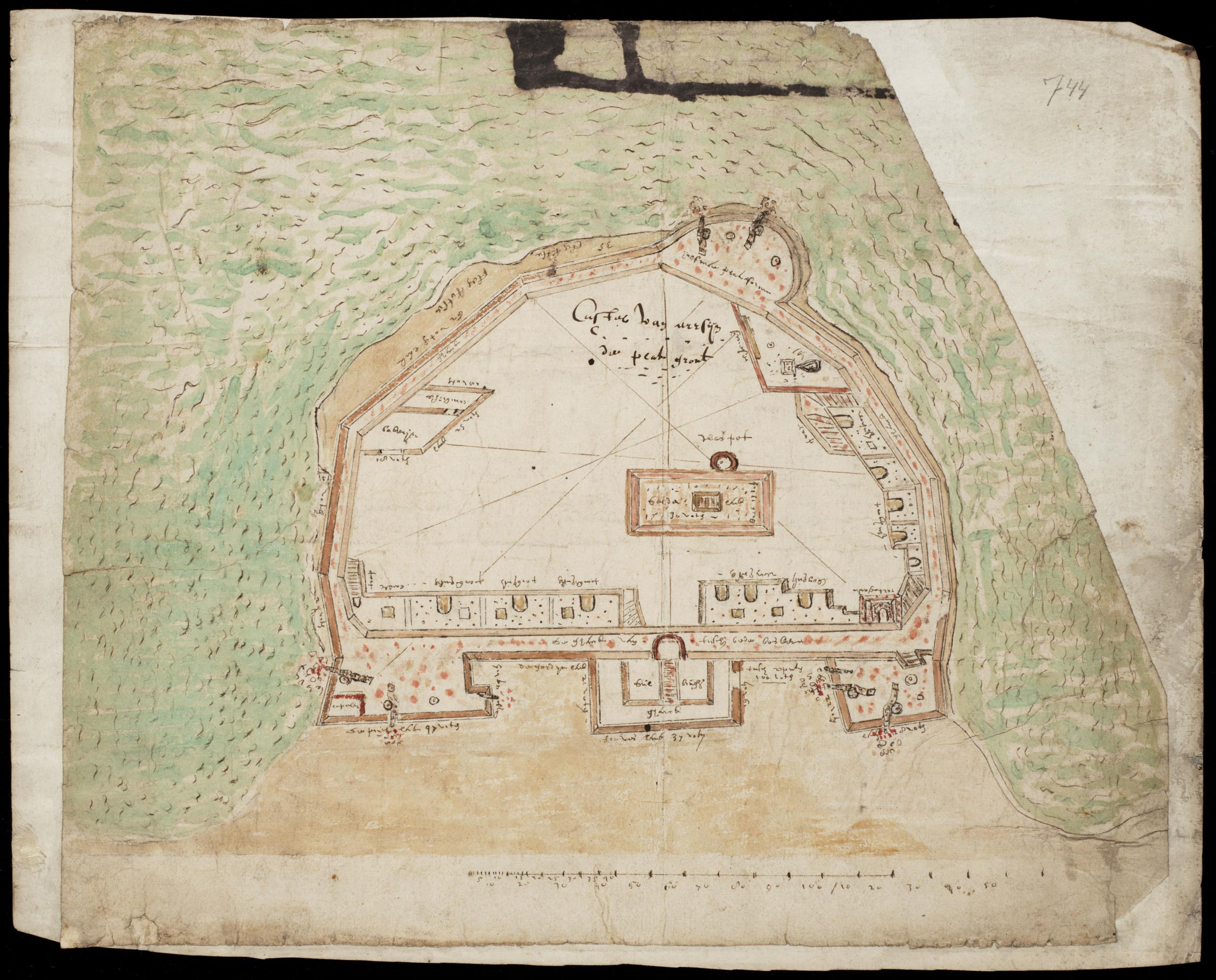
Floor plan of Fort Arguin, presumably drafted after the capture of Fort Arguin in 1633.

On 5 February 1633, a Dutch expeditionary force of forty soldiers under the command of Laurens Cameels took possession of Fort Arguin. They did this under the orders of the Zeeland chamber of the Dutch West India Company, which had awarded a patroonship over the island to Abraham van Peere, who also possessed the colony of Berbice in South America.

Abraham van Peere sent his son Daniel to Arguin to serve as its first chief factor. Daniel van Peere was taken hostage and eventually murdered by local peoples after setting out on a trading mission to Porto d'Arco in July 1633. This led to a mutiny among the soldiers and a subsequent prosecution of the leaders of the mutiny in Zeeland.

The island remained under the authority of the Zeeland chamber of the Dutch West India Company until 1678, with a brief interruption by English rule in 1665. Around 1670, it was occupied by a chief factor and a garrison of 25 men. France took over the island in September 1678, but it was then abandoned until 1685. Arguin's aridity and its lack of a good anchorage made long-term European settlement difficult.

=== Brandenburg rule ===
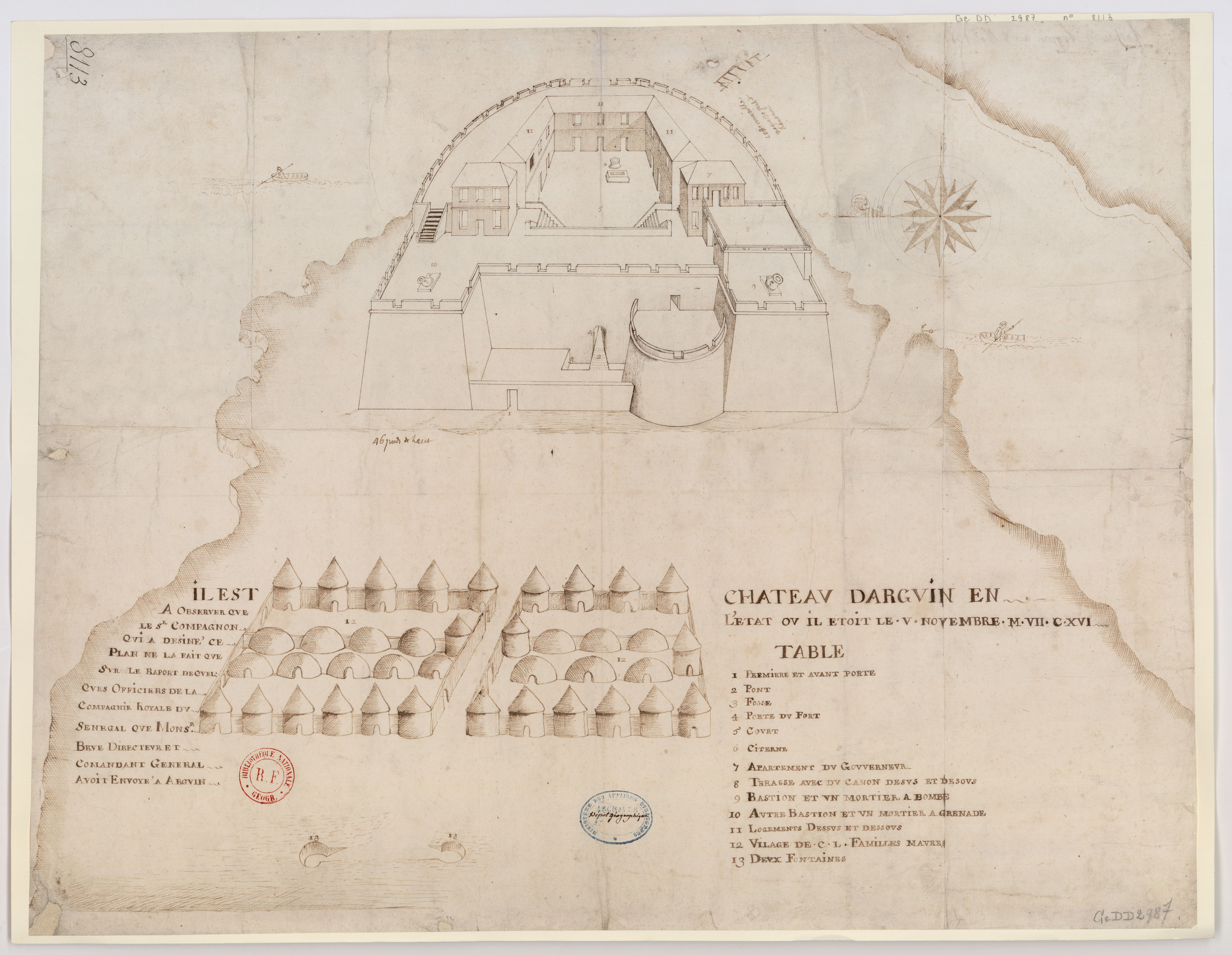
Arguin in 1716.

In 1685, Captain Cornelius Reers of the frigate Rother Löwe occupied the old Portuguese fort on the island. He successfully concluded a treaty with the native king, in which Brandenburg was accepted as a protecting power. The treaty was ratified in 1687 and was renewed in 1698. Arguin remained a colony of Brandenburg until 1721, when the French successfully assaulted the fort and then took control of the island. The Dutch took the fort and island from the French the following year, only to lose it again in 1724 to the French. This period of French rule lasted four years; in 1728, it reverted to the control of indigenous peoples.

The island was included in the territory of the French colony of Mauritania, and it remained under Mauritanian rule when that country became independent in 1960.

In July 1816, the French frigate Méduse, bound for Senegal, was wrecked off Arguin and 350 people died.

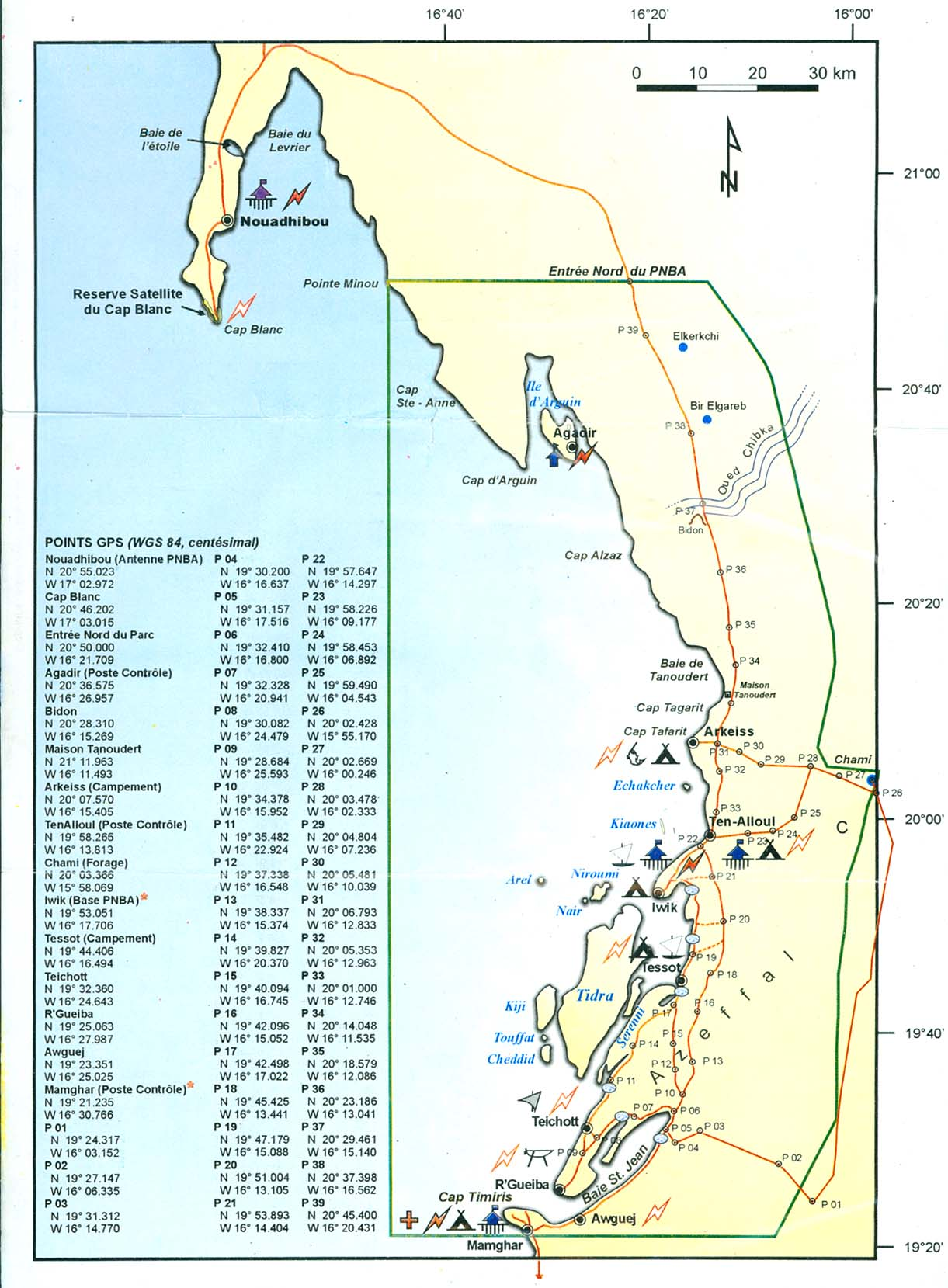
Map of Banc d'Arguin, including Arguin and Tidra Island Notes
