= Renzo Moro =

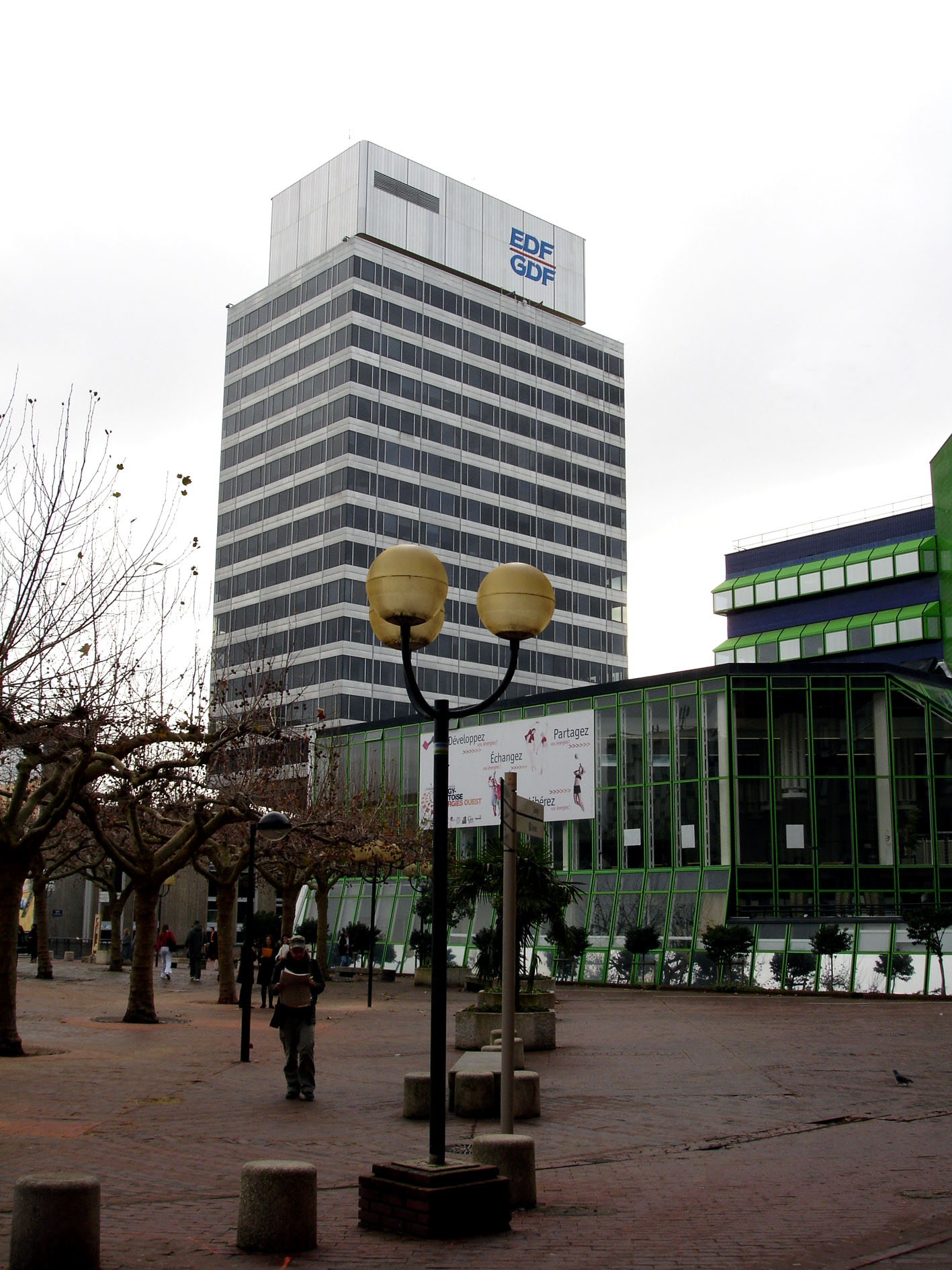
EDF-GDF tower, Cergy-Pontoise (1974), designed by Renzo Moro

Renzo Moro, born in 1933, is an architect.

After graduating from the École polytechnique fédérale de Zurich, Moro moved to France. He worked with Andre Remondet, Grand Prix de Rome. He then joined the Atea-Setap directed by Guy Lagneau, Michel Weill and Jean Dimitrijevic. In 1972 he was accepted as an associate of Atea, and in 1978 he became Administrator of AART-SETAP. In 1987, he created ARTEO, of which he is the main administrator. Since 2002 he has been a director of AART (Farah Architects Associates).

Moro specializes in management of large projects. He was co-winner of the 1997 Gold Ribbon Award in the "expressways" category for his views on the motorway A837 Rochefort-Saintes in Charente-Maritime. In 2004, he and his ARTEO team received the Grand Prize of Architecture for another motorway project.

== Achievements ==
- Various buildings and laboratories of the Centre d'Etudes Nucléaires de Cadarache,
- The EDF-GDF tower in Cergy, France.
- Treatment Plant counters GDF Béthunes
- Various achievements for the South of France Highways: Rest stops, regional office buildings, toll plazas, traffic control center.
- Under Aart-Setap, various hospitals in Kuwait.
- He also participated in planning studies in St. Quentin-en-Yvelines, under the plan Delouvrier (SDAU)
