= Lagneau =

Lagneau is a surname which may refer to:

- Guy Lagneau (1915–1996), French architect
- Nicolas Lagneau (fl. c. 1600–1650), French draftsman

== See also ==
- Lanio
