= I as in Icarus =

- Directed by: Henri Verneuil
- Written by: Didier Decoin; Henri Verneuil
- Produced by: Henri Verneuil
- Starring: Yves Montand
- Cinematography: Jean-Louis Picavet
- Edited by: Henri Lanoë
- Music by: Ennio Morricone
- Distributed by: AMLF
- Release date: 19 December 1979
- Running time: 120 minutes
- Country: France
- Language: French

I as in Icarus (French: I... comme Icare) is a 1979 French thriller film directed by Henri Verneuil. The title refers to Icarus, a Greek mythological figure.

== Selected cast ==
- Yves Montand as Henri Volney
- Michel Albertini as Luigi Lacosta
- Michel Etcheverry as Frédéric Heiniger
- Roger Planchon as Prof. David Naggara
- Pierre Vernier as Charly Feruda
- Jacques Denis as Despaul
- Jacques Sereys as Richard Mallory, head of the secret services
- Georges Staquet as Le gardien de l'immeuble d'assassinat
- Roland Amstutz as Pierre Gregory
- Georges Beller as Sam Kido
- Brigitte Lahaie as Ursula Hoffman
- Didier Sauvegrain as Karl Eric Daslow (anagram of Oswald)
- Nanette Corey as Mrs Volney
- Maurice Bénichou as Robert Sanio
- Roland Blanche as Garcia Santos
- Marcel Maréchal as Rivoli
- Jean Négroni as Carlos de Palma
- Michel Pilorgé as TV reporter

== Plot ==
The film's plot is based on the Kennedy assassination and subsequent investigation. The film begins with the assassination of President Marc Jarry, who is about to be inaugurated for a second six-year term of office. Henri Volney, state attorney and member of the commission charged with investigating the assassination (based on the Warren Commission) refuses to agree to the commission's final findings. According to the commission's rules, the member who refuses to go along with the conclusion of the investigation is tasked with re-investigating the assassination. Volney and his staff subsequently find many discrepancies in the official story, eventually uncovering a conspiracy between organized crime and the country's intelligence agency to assassinate president Jarry, that leads to Volney's murder himself.

== Fictional state ==
The action takes place in a fictional Western state where the spoken language is mainly French, but German, English and Spanish also are spoken. Its location, or even continent, is unknown. The capital city is made only of modern buildings, like Brasília. The political regime is presidential, the President being Marc Jarry at the beginning of the film. According to the plot, the assassination happens in May 1977.

== Location ==
The new town of Cergy in the northwestern suburbs of Paris was used as a filming location for the movie. The EDF-GDF tower designed by architect Renzo Moro is the building from which the shots were fired to assassinate president Marc Jarry. The governor's palace was the prefecture of the Val d'Oise. The huge room used for council meetings is the High Court of Justice. The long scene of the psychological experiment towards the end of the film, supposed to take place at the University of Laye, in fact takes place at ESSEC Business School in Cergy. This fictional Laye University is Yale University and the experiment shown in the film is the famous Milgram experiment, Stanley Milgram being a professor at Yale University. The filmmakers chose the modern and innovative architecture of the new town to avoid depicting any particular country.

== Accolades ==
The film was awarded the Grand prix du cinéma français for Best French Movie in 1979. It received five César Award nominations in 1980, including Best Movie, Best Actor (Yves Montand), Best Screenplay, Dialogue or Adaptation, Best Music and Best Production Design.
