= Museum of Modern Art André Malraux - MuMa =

Museum in Le Havre, France

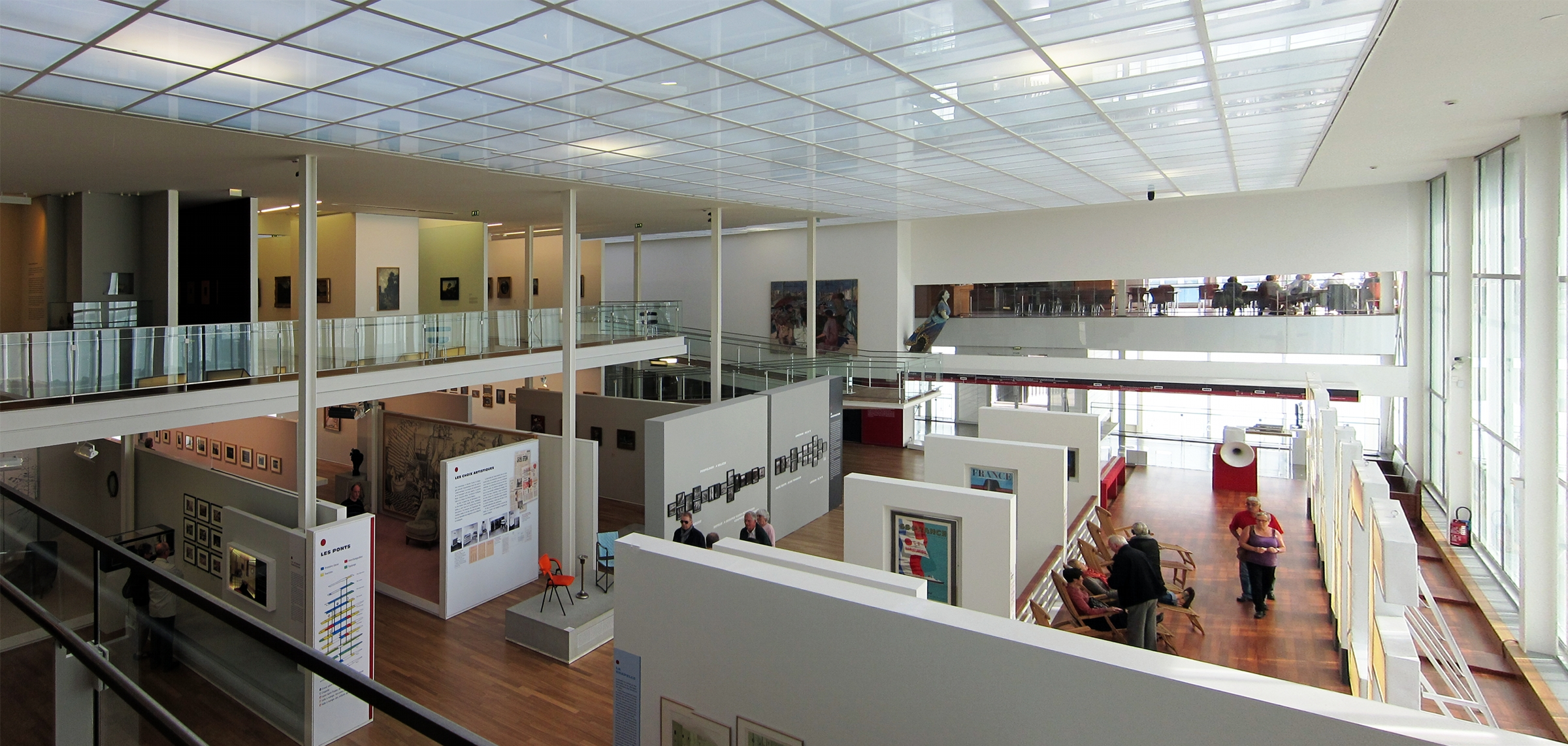
- Interior of the André Malraux Museum

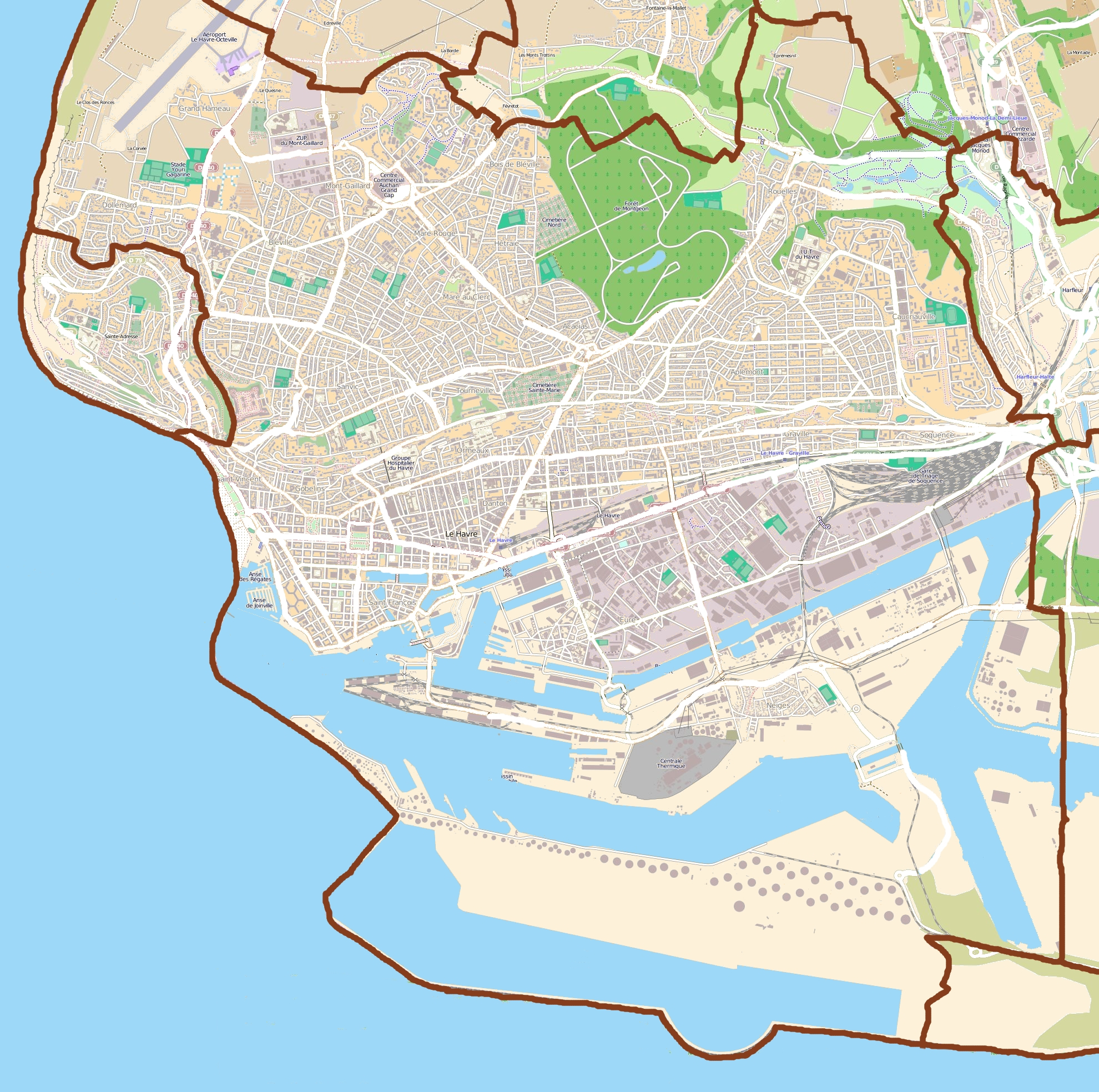
- Location in Le Havre map_caption = Location in Le Havre
- Established: 1961
- Location: Le Havre, France
- Coordinates: 49°29′06″N 0°06′09″E
- Type: Modern Art
- Website: muma-lehavre.fr

The Museum of Modern Art André Malraux - MuMa (French: Musée d'art moderne André Malraux, also known as Musée Malraux or simply MuMa) is a museum in Le Havre, France containing one of the nation's most extensive collections of impressionist paintings. It was designed by Atelier LWD, an architecture studio led by Guy Lagneau, Michel Weill and Jean Dimitrijevic. It is named after André Malraux, Minister of Culture when the museum was opened in 1961.

== History ==
Architect Guy Lagneau was chosen by Georges Salles, director of National Museums, to undertake construction between 1952 and 1961 of the first major museum built in France after World War II. Lagneau undertook the work in collaboration with Raymond Audigier, Michel Weill and Jean Dimitrejvic. The museum, inaugurated in 1961 by the Minister of Culture, André Malraux, was one of the key elements of the reconstruction of Le Havre. The museum was recently renovated by Emmanuelle and Laurent Beaudouin.

== Structure ==
The museum departs from the tradition of closed museums, designed by Lagneau in close cooperation with curator Reynold Arnoult to develop a flexible space in harmony with the marine environment. Facing the sea, the museum is a smooth and transparent assembly of glass and steel posed on a concrete pad. Installed above the roof, the aluminum louver blades were created by the engineer Jean Prouvé, providing control over the natural light that floods the building. Le Signal, a concrete sculpture by Henri Georges Adam, frames a fragment of the landscape and strongly emphasizes the exceptional situation of the building at the harbor entrance.

The large windows of the Malraux museum let in the highly variable light of the Normandy coast, a light that inspired many of the painters in the museum's collections. The light is carefully filtered before flooding inside the building. To the east, opal glass panes attenuate the rays of the morning sun. The facade to the west has three levels of filtration: a wall of glass screens on which horizontal lines have been printed intersects with the vertical lines of pivoted louvers, creating a grid of variable density. When light rays enter horizontally, blinds complete this scheme. On the ceiling, translucent square tiles filter the light reflected by the louver installed above the roof. Inclined blades break the sun and deliver a soft luminosity to the heart of the building.

== Collection ==
The museum houses a collection of art spanning the past five centuries, with the impressionist painting collection being the second most extensive in France after that of the Orsay Museum in Paris. There are paintings by Claude Monet and other artists who lived and worked in Normandy, as well as paintings by Camille Corot, Eugène Boudin (with the largest collection of his works in the world), Eugène Delacroix, Gustave Courbet, Edgar Degas, Édouard Manet, Pierre-Auguste Renoir, Paul Gauguin, Alfred Sisley, Camille Pissarro, Paul Sérusier and Édouard Vuillard. Modern art is also well represented with works by artists such as Henri Matisse, Albert Marquet, Raoul Dufy, Kees van Dongen, Fernand Léger, Alexej von Jawlensky and Nicolas de Staël. There is also an old masters section displaying paintings of Hendrik ter Brugghen, José de Ribera, Simon Vouet, Luca Giordano, Francesco Solimena, Hubert Robert, John Constable and Théodore Géricault. The collection of Olivier Senn (1864–1959), given to the museum in 2004, contains more than 205 paintings and many drawings by great masters of impressionism and modern art. Thanks to the donations, MuMa's collection of Impressionist works is today one of France's largest, and the public can now enjoy works by Renoir, Pissarro, Sisley, Degas, Courbet and Corot.

== Gallery ==
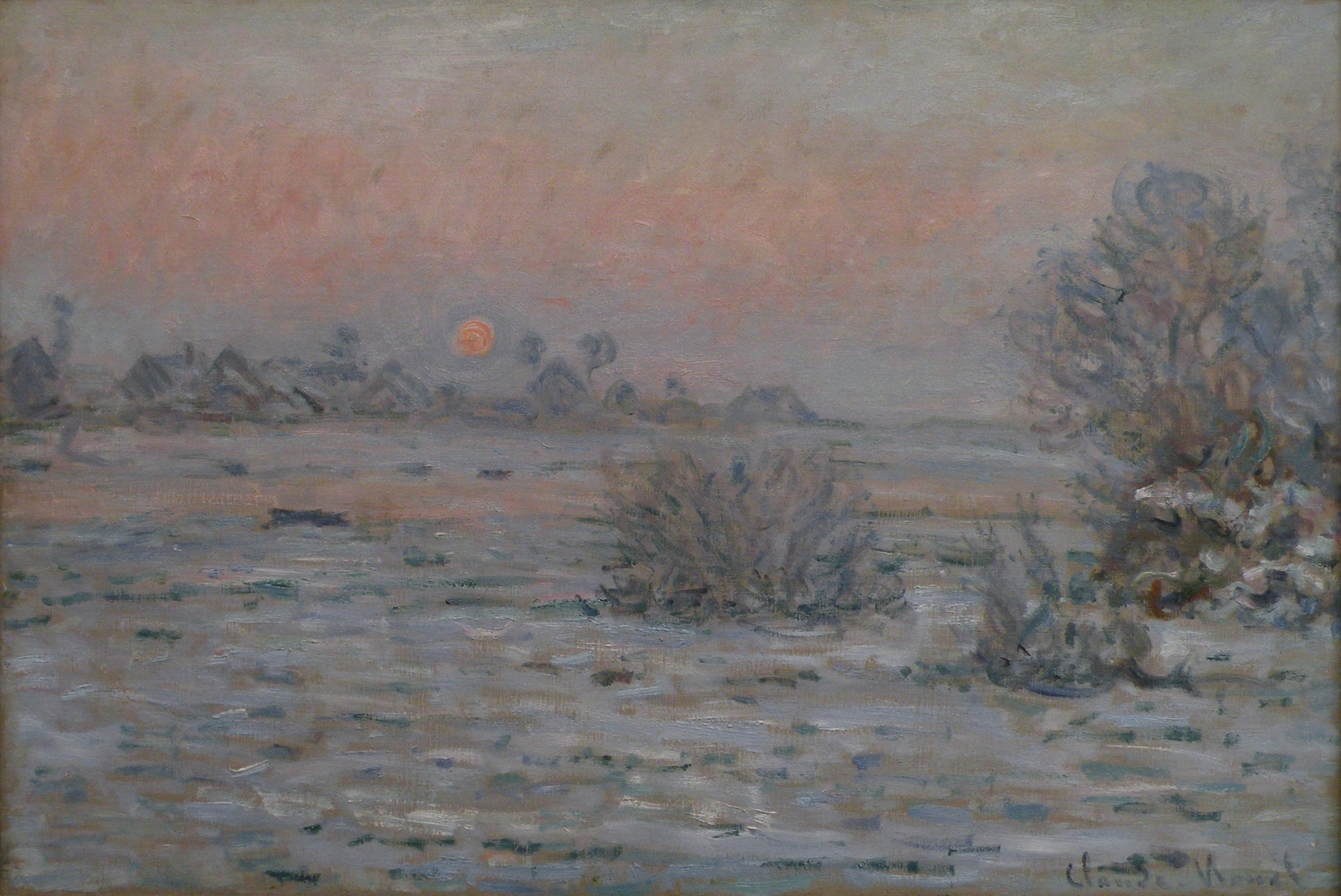
Claude Monet, Soleil d'hiver à Lavacourt (1879-1880)

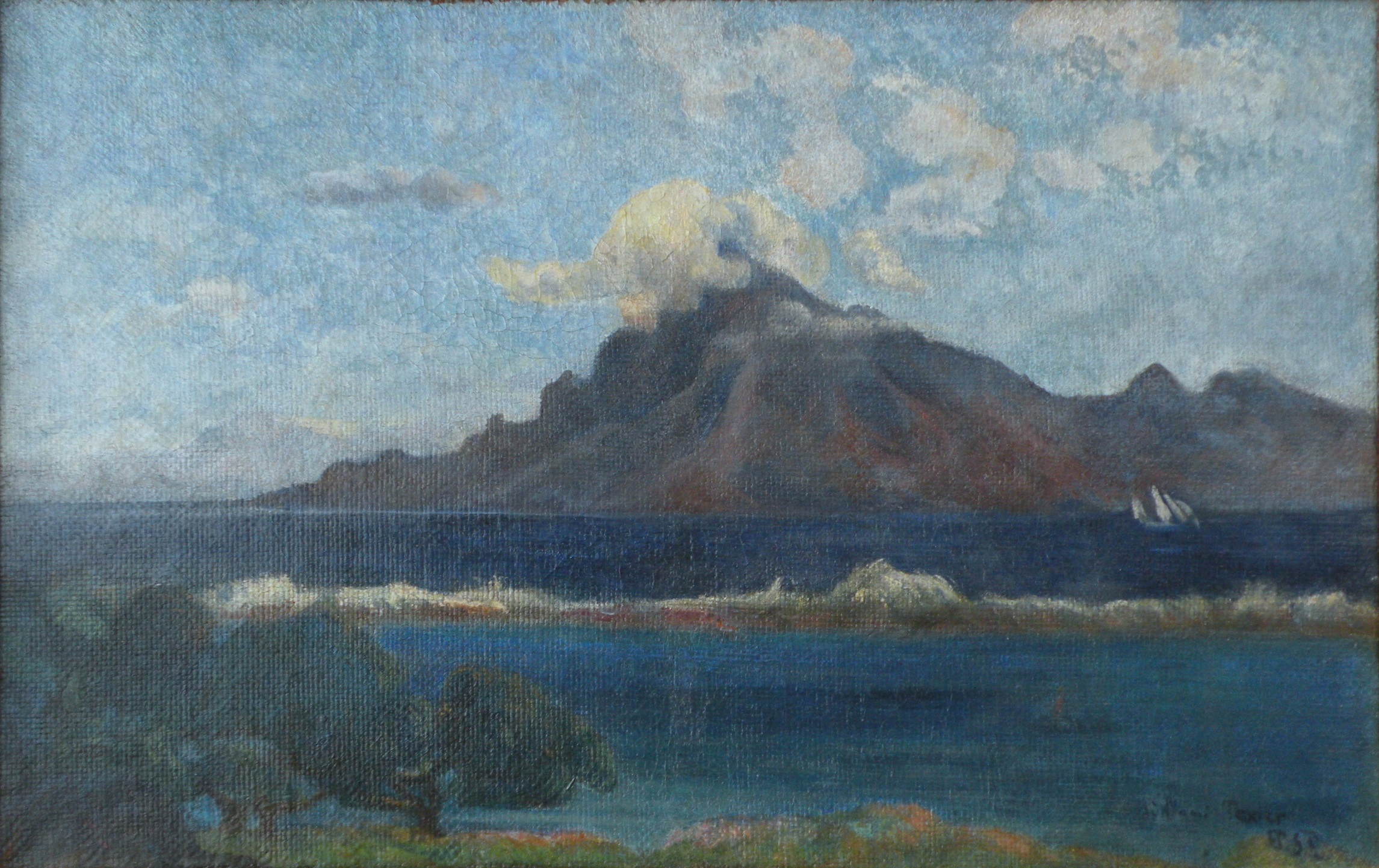
Paul Gauguin, Paysage de Te Vaa (1896)

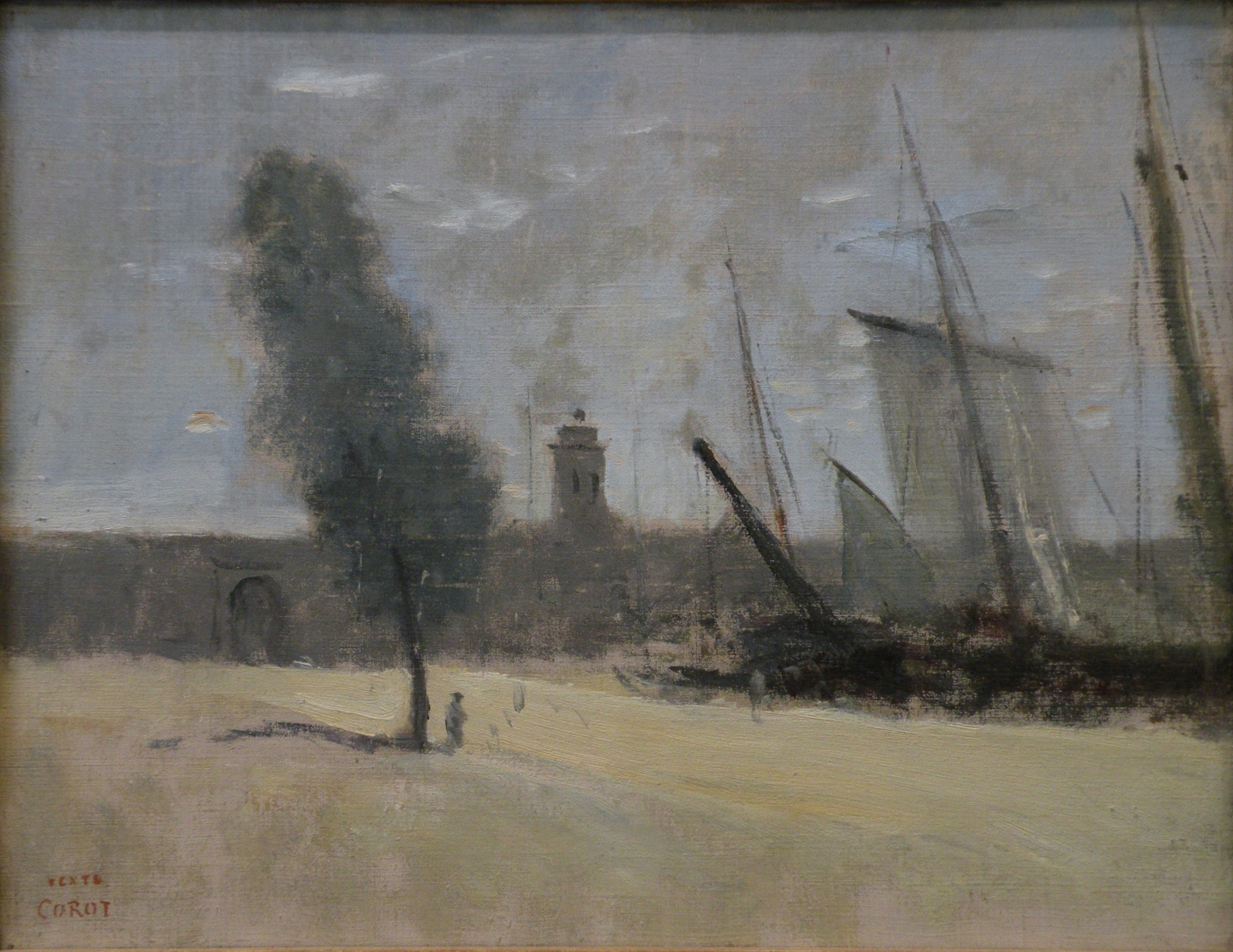
Jean-Baptiste Camille Corot, Dunkerque, remparts et porte d'entrée du port (1873)

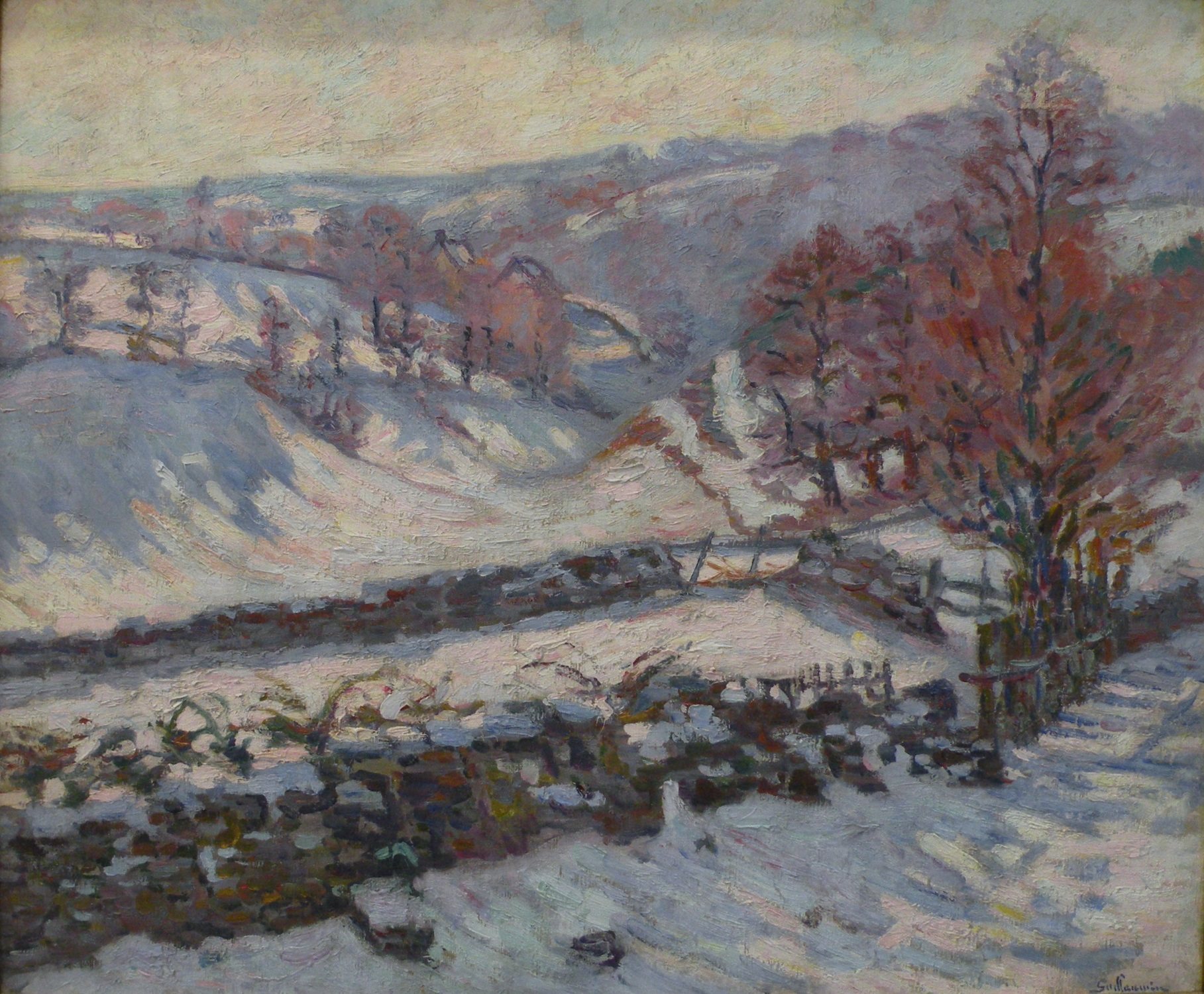
Armand Guillaumin, Paysage de neige à Crozant (vers 1895)

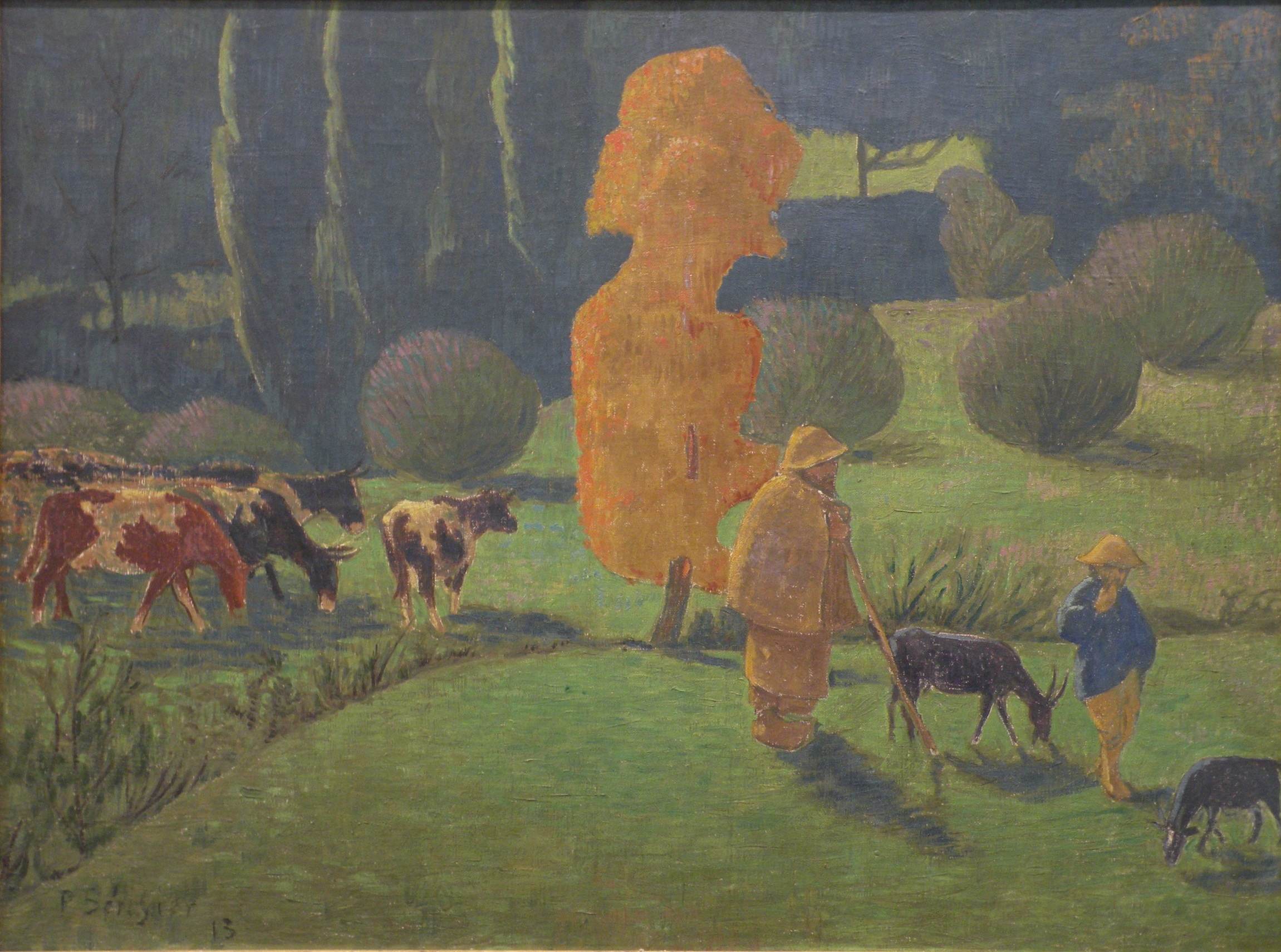
Paul Sérusier, Le Berger Corydon (1913)

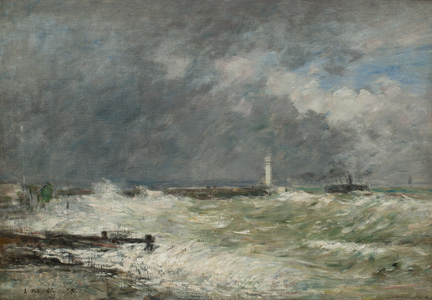
Eugène Boudin, Entrée des jetées du Havre par gros temps (1895)

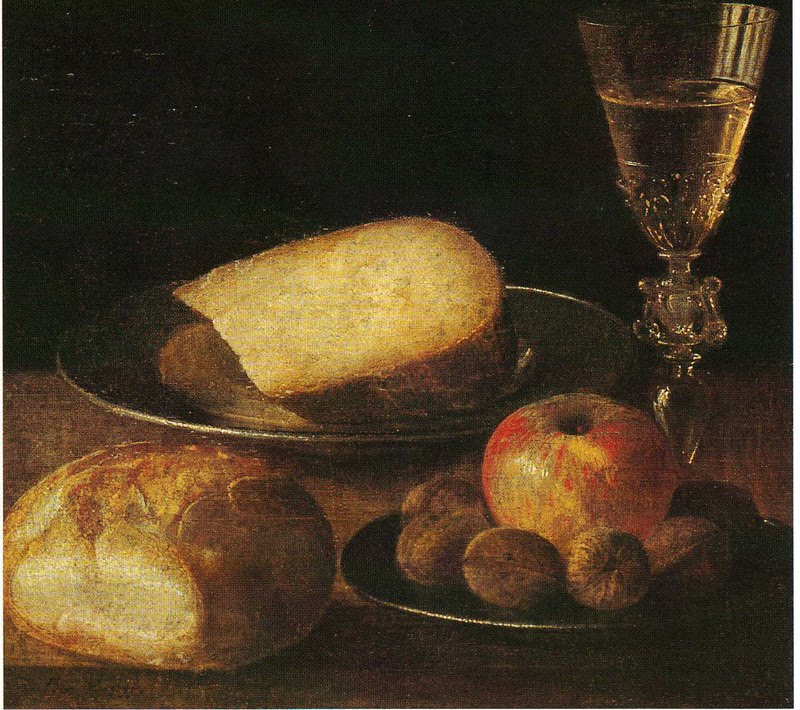
Sébastien Stoskopff, Nature morte aux fruits, fromage et pain

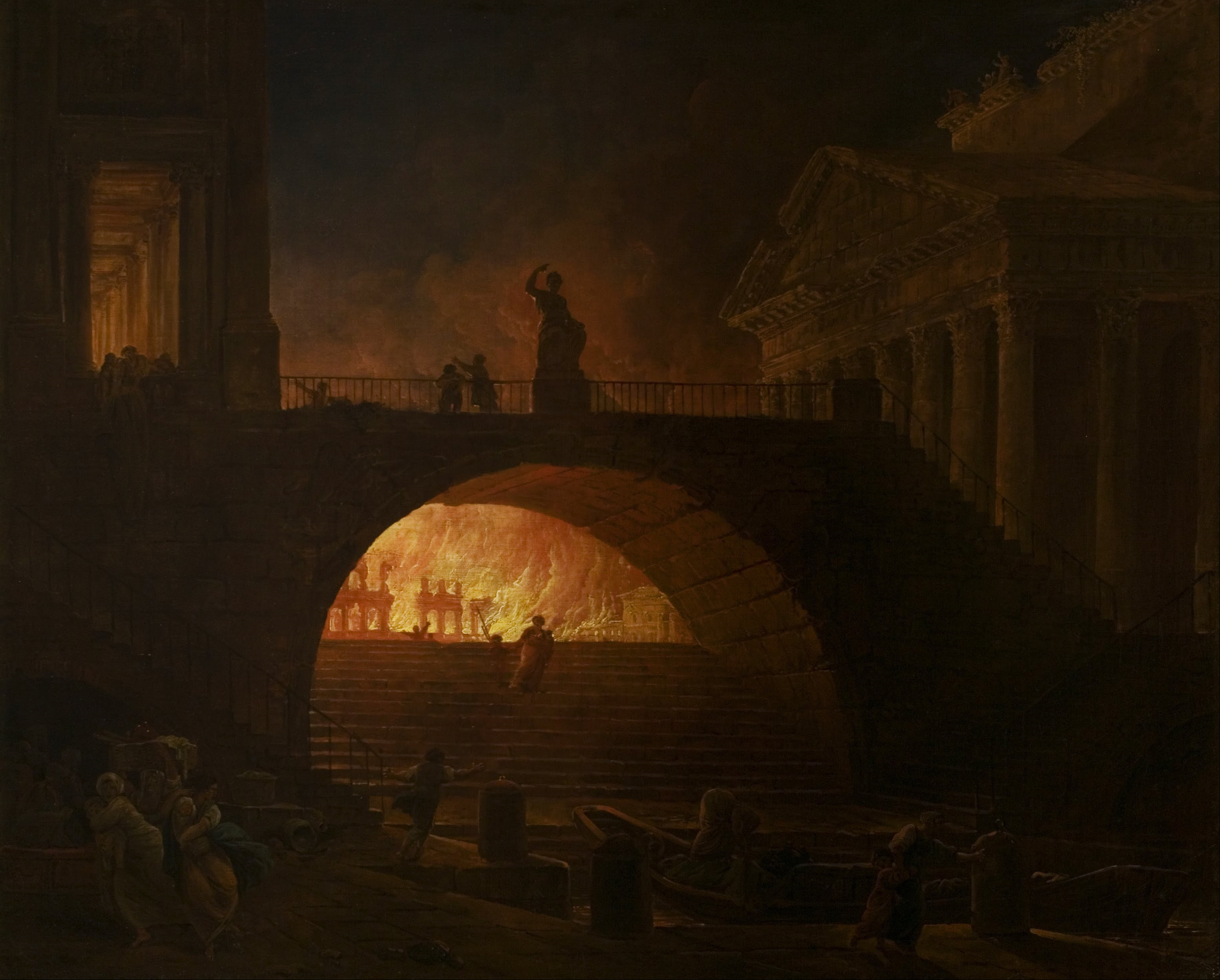
Hubert Robert, The Fire of Rome, 18 July 64 AD

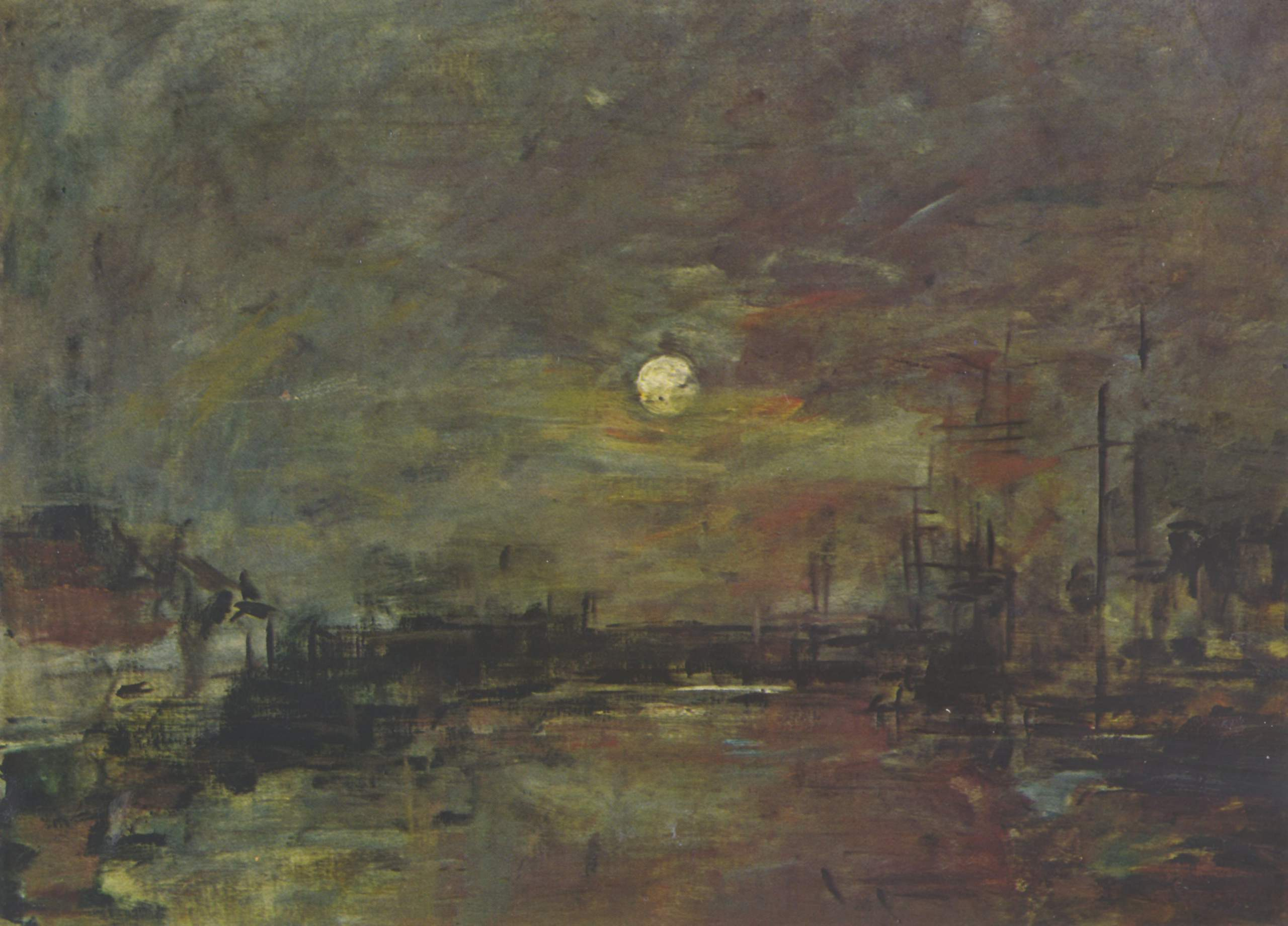
Louis-Eugène Boudin, Dusk over the port of Le Havre

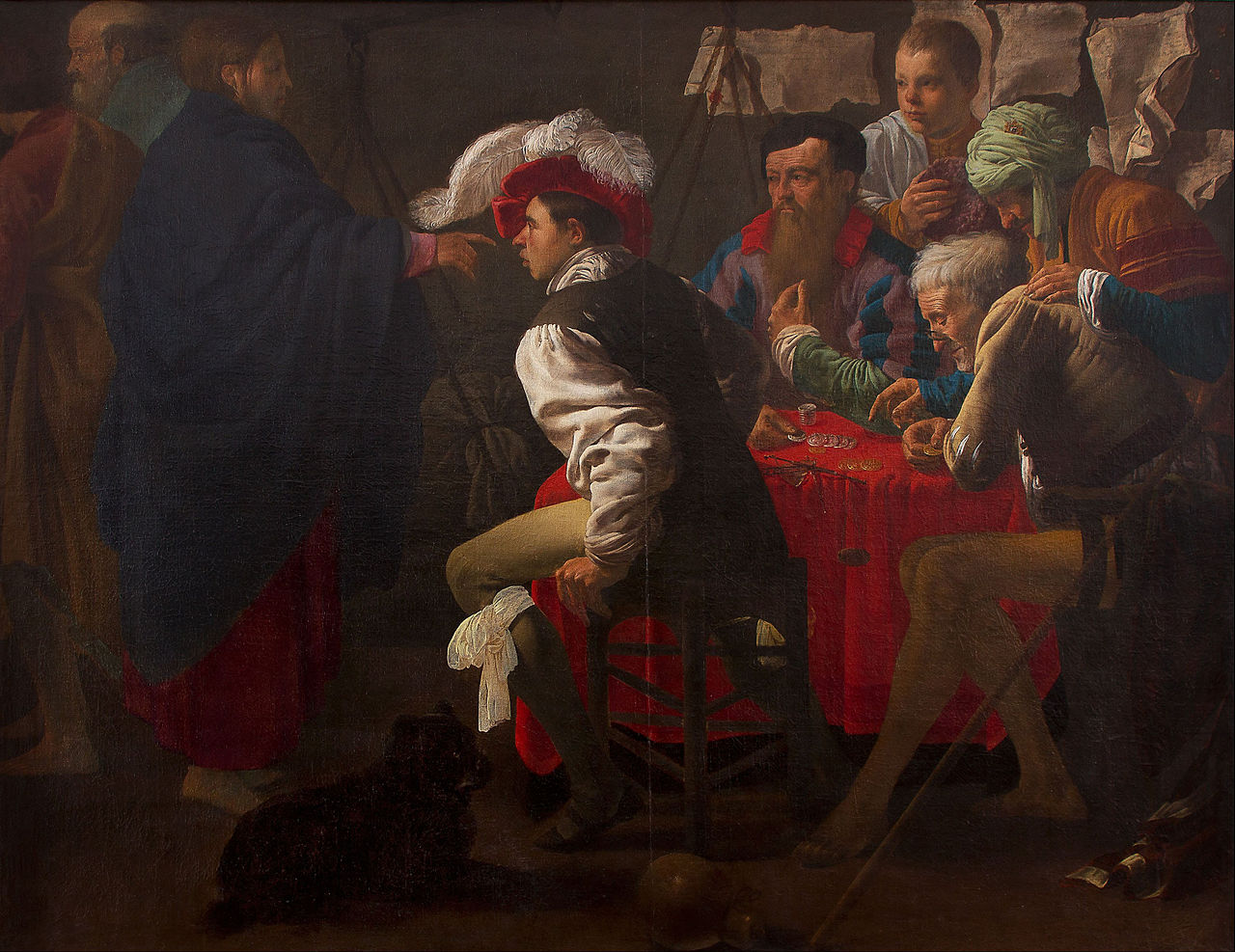
Hendrik ter Brugghen, The Calling of St. Matthew,

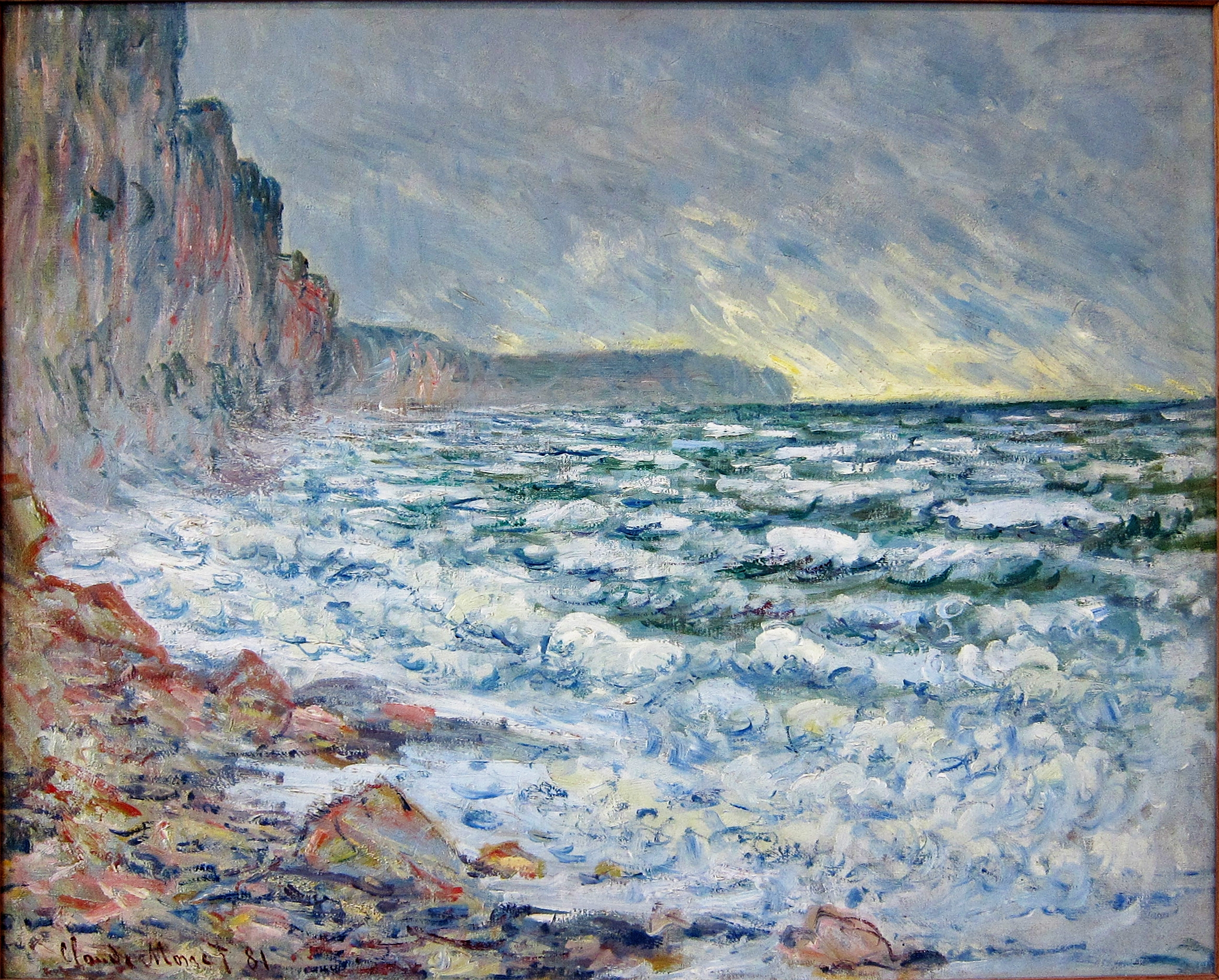
Claude Monet, Fécamp, bord de mer (1881)

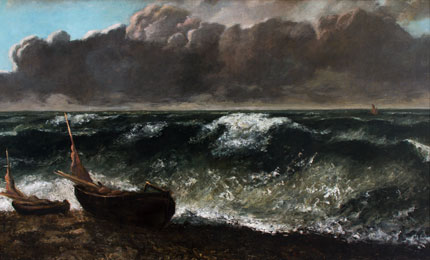
Gustave Courbet, The Wave (1869)

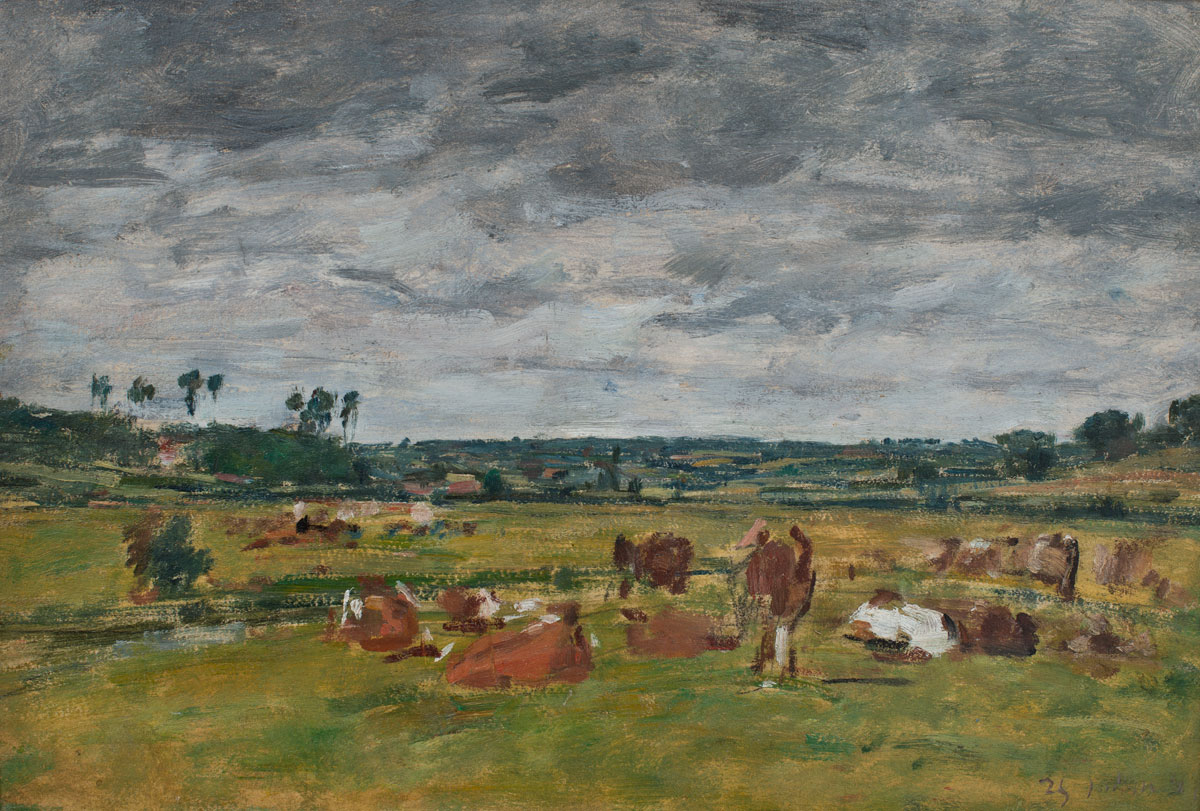
Eugène Boudin, Landscape with Cows (1881)

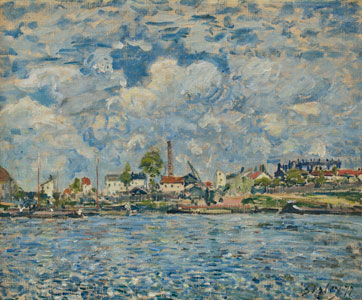
Alfred Sisley, La Seine au point du jour (1877)
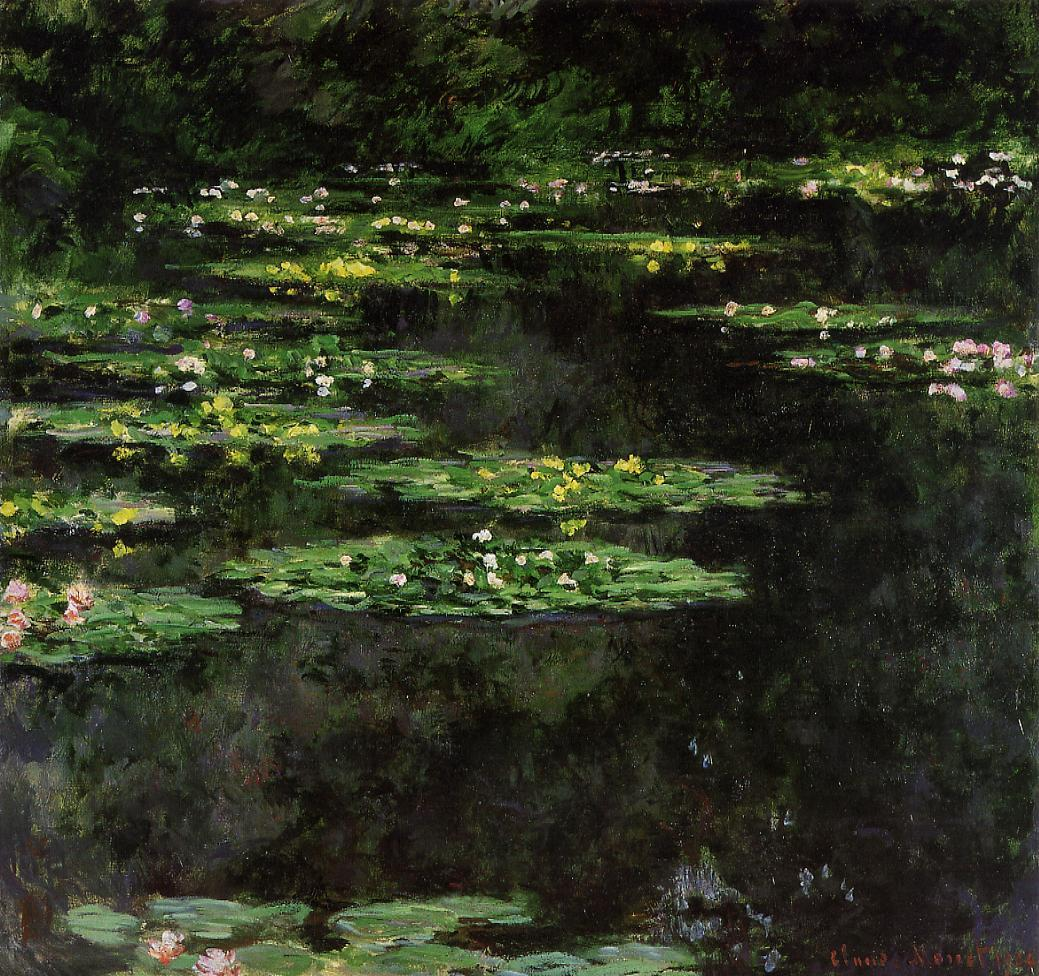
Claude Monet, Les Nymphéas (1906)

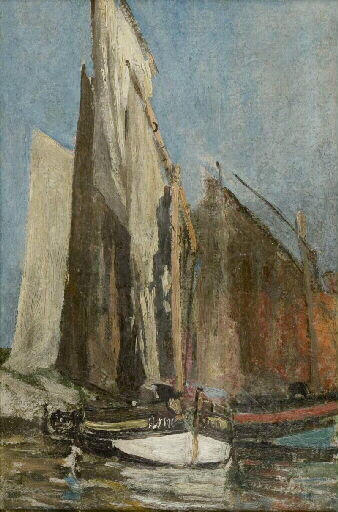
Eugène Boudin, Etude pour des barques de pêche

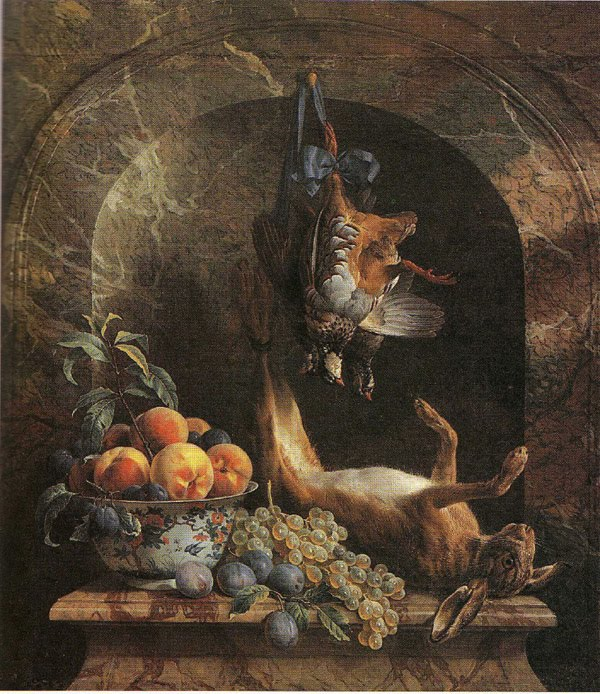
Alexandre-François Desportes, Nature morte aux fruits et au gibier

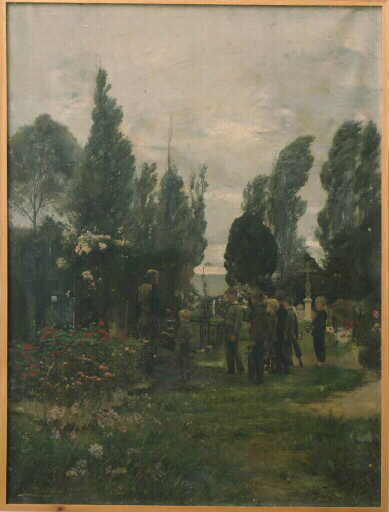
Édouard Joseph Dantan, Enterrement d'un enfant à Villerville (1884)

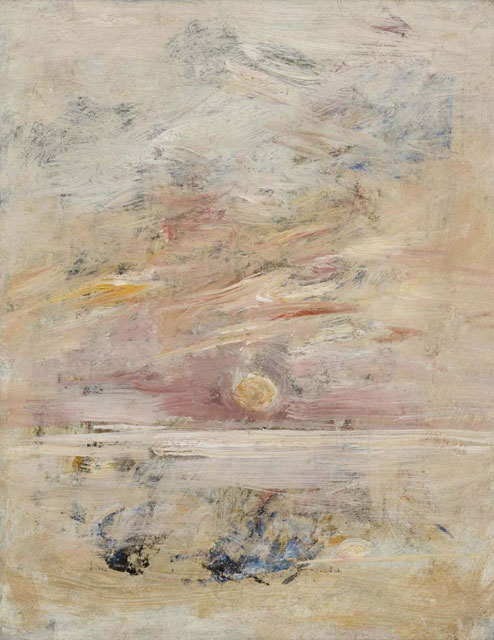
Eugène Boudin, Coucher de soleil au bord de la mer (circa 1888-1895)

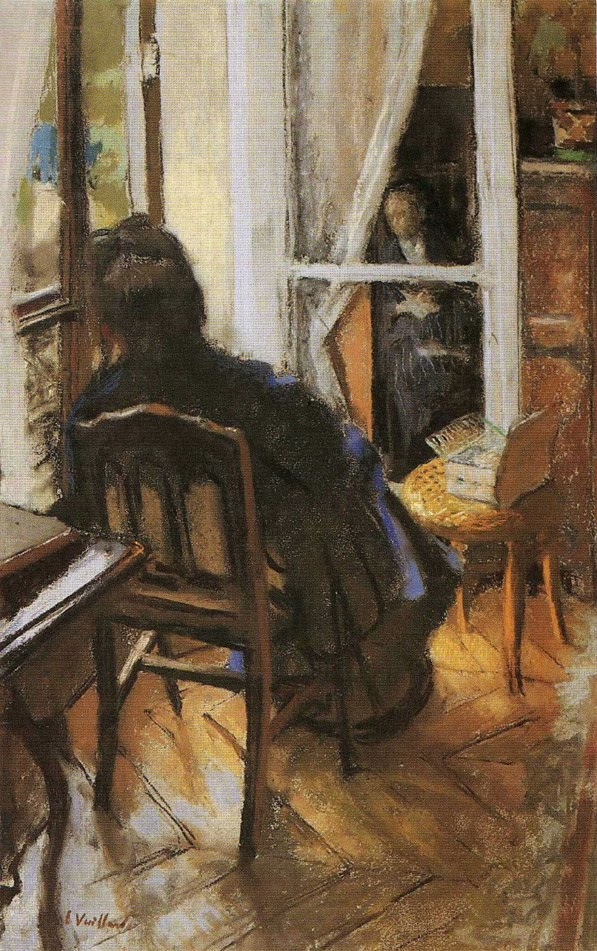
Édouard Vuillard, A la fenêtre

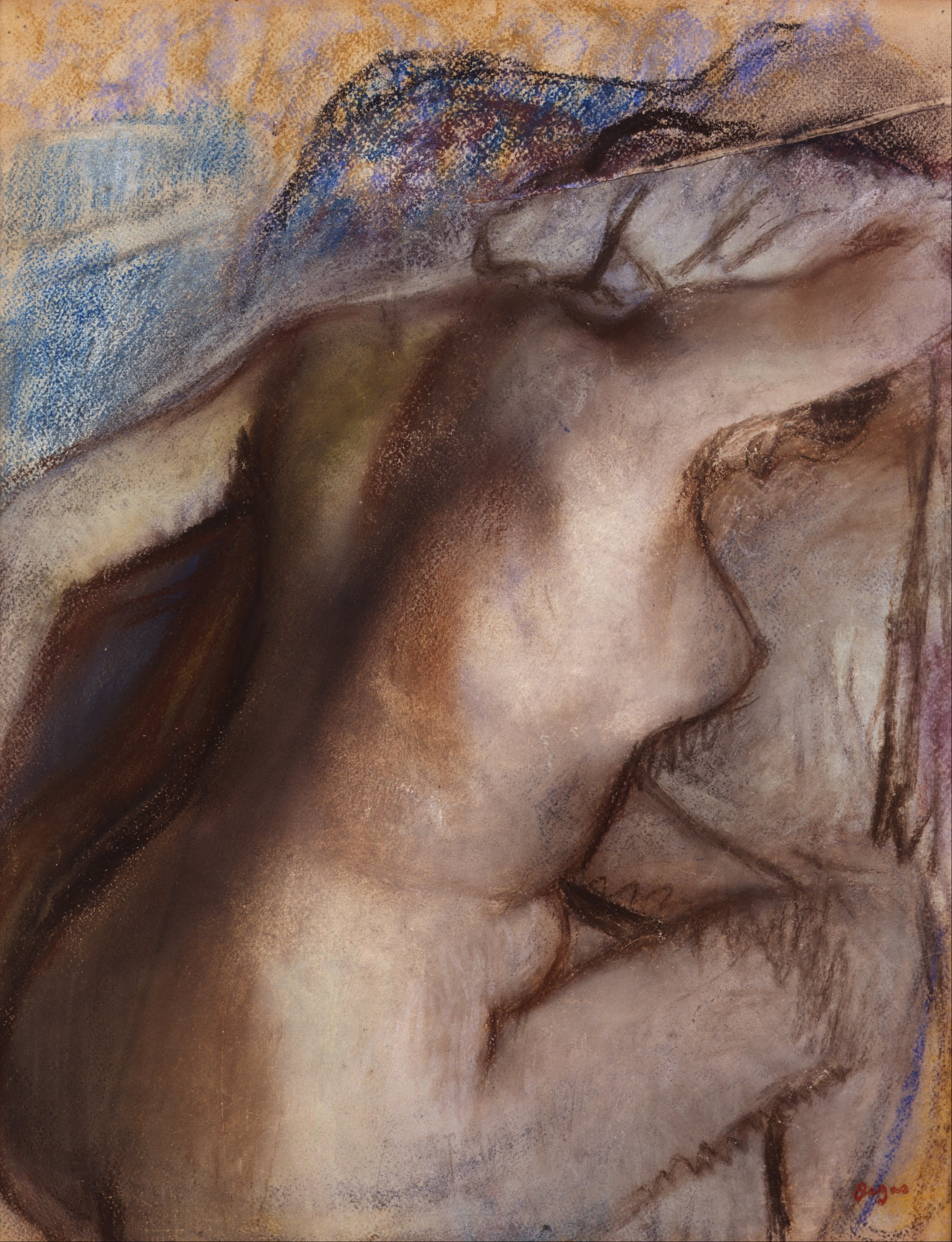
Edgar Degas, After the Bath, Woman Drying Herself (c. 1884–1886, reworked between 1890 and 1900)
