= Atelier LWD =

Architecture studio

Atelier LWD was an architecture studio led by Guy Lagneau, Jean Dimitrijevic and Michel Weill that was active from 1952 to 1985. It later took the name of "Atelier d'Etudes Architecturales" (ATEA) (Architectural Studies Workshop) with the addition of Paul Cordoliani, Henri Coulomb (1927–2006), Renzo Moro and Ivan Seifert (1926–2008). The studio originated many public buildings in France and Africa.

== History ==
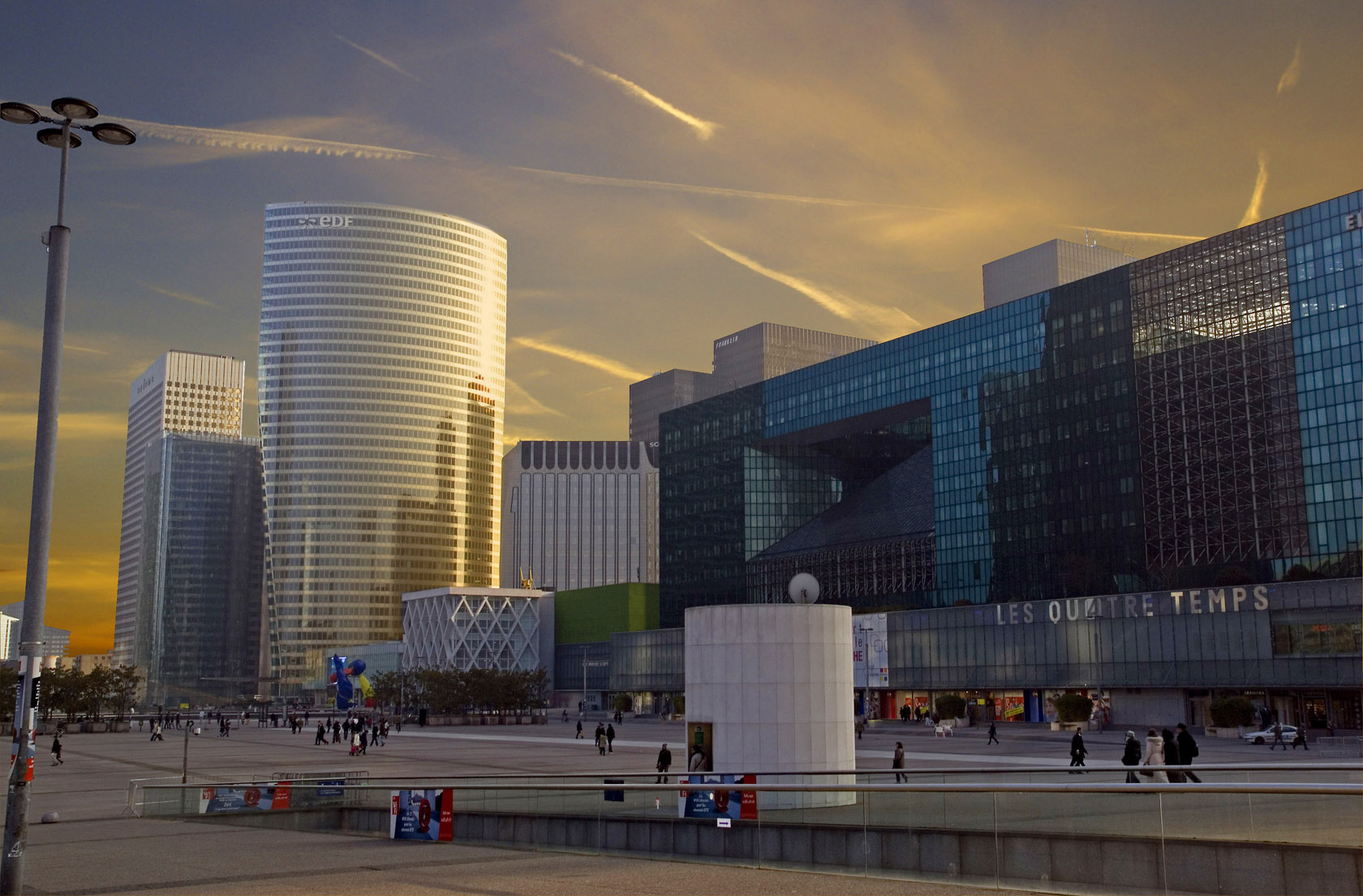
1985 La Défense, near Paris: the 1981 Quatre Temps shopping centre on a winter's afternoon

Guy Lagneau (1915–1996) and Michel Weill (1914–2001) met in the studio of Auguste Perret in the National School of Fine Arts established in 1943. They participated with Perret in the reconstruction of Le Havre from 1946, work that was later declared a World Heritage Site by UNESCO. Laigneau was particularly influenced by Scandinavian architecture, especially steel. Jean Dimitrijevic (1926–2010) joined the agency in 1947 after meeting Guy Lagneau in a Fine Arts workshop he was running. He graduated in 1957 and completed his training at the Massachusetts Institute of Technology in 1959. He then became a partner of the workshop.

The architects created the ATEA in association with a consulting firm, Société d'études techniques et d'aménagements planifiés (SETAP). ATEA-SETAP was involved in many planning operations in Africa, including Guinea, Mauritania and Senegal. At the same time, they accepted numerous public commissions from museums, prefectures, and shopping centers in France. Lagneau also participated as an individual in preparation of master plans and urban development in the Paris region between 1962 and 1965, contributing to creation of new towns.

On many occasions the agency worked with Jean Prouvé in creating innovative metal structures and with the designer Charlotte Perriand for interior design.

== Key achievements ==
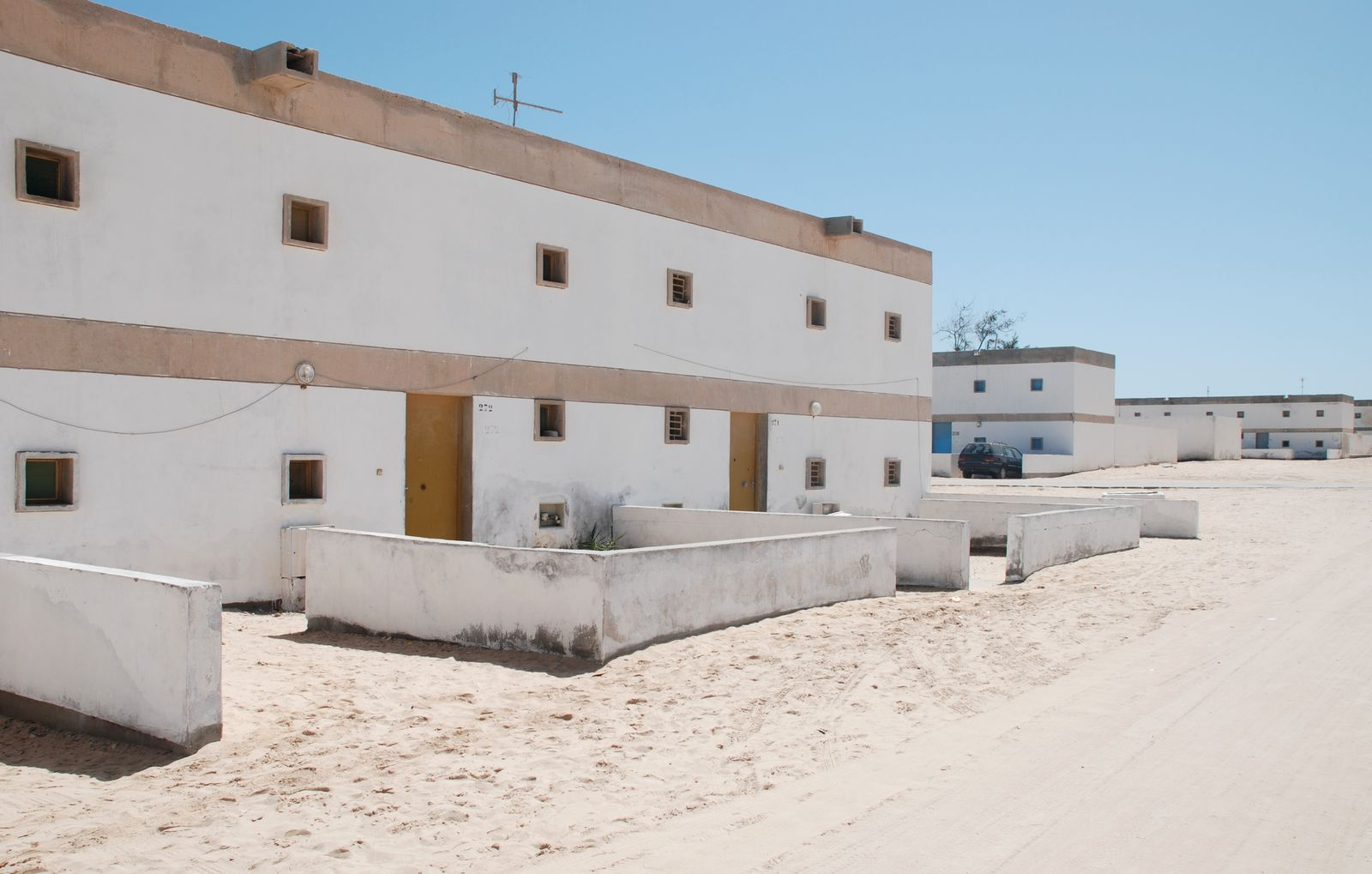
1958 Houses at Cansado, Mauritania.

The partners were responsible for many significant projects, including:

- 1952–1955: Paul Bert d'Aplemont School group in Le Havre.
- 1953–1954: Hotel de France (Conakry) with Jean Prouvé and Charlotte Perriand
- 1955–1961: Musée des Beaux-Arts André Malraux in Le Havre (with Jean Prouvé and Charlotte Perriand)
- 1957: Ore port of Boké in Guinea.
- 1957: Taiba Mbaye Senegal.
- 1958: Prototype of the House of the Sahara for the Ideal Home Exhibition at the Grand Palais in Paris with Jean Prouve and Charlotte Perriand (destroyed).
- 1958–1959: "Les Buffets" housing on the Avenue du Marechal Foch in Fontenay-aux-Roses (Hauts-de-Seine), in collaboration with John Perrottet
- 1958: City of Cansado in Mauritania.
- 1960: Agency office building for Air France, rue Scribe in the 9th district of Paris, in collaboration with Charlotte Perriand
- 1961: The town of Maspalomas, Gran Canaria, Spain
- 1963: Office building of the Union de Transports Aériens (UTA) Boulevard Malesherbes in Paris
- 1964–1967: Faculty of Letters of Nice
- 1965: Primary School Balizy in Longjumeau (Essonne) in collaboration with Jean Prouvé
- 1965–1967: Normal School and High School of Bamako in Mali (1200 students)
- 1965–1985: Administrative center of Evry (Essonne) (Prefecture, County Council, Courthouse).
- 1971–1976: Administrative offices, joint distribution centers EDF-GDF, Val-d'Oise
- 1971–1987: Vacation rentals Marines Cogolin
- 1972–1985: Les Quatre Temps shopping center at La Défense near Paris.
- 1979–1982: Inner station of Cergy-Pontoise (Val-d'Oise), in association with Ivan Seifert
- 1981–1985: Office of the Bank of France in Marne-la-Vallée (Seine-et-Marne)
