= EDF-GDF tower =

Coordinates: 49°02′08″N 2°04′45″E

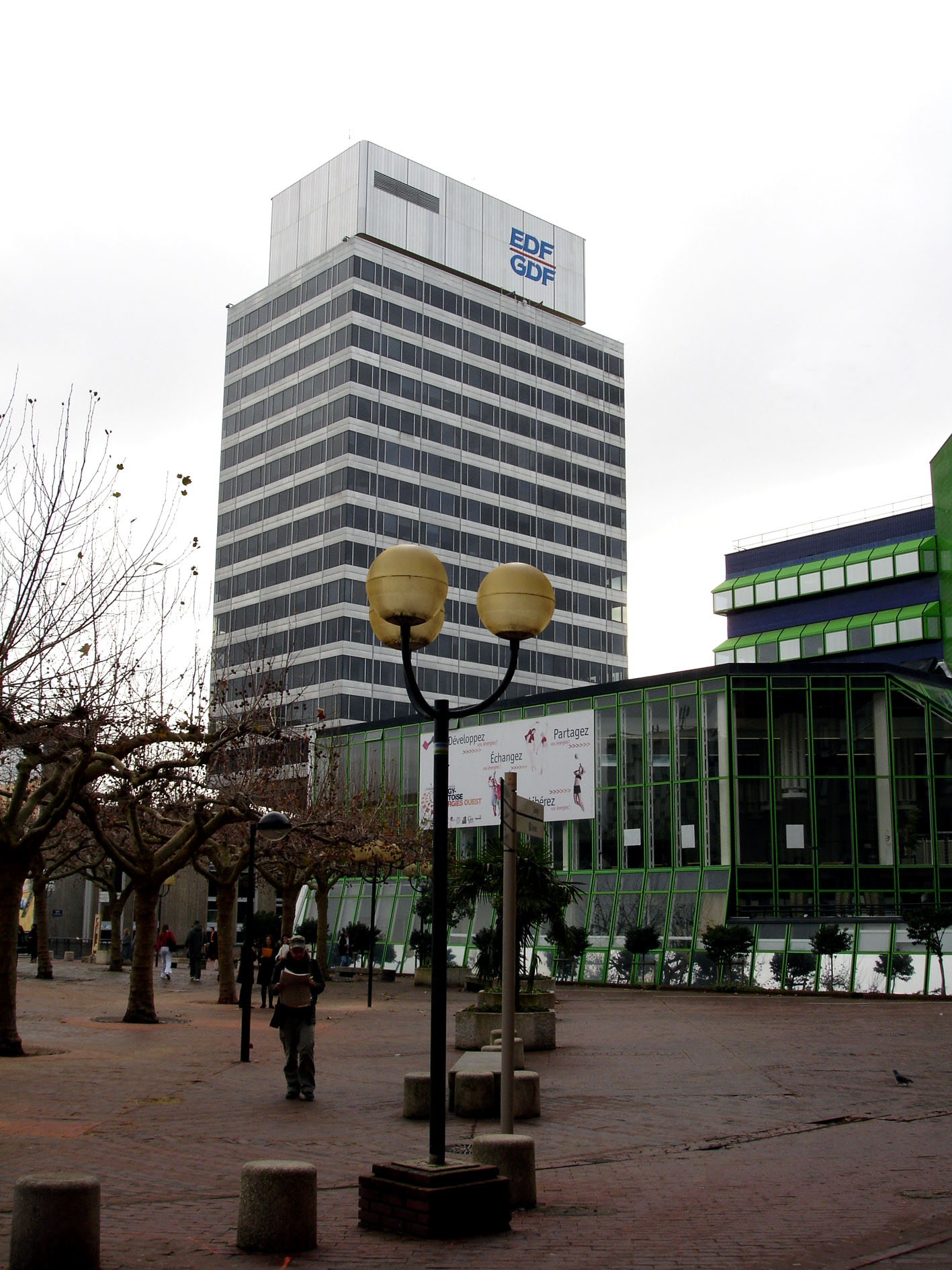
Tour EDF, Cergy-Pontoise (France)

The EDF-GDF tower is an office building built in 1974 in the heart of the new town of Cergy, France, in the Cergy Prefecture business and administrative district.

== History ==
The building was emptied in 2015. Engie (new name of EDF) announced it would sell the building. In March 2017, it was announced that the office building would be turned into a residential building and repurposed as a dorm for students. Some heavy work to modify the structure of the building were planned, but the exterior look is supposed to remain the same.

== Description ==
Its architect is Renzo Moro. The tower is 85.3 metres (280 ft) high, with 14 floors. It was built to house the sister companies Électricité de France (EDF) and Gaz de France (GDF).

For fire management, the tubular frame of the tower is filled with water and a water tank is located on top of the building. The top 3 floors of the tower (no windows) are dedicated to the technical services of the building. This construction style was patented by the colonel Mutin and built by the construction company Durafour. It was the first building with this construction style in France.

== In popular culture ==
The tower was used as a filming location in Henri Verneuil's film I... comme Icare released in 1979, starring Yves Montand. This is the tower from which the shots were fired to assassinate president Marc Jarry.
