= Michel Weill =

French architect

- Born: 31 August 1914; Paris 9th arrondissement
- Died: 21 July 2001 (aged 86); Boulogne-Billancourt
- Occupation: Architect
- Buildings: Musée d'art moderne André-Malraux

Michel Weill (31 August 1914 – 21 July 2001) was a French architect who co-founded the Atelier LWD with Guy Lagneau and Jean Dimitrijevic, and was involved in many major projects in France and Africa. He worked with Lagneau and Dimitrijevic on the Musée-Maison de la Culture at Le Havre, a glass box surrounded by mechanical solar-control devices. Another project with Lagneau and Dimitrijevic was the Hôtel de France in Conakry, Guinea, a long building flanked by a rotunda. It was built of reinforced concrete panels with aluminum shutters.

Michel Weill was the nephew of Grand Rabbi Julien Weill and the banker André Meyer.

== Bibliography ==
- Michel Weill (2001). A quoi sert l'architecture ?. Milan. ISBN 2-7459-0419-1.
- Michel Weill (2002). L'Urbanisme. Milan. ISBN 978-2-7459-0850-6.
