= Nicolas Lagneau =

French draftsman

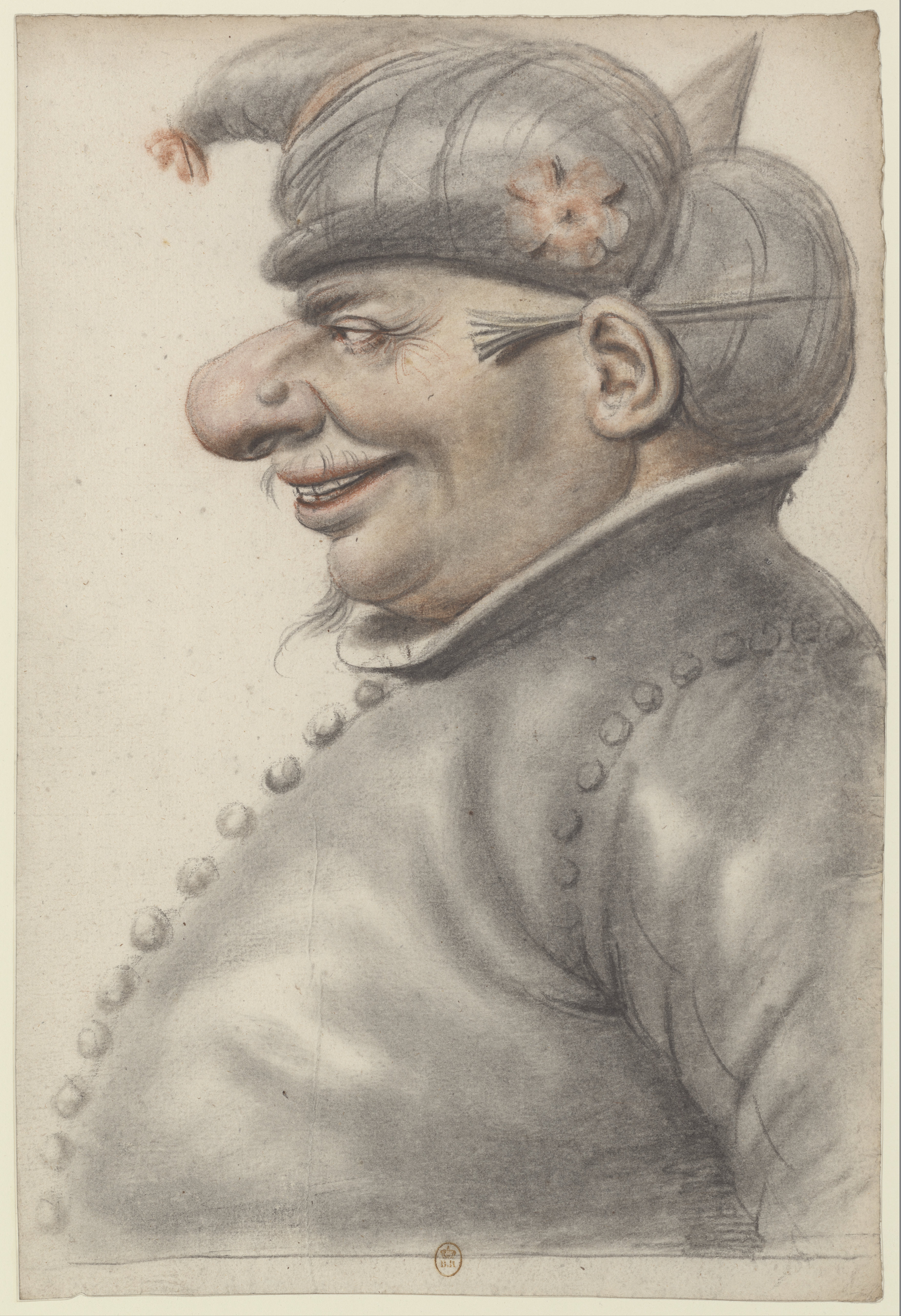
Grotesque Man Wearing a Turban by Nicolas Lagneau, Bibliothèque nationale de France

Nicolas Lagneau (fl c. 1600–1650) was a French draftsman noted for his portrait drawings. He was especially interested in grotesque physiognomies, which he drew in meticulous detail either from models or his imagination. His drawings are usually executed in black and red chalk, sometimes with the addition of blue or yellow gouache. In their heightened realism, and emphasis on facial expressions, wrinkles, and deformities, Lagneau's portraits reveal the influence of Rembrandt's early works.

Lagneau is not known to have painted. His drawn portraits, which were widely copied and imitated in his time, attest to a fashion for drawings of "expressive faces", which were assembled into albums by collectors.

Lagneau's drawings are plentiful in French and US museums.
