= Jean Dimitrijevic =

French architect

- Born: 1926
- Died: 2010 (aged 83–84)
- Occupation: Architect
- Buildings: Musée d'art moderne André-Malraux; Quatre Temps shopping centre

Jean Dimitrijevic (1926–2010) was a French architect who worked with Guy Lagneau and Michel Weill in the Atelier LWD on many projects. Among these projects was the Musée-Maison de la culture du Havre, an innovative museum built between 1955 and 1960.

== Career outline ==
Born in 1926, Dimitrijevic joined the French army during World War II (1939–1945). After the war, he began working as an apprentice architect in 1947, and became a junior partner at the Atelier LWD, an architectural firm created by Guy Lagneau and Michel Weill in 1952. He studied under Guy Lagneau at the École des Beaux-Arts in Paris, graduating as an architect planner in 1957. In 1959 he studied for a year at the Department of Architecture at MIT in the United States. During the thirty years of activity at LWD, the studio won many awards, serving private firms and the state with a complete process of design and implementation of architecture and overall urban planning. The studio was recognized as highly innovative.

== Work in Africa ==
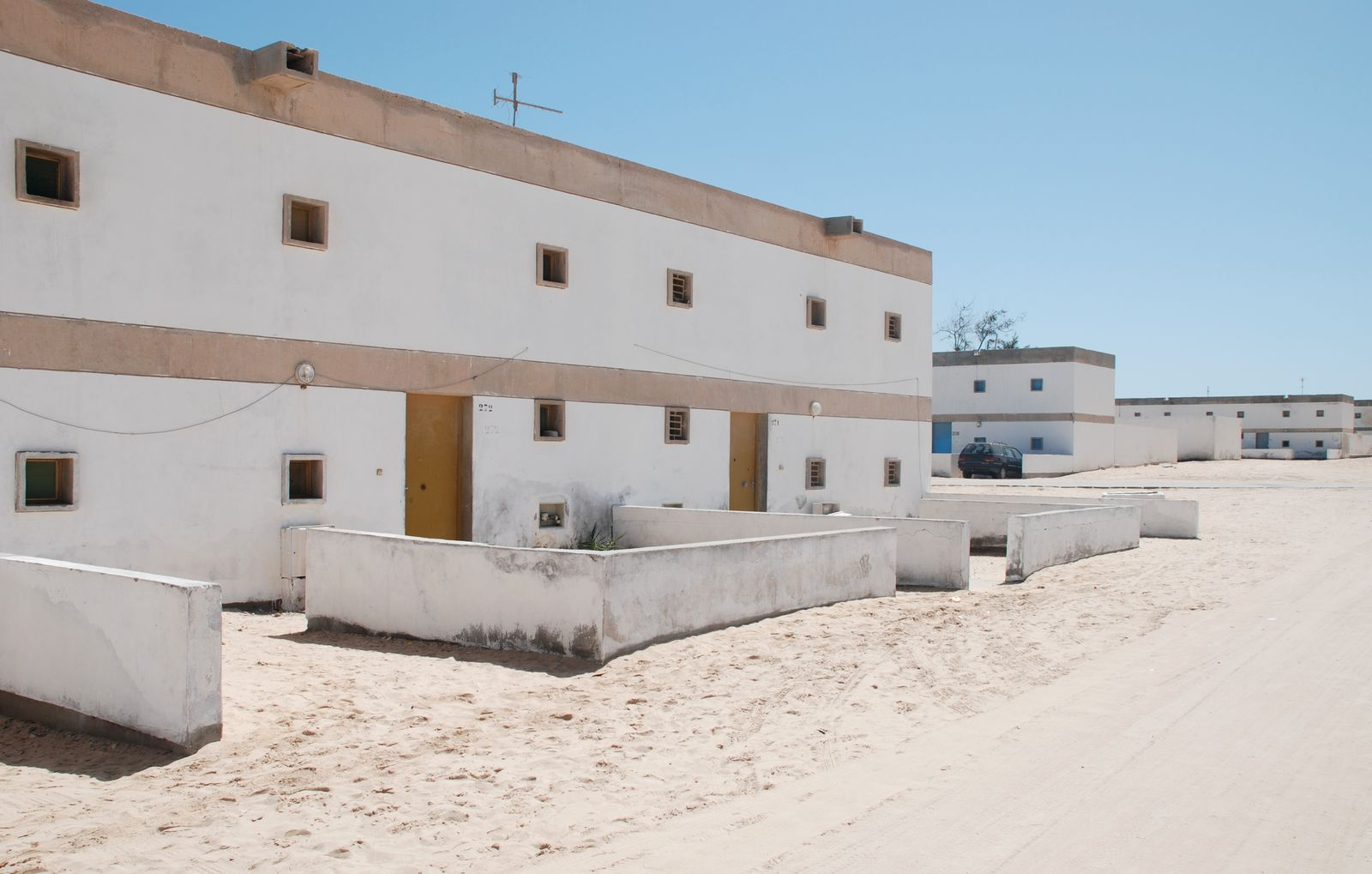
Houses at Cansado, Mauritania.

Dimitrijevic was involved in several projects in Africa, including the LWD's first project, the 1953 design of the Hôtel de France in Conakry, Guinea. In this building the architects created a frame building with concrete walls lined with precast granite, with rooms designed to promote natural ventilation. Other projects including planning the mineral port of Boké in Guinea (1955), the city of Taïba Mbaye in Senegal (1957), the Sandgarejdi mine in Guinea (1957), the development plan for Abidjan in Côte d'Ivoire (1959) and a program for industrial expansion in Cameroon (1964).

Dimitrijevic was in charge of design, planning and construction of the mining town of Cansado in Mauritania between 1959 and 1963, with 750 furnished houses. For the sake of economy, there were few French workers, mostly Moors, Canary Islanders and Senegalese. The project was logistically and technically demanding. Construction used precast lightweight concrete blocks imported from Senegal, and other concrete forms such as joists and railings that were manufactured on the site. Import of manufactured goods was kept to the minimum. The city, built quickly, gave an impression of strength and architectural cohesion.

== Work in France ==
Dimitrijevic worked with Lagneau, Weill and Raymond Audigler on the design of the Museum of Modern Art at Le Havre, a box of glass, steel and aluminum with light, flexible spaces. The building was awarded the Prix Reynolds in 1962. It marked the start of a long collaboration with Jean Prouvé and Charlotte Perriand. Lagneau, Weill, Dimitrijevic, Prouvé and Perriand collaborated on the Maison de Sahara in 1958, a prototype developed in Paris in 1958 showing an innovative approach to solving the problem of extreme heat. The prototype building included cabins that were air-conditioned in the daytime and open to the desert at night, contained within a tent that provided the central living space.

Later work included the Prefecture and the Palace of Justice of Évry, Essonne, with Weill and Lagneau in 1975. He designed the Marinas of Cogolin in the Var department, a new departure for Dimitrijevic, and collaboration on the 120,000 square metres (1,300,000 sq ft) Quatre-Temps shopping center in La Défense, a business district of Paris, which opened in 1981.
