= Guy Lagneau =

French architect

- Auguste Perret surrounded by architects Pierre-Edouard Lambert, Guy Lagneau and Alexandre Persitz in Le Havre on 27 September 1947
- Born: 1915
- Died: 16 December 1996 (aged 80–81)
- Occupation: Architect
- Buildings: Musée d'art moderne André-Malraux; Quatre Temps shopping centre

Guy Lagneau (1915 – 16 December 1996) was a French architect, one of the founders of Atelier LWD, who was involved in many major projects in France and Africa.

== Early years ==
Guy Lagneau was born in 1915. He was a pupil and admirer of the architect Auguste Perret, whose later reconstruction of Le Havre (which was devastated during World War II) was declared a World Heritage Site by UNESCO. He participated in setting up the Pavillon of Modern Times for the International Exposition of 1937. As a student at the École des Beaux-Arts, in the Perret-Courtois studio, he designed a hotel at the edge of a lake, with a symmetrical but rhythmic structure of exposed reinforced concrete. This design was published in 1942 in a polemic article written by Michel Roux-Spitz, an opponent of traditionalist architecture. Lagneau played a very active role in the 3rd Perret studio in the 1942–1954 period, following the advice of Le Corbusier.

Lagneau was among the architects who collaborated with Perret on the project to rebuild Le Havre, involved in the northern section. During the summer of 1945, he worked with André Le Donné, André Hermant and José Imbert to prepare the first draft of the new city plan, synthesizing the work of other architects, from which Perret developed the final plan submitted on 26 September 1945.

== 1950s ==
Lagneau broke with the architectural principles of his master, Perret. He believed in light architecture, more like that of Le Corbusier. Through his work in Africa, he became deeply interested in the relationship between architecture and climate. In 1952 he founded the Atelier LWD, with Michel Weill and Jean Dimitrijevic, a partnership that was active from 1952 to 1987. Their first major project was the Hotel de France in Conakry, Guinea, designed in 1953 and completed in 1954. This was a long, seven-storied building, supported by pillars, with a restaurant located in a circular pavilion. The interior and furniture were designed by Charlotte Perriand and Jean Prouvé in 1953.

In March 1958, Lagneau unveiled the House of the Sahara, a home-made prototype made in collaboration with Weill, Dimitrijevic, Prouvé and Perriand. In this work, they proposed a modern answer to the question of housing under extreme climatic conditions by applying the principle of separation. The house consisted of cabins cooled by air-conditioning in the day, but open at night onto the desert, all housed in a large tent that creates the central living space. This project was followed in 1958 by studies of tropical habitat in Guinea, resulting in a report which proposed concrete solutions for living in the humid tropics.

== Museum of Modern Art at Le Havre ==
Lagneau was chosen by Georges Salles, director of National Museums, to undertake construction between 1952 and 1961 of the first major museum built in France after World War II, the Museum of Modern Art at Le Havre. Lagneau undertook the work in collaboration with Raymond Audigier, Michel Weill and Jean Dimitrejvic. The museum, inaugurated in 1961 by the Minister of Culture, André Malraux, was one of the key elements of the reconstruction of Le Havre.

The museum departs from the tradition of closed museums cut off from the exterior world. Lagneau worked closely with the curator, Reynold Arnoult to develop a flexible space in harmony with the marine environment. Facing the sea, the museum is a smooth and transparent assembly of glass and steel posed on a concrete pad. Installed above the roof, the aluminum louver blades were created by the engineer Jean Prouvé, providing control over the natural light that floods the building. Le Signal, a concrete sculpture by Henri Georges Adam, frames a fragment of the landscape and strongly emphasizes the exceptional situation of the building at the harbor entrance.

== Later years ==
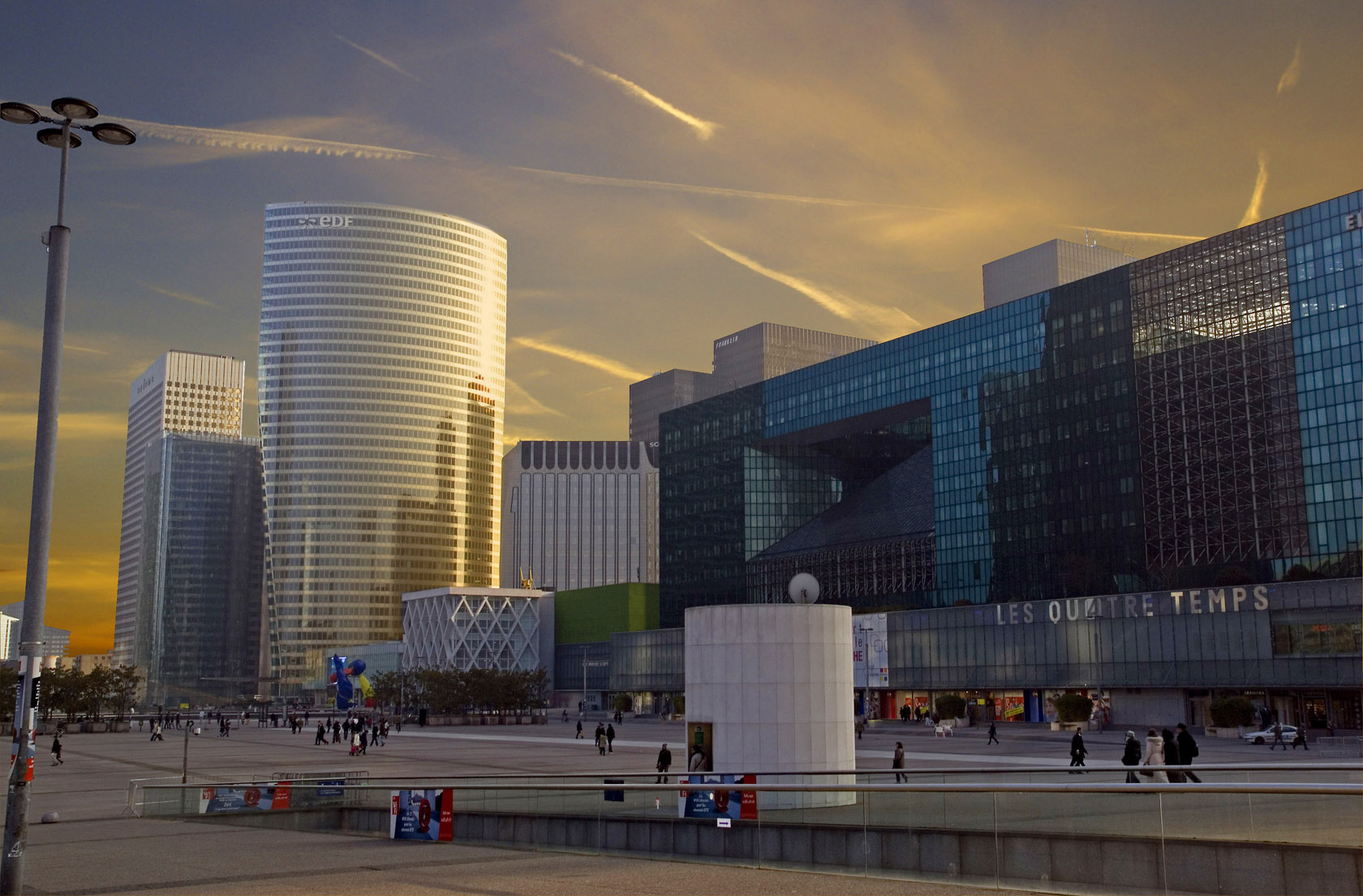
La Défense, Paris: the 1981 Quatre Temps shopping centre on a winter's afternoon

Lagneau was asked by Jean Millier to review the urban plans for Abidjan, Ivory Coast in 1960. Lagneau acted as an advisor to the Institute of Urban Planning and Development of the Paris Region, helping prepare master plans for creation of new towns between 1962 and 1965. In designing the seat of the new department of Essonne, he was influenced by what he had seen in the planned city of Brasília. Thus he proposed a large body of water with the prefect's office in the center, flanked on each side by the courthouse and departmental Assembly. Inspired by the Japanese architect Kenzo Tange, who designed a city built on blocks to allow free movement on the ground and easy installation of equipment, Lagneau decided to place the administrative buildings on pillars. However, these plans were modified due to their cost. The buildings were arranged according to his plan, but were placed on the ground. Lagneau was unhappy but was forced to accept the decision.

Lagneau, was architect of the Prefecture and the Palace of Justice of Évry, Essonne with Michel Weill and Jean Dimitrijevic in 1975. In the late 1970s he designed the 120,000 square metres (1,300,000 sq ft) Quatre-Temps shopping center in La Défense, a business district of Paris, which opened in 1981. It was the biggest commercial centre in Europe at the time, and transformed the district. The Quatre-Temps reflects the values of lightness, sophistication and flexibility.
