= Río de Oro Peninsula =

Peninsula on the Western Sahara coast

Coordinates: 23°42′00″N 15°57′00″W

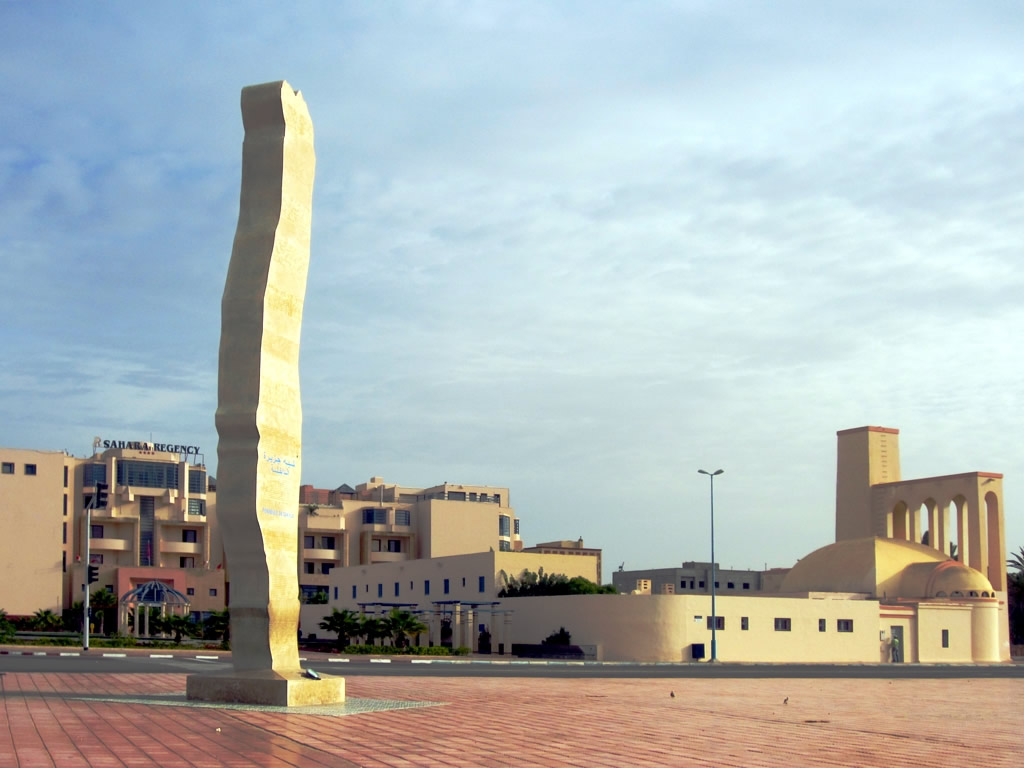

The Río de Oro or Wad ad-Dahab Peninsula (Spanish: Península de Río de Oro or Península de Villa Cisneros) is a peninsula on the Atlantic coast of Western Sahara. The city of Dakhla (Villa Cisneros) lies on the peninsula.

It has a northeast-southwest orientation and a length of about 40 km, linked to the mainland at its northeastern end. Its width is relatively uniform, generally between four and seven kilometers. The narrow Dakhla Bay separates the mainland to the west. Its maximum height does not exceed twenty meters above sea level, but the coast that faces the Atlantic Ocean is higher than that which borders the bay.

The peninsula begins in a small outcrop of the Atlantic coast called Roque Cabrón. Another promontory, Archipres Grande, lies 26 km further on. At the southern end of the peninsula, there are two capes: on the Atlantic coast is Punta Durnford, which is low, features cliffs, and is dominated by sand-dunes; On the side that faces the bay is Punta de la Sarga, which is low and sandy. Between the two is Punta Galera, which has a lighthouse. In the southern third of the peninsula, on the coast of the bay, is the city of Dakhla, which has an anchorage and port facilities.
