= Gonçalo de Sintra =

Portuguese explorer

- Born: Unknown date Kingdom of Portugal
- Died: 1444 or 1445; Nair
- Occupations: Explorer, slave raider

Gonçalo de Sintra or de Cintra (d.1444/45), was a 15th-century Portuguese explorer and servant of Prince Henry the Navigator.

According to chronicler Zurara, Gonçalo de Sintra was a young squire (escudeiro) or stirrup boy in the household of Portuguese prince Henry the Navigator, Duke of Viseu. Others have characterized Sintra as older, an illustrious knight (cavaleiro), distinguished for his military service at Ceuta (although it is possible these were two different men with the same name).

== African Expedition ==
In late 1444 (or 1445), Henry dispatched Gonçalo de Sintra in command of a caravel on an exploratory expedition down the West African coast, with strict instructions to sail straight to the 'land of Guinea', and to not detract from that objective.

Earlier that year, a Portuguese slave-raiding expedition under Lançarote de Freitas had raided the Bay of Arguin (Mauritania), an area clustered with Sanhaja Berber fishing settlements, and taken a few hundred Berber captives, which were sold as slaves in Lagos, Portugal at great profit. Desirous to make some quick profit of his own, Gonçalo de Sintra disobeyed Henry's instructions and decided to make a quick slave-raiding detour to the Arguin banks. But Lançarote's raid had driven much of the local population to evacuate the islands and coasts, with the result that Sintra found the fishing settlements deserted. Sintra managed to capture two Berber women who had lingered on Arguin island, but a Berber slave-boy Sintra had brought from Portugal to serve as translator escaped. This turn of events probably persuaded Sintra to make an effortful search for captives to 'make up' for the loss of the slave-boy rather than just call it quits and go on to Guinea.

According to Zurara, Gonçalo de Sintra directed his caravel to Nair island (ilha do Nar), at the southern end of Arguin bay. At first Nair seemed abandoned, like all the other settlements. But taking a handful of crew aboard a launch, Sintra led a landing party to investigate. Not long after they landed, the Portuguese were ambushed by a hidden force of some seventy armed Sanhaja Berber tribesmen. The conditions of the surf and tide prevented the caravel from approaching the island and rescuing the landing party. Gonçalo de Sintra and seven crewmen were killed on the spot. The caravel, with its remaining crew, immediately returned to Portugal.

Although Zurara identified the location of Sintra's death at Nair island, in the Arguin banks, later chronicler João de Barros asserted the event transpired much further north, just below Rio de Oro, at a location since known as Cintra Bay (Angra de Cintra, Western Sahara).22°58′N 16°10′W. Modern historians have tended to side with Zurara's identification of Nair, suggesting that Cintra Bay was probably named in error by contemporary Portuguese cartographers.

Gonçalo de Sintra was the first of Henry the Navigator's captains to be killed on an expedition, and is generally regarded as the first known Portuguese casualty of the era of Portuguese discoveries.

Although some historians allege Gonçalo de Sintra was a relative (possibly the father) of later Portuguese explorer Pedro de Sintra (who explored the lands of Guinea in 1460), there is no evidence of this (or possibly Pedro is son of a namesake knight?)

== Sources ==
- João de Barros (1552–59) Décadas da Ásia: Dos feitos, que os Portuguezes fizeram no descubrimento, e conquista, dos mares, e terras do Oriente. Vol. 1 (Dec I, Lib.1-5)
- Gomes Eanes de Zurara (1453) Crónica dos feitos notáveis que se passaram na Conquista da Guiné por mandado do Infante D. Henrique or Chronica do descobrimento e conquista da Guiné. [Trans. 1896-99 by C.R. Beazley and E. Prestage, The Chronicle of the Discovery and Conquest of Guinea, London: Halykut]
- Cortesão, Armando (1931) "Subsídios para a história do Descobrimento de Cabo Verde e Guiné", Boletim da Agencia Geral das Colonias, No. 75. As reprinted in 1975, Esparsos, vol. 1, Coimbra
- Diffie, Bailey W., and George D. Winius (1977) Foundations of the Portuguese empire, 1415-1580 Minneapolis, MN: University of Minnesota Press
- Quintella, Ignacio da Costa (1839–40) Annaes da Marinha Portugueza, 2 vols, Lisbon: Academia Real das Sciencias. vol. 1
