= Port Durnford =

Port Durnford (sometimes Port Dunford) may refer to:

- Port Durnford, a town in uMhlathuze Local Municipality, KwaZulu-Natal, South Africa

== See also ==
- Punta Durnford
