= Lançarote de Freitas =

Portuguese explorer and slave trader

Lançarote de Freitas, better known as Lançarote de Lagos or Lançarote da Ilha, was a 15th-century Portuguese explorer and slave raider from Lagos, Portugal. He was the leader of two large Portuguese slaving raids on the West African coast in 1444–1446.

== Background ==
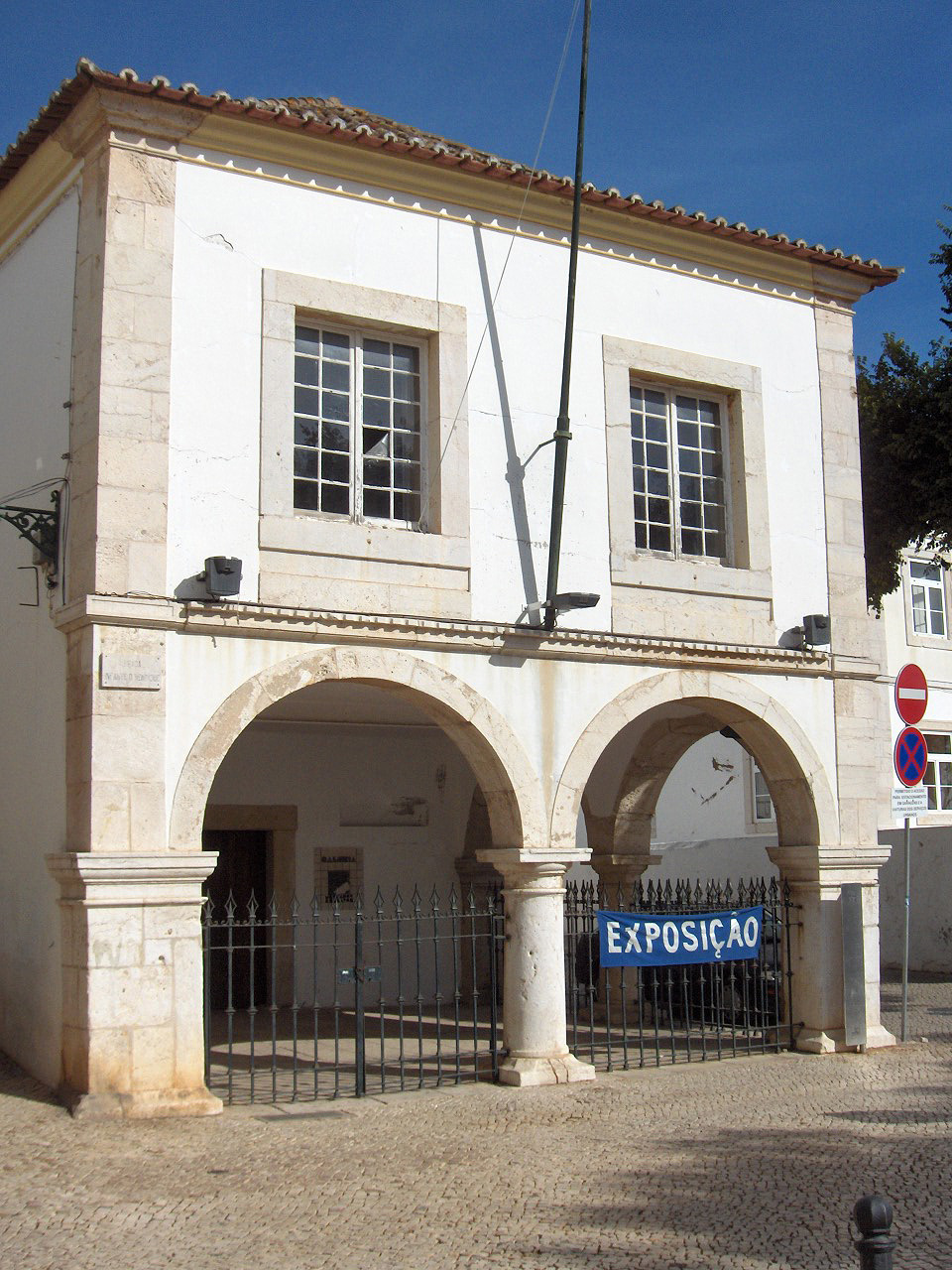
Old Customs house of Lagos, Portugal, site of the first African slave market in Portugal

Lançarote de Freitas, better known as Lançarote da Ilha or simply Lançarote de Lagos, was trained as a squire and chamberlain in the household of the Portuguese prince Henry the Navigator. Lançarote was appointed as almoxarife (customs-collector) of Lagos, Portugal in April 1443, succeeding his father-in-law Soeiro da Costa, who resigned the position in his favor.

Prince Henry the Navigator had been sending maritime expeditions down the West African coast since at least the early 1430s (see Portuguese discoveries). But they had yielded very little profit. The expeditions had sailed mostly along the stark Sahara desert coast, with no human settlements in sight nor encounters worth reporting. But in 1443, one of Henry's captains, Nuno Tristão, returned from an expedition with some 14 captive African natives, Sanhaja Berbers seized from small native fishing village he found in the Bay of Arguin (in modern Mauritania). The elevated banks of Arguin bay were replete with fish, attracting poor desert-dwelling Sanhaja Berbers to set up numerous little fishing settlements on islands and promontories all around the bay. It was the first human habitations that Henry's captains had come across after a decade of exploring, and they seemed weak and vulnerable. The prospect of easy and profitable slave-raiding grounds around the Arguin banks aroused the interest of many Portuguese merchants and fortune-seeking adventurers.

To immediately secure his title, in October 1443, Henry the Navigator received from his brother, the regent prince Peter of Coimbra, letters patent granting him an exclusive monopoly over all navigation south of Cape Bojador, whether for the purpose of war or trade. Any ship sailing south of it without Henry's license could be confiscated. Peter's letters also granted Henry the royal fifth and customs duties (tenth on imports) normally due to the Portuguese crown, on any African goods or slaves brought back to metropolitan Portugal.

A consortium of merchants of Lagos, sometimes referred to as the Companhia de Lagos ('Lagos Company', although it was probably little more than a temporary association of merchants, rather than an incorporated company in the proper sense), applied to Henry for a license. Probably on account of his intimate relationship with Henry, the Lagos merchants elected Lançarote as their head.

== First slave raid (1444) ==
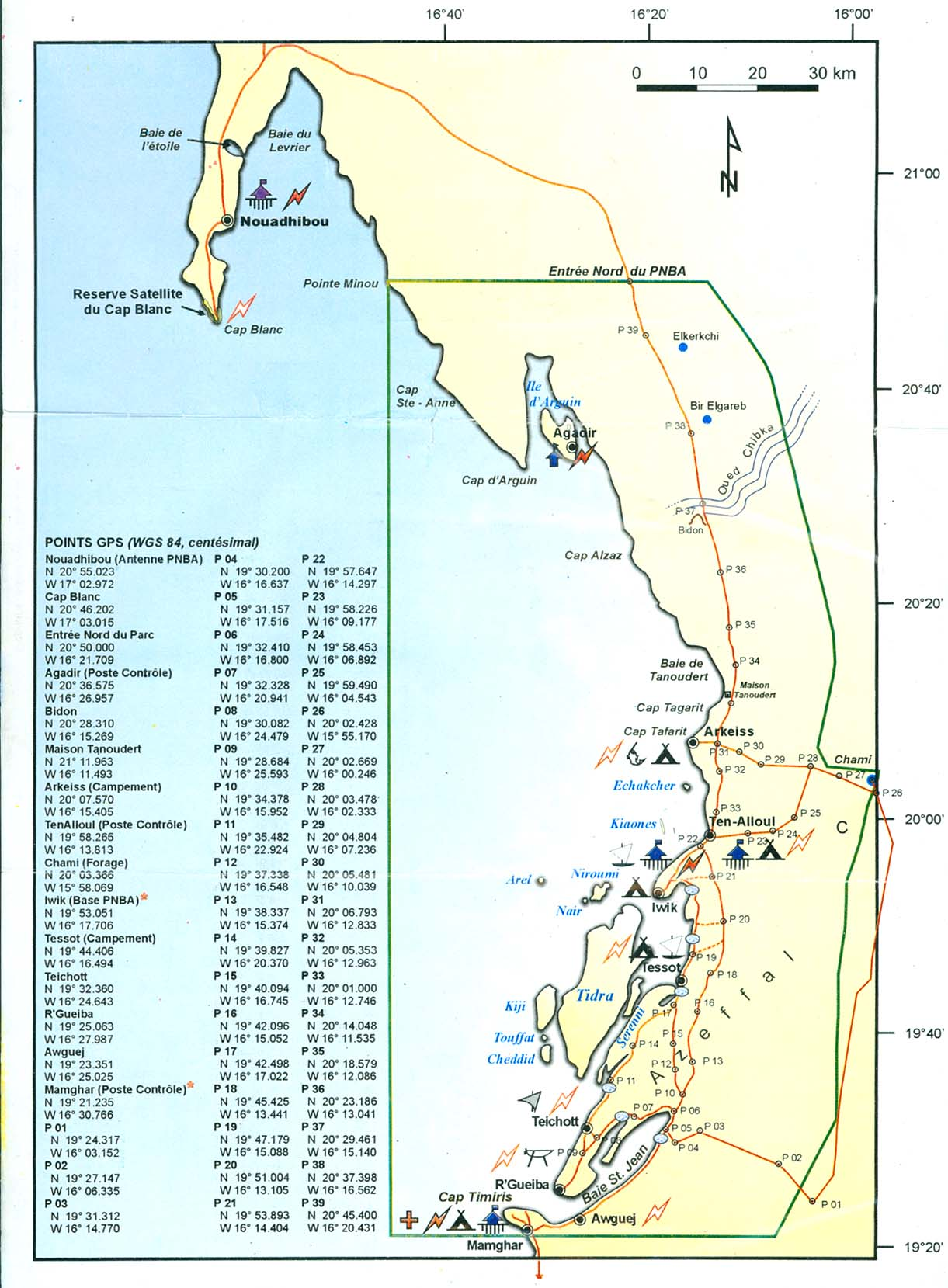
Map of the Bay of Arguin

Having acquired their license, the Lagos company equipped a fleet of six slave ships and about thirty men that set out for the Arguin banks in the spring of 1444. The six captains are usually recorded as:

- 1. Lançarote de Freitas
- 2. Gil Eanes
- 3. Estêvão Afonso
- 4. Rodrigo Álvares
- 5. João Dias
- 6. Uncertain (variously given as Martim Vicente, Gil Vasques, João Bernaldez or even Gonçalo de Sintra).

In his own later memoir, Diogo Gomes identifies himself as having participating in this expedition.

Lançarote's fleet headed straight to the southern end of the Arguin Bay, where they had been told by Nuno Tristão's captives that populous fishing settlements could be found. They arrived in Arguin in June, 1444. A pre-dawn raid on Nar (Nair island) yielded the first set of victims. This was followed up by raids on the larger neighboring island of Tider (Tidra island) and Cerina (Serenni peninsula). In just a few days, the Lagos fleet had kidnapped some 235 hapless Berber people. The remaining population having fled the coastal settlements and hidden in the hinterlands, there was little point remaining in the area. By early August, 1444, the fleet had arrived back in Lagos with their human cargo.

The spectacle of the disembarkation, partition and sale of the Arguin slaves in Lagos, in the presence of Prince Henry, mounted on his horse, is described in heart-breaking detail in Zurara's Crónica. For this lucrative enterprise, Lançarote was knighted by Henry on the spot (August 8, 1444) (even though, according to Zurara, Henry gave away his own allotment - some 46 enslaved people, to which he was entitled as licenser of the expedition - among his captains and household servants).

Alvise Cadamosto, interviewing Arguin slaves in 1455 who recollected the first raids of 1440s, relates the initial impressions of the victims. The Sanhaja fishing folk of Arguin bay had never seen ships or boats before, and thought the Portuguese sails were great seabirds, or perhaps great fish. As Portuguese slave raids were usually undertaken under cover of darkness, the locals believed them to be ghosts who roamed at night and were very frightened of them. The initial belief that they were non-human spirits was reinforced when raids were conducted at very distant parts of the coast overnight, which usually took a normal person three days to travel on foot.

== Second slave raid (1445/1446) ==
Lançarote organized a second Lagos fleet for another large slave raid in 1445 (or 1446). The Lagos fleet was composed of 14 ships, the captains normally given as:

- 1. Lançarote de Freitas
- 2. Soeiro da Costa (alcaide of Lagos and Lançarote's father-in-law)
- 3. Álvaro de Freitas (probably a relative of Lançarote)
- 4. Gomes Pires (captain of the king's caravel)
- 5. Rodrigo Eanes Travassos (of the household of the regent Peter of Coimbra),
- 6. a knight known as Palançano (aboard a fusta)
- 7. Vicente Dias of Lagos
- 8. Martim Vicente
- 9. a captain nicknamed Picanço (speculated to be Diogo Gomes)
- 10. Lourenço Dias

and, more speculatively:

- 11. Diogo Gonçalves,
- 12. Pedro Alemão,
- 13. Gil Gonçalves,
- 14. Leonel Gil (son of Gil Eanes).

This fleet is said to have carried Gil Eanes and Estêvão Afonso as passengers.

Setting out in August, 1445 (or 1446), Lançarote's Lagos fleet was just one of several fleets that set out from Portugal for the Arguin banks that year. Caught by bad weather, Lançarote arrived at Cape Blanc with only nine ships still together, the remaining having strayed off. He proceeded to the northern end of the Arguin banks, anchoring in at ilha das Graças (uncertain, possibly Madeleine island or Pelicans island). There, Lançarote was met by one of his missing ships, Vicente Dias, that had gone on ahead to Arguin island and stumbled across a small fleet of three Lisbon ships, headed by Dinis Eanes de Grã, who had preceded them and devastated the remaining settlements on the northern end of the bay, kidnapping some 100 people. At Grã's suggestion, Lançarote's fleet, now thirteen strong (only Palançano's fusta remained unaccounted for) attacked Arguin island again, taking four captives. They then headed to the southern end of Arguin Bay, kidnapping 57 Tider people and an additional five people somewhere further down (possibly around Cape Timris). The element of surprise being gone and the bulk of the population having already evacuated the coast, Lançarote's captives were principally Sanhaja Berber tribesmen who had decided to stay and put up a fight.

Dissatisfied with the "meager" number of human beings they had taken, and realizing that Arguin Bay was too thoroughly deserted to yield up any more, Lançarote decided to take his fleet south to raid the Wolof lands of Senegal, which had been discovered (but not yet raided) by Nuno Tristão and Dinis Dias the previous year. However, not all his ships were up for the journey, several of them running short on supplies. As a result, Lançarote partitioned his fleet, taking only six or seven caravels with him, sending the remaining ships back to Lagos under the command of Soeiro da Costa (a few of which would conduct an unauthorized slave raid on the Canary Islands of La Palma and Gomera on their way home).

Lançarote's squadron soon arrived at Barbary Point, the mouth of the Senegal River, which had not yet been explored by Europeans. Lançarote dispatched Estêvão Afonso and Vicente Dias on a launch to search upriver for settlements. The exploration didn't get very far. Venturing ashore at one point along the river bank, Afonso abducted two Wolof children from a local woodsman's hut, only to be chased down and furiously beaten by their father. Having barely escaped with their lives, the launch immediately returned (with the two kidnapped children) to the waiting caravels.

After sending back yet another caravel to Lagos, Lançarote proceeded with his five remaining ships to sail around Cape Vert and enter Dakar Bay. While rounding the Cape, the squadron made a brief stop on an island (probably Madeleine islands), where they found a bunch of wild goats and some fresh water. They then proceed into the bay and landed on a second island - Gorée island (marked on Portuguese maps as Bezeguiche). The island was uninhabited, and they marveled at the large wide trees there (probably baobab trees). But they also found signs of prior human presence - some goat skins and a carved marker with Henry the Navigator's motto (Talent de bien faire). These had been left behind on the Gorée island by Álvaro Fernandes, a Portuguese explorer from Madeira who had preceded them there only a few weeks earlier. During his stay, Alvaro Fernandes had attempted to seize a couple of native canoes in Dakar Bay, with the result that the Wolof (or more probably Lebou) tribesmen of the mainland were already alert and in arms against the arriving ships of Lançarote's fleet. With the Wolof warriors mustered on the beach, the Portuguese did not dare land for another day and night. Finally, to break the impasse, Lançarote sent out Gomes Pires on a launch to the mainland, hoping to open negotiations with the local chieftains. Pires managed to lay out some gift goods (mirror, cake, paper, etc.) on the beach and withdraw. But rather than curiosity or delight, the Wolof warriors came out and angrily destroyed the gift goods with their spears. Gomes Pires ordered the Portuguese on the launch to ready their crossbows. They approached the beach again, but they were greeted with a hail of thrown assegais and poisoned arrows and forced to retreat.

Their first strategy foiled, Lançarote and the Portuguese captains held a conference on Gorée. According to Barros, the captains agreed to launch a raid on the mainland Wolof villages 'in the style' of Arguin. But this came to naught. Before being able to organize the attack, a sudden storm enveloped the area (a Cape Verde hurricane?), and forced the Portuguese caravels out of Dakar bay, scattering them in various directions. (Zurara makes no report of the planned attack or storm; he says merely the Portuguese captains decided they ought to depart and sail back north and try their luck at the Senegal River again).

Bad weather overtook them upon leaving Dakar bay and split the fleet. Lançarote managed to hold two caravels (Álvaro de Freitas and Vicente Dias) together with his own, but lost sight of the remaining two ships. Perhaps realizing they were now too few to launch an attack on the Wolof mainland, Lançarote's trio skipped past the Senegal River, and set sail back to the Arguin banks. The trio anchored in again at Tider and took an additional 59 captives, before returning to Lagos. The remaining two ships (Gomes Pires and Lourenço Dias) had to make their way back to Portugal by themselves. On his way, Gomes Pires made a brief stop in Cape Blanc, and bought some seal pelts and a Black slave from some Berber traders. Before proceeding back to Portugal, Pires promised to return to the same spot next year, and the Berber traders promised to bring him enough slaves, gold and other goods to fill his ship. Only Lourenço Dias actually made it inside the Senegal River, but realizing he was alone, decided to turn around and sailed back home by himself.

== Aftermath ==
In number of captives, the second 1445/6 slaving expedition had been somewhat of a "disappointment" (at least relative to the first 1444 attack). The prospect for future slave raids seemed dim. The Arguin banks were devastated and it was unlikely the Berber populations would return to the coasts in significant numbers, or allow themselves to be taken by surprise. The Wolof-dominated coasts of Senegal were too strong and alert for small groups of venturing Portuguese slave-raiders. If slave raids were to have any prospect of kidnapping people, the element of surprise was necessary, which now meant sailing well below Senegal to new "hunting grounds" - lengthier expeditions which required probably more supplies and capital than what Lagos merchants were willing to front or captains willing to sail. The killing of Nuno Tristão and his crew the next year (1446 or 1447) probably dampened any remaining enthusiasm among Lagos merchants for renewing the slave raids.

Portuguese slave-raiding expeditions seem to have been suspended after 1447 (Zurara's chronicle ends here). Given the growing expenses and casualties, it seems the Portuguese switched from slave-raiding to slave-trading after this. Prince Henry ordered the erection of a permanent factory on Arguin island by 1450, to tap into the Trans-Saharan trade traffic in slaves and gold coming up overland from Guinea. The slave-trader and explorer Alvise Cadamosto, who travelled to West Africa in 1455 with Henry's license, provides some details of trade at Arguin. He noted that to keep the peace around Arguin, Prince Henry had instituted a prohibition on any further kidnapping of Berber Sanhaja people, and only allowed the acquisition of pagan Black African slaves by trade.

In his memoir, Cadamosto claims that the Portuguese had also negotiated the establishment of trading posts with the Wolof kingdoms of Waalo and Kayor along the Grande Côte of Senegal. It has been suggested that Lourenço Dias, one of the captains of Lançarote's slave raid of 1445/46, returned to the Senegal region (sometime between 1448 and 1455), and negotiated peace and trade agreements with the Wolof statelets. Regular trade subsequently opened in the area, the Portuguese exchanging Mediterranean goods (notably, horses) for slaves and gold. This can be said to be the beginning of the Atlantic slave trade.

The new trading stations at Arguin and Senegal were estimated by Cadamosto have to have bought 700-800 African slaves annually to metropolitan Portugal by the mid-1450s. But there would be no resumption of the slave razzias of 1444–47. There is no record of any Portuguese ship sailing below Cape Vert again for nearly a decade (until Cadamosto in 1455).

== Later life ==
Little more is heard about Lançarote de Lagos after his second raiding expedition of 1445/46. He continued as customs-collector (almoxarife) in Lagos. Having been knighted after his first expedition, Lançarote was promoted by the regent Peter as "caudel" of Lagos in May, 1446. There are documents suggesting Lançarote was organizing and sending provisions supply ships from Lagos to Ceuta between 1452 and 1455. Records show Lançarote was still alive in May, 1463, after which there is no further trace.

== Sources ==
=== Chronicles ===
- Alvise Cadamosto (wr. 1460s, pub. 1507) "Il Libro di Messer Alvise Ca da Mosto Gentilhuomo Venetiano", as printed in Venice (1550), by Giovanni Battista Ramusio, ed., Primo volume delle navigationi et viaggi nel qua si contine la descrittione dell'Africa. online (English translation: "Original Journals of the Voyages of Cada Mosto and Piedro de Cintra to the Coast of Africa, the former in the years 1455 and 1456, and the latter soon afterwards", in R. Kerr, 1811, A General History of Voyages and Travels to the end of the 18th century, vol. 2, Edinburgh: Blackwood. online)
- Diogo Gomes (c.1499) De prima inventione Guineae [trans. by Gabriel Pereira (1898–99) as "As Relações do Descobrimento da Guiné e das ilhas dos Açores, Madeira e Cabo Verde" in Boletim da Sociedade de Geografia de Lisboa, no. 5.
- João de Barros (1552–59) Décadas da Ásia: Dos feitos, que os Portuguezes fizeram no descubrimento, e conquista, dos mares, e terras do Oriente. Vol. 1 (Dec I, Lib.1-5)
- Gomes Eanes de Zurara (1453) Crónica dos feitos notáveis que se passaram na Conquista da Guiné por mandado do Infante D. Henrique or Chronica do descobrimento e conquista da Guiné. [Trans. 1896–99 by C.R. Beazley and E. Prestage, The Chronicle of the Discovery and Conquest of Guinea, London: Halykut]
- Manuel de Faria e Sousa (1675) "Empieça la Memoria de todas las Armadas", in Asia Portuguesa, Vol. 3, p.525-61

=== Secondary ===
- Cortesão, Armando (1931) "Subsídios para a história do Descobrimento de Cabo Verde e Guiné", Boletim da Agencia Geral das Colonias, No. 75. As reprinted in 1975, Esparsos, vol. 1, Coimbra
- Diffie, Bailey W., and George D. Winius (1977) Foundations of the Portuguese empire, 1415-1580 Minneapolis, MN: University of Minnesota Press
- Magalhães Godinho, Vitorino (1983) Os descobrimentos e a economia mundial, 2nd ed., v.4.
- Quintella, Ignaco da Costa (1839–40) Annaes da Marinha Portugueza, 2 vols, Lisbon: Academia Real das Sciencias. vol. 1
- Oliveira, Aurelio de (2002) ""Diogo Gomes: trato e diplomacia ao serviço da Expansão", Revista da Faculdade de Letras, Porto, p. 163.
- Rau, Virginia, and Diffie, B. W. (1953) "Alleged Fifteenth - Century Portuguese Joint - Stock Companies and the Articles of Dr. Fitzler", Bulletin of the Institute of Historical Research, v.26, p. 181
- Russell, Peter E. (2000) Prince Henry 'the Navigator': a life. New Haven, Conn: Yale University Press.
- Teixera da Mota, Avelino (1946) "A descoberta da Guiné", Boletim cultural da Guiné Portuguesa, Vol. 1. No. 1 (Jan), p. 11-68, No. 2 (Apr), p. 273-326; No. 3 (Jul), p. 457-509.
