= Cintra Bay =

Bay in Western Sahara

- Gulf of Cintra; Golfo de Cintra
- Bahía de Cintra (Spanish); Angra de Cintra (Spanish)
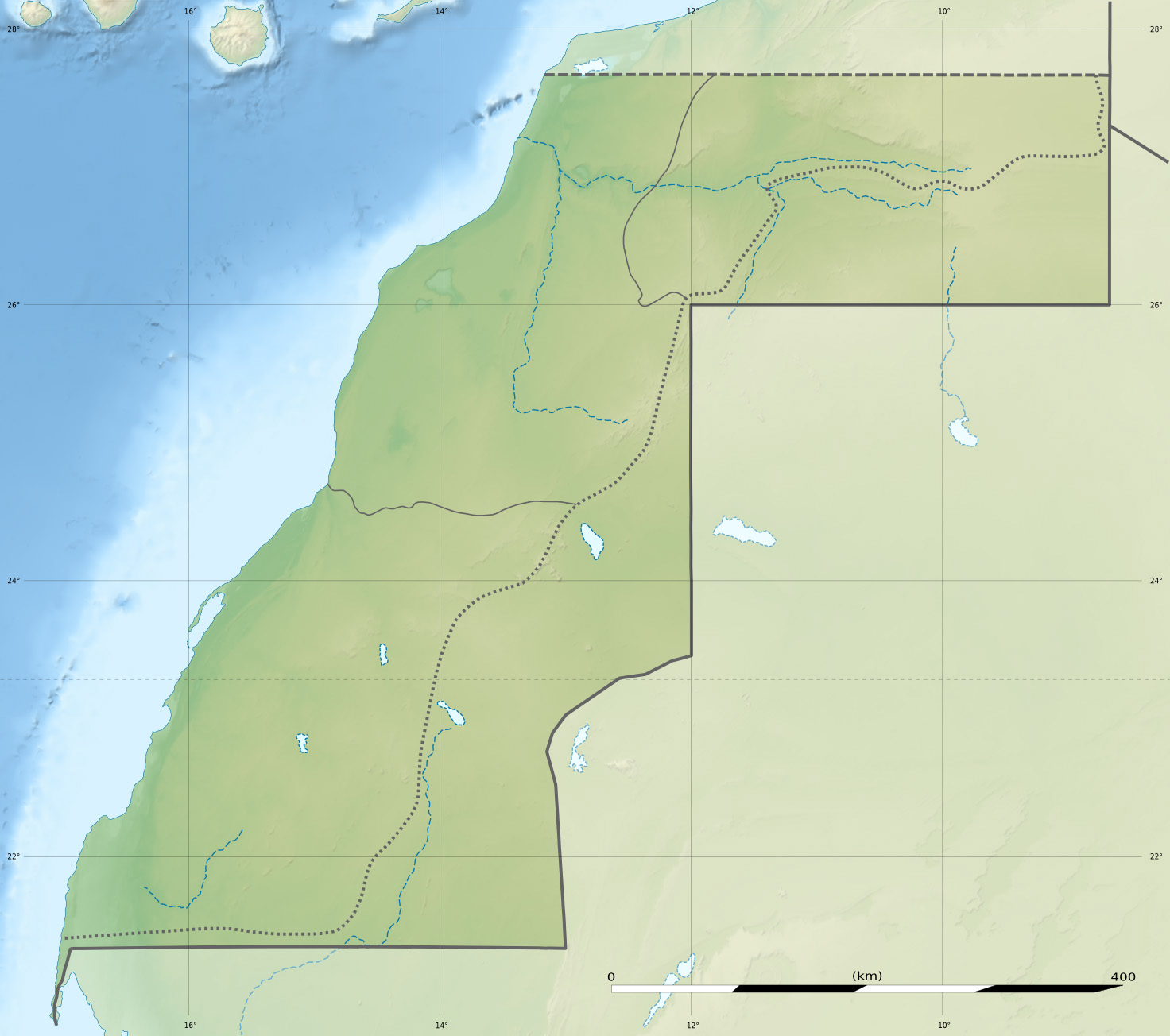
- Location off of Western Sahara
- Location: Western Sahara
- Coordinates: 22.951944°N 16.215556°W
- Type: Bay
- Part of: Atlantic Ocean

Cintra Bay or the Gulf of Cintra is a large, half-moon shaped bay on the coast of Río de Oro province, Western Sahara. It is located about 120 km (75 mi) south of Dakhla. Its coastline is sparsely populated, and the environment is mostly wild and undeveloped. Originally called "St. Cyprian's Bay", it was renamed after Captain Gonçalo de Sintra, a 15th-century Portuguese explorer who was thought to have met his death in the bay (Note: The actual raid, in which the Captain and 7 of his men met their fates, occurred in the Bay of Arguin, further south) during an unauthorized, unsuccessful slave raid.

== Etymology ==
The area was originally called "St. Cyprian's Bay" but was renamed after Gonçalo de Sintra.

The Treaty of Angra de Cintra of 1958, which led to the end of the War of Ifni, was named after Cintra Bay.

== Geography ==
Cintra Bay

Climate chart (precipitation, max. and min. temperature)
J	F	M	A	M	J	J	A	S	O	N	D
5 21 5	2 23 10	2 29 13	4 31 14	1 33 15	1 28 14	1 30 17	9 34 19	12 33 19	1 33 19	4 27 15	8 26 11
- █ Average max. and min. temperatures in °C
- █ Precipitation totals in mm
Imperial conversion
J	F	M	A	M	J	J	A	S	O	N	D
0.2 70 41	0.1 73 50	0.1 84 55	0.2 88 57	0 91 59	0 82 57	0 86 63	0.4 93 66	0.5 91 66	0 91 66	0.2 81 59	0.3 79 52
- █ Average max. and min. temperatures in °F
- █ Precipitation totals in inches

The bay occupies 29 nautical miles between Punta del Pescador and Lagouira bay, and in general is open and very shallow, the average depth of the central part being 10 meters. It is about 24 km (15 mi) in diameter, from the northern cape of Puntilla de las Raimas, near Via Candelaria and Hassi Amatai, south to Puntila Negra or Punta Negra, near Las Talaitas. The deepest point of the bay is at Hasi el Beied, near the middle of Cintra Bay. Gulf waters consist of the inner Angra de Citra and outer areas of Bajo El Tortugo, Bajo Ahogado, and Bajo del Medio Golfo. The pelagic water out of Cintra Bay is called Bajo Arcila. Cliffs, dunes, beaches, and lagoons make up most of the coastal landscape. A large lagoon, Bajo Tortugo ("Bay of the Little Tortoise"), is on the northern side, and there is an area named Las Matorrales in the southern part. Several hills, some of which have flattened top or peaks can be seen along the region.

Cintra Bay has a peninsula at each end. Punta de las Raimas in the north is 2 mi (3.2 km) in length and mostly sandy and has rocks and a reef at the tip, while a sand dune can be found on the Punta Negra, which has reefs extending about 2 mi (3.2 km) around it.

The shoal off to the southwest of Cintra Bay is called Banco de Sylvia. It lies between Dakhla and Cintra Bay, while Amseisat Saccum and Imlili are further east within the inner desert.

Across the opposite side of Las Taraitas and Morro de Gorrei lies the Bay of Gorrei or the'Bahia de Gorrei, similar in shape but smaller than Cintra Bay. There are several other bays or inlets in shapes almost identical to Cintra or Gorrei Bays along the Rio de Oro region.

=== Bathymetry ===
The geographical and bathymetric factors of Cintra Bay make it suitable for fishing and aquaculture. Its shallowness and closed-in aspect give it the highest water temperatures in the region. The south–north current flows only within the bay and is affected by tides, notably in areas near open water. This current also causes a vortex, or marine circulation in levorotation, at the northern area.

== Natural history ==
The bay's coastline and surrounding areas are part of the western Sahara Desert, being covered mostly by dunes, making Cintra bay's vegetation very poor.

In contrast to the land, the waters in this area are part of the Canary Current System which is a highly productive ocean current, and the Nouadhibou Upwelling. One of major upwelling zones is located just off the continental shelf. This makes the area one of the richest grounds for fishing in the world, and Cintra Bay itself serves as a hotspot for zooplankton and a spawning ground for sardines. Cephalaspidea can also be found within the bay.

Although Morocco once considered to create a national park including Cintra and Dakhla Bays, it has been claimed that both the environment and biodiversity of Cintra Bay are threatened by an ongoing plan to strengthen Morocco's aquaculture with support from the EU, and that research is needed in the area, notably on right whales, and protections for local fishing communities.

=== Mammals ===
==== Cetaceans ====
Based on 19th century whaling records, the coastline from 10 miles north of Puntilla de las Raimas, called "Goree" Bay by whalers, to 20 miles north of Cabo Barbas and possibly a broader range was the only known wintering or calving ground for the eastern North Atlantic population of North Atlantic right whales. These whales are now thought to be either extinct or in the low-tens of animals left at best. In the 18th and 19th centuries, the Cintra Bay Ground was one of three or four major grounds for right whale hunting in the North Atlantic, along with the south-eastern coastal United States, Cape Farewell in Greenland, and probably the Icelandic region, and also being one of two winter-spring fields along with the US coasts.

Approximately 92 whales were killed during 44 visits by whalers from November to April each year, giving this region the highest catch density in the 19th century, though whaling was not carried out during all seasons. 82 of those animals were actually taken in the first two years of 1855–56, probably with some other species such as the humpbacks. A scientific survey extending to Dakhla peninsula/bay was conducted in 1998 and no evidence of any right whales still using the area was found. It was also found that these coastal waters were surprisingly poor in cetacean biodiversity. Only two species were found regularly, both with very small numbers, and both were found only in the Dakhla Bay region: a larger type of bottlenose dolphin and Atlantic humpback dolphins. Killer whales are known to occur along the coasts of Western Sahara today and occasionally in large numbers, according to whaling logs.

Recent studies gave hope that Cinta Bay could possibly be recolonized by right whales from the western population, as the two populations have been revealed to be much closer to each other than was previously thought.

Regardless of habitat densities, baleen whales, fin whales, Brydes's whale, sei whales, and minke whales are known to still occur along the coasts of Western Sahara. Of these, fin whales and Bryde's whales had been confirmed in Dakhla and Cintra - Gorrei areas. Other species such as Risso's dolphins, common dolphins, rough-toothed dolphins, and harbor porpoises that have been confirmed in Bay of Arguin area may possibly occur here as well.

==== Pinnipeds ====
Along with cetaceans, Cintra Bay may provide an important habitat for critically endangered Mediterranean monk seals. They were severely hunted to the brink of extinction in the 15th century by European sealers and local tribes, and are now almost extinct in the Mediterranean Sea. Though not in Cintra Bay, Cabo Blanco on Dakhla Peninsula still hosts the largest of the remaining colonies.

==== Terrestrial species ====
A large fraction of the biodiversity of terrestrial animals along the bay is unclear and has not been studied. Friendly camels (dromedary) live around the coast.

=== Sea reptiles ===
Sea turtles are known to nest on the beach along the bay. There have been studies focusing on Dakhla region.

=== Birds ===
Many species of migratory birds and oceanic birds, such as Western Palearctic waders, winter on West Sahara's coastline, in the Cintra Bay region and the Banc d'Arguin National Park, a UNESCO World Heritage Site, Mauritania where nearly 110 species of seabirds are confirmed. Based on bio-tracking studies, osprey is also a species to migrate here.

== Settlements ==
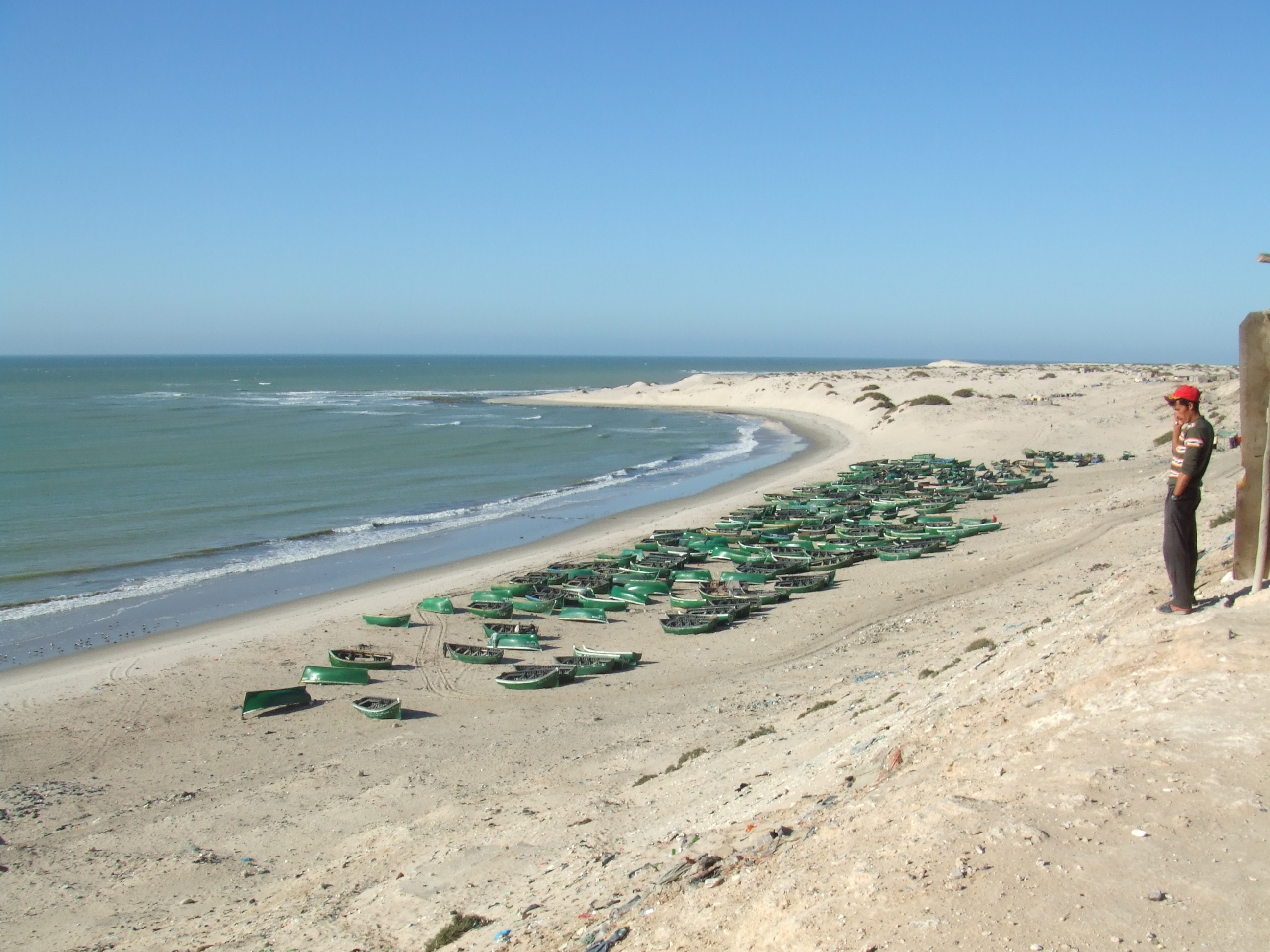
One of the settlements adjacent to Cintra Bay

The area is very remote and almost unpopulated, with only several small fishing settlements of shacks scattered along the coast. Of these, Puntillas de las Raimas which is at Bajo Tortugo, the northern end of the bay, is the largest. However, the population has reduced in recent times and the village was almost abandoned as of 2012. Porto Rico, another fishing settlement in the north of the bay, also lost significant population.

The closest urban city is at Dakhla, approximately 120 km (75 mi) away.

== Tourism ==
Although Cintra Bay has been considered a local attraction, sandstorms (especially in the spring) and mines collected from Cabo Barbas make the area unsuitable for tourists.

== See also ==
- North Atlantic right whale
