= Dinis Dias =

Portuguese explorer (15th-century)

Dinis Dias was a 15th-century Portuguese explorer who sailed down the coast of West Africa, passing the Senegal River and reaching the Cape Verde Peninsula for the first time.

In 1445, as Dias was beginning to enter old age and made the decision to take up exploring because "he was unwilling to let himself grow soft in the well being of repose", left Portugal and sailed down the West African coast, setting a new record by reaching a point about 800 kilometres south of Cap Blanc. This, the most westerly part of the African continent, he named Cap-Vert (Dias named it Cabo Verde, "verde" being Portuguese for "green", a reference to the lush vegetation in the area). Dias did not discover the Cape Verde Islands, but rather the actual cape.

The success of this expedition has been attributed to his lack of interest in taking slaves, a pursuit most Portuguese mariners in Africa focused on.

Later that year, Dias sailed with the explorer Lançarote de Freitas in a large scale slaving expedition to Arguim.

== See also ==
- Portugal in the period of discoveries
- Portuguese Empire
