= Pedro García Cabrera =

Spanish writer (1905–1981)

- Cover illustration of García Cabrera by S. del Pilar, a reproduction from Gaceta de Arte, 1933
- Born: 19 August 1905; Vallehermoso, Canary Islands
- Died: 20 March 1981 (aged 75); Santa Cruz de Tenerife, Canary Islands
- Occupations: Writer, poet, military intelligence, bureaucrat

Pedro García Cabrera (19 August 1905 – 20 March 1981) was a Spanish writer and poet. A member of the Generation of '27, he is considered one of the greatest poets of the Canary Islands.

== Biography ==
=== Early life ===
Born in Vallehermoso, on the island of La Gomera, at the age of seven he moved with his family to Seville, where his father, a teacher, had found work. Three years later, his family moved to the island of Tenerife. García Cabrera received his bachelor's degree from the Instituto General y Técnico de La Laguna, and he wrote and published his first pieces of poetry in periodicals such as La voz de Junonia, Gaceta de Tenerife, Cartones (which he co-founded in 1930), and Hespérides. In 1928 appeared one of his most important works, Líquenes, which deals with the subject of islands and the sea.

He participated, with other local writers, in the creation of the periodical known as Gaceta de Arte (1932–1936), a literary and philosophical magazine dealing with cinema and the fine arts. The magazine enjoyed international readership and connected him and other writers of the Canary Islands with intellectuals from mainland Europe, such as the surrealists.

Transparencias fugadas appeared in 1934. His Obras Completas were published posthumously in 1987. García Cabrera wrote not only lyrical poetry, but also plays and political texts.

In the 1920s, in the days of the Second Spanish Republic, García Cabrera had become active in politics as a member of the Spanish Socialist Workers' Party (PSOE), and in 1931 he ran for office in municipal elections as a representative of the Republican-Socialist coalition that had toppled the Bourbon monarchy of Alfonso XIII. His political activities were both intensive and extensive, and he served as a spokesperson for the PSOE in the municipality of Santa Cruz de Tenerife and the island government of Tenerife. He served as editor of the periodical El Socialista.

=== Imprisonment, escape, and imprisonment once more ===
At the outbreak of the Spanish Civil War he was arrested, together with other Republican politicians, for his socialist leanings on 18 July 1936 and incarcerated on a prison ship. He was sentenced to 30 years imprisonment. On 19 August he was sent, with 36 other people, on the ship Viera y Clavijo to the prison camp at Villa Cisneros, in the Spanish Sahara. In March 1937 he managed to escape and made his way to Dakar. He remained there for seven months. It is unclear how he spent his time there or how he survived, but it is known that he met the Senegalese poet Léopold Sédar Senghor.

From Dakar he made his way to Marseille. He entered Spain by train and joined the Republican front in Andalusia, serving in military intelligence. One night, when he was returning to Jaén from a mission in Andújar, his jeep collided with a train carrying wounded soldiers. Four of his companions died, and García Cabrera suffered severe burns on his legs. He was interned in the civilian hospital in Jaén. He was arrested once more in Granada, a few months before the conclusion of the war. He remained imprisoned until 1946.

=== War works ===
García Cabrera's profoundest and most universal works concern his experiences in prison and in wartime. Entre la guerra y tú, a dense and complex work, was written furtively in jail between the years 1936 and 1939. While in Villa Cisneros, he wrote La arena y la intimidad (1940), which concerns his experiences not only as a prisoner of the Nationalists but also of the desert. The Romancero cautivo (1936–1939) is an umbrella title for the three short collections of ballads that were also written in captivity. These are:

- Con el alma en un hilo (1936–1937)
- En el puño del recuerdo (1940)
- Agenda de un prisionero (1939–1940)

=== Later works ===
Though he was released, he remained under strict vigilance in a state of house arrest (libertad vigilada), and lived in the city of Santa Cruz de Tenerife, occupying a minor bureaucratic post.

Later publications include Día de alondras (1951), La esperanza me mantiene (1959), Entre cuatro paredes (1968), Vuelta à la isla (1968), Hora punta del hombre (1970), Las islas en que vivo (1971), Elegías muertas de hambre (1975), Ojos que no ven (1977) and Hacia la libertad (1978).

From 10 to 14 October 2005, an international academic conference, with the support of the University of La Laguna and the cabildo (island government) of La Gomera, was held in La Gomera to celebrate the centenary of his birth.
