= Dakhla Bay =

Coordinates: 23°44′N 15°51′W

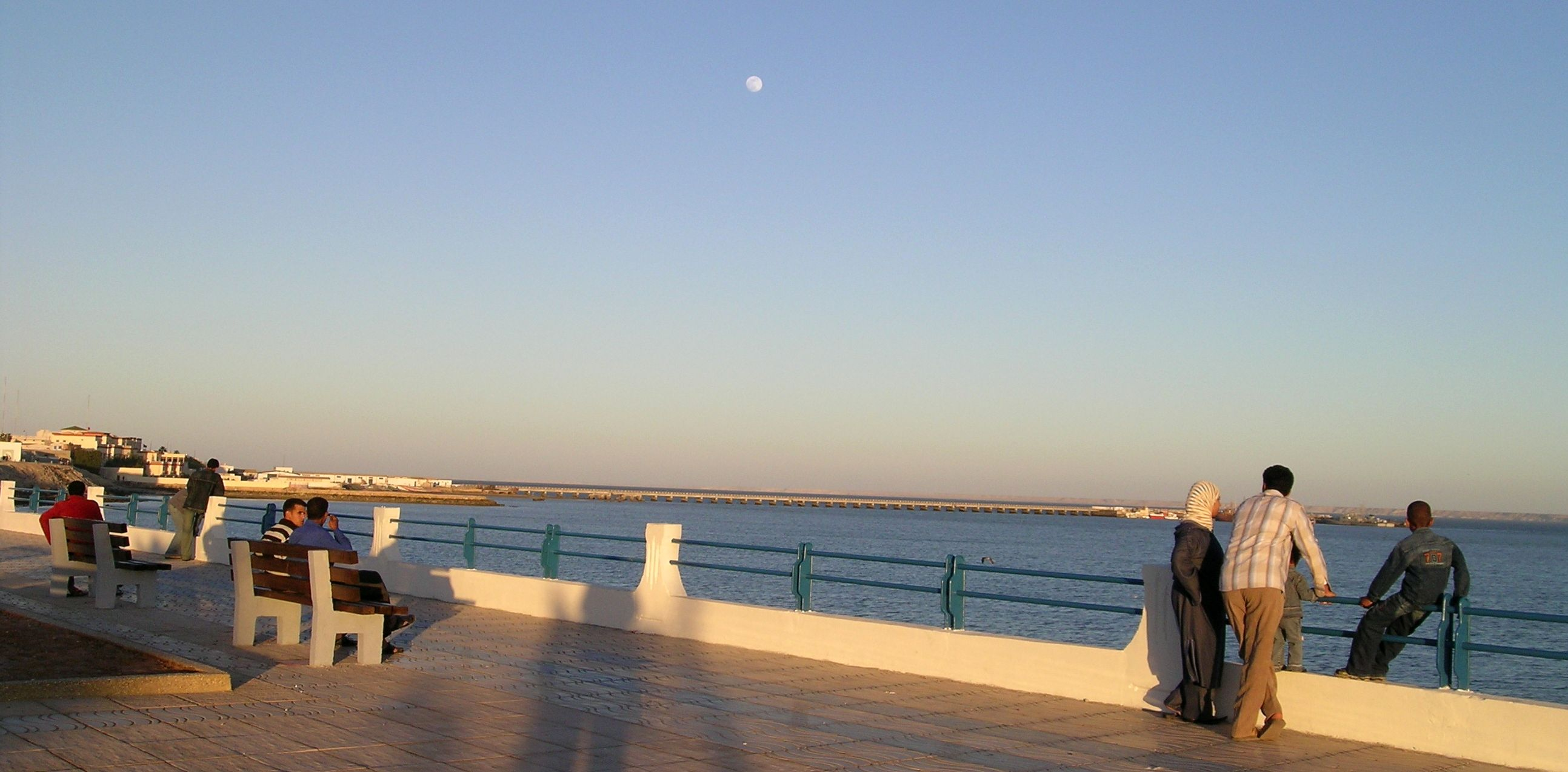
Border of the Río de Oro peninsula, in Dajla (Western Sahara).

Dakhla Bay is a bay in the Atlantic Ocean formed by the peninsula where the city of Dakhla is located, in the part of Western Sahara administered de facto by Morocco.

== Location ==
Within the framework of Moroccan territorial administration, Dakhla Bay is part of the province of Oued Ed Dahab, which is bordered to the south by the province of Aousserd, within the Dakhla-Oued Ed Dahab region.

With an area of almost 400 km2, it extends over 37 km. It is bordered on the continent by national road.

== Protection ==
Dakhla Bay is classified nationally as a Site of Biological and Ecological Importance (SIBE) and also internationally as an Important Bird Conservation Area (ZICO) and, since 2005, as a major wetland (Ramsar Site).

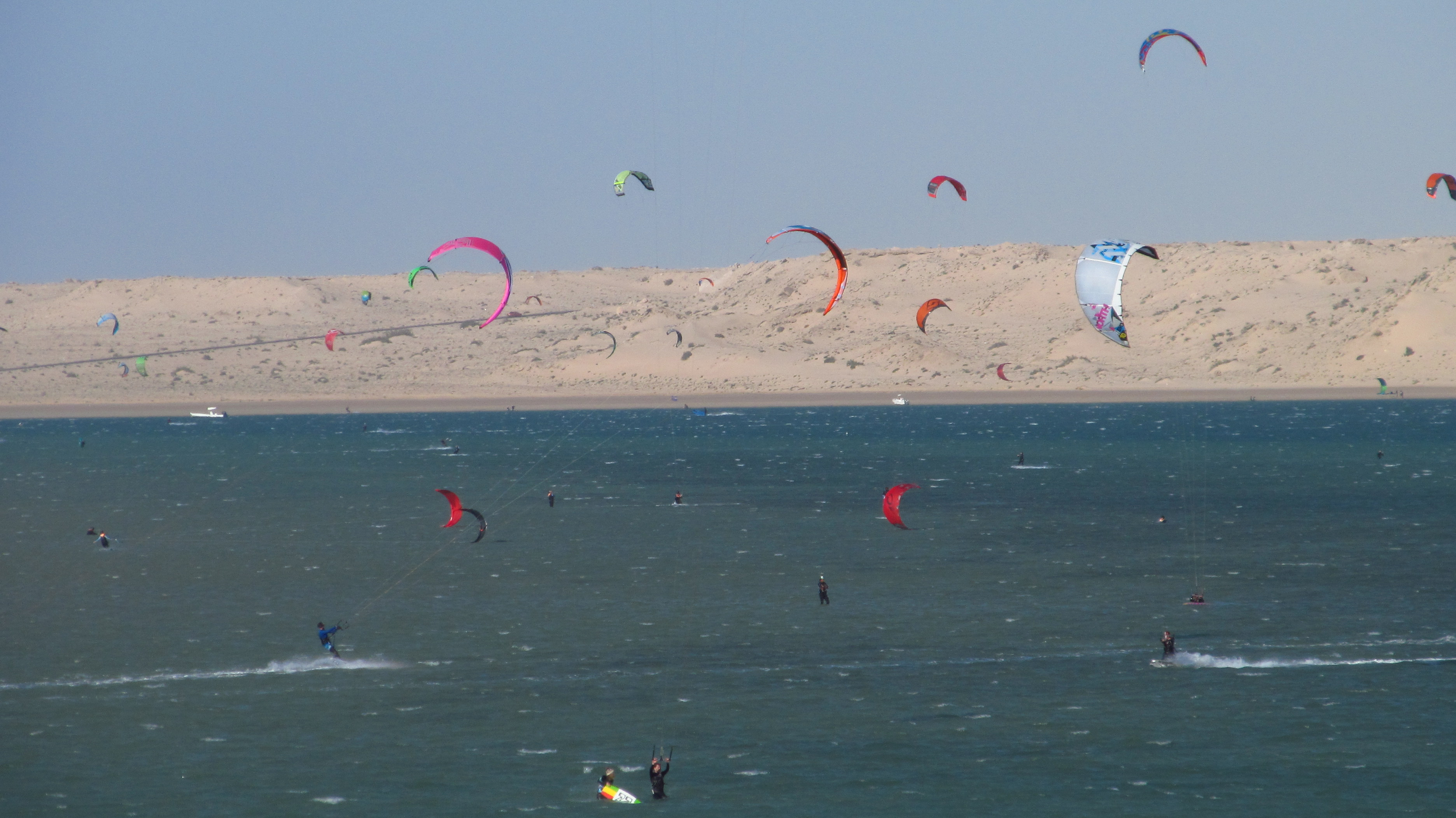
Paragliding in Dakhla

== Maritime infrastructure ==
Two ports, built beyond a jetty, are located in Dakhla Bay. The older one, dating back to the time of the Spanish Sahara, is currently used by the Royal Navy. The more recent port (operational since December 2001) is the Dakhla port itself.
