= Punta Durnford =

Coordinates: 23°38′41″N 16°00′24″W

Punta Durnford is a cape in Western Sahara Morocco .on the Atlantic Ocean, lying 6.7 km southwest of Dakhla. It is the westernmost tip of the Río de Oro Peninsula.

Punta Durnford has been identified as "The Horn of the West" mentioned by the Carthaginian Hanno the Navigator.
