= Dakhla, Western Sahara =

Dakhla الداخلة ⴷⴰⵅⵍⴰ
- City
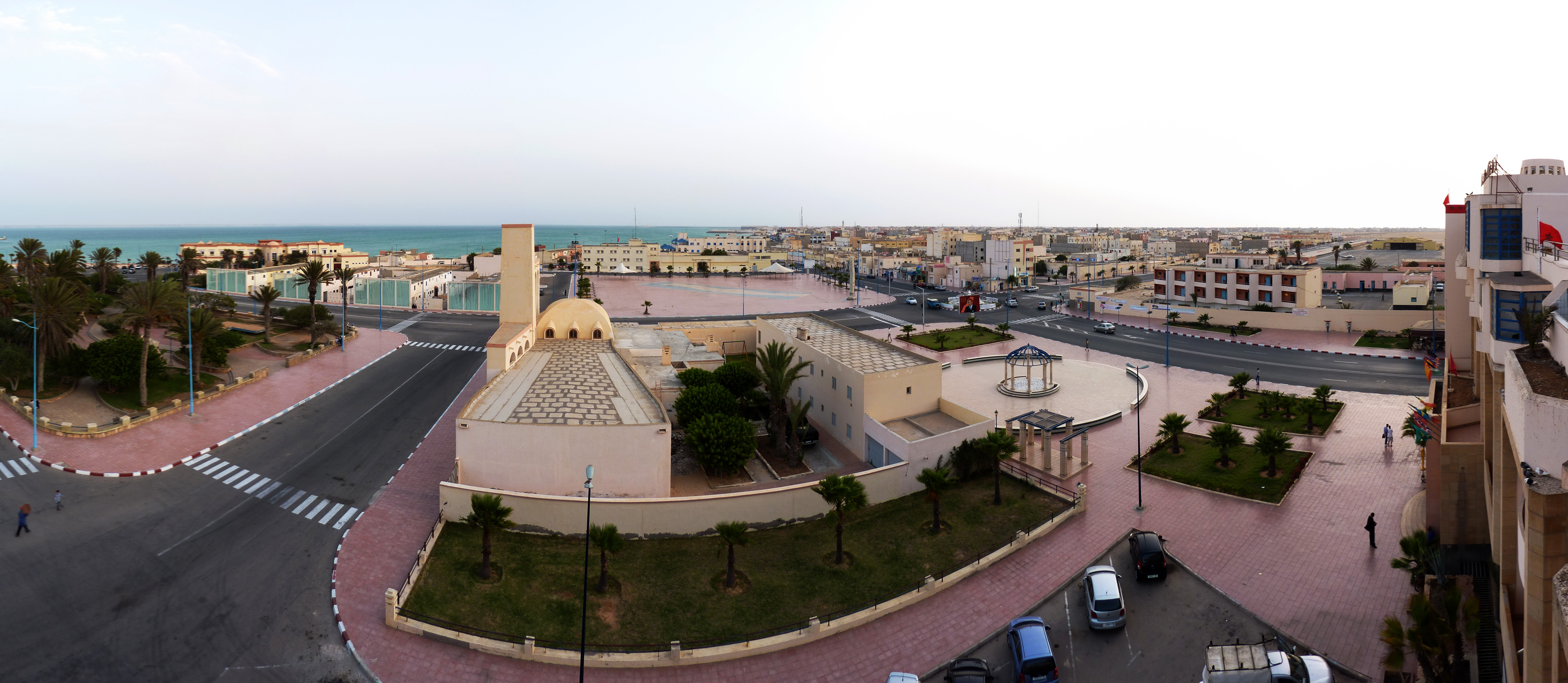

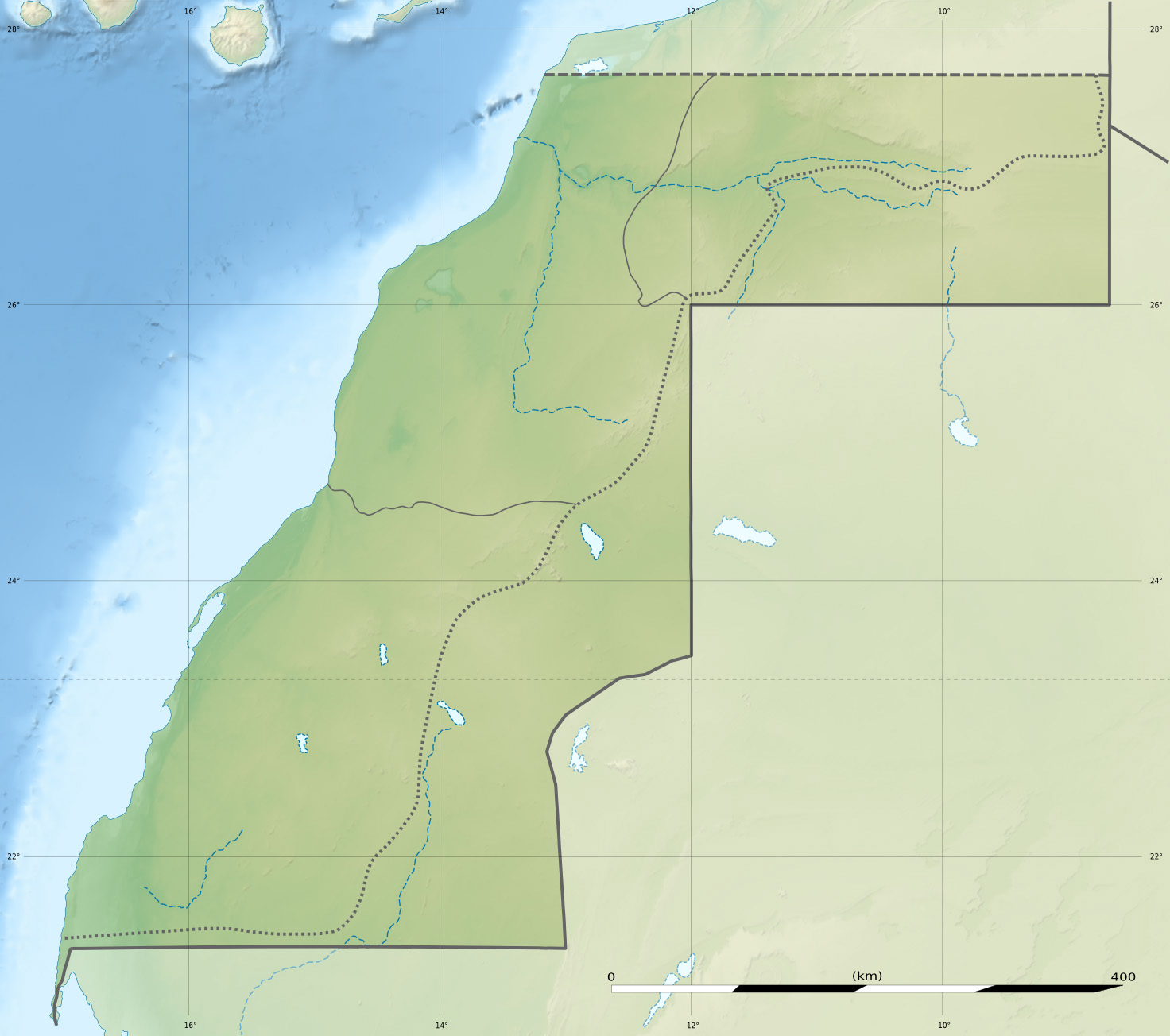
- Location in Western Sahara Dakhla (Africa)
- Coordinates: 23°43′N 15°57′W
- Non-self-governing territory: Western Sahara
- Claimed by: Morocco; Sahrawi Republic
- Controlled by: Morocco
- Region: Dakhla-Oued Ed-Dahab
- Province: Oued Ed-Dahab

Government
  - Mayor: Erragheb Hormatollah (RNI)

Area
  - Total: 301.45 km^{2} (116.39 sq mi)

Population (2024)
  - Total: 161,723
  - Density: 536.48/km^{2} (1,389.5/sq mi)
- Time zone: UTC+0 (GMT)
- Postal code: 73000

Dakhla (Arabic: الداخلة, lit. 'The Peninsula', Hassaniyya: [ˌəd.daːχlə]; founded as Villa Cisneros) is a city in the disputed territory of Western Sahara, and has been occupied by Morocco since 1979. It is the capital of the claimed Moroccan administrative region Dakhla-Oued Ed-Dahab. It has a population of 161,723 , making it the second-largest city in Western Sahara, after Laayoune. It is on a narrow peninsula of the Atlantic Coast, the Río de Oro Peninsula, about 550 km (340 mi) south of Laayoune.

== History ==
=== Early history ===
Rio de Oro was settled in the twelfth century by the Oulad Delim, an Arab Bedouin tribe of South Arabian descent that emigrated from Yemen. Dakhla was expanded by Spanish settlers during the expansion of their empire. The Spanish interest in the desert coast of Western Africa's Sahara arose as the result of fishing carried out from the nearby Canary Islands by Spanish fishers and as a result of the Barbary pirates menace.

Spanish fishers were seal fur hunters, traders, and whalers along the Saharan coast from Dakhla to Cabo Blanco from 1500 to the present, engaging in whaling for Humpback whales and their calves, mostly around Cape Verde, and the Gulf of Guinea in Annobón, São Tomé and Príncipe islands through 1940. These fishing activities had a negative impact on wildlife, causing the disappearance or endangering of many species, particularly marine mammals and birds.

=== Spanish colonization ===
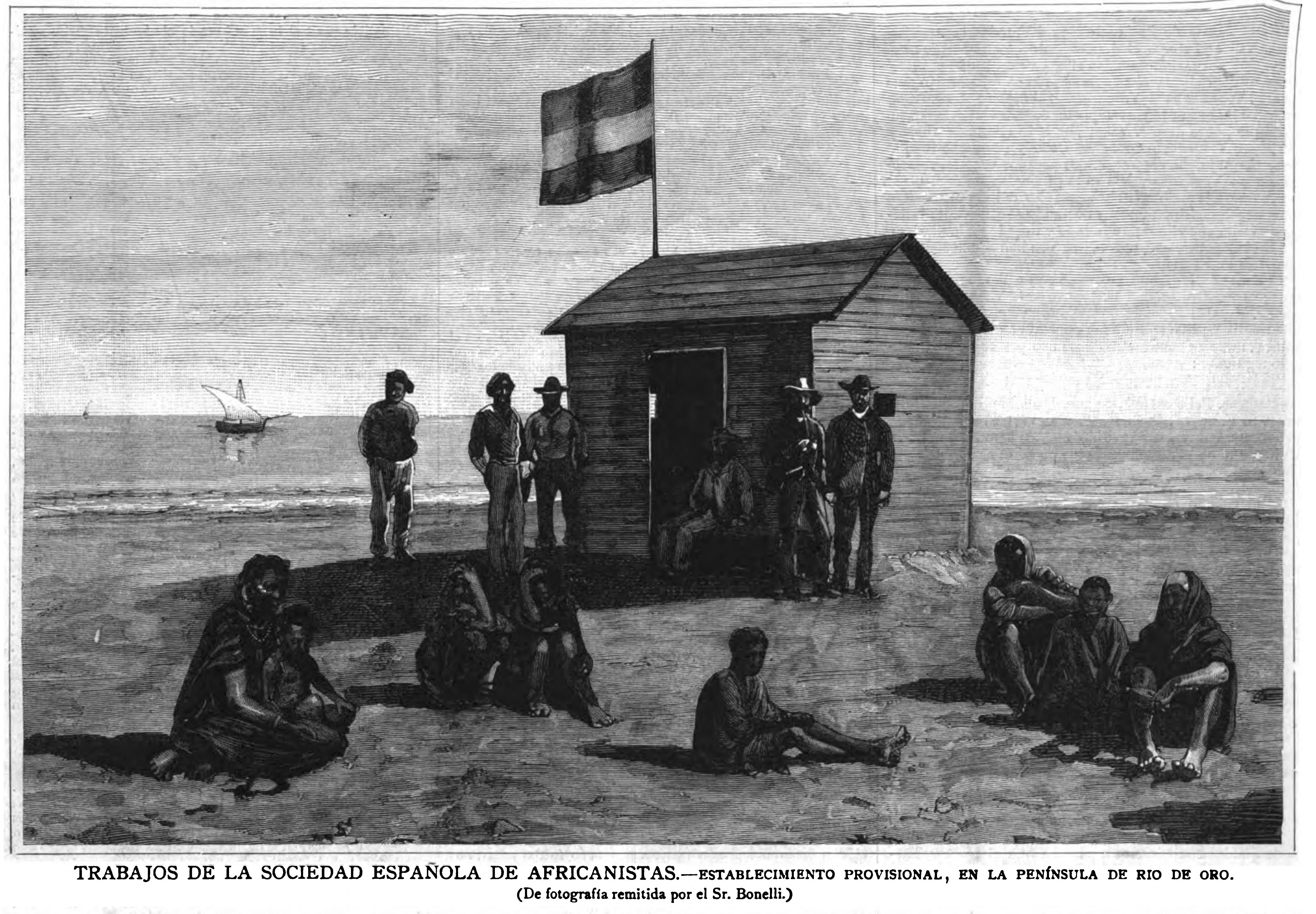
Early Spanish provisional settlement in the Río de Oro Peninsula during the exploratory works led by Emilio Bonelli (published in January 1885 in La Ilustración Española y Americana).

The Spaniards established whaling stations with some cod fishing and trading. In 1881, a dock was anchored off the coast of the Río de Oro Peninsula to support the work of the Canarian fishing fleet. However, it was not until 1884 that Spain formally founded the watering place as Villa Cisneros, in the settlement dated in 1502 by Papal bull. It was included in the enclaves conceded to the Spanish to the east of the Azores islands. Upon arriving in Rio de Oro in 1884 to establish their first coastal factories, the Spanish were forced to deal with the Oulad Delim, a Sahrawi Arab tribe that controlled the entirety of Rio de Oro and a strip of land in Mauritania extending from Nouadhibou to Idjlil. In 1884, the settlement of Villa Cisneros was promoted by the Spanish Society of Africanists and funded by the government of Canovas del Castillo. In the same year, the Oulad Delim attacked the trading post and looted its stores before the Spanish issued a royal decree that placed the coast from Cape Bojador to Cape Blanc under Spanish colonization. By 1886, Spanish colonial authority was extended 150 miles inland. The Spanish reached an agreement with a sheikh of the local Oulad Delim two years later.

The Spanish military, along with the Spanish Africanist Emilio Bonelli, claimed the coast between Cape Bojador and Cabo Blanco for Spain, founding three settlements on the Saharan coast: one in Villa Cisneros, named in honour of Francisco Cardinal Jiménez de Cisneros (1436–1517), the Spanish Humanist, Prime Minister, Regent and prelate who was the Grand Inquisitor during the Spanish Inquisition; and another in Cabo Blanco for seal hunting, which was given the name of Medina Gatell; and another in Angra de Cintra with the name of Puerto Badia, in honour of the Arabist and adventurer Domingo Badia. Bonelli got the native inhabitants of the peninsula de Río de Oro to sign an agreement that placed them under the "protection" of the Kingdom of Spain. Due to the presence of the three new settlements, in December 1884 the Spanish Government officially informed the main colonial powers assembled at the Berlin Conference that the Spanish Crown was in possession of the territory lying between Cape Bojador and Cape Blanco.

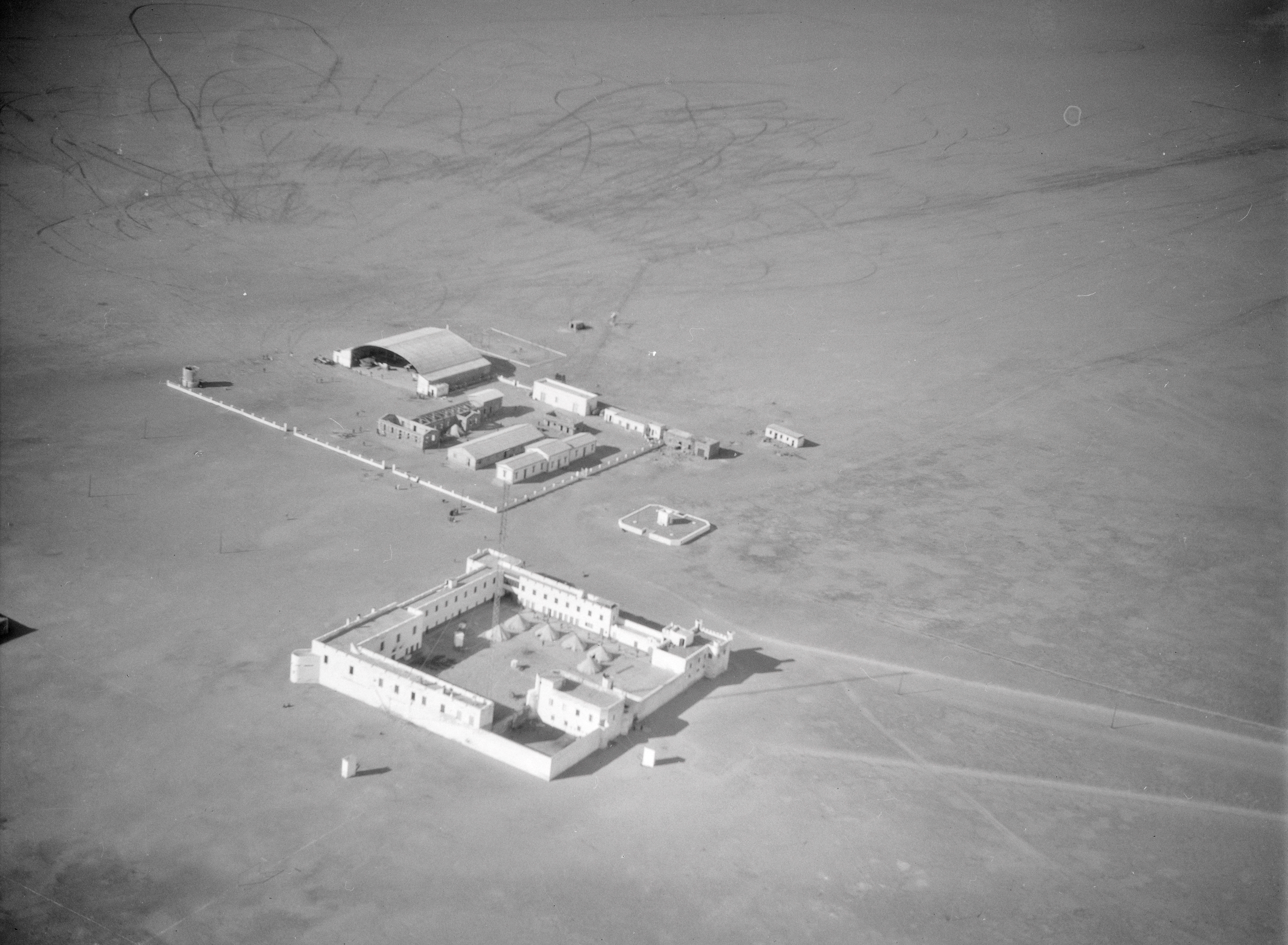
The fort at Villa Cisneros in 1930

During the colonial period, Spanish authorities made Dakhla, then known as Villa Cisneros, the capital of the province of Río de Oro, one of the two regions of what was known as Spanish Sahara. The authorities built a military fortress and it became an important way-station for the Toulouse-Dakar mail-plane during the 1920s. The Cisneros way-station features in Antoine de Saint-Exupery’s novel Courier Sud. The Spanish also built a modern Catholic church there. Following the Sanjurjada, 145 Spanish army officers were exiled to Villa Cisneros. A prison camp existed at the fort during the Spanish Civil War at which writers such as Pedro García Cabrera were imprisoned.

During the 1960s, the Francoist State also built Dakhla Airport, one of the three paved airports in Western Sahara.

It was from Villa Cisneros that on 12 January 1976, General Gómez de Salazar became the last Spanish soldier to depart what until that moment had been the colony of the Spanish Sahara; faced with Moroccan and Mauritanian pressure, Spanish authorities decided to give up the territory peacefully, instead of undertaking a fight that they believed they could win but would have cost many lives on all sides.

=== Mauritanian occupation ===
Following the signing of the Madrid Accords in 1975, Mauritania and Morocco invaded Western Sahara, with Mauritania taking over the southern half of the territory and establishing the province of Tiris al-Gharbiyya, with Dakhla as the provincial capital. The border was established just north of Dakhla, near the 24th parallel.

On 14 August 1979, Mauritania officially relinquished all its claims to Western Sahara after signing a peace agreement with the Polisario Front and withdrew all its forces from the territory.

=== Moroccan occupation ===
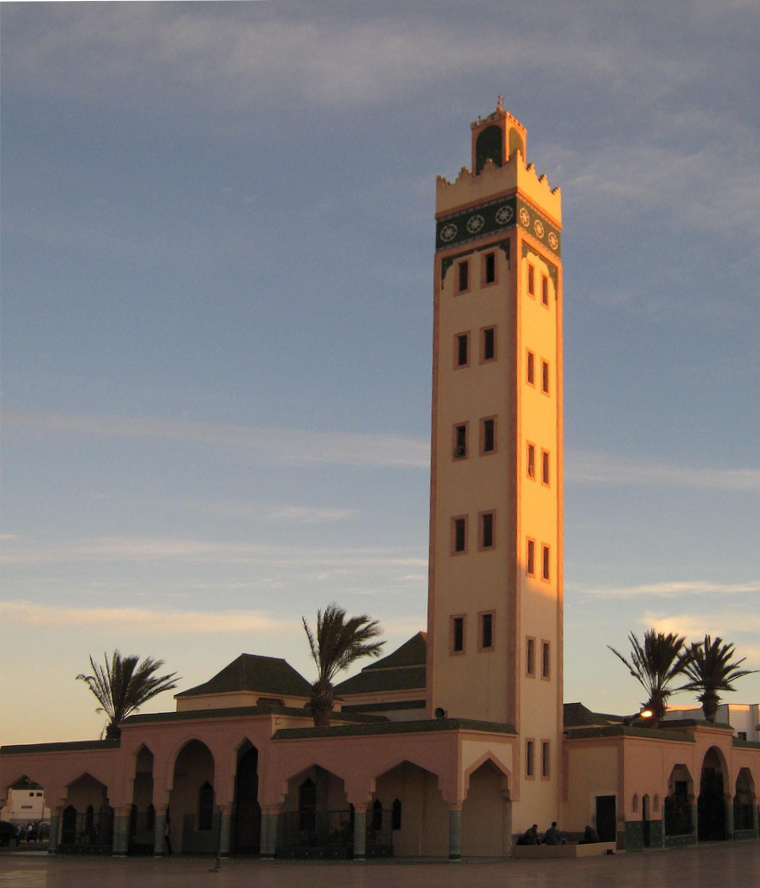
Mosque in Dakhla, 2009

On 11 August 1979, Morocco invaded Dakhla and three days later, the same day Mauritania officially withdrew from Western Sahara, illegally annexed the remaining territory.

There was a United Nations-sponsored ceasefire in 1991, but as recently as 2006, most UN member states have refused to recognise Moroccan sovereignty in the area.

In 2020, The Gambia, Guinea, Djibouti, Liberia, Burkina Faso, Equatorial Guinea, Guinea-Bissau, and the Democratic Republic of the Congo opened consulates in Dakhla.

As of 2024, the government of Morocco was in the process of building a $1.2-billion port in Dakhla as part of its "national port strategy". Construction was expected to be completed in 2028. Dakhla is also a key node for the African Atlantic Gas Pipeline championed by Morocco and Nigeria.

== Economy ==
=== Tourism and sport ===
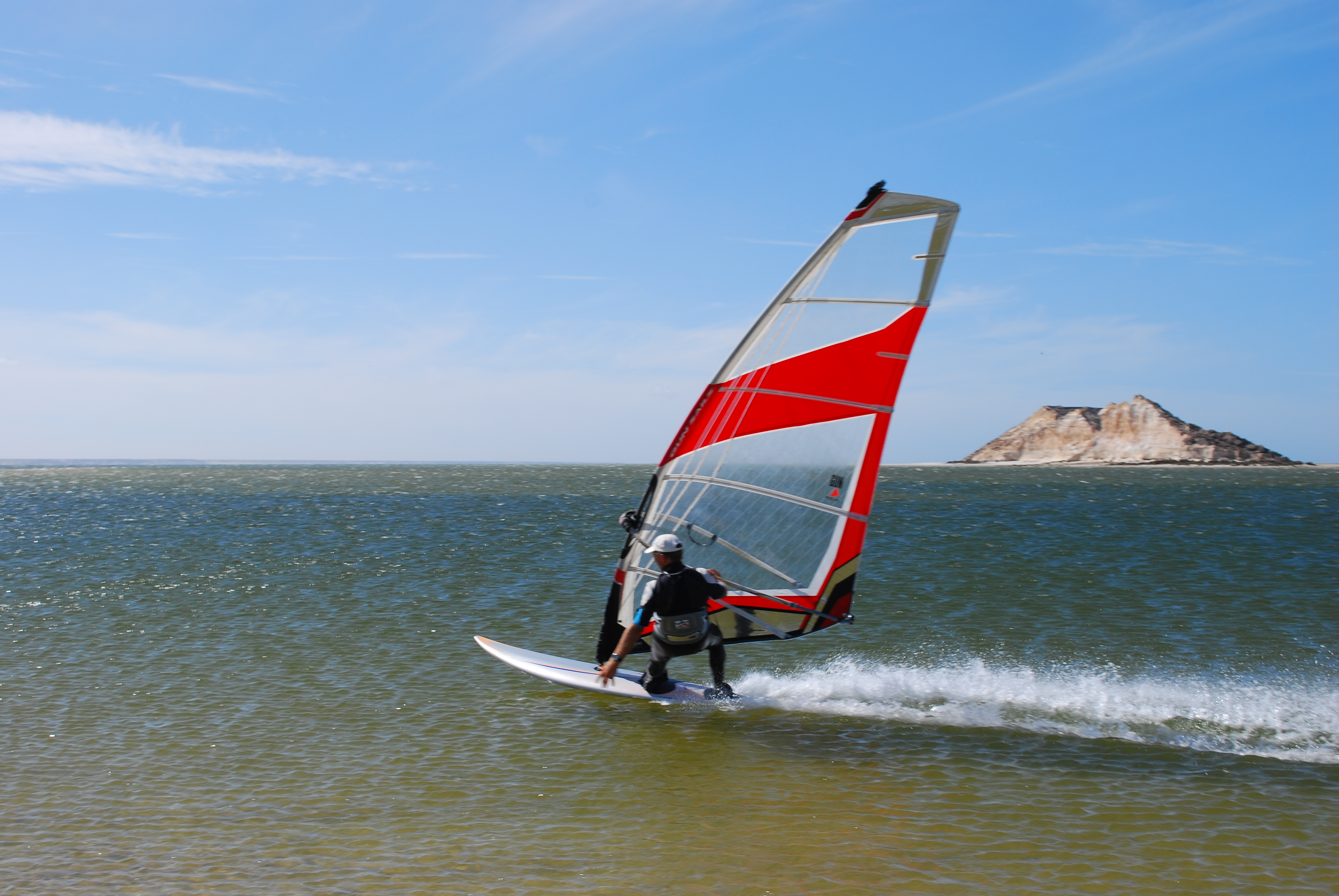
Windsurfer and the Dragon Island in the background

Dakhla's main economic activity is fishing and tourism. In recent years the town has become a centre for aquatic sports, such as kitesurfing, windsurfing and surf casting, and is known as a centre for water sports. The natural hot spring of Asmaa, located 36 km from the city of Dakhla, is also a very popular spot for tourists who come for its 38 °C thermal waters, sourced from a well about 700 meters deep.

Golfo de Cintra and the Mauritanian Banc d'Arguin National Park are located in the south.

=== Oil and gas ===
A United States firm Kosmos Energy and its United Kingdom counterpart Cairn Energy began searching for offshore oil in Western Sahara in early 2015. The African Atlantic Gas Pipeline is intended to come ashore near Dakhla, with an intake terminal planned south of the city.

=== Oyster industry ===
Oyster farming by hand is a traditional practice in Dakhla. Oysters are first sold to people and businesses in Dakhla, then to restaurants in cities like Marrakesh or Casablanca, and then any left are sold to Europe. In April 2015, Vice Media reported that oysters had recently begun to be exported to high-end European restaurants.

== Transportation ==
Dakhla Airport is used as a civilian airport and by Royal Air Maroc. The 3000 m runway can accommodate a Boeing 737 or smaller aircraft. The passenger terminal covers 670 m^{2} and is capable of handling up to 55,000 passengers per year.

== Climate ==
Dakhla has a mild desert climate (BWh) according to the Köppen climate classification. Dakhla receives an average 30.8 mm (1.21 in) of precipitation per year. The temperature averages around 18.4 °C (65.1 °F) during January, Dakhla's coldest month and around 23.2 °C (73.8 °F) during September, its warmest month. The temperature seems to be moderated by the Canary Current.

Climate data for Dakhla (1991-2020, extremes 1991-present)
Month	Jan	Feb	Mar	Apr	May	Jun	Jul	Aug	Sep	Oct	Nov	Dec	Year
Record high °C (°F)	33.3 (91.9)	34.6 (94.3)	38.5 (101.3)	37.1 (98.8)	41.0 (105.8)	35.6 (96.1)	35.2 (95.4)	39.1 (102.4)	39.5 (103.1)	40.8 (105.4)	36.8 (98.2)	33.3 (91.9)	41.0 (105.8)
Mean daily maximum °C (°F)	22.4 (72.3)	22.3 (72.1)	22.8 (73.0)	22.6 (72.7)	23.3 (73.9)	24.4 (75.9)	24.9 (76.8)	25.9 (78.6)	26.5 (79.7)	26.3 (79.3)	24.9 (76.8)	23.2 (73.8)	24.1 (75.4)
Daily mean °C (°F)	18.4 (65.1)	18.6 (65.5)	19.2 (66.6)	19.4 (66.9)	20.1 (68.2)	21.2 (70.2)	21.9 (71.4)	22.8 (73.0)	23.2 (73.8)	22.8 (73.0)	21.3 (70.3)	19.4 (66.9)	20.7 (69.3)
Mean daily minimum °C (°F)	14.3 (57.7)	14.8 (58.6)	15.6 (60.1)	16.2 (61.2)	16.9 (62.4)	18.0 (64.4)	18.9 (66.0)	19.7 (67.5)	19.9 (67.8)	19.3 (66.7)	17.6 (63.7)	15.5 (59.9)	17.2 (63.0)
Record low °C (°F)	10.0 (50.0)	10.4 (50.7)	12.0 (53.6)	11.6 (52.9)	13.1 (55.6)	15.6 (60.1)	16.5 (61.7)	17.3 (63.1)	17.3 (63.1)	13.7 (56.7)	13.1 (55.6)	11.1 (52.0)	10.0 (50.0)
Average precipitation mm (inches)	2.6 (0.10)	1.5 (0.06)	2.4 (0.09)	1.2 (0.05)	0.9 (0.04)	0.6 (0.02)	0.0 (0.0)	1.9 (0.07)	7.6 (0.30)	5.0 (0.20)	1.0 (0.04)	6.1 (0.24)	30.8 (1.21)
Average precipitation days (≥ 1.0 mm)	0.7	0.5	0.4	0.2	0.2	0.2	0.0	0.5	1.0	0.6	0.2	0.8	5.3
Average relative humidity (%)	70	77	75	75	78	79	81	82	80	77	76	73	77
Mean monthly sunshine hours	254.2	245.8	275.9	276.0	306.9	291.0	266.6	272.8	249.0	254.2	240.0	241.8	3,174.2
Mean daily sunshine hours	8.2	8.7	8.9	9.2	9.9	9.7	8.6	8.8	8.3	8.2	8.0	7.8	8.7
Source 1: NOAA
Source 2: Deutscher Wetterdienst (humidity 1973-1993, sun 1944-1970)

== Nature and ecology ==
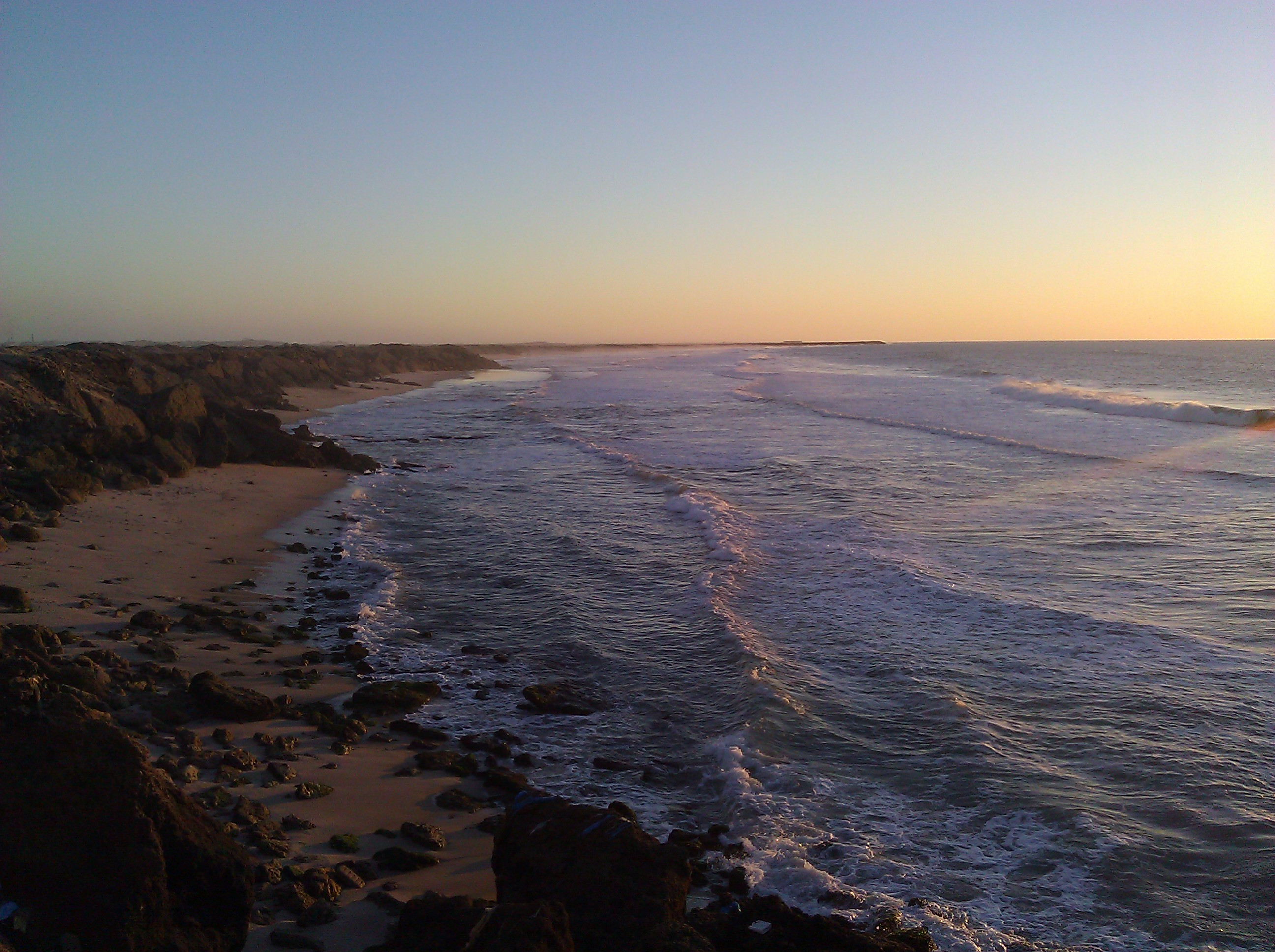
Rocky and sandy shores of Dakhla

Like most areas in Western Sahara, Dakhla and vicinity areas are very poor in vegetation and are mostly covered by the Sahara Desert. Unlike on land however, sea waters are or had been very rich in sea life due to the highly productive Current System of Canary flowing offshore and the renown Nouadhibou upwelling which is located nearby as well. These environmental factors provide excellent conditions for local fisheries, and result in strong local biodiversity for birds in particular. For these reasons, there has been a UNESCO proposal to create the "Dakhla National Park".

=== Birds ===
Dakhla Peninsula and Cintra Bay are some of the most important wintering grounds for birds especially for waders. The greater flamingo is one of the most iconic birds in the region and there are numerous others known to migrate or inhabit. Some of these are; pelican, great cormorant, gulls (slender-billed, Audouin's, black-backed), larks (sparrow, bar-tailed), terns (little, Caspian, royal, Sandwich), black wheatear, western reef heron, marsh harrier, sparrowhawk, lesser kestrel, laughing dove, great spotted cuckoo, little swift, hoopoe, rock martin, cricket longtail, oystercatcher, bar-tailed godwit, pharaoh eagle owl, and red-knobbed coot.

Northern bald ibis and common buttonquail are also rare on today's Western Sahara.

Several species such as golden nightjar, Sudan golden sparrow, hooded vulture, dark chanting goshawk, speckled pigeon, African mourning dove, blue-naped mousebird, Kordofan lark, red-chested swallow, chestnut-bellied starling, African swallow-tailed kite, tawny eagle, slender-billed curlew, demoiselle crane, Arabian bustard, ostrich, lappet-faced vulture, helmeted guineafowl are seemingly locally rare or extinct, or rather visitors or vagrants.

=== Mammals ===
Terrestrial animals are less diverse than birds, including Ruppell's fox, fennec fox, caracal, hyena, camel, gazelles, addaxes, hares, hedgehog variants, fat sand rat, lesser Egyptian jerboa, bats, and others. Barbary lion and hartebeest became extinct, and possibly local cheetah and North African elephant as well.

The calm, sheltered water of the Dakhla Bay was once an ideal habitat for various forms of marine life, including marine mammals. Most of the local animals such as Mediterranean monk seals and whales (mostly North Atlantic right whales) have disappeared due to histories of slaughter and exploitation like in Cintra Bay. Atlantic gray whales were likely to be seen along the coast before extinction.

On the other hand, monk seals are showing slow but certain recoveries and Ras Nouadhibou holds the world's most notable colony for this species. Nowadays, very small, remnant groups of bottlenose dolphins and Atlantic humpback dolphins are the only marine mammals still seen regularly in Dakhla Bay while there are occasional visits by some other species including orcas while cetaceans like minke, or sei, pilot whales, beaked whales, and dolphins are more common in offshore waters in today's Western Sahara.

=== Reptiles and others ===
Other than mammals, limited varieties of terrestrial reptiles, amphibians, arthropods are present here including lizards, smooth snake, Brongersma's toad, and yellow-tailed scorpion. Sea turtles are also present in the Dakhla region.

Larger fish like groupers, seabasses or croakers inhabit along the coasts. Dakhla and Cintra Bay areas are considered to be spawning grounds for local sardines.

== Twin towns – sister cities ==
Dakhla is twinned with:

- Crotone, Italy
- Vibo Valentia, Italy
- Great Neck, New York, United States
