= Nair (Mauritania) =

Small offshore island off the Banc d'Arguin National Park, Mauritania

Coordinates: 19.867°N 16.389°W

Nair is a small offshore island off the Banc d'Arguin National Park, Mauritania. It is an important breeding ground for spoonbills and slender-billed gulls. The island is part of the mud flats of the Banc d'Arguin and barely above sea level. As the oceans rise the island is disappearing and has already shrunk considerably from its historic size.

Neighbouring islets includes Arel to the northwest and the larger Niroumi to the east.
